= St. Mary's Catholic Church (Boise, Idaho) =

Historic church in Idaho, United States

- U.S. National Register of Historic Places
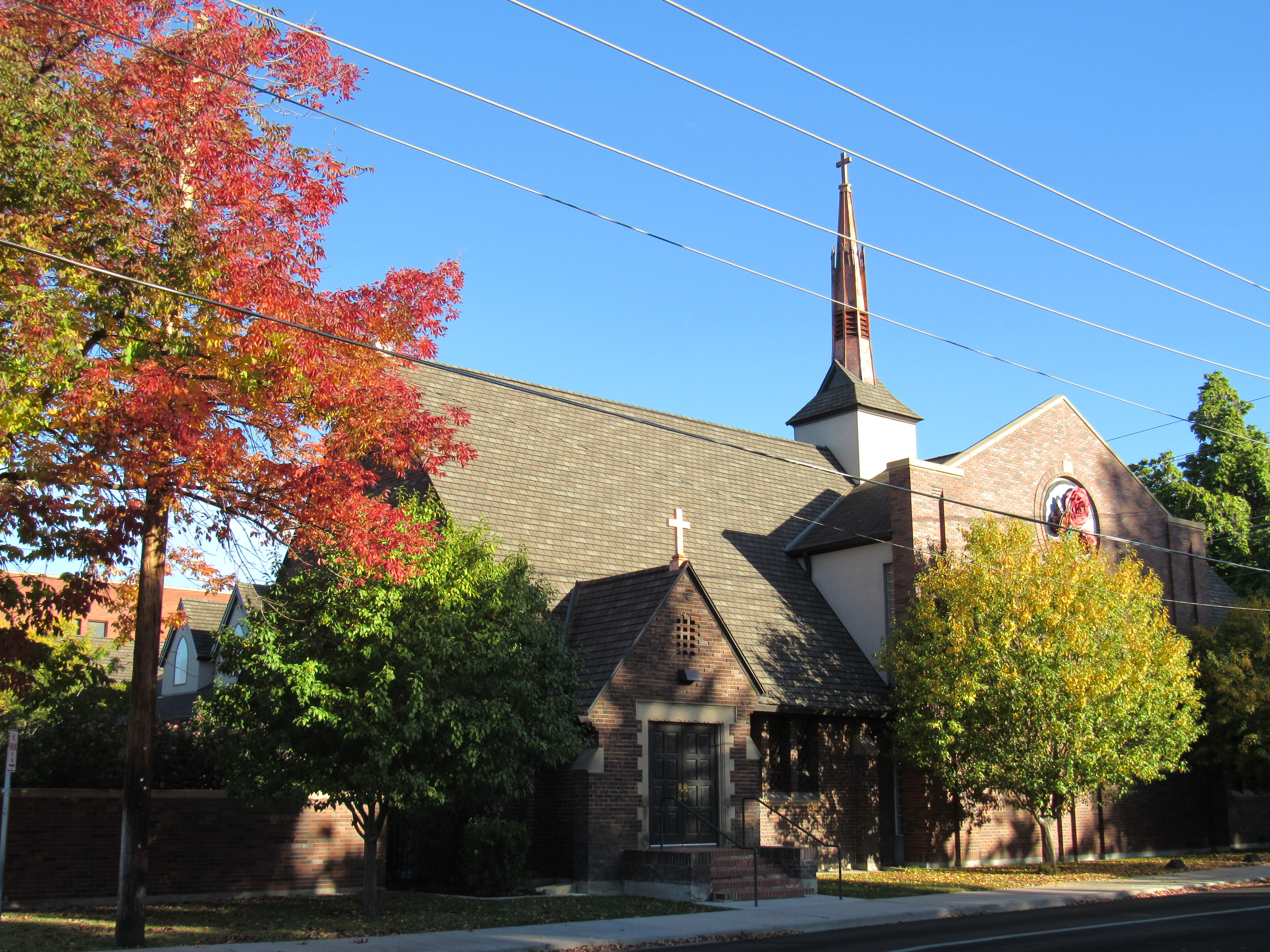

- Location within Idaho Location within the United States
- Location: State and 26th Sts., Boise, Idaho
- Coordinates: 43°37′54″N 116°13′15″W
- Area: less than one acre
- Built: 1937
- Architect: Tourtellotte & Hummel
- Architectural style: Classical Revival, Neo-Gothic Revival-Tudor
- MPS: Tourtellotte and Hummel Architecture TR
- NRHP reference No.: 82000246
- Added to NRHP: November 17, 1982

St. Mary's Catholic Church is a Catholic parish in Boise, Idaho, in the West Central Deanery of the Diocese of Boise.

It was erected by Bishop Edward Kelly in 1937 as Boise's second Catholic parish; the city's Catholic population had grown too large to be served solely by the Cathedral of St. John the Evangelist. Its North End location was criticized at the time for being too far from the city center. A Catholic school, St. Mary's School, was established in 1948.

The historic Gothic church building, located at State and 26th Streets, was designed bt Frank Hummel of Tourtellotte & Hummel. It was significantly enlarged in 2009 with a design by ZGA Architects and Planners intended to respect the original structure, which won the Idaho Historic Preservation Council's Orchid Award for cultural heritage preservation. The renovated building combines Gothic and neo-classical styles with some modern elements.

The church is richly decorated with religious artwork. Notable pieces include a statue of Mary seated in a pew, carved by John Taye; ten roof beams chainsaw-carved into statues of angels carrying various musical instruments by J. Chester Armstrong; large doors of Honduran mahogany also chainsaw-carved by Armstrong depicting Biblical scenes; and a Biblical altar triptych painted by Tom Browning. The church was listed on the National Register of Historic Places in 1982.
