= Gerald Francis O'Keefe =

American RC bishop (1918-2000)

His Excellency, The Most Reverend Gerald F. O'Keefe
- Bishop of Davenport
- Church: Catholic Church
- Appointed: October 20, 1966
- In office: January 4, 1967 – November 12, 1993
- Predecessor: Ralph Leo Hayes
- Successor: William Edwin Franklin
- Previous posts: Titular Bishop of Candyba; Auxiliary Bishop of St. Paul (1961 to 1966)

Orders
- Ordination: January 29, 1944 by John Gregory Murray
- Consecration: July 2, 1961 by William O. Brady

Personal details
- Born: March 30, 1918 Saint Paul, Minnesota, US
- Died: April 12, 2000 (aged 82) Davenport, Iowa, US
- Education: College of Saint Thomas; St. Paul Seminary
- Motto: Tibi totum restituo (I give it all back to you)

Gerald Francis O'Keefe (March 30, 1918 – April 12, 2000) was a 20th-century bishop of the Catholic Church in the United States. He served as auxiliary bishop for the Archdiocese of Saint Paul in Minnesota from 1961 to 1966 and bishop of the Diocese of Davenport in Iowa from 1966 to 1993.

== Biography ==
=== Early life ===
Gerald O’Keefe was born in Saint Paul, Minnesota, to Francis and Lucille (McDonald) O’Keefe. He had a younger sister, Mary, and grew up in suburban Wayzata, Minnesota. His father worked as a railroad signalman. O'Keefe was educated in the city's public schools. He graduated from the College of Saint Thomas and studied for the priesthood at St. Paul Seminary in St. Paul, Minnesota.

=== Priesthood ===
O’Keefe was ordained a priest in Saint Paul for the Archdiocese of St. Paul on January 29, 1944, by Archbishop John Gregory Murray. O'Keefe was assigned to the Cathedral of St. Paul Parish and served briefly as a teacher at St. Thomas Military Academy in St. Paul. He was later named vice chancellor and then chancellor of the diocese. He also served as chaplain to a convent of Benedictine nuns. On June 14, 1957, Pope Pius XII named O'Keefe a domestic prelate with the title of monsignor.

=== Auxiliary Bishop of Saint Paul ===
On May 5, 1961, Pope John XXIII appointed O'Keefe as titular bishop of Candyba and auxiliary bishop of St. Paul. He was consecrated by Archbishop William O. Brady on July 2, 1961, in the Cathedral of St. Paul. Bishops James Byrne and Hillary Hacker were the principal co-consecrators. He was named rector of the Cathedral of St. Paul and in 1962 vicar general of the archdiocese. During this period, O'Keefe attended all four sessions of the Second Vatican Council in Rome during the early 1960s.

=== Bishop of Davenport ===
On October 20, 1966, O'Keefe was appointed by Pope Paul VI as the sixth bishop of Davenport. He was installed on January 4, 1967, by Archbishop James J. Byrne of Dubuque at Sacred Heart Cathedral in Davenport. The installation represented the largest gathering to date of Catholic hierarchy in the cathedral's history: four archbishops, one abbot and 41 bishops. The attendees also included 24 Protestant clergy, 300 priests, 200 sisters and two lay people from every parish. For the first time in 22 years, women were allowed to sing in the cathedral choir at the cathedral, having been banned previously by Bishop Ralph Hayes.

=== Period of reform and renewal ===
In 1967, O'Keefe established Sister's Council in the diocese, representing the members of religious orders, along with a Lay Council. In 1970, he inaugurated the first diocesan pastoral council, which included clergy, religious orders, and the laity. A diocesan Board of Education was also established early in his episcopate. Procedures for due process, recommended by the Canon Law Society of America, were put in place in the late 1960s. In 1978, O'Keefe established the permanent diaconate, with the first class of deacons being ordained in 1980. He also organized a Deacons Council, similar to those for the priests, sisters and laity..

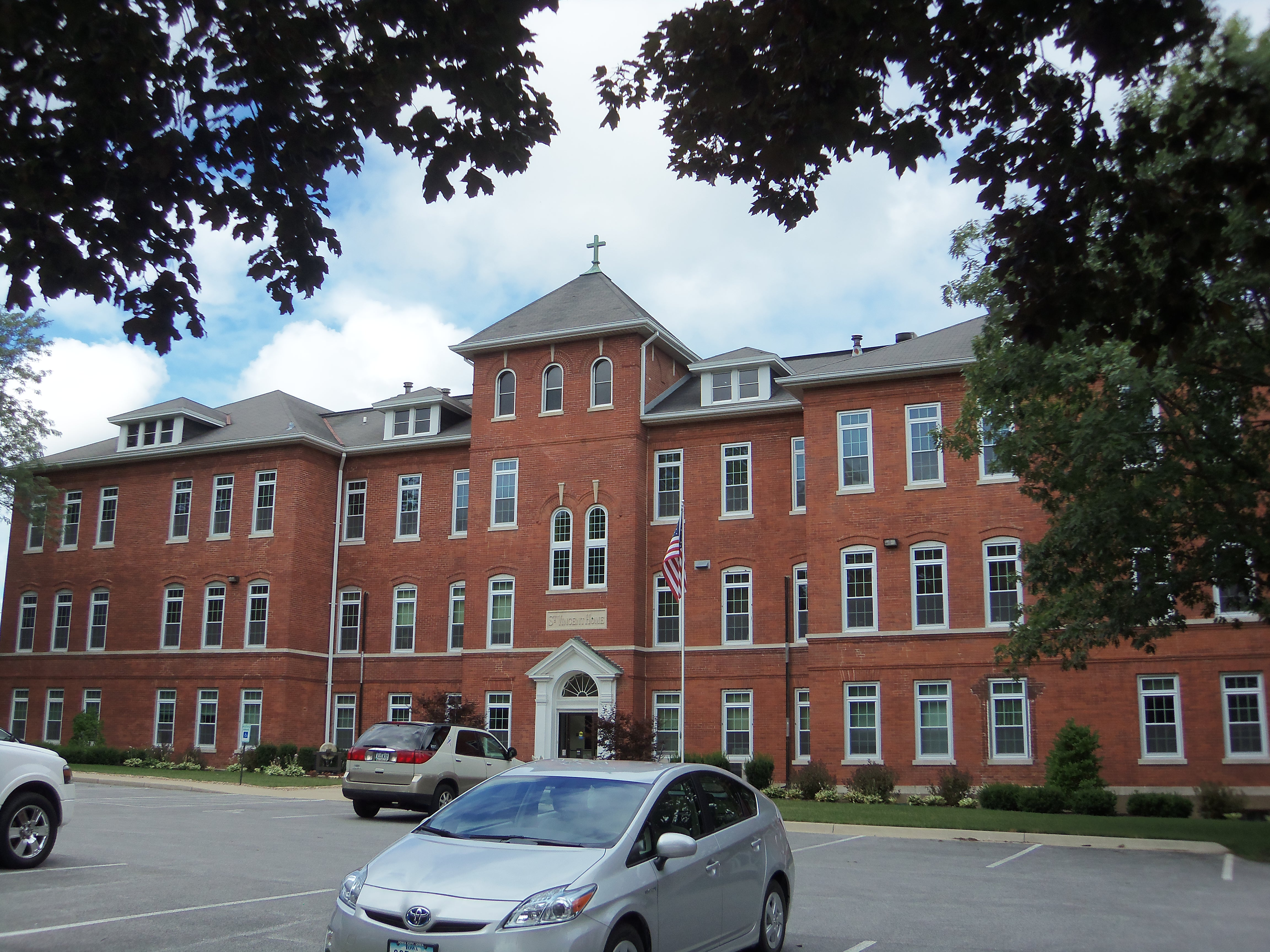
Diocesan Pastoral Center (former St. Vincent's Home), Davenport, Iowa (2013)

St. Vincent's Home, which had taken care of orphaned and abandoned children since 1897, closed in 1968. The following year Catholic Charities was replaced with the Office of Social Action under Reverend Marvin Mottet. In 1974, O’Keefe established the diocesan Pastoral Center and residence for both retired and active priests in the former St. Vincent's Home. Offices of Religious Education and Family Life were also established.

Ministry to Latinos became a priority in the diocese. As early as the post-World War I era, they had started moving into the diocese in noticeable numbers. Their numbers ebbed during the Great Depression of the 1930s and World War II in the 1940s. In the 1950s, migrant workers entered the diocese to work the farm fields around Muscatine and their numbers started to increase slowly. O’Keefe co-founded an office to assist migrant workers with job and education services. In 1972, the Social Action department established an Immigration Office. O'Keefe sent priests to Mexico to learn Spanish and immerse themselves in its culture. Three Spanish-speaking deacons were ordained in 1981.

During his tenure, O’Keefe called two diocesan synods. The 1974 synod, the first since 1932, included vowed religious and laity for the first time. It focused on spiritual renewal, unifying and restructuring the diocese. The 1985 synod focused on restructuring the diocese based on the recent reforms to the Code of Canon Law.

The diocese celebrated its centennial in 1981. Sister Madeleine Marie Schmidt wrote a diocesan history, and a liturgy was celebrated at Sacred Heart Cathedral. In attendance was Cardinal John Cody of Chicago.

=== Changing demographics ===
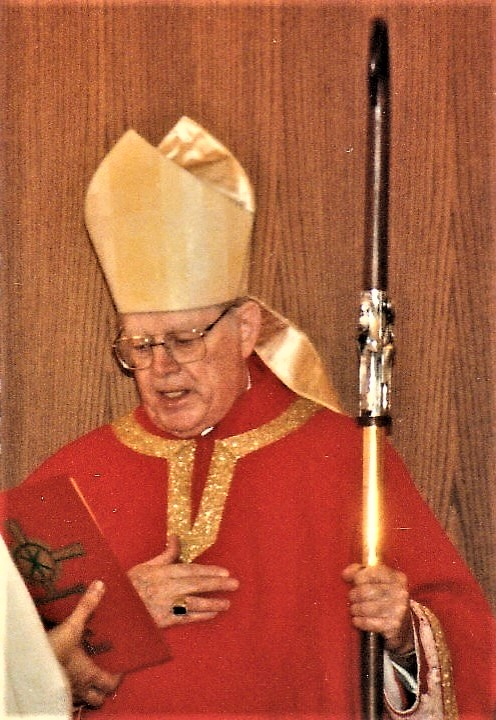
Bishop O'Keefe (1992)

Throughout his years as the bishop of the diocese, O'Keefe saw a decline in the number of priests and religious serving the diocese. At the same time, he saw the numbers of lay people active in ministry increase. The population of the diocese, however, remained stable. The economic recession that hit rural America in the 1980s affected the diocesan population and resources. In 1991, O'Keefe announced a plan for clustering and closing smaller parishes, which reflected both the decline in the number of priests and the rural population in Iowa. The diocese also witnessed a decline in enrollment in Catholic schools, which led to the merger or closing of schools across Southeast Iowa. Catholic hospitals were also affected. In 1970, there were ten hospitals in the diocese; by the time O'Keefe left office, they had been reduced to three.

St. Ambrose and Marycrest Colleges discussed a merger in the early 1970s, but eventually decided against it. St. Ambrose became a university in 1987. Marycrest started to decline. In 1990 it began an affiliation with the Teikyo Yamanashi Education and Welfare Foundation of Japan as a way to stay open and viable. It was renamed Teikyo Marycrest University and later Marycrest International University.

Ottumwa Heights College, like Marycrest, was operated by the Congregation of the Humility of Mary. It merged with Indian Hills Community College in 1979. The Sisters of Humility, who had been headquartered in Ottumwa since the 1880s, built a new headquarters and convent on the property of St. Vincent Center in Davenport in 1983.

=== Later life and death ===
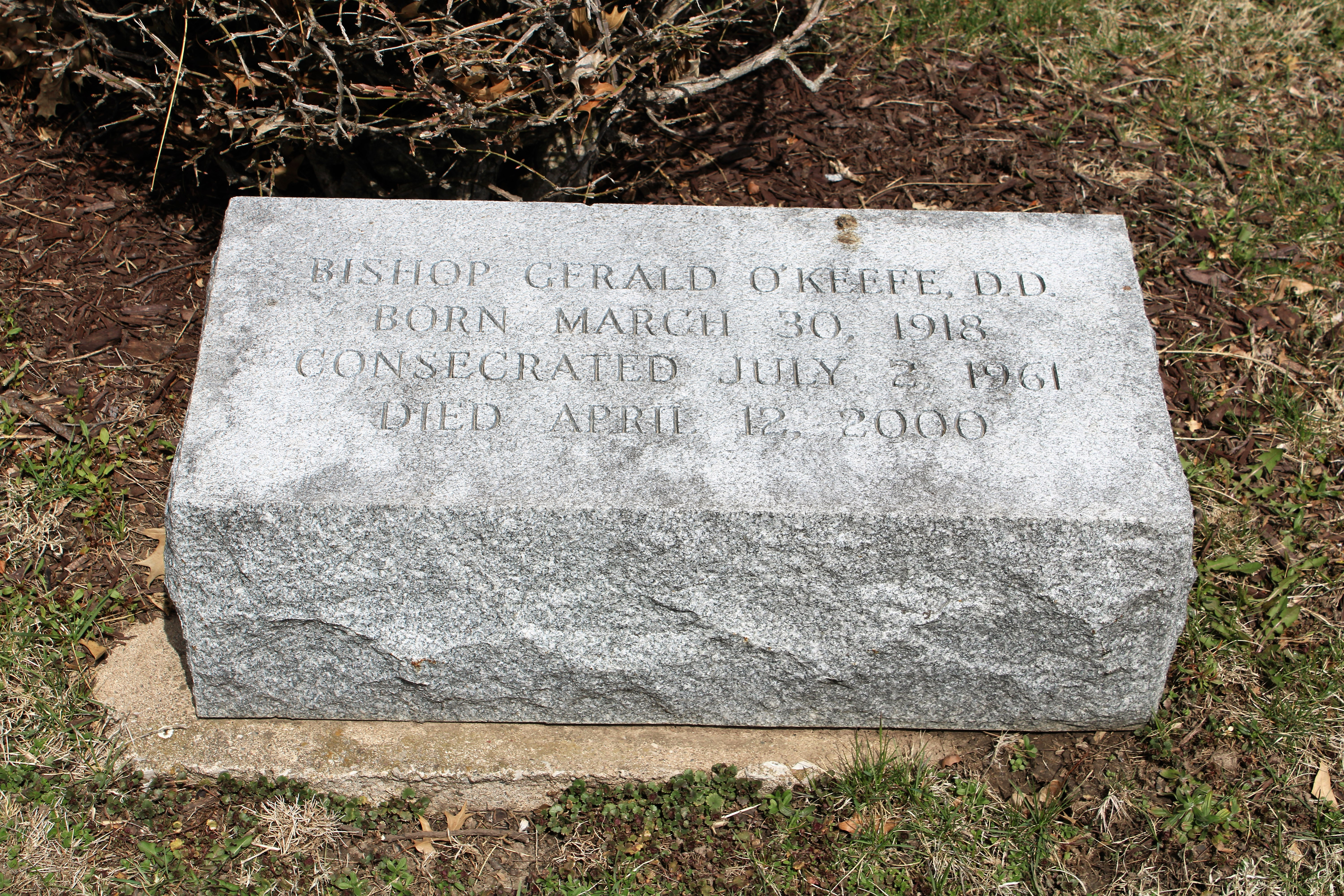
Bishop O'Keefe's grave, Mount Calvary Cemetery, Davenport, Iowa (2022)

In February 1992, O’Keefe was sued by two women in Minnesota for allegedly abusing them sexually them when he was rector of St. Paul Cathedral in the early 1960s. Both women were young girls at the time and credited recovering repressed memories for their accusations. O'Keefe denied the charges. A year later, he was cleared of any wrongdoing after it was determined the women suffered from mental illnesses and made up the stories while in therapy.

On November 12, 1993, Pope John Paul II accepted Bishop O’Keefe's resignation as bishop of Davenport. He retired to an apartment that was created for him on the grounds of St. Vincent Center. He died of a heart attack on April 12, 2000, after having celebrated the Chrism Mass . He was buried in the Bishop's Circle in Mt. Calvary Cemetery in Davenport.

The library at St. Ambrose University in Davenport was named in O'Keefe's honor. However, at the request of a victim of sexual abuse who was a 17 year old novice monk with the diocesan brothers group, the Franciscan Brothers of Christ the King. "O'Keefe acknowledged before his death that he was told of some instances of abuse and chose to relocate the accused priests, rather than report the abuse to authorities or take action to have the priests defrocked." When bishops were making decisions about abusers during O'Keefe's lifetime, abuse was described by some psychiatrists as a curable disease. However, the Board of Directors stated this was not an excuse to do what was morally acceptable and removed the name from the library. This request was approved by the president of St. Ambrose University and the bishop of Davenport in 2007.
