= St. Michael's Catholic Church (Holbrook, Iowa) =

- St. Michael’s Church, Cemetery, Rectory, and Ancient Order of Hibernians Hall
- U.S. National Register of Historic Places
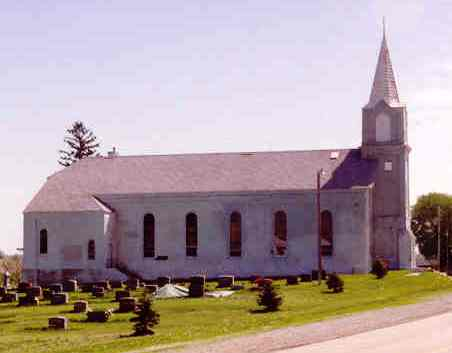

- Location within Iowa Location within the United States
- Location: On County Road F 52, East of Parnell, Iowa
- Coordinates: 41°35′24″N 91°54′49.9″W
- Area: less than one acre
- Built: 1867 (church); 1885 (rectory); 1899 (hall)
- Architectural style: Romanesque
- NRHP reference No.: 83000371
- Added to NRHP: January 20, 1983

St. Michael's Catholic Church is a former parish of the Diocese of Davenport. The church is located in the unincorporated village of Holbrook, east of Parnell, Iowa, United States. It is listed on the National Register of Historic Places as St. Michael's Church, Cemetery, Rectory, and Ancient Order of Hibernians Hall in 1983.

== Holbrook ==
The parish buildings represent the Irish-Catholic settlement of Holbrook. The area of Iowa County, Iowa that became known as Holbrook was settled by Irish immigrants or descendants of Irish immigrants. Thomas Hanson, one of those settlers, brought the priest from Iowa City in his lumber wagon and Mass was celebrated in his home. People from the surrounding area would gather for the Mass. The former rectory sits across the highway from the church and the former Hibernian Hall is across the cemetery to the west. The cemetery surrounds the church on three sides. Other than a few houses, they are all that is left of the village which at one time had a post office and a store.

== St. Michael's Parish ==
The parish was established in 1843 and plans to erect a church were begun. A small frame church was built in what is now St. Michael's Cemetery, near the site of the present church building. The Rev. Mathias Hannon, who came to Holbrook from St. Mary's in Iowa City for the first time in 1853, described the church thus, "I said mass within before the floor was laid, had the beautiful snow for carpet, and a pine box for an altar in fact a place as forlorn as the stable wherein the Savior was born. There was no more than fourteen families."

Bishop Mathias Loras of the Diocese of Dubuque assigned the Rev. Peter J. Sullivan as the first resident pastor. He built the current church building in the Romanesque Revival style in 1867. The building is constructed of brick, measures 90 by 50 feet (27 by 15 m), and cost about $2,000 to build. The pastor himself donated the paintings for the Stations of the Cross, which cost $1,000. They are no longer in the church and what happened to them is unknown.

St. Michael's became a parish of the Davenport Diocese when it was established in 1881. Alterations were made to the buildings as the years continued. The bell, which is still in the tower, was cast in St. Louis in 1882. A new dome was placed on top of the bell tower during the pastorate of the Rev. Thomas King (1889–1909). During the pastorate of the Rev. Edward Gaule (1909–1917) a new sanctuary with new altars was added to the church. The new bell tower, the third one constructed on this site, was added at this time as well. An addition was added onto the rectory when the Rev. John J. Moriarity (1917–1922) was the pastor. The Rev. James M. Ryan (1922–1927) added stucco to the exterior of the church during his pastorate.

In 1885 Bishop Henry Cosgrove assigned the Rev. James Davis as the pastor. He was an Irish immigrant who came to the Dubuque Diocese shortly after his ordination in 1878. At the time, St. Joseph's in Parnell was a mission to St. Michael's, and Davis built both the school and church there. He also built the front part of the present rectory in Holbrook. Four years later he was transferred to St. Margaret's Cathedral in Davenport. He would be the cathedral's rector and direct the construction of the new Sacred Heart Cathedral. The people of Holbrook considered the transfer a demotion seeing as St. Margaret's was a smaller parish. Father Davis went on to become coadjutor bishop in 1904 and then Bishop of Davenport in 1906.

As the 20th century progressed the rural population of Iowa decreased, and the Holbrook area was no different. Toward the end of the century St. Michael's was clustered with other parishes in the area and served by a single priest. Finally, on March 28, 1996, Bishop William Franklin announced in The Catholic Messenger that St. Michael's would close by the end of June. In a little over a century St. Michael's went from being “the largest and best parish in the diocese” to closing. Rev. Richard Okumu of St. Peter's parish in Cosgrove was placed in charge of pastoral management for corporate affairs. The parish buildings were sold to the Friends of St. Michael's, who are now responsible for their upkeep.

== Ancient Order of Hibernians Hall ==
The Hibernian Hall was built in 1899 by the local chapter of the Ancient Order of Hibernians. It was deeded to the parish corporation in 1948 and was renamed St. Michael's Parish Hall. It is a 1½-story frame structure that sits to the west of the church. The building is covered in clapboard and it is capped with a gableed roof. The round-arch windows that mimic those of the church are surrounded by drip molds. There is an odd-placed rectangular window above and to one side of the entrance. It appears in an early photo of the structure, but it may not be original.
