= Parnell, Iowa =

- City
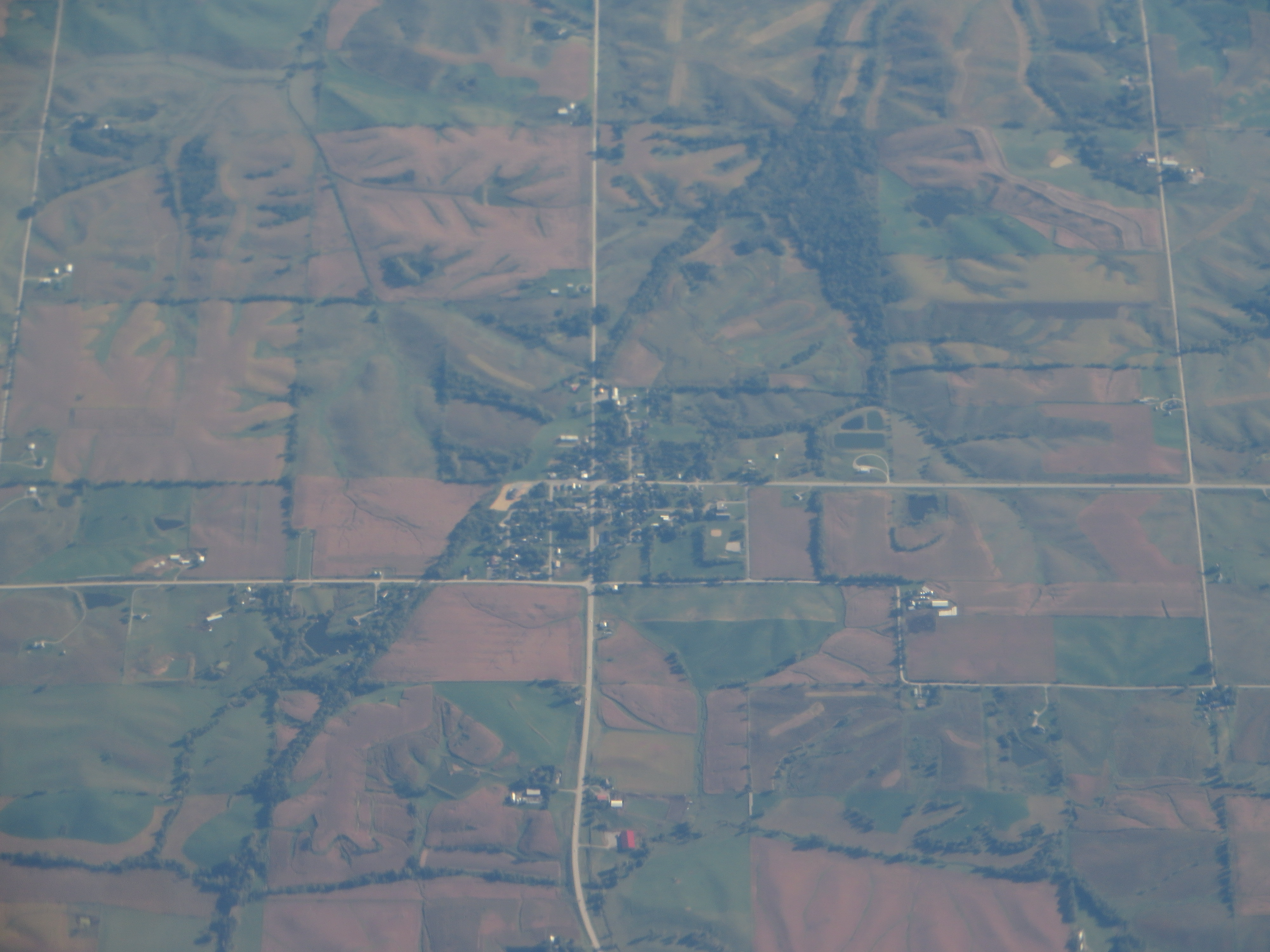
- Aerial view of Parnell

- Location of Parnell, Iowa
- Coordinates: 41°35′05″N 92°00′08″W
- Country: United States
- State: Iowa
- County: Iowa

Area
  - Total: 0.18 sq mi (0.46 km^{2})
  - Land: 0.18 sq mi (0.46 km^{2})
  - Water: 0 sq mi (0.00 km^{2})
- Elevation: 863 ft (263 m)

Population (2020)
  - Total: 194
  - Density: 1,093.1/sq mi (422.06/km^{2})
- Time zone: UTC-6 (Central (CST))
  - Summer (DST): UTC-5 (CDT)
- ZIP code: 52325
- Area code: 319
- FIPS code: 19-61770
- GNIS feature ID: 2396156

Parnell is a city in Iowa County, Iowa, United States. The population was 194 at the time of the 2020 census.

== History ==
Parnell, in Fillmore Township, Iowa County, Iowa, was named after Charles Stewart Parnell, a noble Irish statesman who had come to the American people to plead the cause of Ireland's land-impoverished peasants.

The Milwaukee Railroad helped to create Parnell. In 1884, the people of the little Irish town of Lytle City moved residences, stores, buildings, and families three miles west to where the railroad was beginning.

The people of Lytle City, who were mostly members of the Catholic Church, then became residents of Parnell. The town was incorporated on March 24, 1891, with a population of 156.

The early businesses consisted of a hardware store, grocery store, a drug store, a foundry and blacksmith, a newspaper office, hotel, a livery stable, tavern, dry goods store, millinery shop, a photographer, opera house, and a bank.

Catholic church services began in the fall of 1888. St. Joseph's Catholic Church was erected the next year. The Rev. James Davis was its first pastor. This was the largest Catholic Church in the county; and the only church in Parnell until March 16, 1958, when the Parnell Mennonite Church became an organized congregation. The St. Joseph's Cemetery was established in 1892 east of town. Due to deteriorating conditions, the church was torn down on April 27, 2010.

The Parnell school district was first known as Locust Grove Independent district. The school house was one mile east of town for the first two years. In order to accommodate the pupils in town and in the western part of the district, school was held in a store building in Parnell in the winter of 1888–1889. Birdie Costello and W.J. Naughton were the first teachers. In 1889, a new one-room building was erected; and later in 1899, a four-room brick structure was built. The school became a high school in 1899. In 1907, it adopted the eleventh grade course; and in 1915, it was raised to twelfth grade. In 1916, the Parnell Consolidated School was open-ed, becoming Parnell's first public school. The Sisters of Humility were transferred to this school, which until 1955, was one of the few public schools in the state to hire Roman Catholic nuns as instructors.

Early families of Parnell included the Shuells, Murphys, Hannons, Tiernans, Kellys, McDonalds, Dwyers, Callans, Eagletons, Lawlers, Tourneys, McCunes, Mullinex', Naughtons, Quinns, Sheridans, Mastersons, Ryans, Leahys, Murrins, Coakleys, Carneys, Sullivans and Weldons.

In 1985, businesses included Weldon's DX, Shamrock Cafe, Royal Beauty Salon, Parnell Sandwich & Cone Shoppe, Parnell Tavern, Parnell Post Office, Central Midwest Petroleum, Parnell Cycle Shop, and Johnny O's Car Wash.

The St. Michael's Church, Cemetery, Rectory and Ancient Order of Hibernians Hall, located four miles to the east in the hamlet of Holbrook was listed on the U.S. National Register of Historic Places in 1983.

== Geography ==
According to the United States Census Bureau, the city has a total area of 0.17 square miles (0.44 km^{2}), all land.

== Demographics ==
Historical populations
Year	Pop.	±%
1900	318	—
1910	369	+16.0%
1920	325	−11.9%
1930	262	−19.4%
1940	263	+0.4%
1950	206	−21.7%
1960	200	−2.9%
1970	175	−12.5%
1980	234	+33.7%
1990	209	−10.7%
2000	220	+5.3%
2010	193	−12.3%
2020	194	+0.5%
Source:"U.S. Census website". United States Census Bureau. and Iowa Data Center; Source: U.S. Decennial Census

=== 2020 census ===
As of the census of 2020, there were 194 people, 81 households, and 48 families residing in the city. The population density was 1,093.1 inhabitants per square mile (422.1/km^{2}). There were 93 housing units at an average density of 524.0 per square mile (202.3/km^{2}). The racial makeup of the city was 89.7% White, 2.6% Black or African American, 0.5% Native American, 0.0% Asian, 0.0% Pacific Islander, 2.1% from other races and 5.2% from two or more races. Hispanic or Latino persons of any race comprised 2.6% of the population.

Of the 81 households, 37.0% of which had children under the age of 18 living with them, 43.2% were married couples living together, 9.9% were cohabitating couples, 16.0% had a female householder with no spouse or partner present and 30.9% had a male householder with no spouse or partner present. 40.7% of all households were non-families. 33.3% of all households were made up of individuals, 6.2% had someone living alone who was 65 years old or older.

The median age in the city was 39.0 years. 25.3% of the residents were under the age of 20; 3.6% were between the ages of 20 and 24; 28.4% were from 25 and 44; 29.9% were from 45 and 64; and 12.9% were 65 years of age or older. The gender makeup of the city was 51.5% male and 48.5% female.

=== 2010 census ===
As of the census of 2010, there were 193 people, 87 households, and 43 families residing in the city. The population density was 1,135.3 inhabitants per square mile (438.3/km^{2}). There were 100 housing units at an average density of 588.2 per square mile (227.1/km^{2}). The racial makeup of the city was 97.4% White, 2.1% Native American, and 0.5% from two or more races. Hispanic or Latino of any race were 0.5% of the population.

There were 87 households, of which 26.4% had children under the age of 18 living with them, 40.2% were married couples living together, 6.9% had a female householder with no husband present, 2.3% had a male householder with no wife present, and 50.6% were non-families. 41.4% of all households were made up of individuals, and 11.5% had someone living alone who was 65 years of age or older. The average household size was 2.22 and the average family size was 3.14.

The median age in the city was 41.7 years. 25.4% of residents were under the age of 18; 8.3% were between the ages of 18 and 24; 23.3% were from 25 to 44; 34.2% were from 45 to 64; and 8.8% were 65 years of age or older. The gender makeup of the city was 51.8% male and 48.2% female.

=== 2000 census ===
As of the census of 2000, there were 220 people, 91 households, and 52 families residing in the city. The population density was 1,267.8 inhabitants per square mile (489.5/km^{2}). There were 103 housing units at an average density of 593.6 per square mile (229.2/km^{2}). The racial makeup of the city was 100.00% White. Hispanic or Latino of any race were 0.45% of the population.

There were 91 households, out of which 36.3% had children under the age of 18 living with them, 46.2% were married couples living together, 8.8% had a female householder with no husband present, and 41.8% were non-families. 34.1% of all households were made up of individuals, and 16.5% had someone living alone who was 65 years of age or older. The average household size was 2.42 and the average family size was 3.26.

In the city, the population was spread out, with 30.9% under the age of 18, 7.3% from 18 to 24, 27.7% from 25 to 44, 19.1% from 45 to 64, and 15.0% who were 65 years of age or older. The median age was 34 years. For every 100 females, there were 93.0 males. For every 100 females age 18 and over, there were 92.4 males.

The median income for a household in the city was $36,667, and the median income for a family was $47,500. Males had a median income of $27,059 versus $22,500 for females. The per capita income for the city was $19,293. About 3.8% of families and 6.2% of the population were below the poverty line, including 7.8% of those under the age of eighteen and 2.9% of those 65 or over.

== Notable people ==
- William Edwin Franklin, Roman Catholic bishop, was born in Parnell.
- Patsy Gharrity, baseball player
