= Louis Aloysius Lootens =

Belgian prelate

His Excellency, The Right Reverend Louis Aloysius Lootens
- Auxiliary Bishop of Vancouver Island
- Diocese: Diocese of Vancouver Island
- Appointed: February 27, 1876
- Term ended: January 10, 1898
- Other post: Vicar Apostolic of Idaho (1868–1876)

Orders
- Ordination: June 14, 1851 by Modeste Demers
- Consecration: August 9, 1868 by Joseph Sadoc Alemany

Personal details
- Born: March 17, 1827 Bruges, Southern Netherlands
- Died: January 12, 1898 (aged 70) Victoria, British Columbia, Canada

Louis Aloysius Lootens (March 17, 1827 – January 12, 1898) was a Belgian prelate of the Catholic Church. He served as an auxiliary bishop of the Diocese of Vancouver Island in British Columbia in Canada from 1876 to 1898. He previously served as the first vicar apostolic of Idaho and Western Montana in the United States from 1868 to 1876.

== Biography ==
=== Early life ===
Louis Lootens was born in Bruges in what was then the Southern Netherlands on March 17, 1827, the fourth of nine children of Charles and Catherine (née Beyaert) Lootens. His father was a carpenter and his mother was a lacemaker. After receiving his classical education in his native Belgium, he studied for the priesthood at the seminary at Saint-Nicolas-du-Chardonnet in Paris, France.

During his final year of studies, Bishop Modeste Demers was touring Europe to recruit priests for the Diocese of Vancouver Island and Lootens offered his services.

=== Priesthood ===
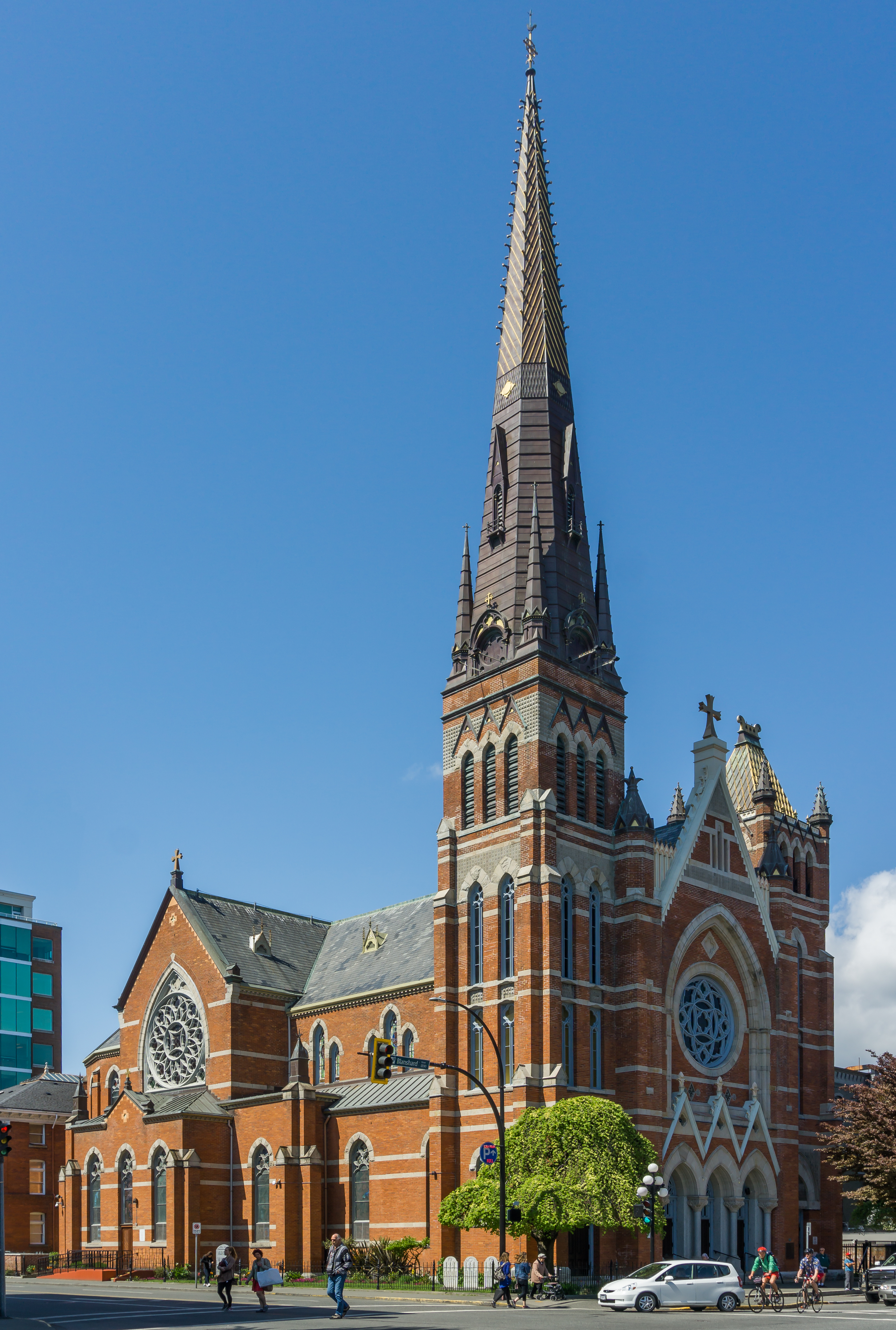
Saint Andrew's Cathedral, Victoria, British Columbia (2018)

Lootens was ordained a priest by Demers in Paris for the Diocese of Vancouver Island on June 14, 1851. The following year Lootens, Demers, and two other clerics arrived in Victoria in the Colony of British Columbia on August 29, 1852.

After five years of missionary work at mining camps and Native American villages in the Cariboo and Fraser Valley region, Lootens was accepted into the Archdiocese of San Francisco in June 1857. He was entrusted with an extensive area that included Mariposa, La Grange, and Hornitos in California. A year later, the archdiocese transferred him to Sonora, California, to serve as pastor of St. Patrick's Parish. He remained there until 1859, when he assumed charge of both St. Vincent's Parish at Petaluma, California, and St. Raphael's Parish in San Rafael, California.

In addition to his pastoral work, Lootens served as director of St. Vincent's School for Boys in San Rafael (1859–1868). During his administration of the school, he added schoolrooms, dormitories, an administration building, and a chapel to accommodate a growing student population. The city of San Rafael named a street Lootens Place in his honor.

=== Vicar Apostolic of Idaho ===
On March 3, 1868, Lootens was appointed the first vicar apostolic of the Vicariate Apostolic of Idaho and Montana and titular bishop of Castabala by Pope Pius IX. His jurisdiction covered the Territory of Montana, which then included the present-day State of Idaho and the western section of present-day Montana. Lootens received his episcopal consecration on August 9, 1968, from Archbishop Joseph Sadoc Alemany, with Bishops Thaddeus Amat y Brusi and Eugene O'Connell serving as co-consecrators, at Old St. Mary's Cathedral in San Francisco.

Lootens arrived in the Montana Territory in January 1869 and took up residence at Granite Creek in Idaho. At the end of that year, he left for Rome to participate in the First Vatican Council (1869–1870). The first Catholic church in Boise was dedicated in December 1870 but it burned down just a month later in January 1871.

In 1866, when the Second Plenary Council of Baltimore had proposed creating a vicariate, Idaho was in the midst of its first mining boom. However, by the 1870s, the placer mining industry was beginning to fail and large numbers of miners were leaving. During Lootens' tenure, the Catholic population of Idaho dropped from 15,000 to 1,000. In 1873, Lootens wrote to the Vatican:

"The Catholic population of the Vicariate Apostolic of Idaho having dwindled away to such an extent that the remainder does no longer afford us...the bare necessaries of life."

At this point, Lootens' health began to decline. He submitted his resignation as vicar apostolic to the Vatican; it was accepted on February 27, 1876. It would be more than eight years before a successor, fellow Belgian Alphonse Joseph Glorieux, was appointed as vicar apostolic there.

=== Auxiliary Bishop of Vancouver ===
Lootens returned to British Columbia, where he began his priestly ministry, and was named an auxiliary bishop of the Diocese of Vancouver Island. As the oldest cleric in the diocese, he laid the cornerstone of the new St. Andrew's Cathedral at Victoria in 1890. In 1895 he published a book on the Gregorian chant.

Lootens died in Victoria on January 12, 1898, at age 70.

== See also ==
- Historical list of the Catholic bishops of the United States

Catholic Church titles
Preceded by –	Auxiliary Bishop of Vancouver Island; 1876–1898	Succeeded by –
Preceded by none	Vicar Apostolic of Idaho; 1868–1876	Succeeded by Alphonse Joseph Glorieux
