= Daniel Mary Gorman =

American prelate (1861–1927)

His Excellency, The Right Reverend Daniel Mary Gorman
- Bishop of Boise
- See: Diocese of Boise
- Appointed: February 6, 1918
- Installed: May 1, 1918
- Term ended: June 9, 1927
- Predecessor: Alphonse Joseph Glorieux
- Successor: Edward Kelly

Orders
- Ordination: June 24, 1893 by John Joseph Frederick Otto Zardetti
- Consecration: May 1, 1919 by Giovanni Bonzano

Personal details
- Born: April 12, 1861 Wyoming, Iowa, US
- Died: June 9, 1927 (aged 66) Lewiston, Idaho, US
- Denomination: Roman Catholic
- Education: St. Joseph's College; St. Francis Seminary

Daniel Mary Gorman (April 12, 1861 – June 9, 1927) was an American prelate of the Roman Catholic Church. He served as bishop of the Diocese of Boise in Idaho from 1918 until his death in 1927.

== Biography ==
=== Early life ===
Daniel Gorman was born on April 12, 1861, in Wyoming, Iowa, to John and Mary (née Rooney) Gorman. His father was born in County Sligo, Ireland, and his mother in Montreal, Quebec. After graduating from Wyoming High School, he entered St. Joseph's College in Dubuque. He continued his studies at St. Francis Seminary in Milwaukee, Wisconsin.

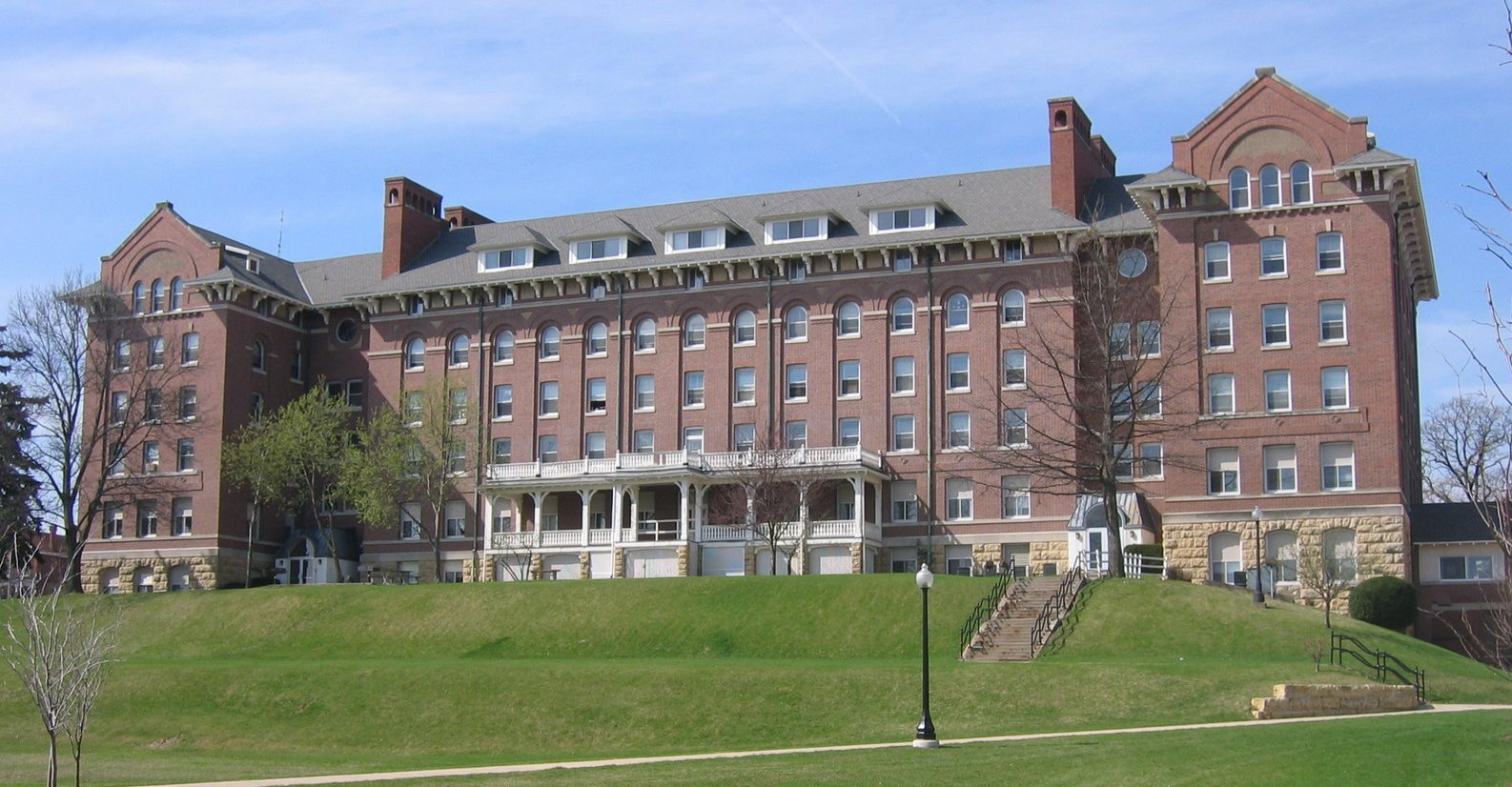
Loras College (formerly St. Joseph College), Dubuque, Iowa (2005)

=== Priesthood ===
Gorman was ordained to the priesthood in Milwaukee for the Archdiocese of Dubuque by Archbishop John Joseph Frederick Otto Zardetti on June 24, 1893. He served as pastor of a small parish in State Center, Iowa, for one year before joining the faculty of St. Joseph's College. From 1904 to 1918, he served as president of St. Joseph's, known today as Loras College. During his tenure, St. Joseph saw its greatest expansion of grounds and building, the high school department was extended, and the four-year course was initiated in 1915. The Vatican elevated Gorman to the rank of protonotary apostolic on April 19, 1917.

=== Bishop of Boise ===
On February 6, 1918, Gorman was appointed the second bishop of Boise by Pope Benedict XV. He received his episcopal consecration at Saint Raphael's Cathedral in Dubuque on May 1, 1918, from Archbishop Giovanni Bonzano, with Bishops Mathias Lenihan and Joseph Glass, C.M., serving as co-consecrators. During his nine years as bishop, the clergy increased by 32 diocesan priests, construction of Cathedral of St. John the Evangelist was completed in Boise in 1921, and the enrollment in parish schools doubled.

Daniel Gorman died in Lewiston, Idaho, on June 9, 1927, at age 66.

Catholic Church titles
Preceded by Alphonse Joseph Glorieux	Bishop of Boise; 1918–1927	Succeeded by Edward Kelly
