= Sylvester William Treinen =

American prelate

His Excellency, The Most Reverend Sylvester William Treinen
- Bishop of Boise
- Church: Roman Catholic Church
- See: Diocese of Boise
- Predecessor: James Joseph Byrne
- Successor: Tod David Brown

Orders
- Ordination: June 11, 1946 by Vincent James Ryan
- Consecration: July 25, 1962 by Hilary Baumann Hacker

Personal details
- Born: November 19, 1917 Donnelly, Minnesota, US
- Died: September 30, 1996 (aged 78) Missoula, Montana, US
- Education: Crosier Seminary; Saint Paul Seminary
- Motto: Super omnia caritas (Above all, charity)

Styles of Sylvester William Treinen
- Reference style: The Most Reverend
- Spoken style: Your Excellency
- Religious style: Monsignor

Sylvester William Treinen (November 19, 1917 – September 30, 1996) was an American prelate of the Roman Catholic Church. He served as bishop of the Diocese of Boise in Idaho from 1962 to 1988.

== Biography ==
=== Early life ===
Sylvester Treinen was born on November 19, 1917 in Donnelly, Minnesota, to William John and Kathryn (née Krausen) Treinen. He attended Crosier Seminary in Onamia from 1935 to 1941, and earned a Bachelor of Arts degree from Saint Paul Seminary in Saint Paul, Minnesota, in 1943.

=== Priesthood ===
Treinen was ordained to the priesthood for the Diocese of Bismarck by Bishop Vincent James Ryan in Bismarck, North Dakota, on June 11, 1946.

After his ordination, the diocese assigned Treinen as a curate in Dickinson, North Dakota. He was appointed secretary in 1950 to Bishop Vincent James Ryan and his successor, Bishop Lambert Anthony Hoch and as a curate at the Cathedral of the Holy Spirit Parish in Bismarck. Treinen was named chancellor of the diocese in 1953 and curate at St. Anne's Parish in Bismarck in 1957. In 1959, he was named pastor of St. Joseph's Parish in Mandan, North Dakota.

=== Bishop of Boise ===
On May 23, 1962, Treinen was appointed the fifth bishop of Boise by Pope John XXIII. He received his episcopal consecration at the Cathedral of the Holy Spirit on July 25, 1962, from Bishop Hilary Baumann Hacker, with Bishops Peter William Bartholome and Lambert Hoch serving as co-consecrators. Treinen attended all four sessions of the Second Vatican Council in Rome between 1962 and 1965, and worked to implement the reforms of the Council in the diocese.

=== Retirement and legacy ===
After 26 years as bishop of Boise, Treinen retired on August 17, 1988. He was succeeded by Tod David Brown. Treinen served as the parish priest for St. Ann's Parish in Arco, Idaho after his retirement. Sylvester Treinen died on September 30, 1996, in Missoula, Montana, at age 78.

Catholic Church titles
Preceded by James Joseph Byrne	Bishop of Boise; 1962–1988	Succeeded by Tod David Brown
