= Patsy Gharrity =

American baseball player (1892-1966)

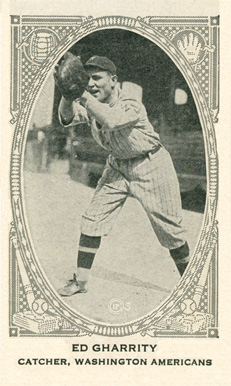
- Catcher/First baseman
- Born: March 13, 1892; Parnell, Iowa
- Died: October 10, 1966 (aged 74); Beloit, Wisconsin
- Batted: Right Threw: Right

MLB debut
- May 16, 1916, for the Washington Senators

Last MLB appearance
- July 31, 1930, for the Washington Senators

MLB statistics
- Batting average: .262
- Home runs: 20
- Runs batted in: 249
- Stats at Baseball Reference

Teams
- Washington Senators (1916–1923; 1929–1930)

Edward Patrick Gharrity (March 13, 1892 – October 10, 1966) was an American professional baseball player and coach.

== Life ==
The native of Parnell, Iowa, threw and batted right-handed, stood 5 feet 10 inches (1.78 m) tall and weighed 170 pounds (77 kg).

Primarily a catcher in Major League Baseball, he also played first base and the outfield for the Washington Senators from 1916 through 1923, appearing in 671 games over an eight-year period. After being out of baseball from 1924 to 1928, he served as a coach for Washington manager Walter Johnson in 1929 and 1930, getting into five more games as an active player. Gharrity coached under Johnson again from 1933 to 1935 when "The Big Train" was manager of the Cleveland Indians.

He died at age 74 in Beloit, Wisconsin.

== See also ==
- List of Major League Baseball players who spent their entire career with one franchise
