= Bishop Kelly High School =

Location
- 7009 West Franklin Road; Boise, Ada County, Idaho 83709; United States; 43.602°N 116.270°W

Information
- Type: Private
- Religious affiliation: Catholic
- Established: September 1964, 62 years ago
- Oversight: Diocese of Boise
- President: Bill Avey
- Principal: Sarah Quilici
- Teaching staff: 55.8 (on an FTE basis)
- Grades: 9–12
- Enrollment: 823 (2019–20)
- Colors: Black and gold
- Athletics: IHSAA Class 5A
- Athletics conference: Southern Idaho (5A) (SIC)
- Mascot: Knight
- Accreditation: Northwest Accreditation Commission
- Yearbook: Kelligian
- Feeder schools: Sacred Heart Catholic School; St. Ignatius Catholic School; St. Joseph's Catholic School; St. Mark's Catholic School; St. Mary's Catholic School; St. Paul's Catholic School
- Elevation: 2,705 ft (824 m) AMSL
- Website: www.bk.org

Bishop Kelly High School is a private Roman Catholic secondary school in Boise, Idaho, operated by the Diocese of Boise. One of two Catholic high schools in the state of Idaho, its school colors are black and gold and the mascot is a knight.

== History ==
Bishop Kelly High School was established in the fall of 1964, succeeding St. Teresa's Academy, which had closed that spring.

St. Teresa's Academy was Boise's first high school, private or public, established in 1890 by the Sisters of the Holy Cross as a high school and boarding school for young women. Later, St. Joseph's School was built to offer Catholic education to the young men of the area, with an elementary school occupying the lower level and a high school on the upper floor.

In 1933, the two high schools joined to form the co-educational St. Teresa's Academy, which educated both Catholic and non-Catholic students until its closure in 1964. Boise's public high school was established in 1902.

== Namesake ==
The school is named for Edward Joseph Kelly (1890–1956), the third Bishop of Boise and the first native of the Pacific Northwest to be appointed a bishop. Born in The Dalles, Oregon, he was ordained in 1917 and became Bishop of Boise at age 38 in 1928. Kelly served 28 years as bishop, until his death at age 66.

== Athletics ==
The Bishop Kelly Knights field 32 athletic teams and compete in IHSAA Class 4A in the Southern Idaho Conference (4A).

=== State titles ===
Boys

- Football (6): fall (A-2, now 3A) 1994; (4A) 2004, 2005, 2010, 2013, 2014, 2015 (official with introduction of A-2 playoffs, fall 1978)
- Cross Country (5): fall (B, now 4A) 1985; (4A) 2001, 2005, 2008, 2022
- Basketball (2): (A-2, now 3A) 1991, 1998
- Baseball (6): (A-2, now 3A) 1995, 2000, (4A) 2008, 2010, 2021, 2022 (IHSAA does not sponsor a state baseball tournament; does not keep records)
- Soccer (2): (A-2, now 3A) 1996, (4A) 2021
- Track (10): (A-2, now 3A) 1976, 1981; (4A) 2002, 2005, 2006, 2007, 2016, 2017, 2018, 2021, 2022, 2023
- Golf (12): (Class B, now 3A) 1969, 1970, 1971, 1994, 1996; (A-2, now 3A) 1998, 1999; (4A) 2003, 2004, 2005, 2010, 2017, 2022
- Tennis (2): (4A) 2014, 2015, 2016, 2021 (combined team until 2008, see below)
- Lacrosse (1): 2011 (club sport, records not kept by IHSAA)
- Swimming (3): 2017, 2019, 2021 (introduced in 2017)

Girls

- Cross Country (12): fall (3A) 1998, 1999; (4A) 2001, 2003, 2004, 2005, 2006, 2007, 2009, 2010, 2011, 2018 (introduced in 1974)
- Soccer (9): fall (A-1, now 5A) 2001; (4A) 2007, 2008, 2010, 2011, 2012, 2016, 2017, 2018 (introduced in 2000)
- Basketball (1): 2013
- Track (7): (A-2, now 3A) 1994, 1999, 2000; (4A) 2004, 2010, 2012, 2021(introduced in 1971)
- Softball (11): (A-2, now 3A) 1997, 1998, 1999; (4A) 2001, 2003, 2005, 2006, 2007, 2013, 2015 , 2019, 2021, 2022 (introduced in 1997)
- Golf (10): (Class B, now 3A) 1992, 1995; (4A) 2001, 2005, 2006, 2007, 2008, 2012, 2013, 2014 (introduced in 1987)
- Swimming (2): 2017, 2021 (introduced in 2017)
- Tennis (3): 2019, 2021, 2022 (combined team until 2008, see below)

Combined

- Tennis (17): (Class B, now 3A) 1972, 1975, 1977, 1978, 1979, 1980, 1983, 1984, 1995, 1998, 1999, 2000; (4A) 2001, 2004, 2005, 2006, 2007 (combined until 2008)
- Hockey (2): 2014, 2021
  (club sport; players from other schools as well as BK compete on the Boise Knights team, which uses BK logos and colors)
- Band (1): 2016
- Speech (1): 2021
- Debate (6): (one classification) 2008, 2010, 2011; (small-school division) 2017, 2021, 2022
- Cheerleading (1): 2011 (non-stunt division; division discontinued in 2013)

== Notable alumni ==
- Butch Otter, Governor of Idaho (2007–19) - Class of 1962 (St. Teresa's)
- Michael Kirk, award-winning documentary filmmaker, Frontline - Class of 1965
- Ben Ysursa, Idaho Secretary of State (2003–15) - Class of 1967
- William Petersen, CSI actor/producer - Class of 1972
- David Bieter, Mayor of Boise (2004–19) - Class of 1978
- Mike Luckovich, editorial cartoonist - Class of 1978
- Max Butler, former security consultant and online hacker; arrested for the theft of over 2 million credit card numbers. - Class of 1990
- Joe Bleymaier, Pass Game Coordinator - Kansas City Chiefs
- Nick Symmonds, runner, two-time Olympian - Class of 2002
- Cody Hawkins, Colorado quarterback, Idaho State head coach - Class of 2006
- Josh Osich, MLB pitcher (2015–present), Oregon State (2008–11) - Class of 2007
- Benito Skinner, actor and comedian - Class of 2012
