= Thomas R. Byrne =

American politician (1923–2009)

Thomas Richard Byrne Sr.
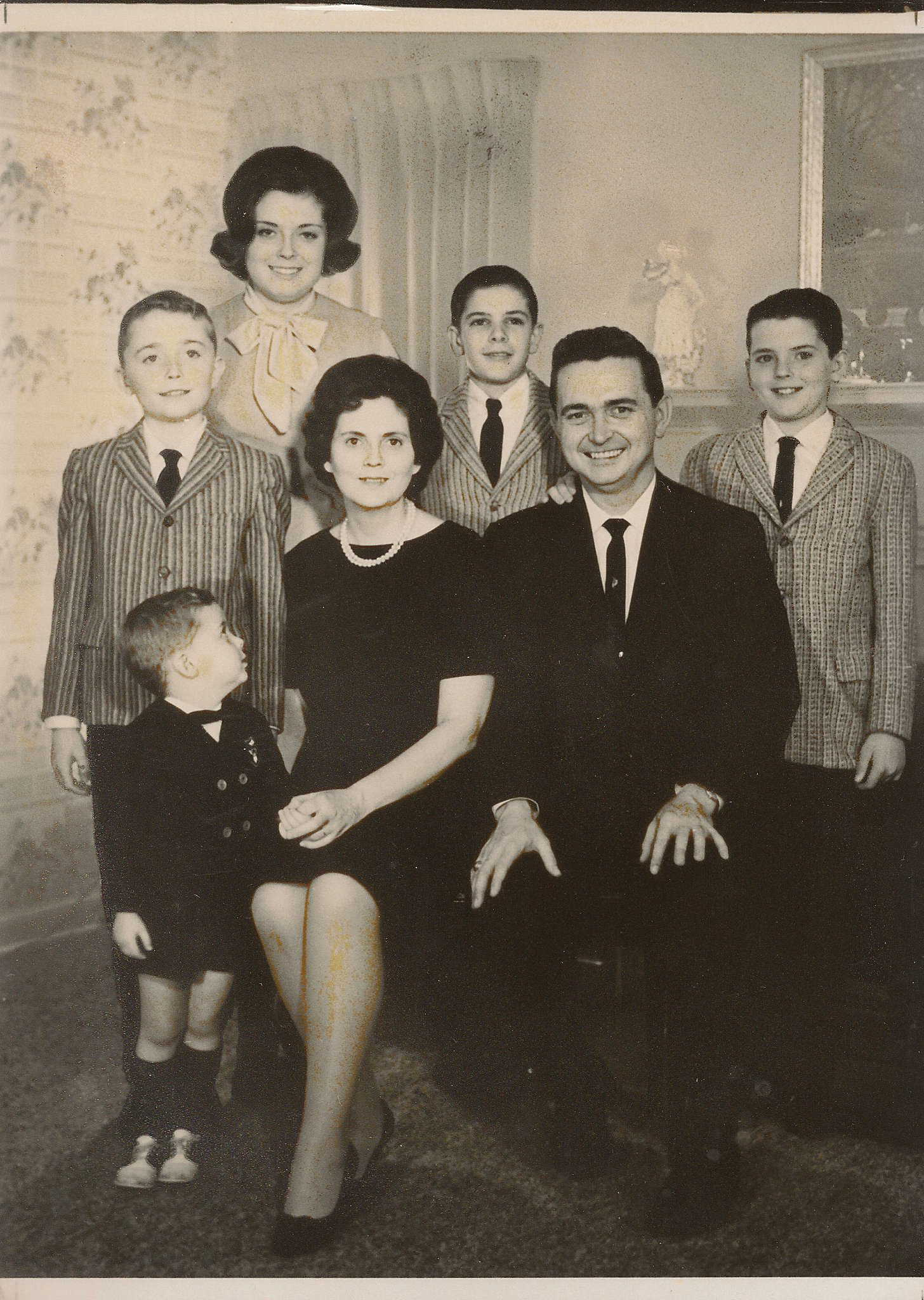
- Mayor Byrne with family c. 1963

46th Mayor of St. Paul
- In office 1966–1970
- Preceded by: George J. Vavoulis
- Succeeded by: Charles P. McCarty
- Constituency: Saint Paul, Minnesota

Personal details
- Born: Thomas Richard Byrne; March 9, 1923 Saint Paul, Minnesota, U.S.
- Died: April 5, 2009 (aged 86) Saint Paul, Minnesota, U.S.
- Resting place: Calvary Cemetery, Saint Paul, Minnesota, U.S.
- Party: Democratic-Farmer-Labor
- Spouse: Mary Therese Barrett
- Children: 7
- Profession: Teacher, politician

Thomas Richard Byrne Sr. (March 9, 1923 – April 5, 2009) was an American politician in Minnesota. He was the Democratic mayor of Saint Paul from 1966 to 1970. He was Catholic and fully Irish. He served in the U.S. Army Air Force in World War II. He was a member of the American Legion and the Veterans of Foreign Wars.

His brother the Most Reverend James Byrne was an auxiliary bishop in the Roman Catholic Archdiocese of Saint Paul, and later the Archbishop of Dubuque, Iowa. His brother Robert Byrne was an instructor of Latin at Saint Thomas Military Academy, in Saint Paul and later in Mendota Heights, Minnesota.
