= William Edwin Franklin =

American Catholic prelate (1930–2026)

His Excellency, The Most Reverend William Edwin Franklin DD
- Bishop of Davenport
- Church: Catholic Church
- Archdiocese: Dubuque
- Diocese: Davenport
- Appointed: November 12, 1993
- Installed: January 20, 1994
- Retired: October 12, 2006
- Predecessor: Gerald Francis O'Keefe
- Successor: Martin John Amos
- Previous posts: Auxiliary Bishop of Dubuque and Titular Bishop of Surista (1987–1993)

Orders
- Ordination: February 4, 1956 by Leo Binz
- Consecration: April 1, 1987 by Daniel Kucera, James Joseph Byrne, and Francis John Dunn

Personal details
- Born: May 3, 1930 Parnell, Iowa, U.S.
- Died: April 10, 2026 (aged 95) Davenport, Iowa, U.S.
- Education: Loras College; Mount St. Bernard's Seminary
- Motto: Faith, Hope, Love

William Edwin Franklin (May 3, 1930 – April 10, 2026) was an American prelate of the Roman Catholic Church, He served as an auxiliary bishop of Archdiocese of Dubuque in Iowa from 1987 to 1993, and as bishop of the Diocese of Davenport, also in Iowa, from 1993 to 2006.

== Biography ==
=== Early life ===
Franklin was born on May 3, 1930, in Parnell, Iowa, the son of John and Matilda (Milholin) Franklin. He was educated in the local parochial school and at the former St. Patrick High School in Cedar Rapids, Iowa. He graduated from Loras College in Dubuque, and studied for the priesthood at Mount St. Bernard's Seminary in Dubuque.

=== Priesthood ===
Franklin was ordained a priest for the Archdiocese of Dubuque on February 4, 1956, by Archbishop Leo Binz in St. Raphael's Cathedral in Dubuque. His initial assignment after ordination was as secretary to Archbishop Emeritus Henry Rohlman before being named associate pastor of St. John's Parish in Independence, Iowa. From 1959 to 1974, Franklin was a faculty member at Wahlert High School in Dubuque. From 1974 to 1976 he served as associate pastor of St. Mary's Parish and a member of the faculty of Columbus High School, both in Waterloo, Iowa.

Franklin served as the pastor of St. Francis of Assisi Parish in Fayette, Iowa and St. Francis Xavier Parish in Hawkeye, Iowa from 1976 to 1980. Franklin became pastor in 1980 of Immaculate Conception Parish in Gilbertville, Iowa before becoming pastor of St. Edward Parish in Waterloo, Iowa. In 1984, he was assigned as dean of the Waterloo Deanery.

=== Auxiliary Bishop of Dubuque ===
On January 29, 1987, Franklin was named titular bishop of Surista and as an auxiliary bishop of Dubuque by Pope John Paul II. He was ordained a bishop by Archbishop Daniel Kucera on April 1, 1987, in St. Raphael's Cathedral in Dubuque. Archbishop Emeritus James Byrne and Auxiliary Bishop Francis Dunn acted as the principal co-consecrators. After his ordination, Franklin was assigned to be the episcopal vicar of the Waterloo Region of the archdiocese. His office was in St. Joseph Rectory in Waterloo.

=== Bishop of Davenport ===
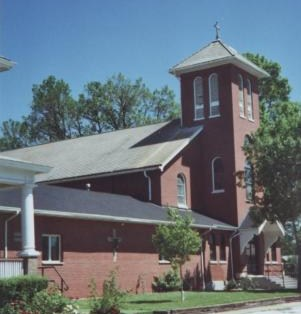
St. Alphonsus Church, Davenport, Iowa (1992)

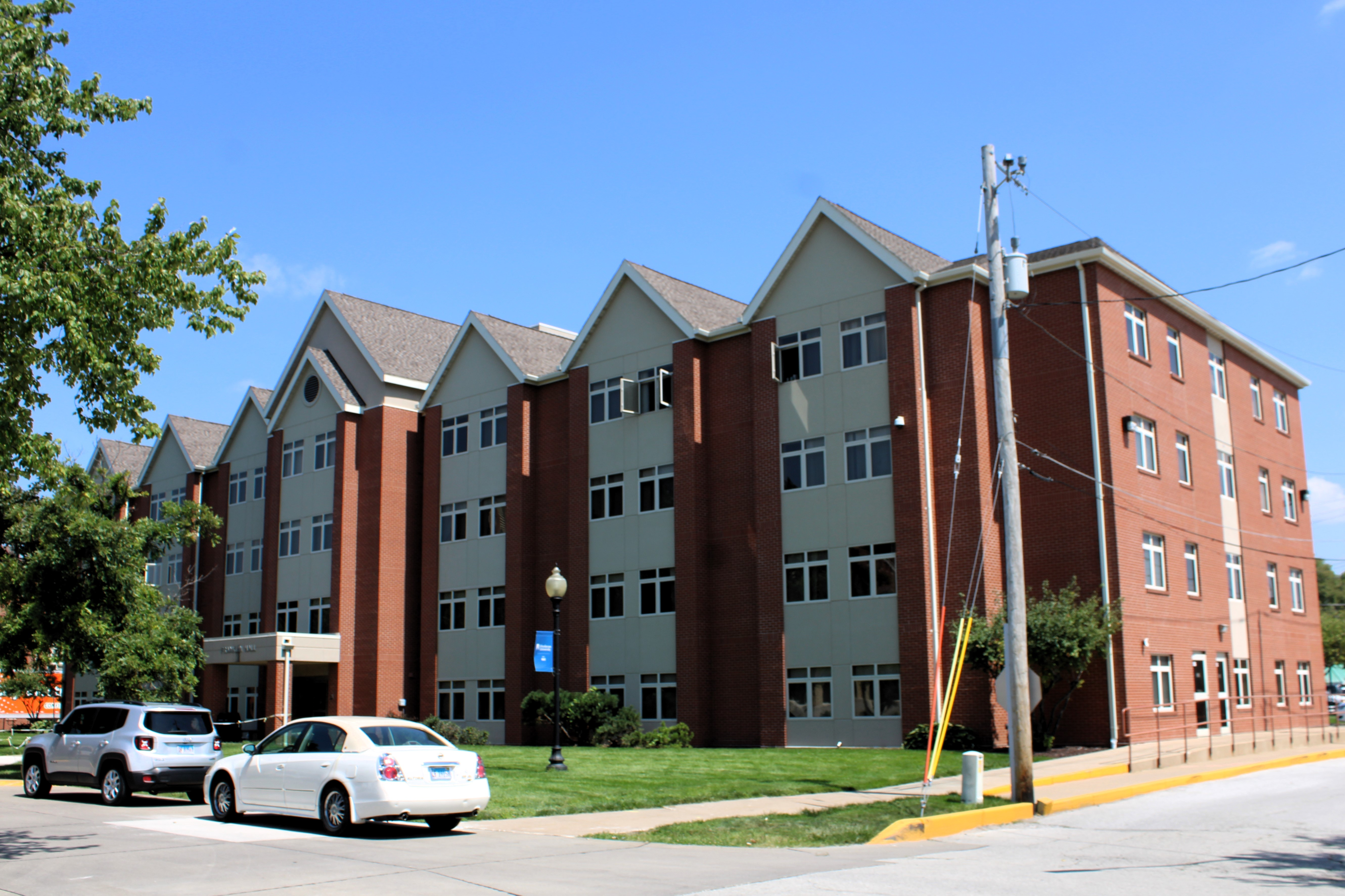
Franklin Hall, St. Ambrose University, Davenport, Iowa (2023)

On November 12, 1993, John Paul II named Franklin as the seventh bishop of Davenport. He was installed January 20, 1994, by Kucera in Sacred Heart Cathedral in Davenport. The apostolic nuncio to the United States, Archbishop Agostino Cacciavillan, attended the ceremony.

Franklin revised the diocesan staff, creating an Office of Pastoral Services that combined the ministries of liturgy, education, and social action into the same office to facilitate better communication. He replaced the diocesan pastoral council with a pastoral council convocation. The convocation drew together clergy, religious orders, and parishioners for their input and formation. Franklin also restructured the deaneries to include deanery councils, again to better facilitate communication between the diocese and its parishioners.

In 2002, Franklin received allegations of sexual abuse of minors in the 1970's by Reverend William Wiebler. After Wiebler confessed his crimes to Franklin, the bishop sent him to the Vianney Renewal Center, a treatment facility for priests in Dittmer, Missouri. Wiebler later checked out of the facility, however, and moved into a private residence in University City, Missouri, outside the diocese. In 2004, the diocese settled the claims of 37 sexual abuse victims for $9 million; one of the priests named in the settlement was Wiebler. He was laicized in January 2006, several months before his death.

On October 10, 2006, the diocese filed for Chapter 11 bankruptcy protection. According to Franklin, this was to properly manage the settlement of sexual abuse lawsuits facing the diocese.

=== Retirement and death ===
On October 12, 2006, Pope Benedict XVI accepted Franklin's letter of resignation as bishop of Davenport.In retirement he resided at St. Vincent Center followed by the Kahl Home, both in Davenport. Franklin Hall, a residence hall at St. Ambrose University in Davenport is named in his honor. Franklin died on April 10, 2026, at the age of 95. His funeral was celebrated at Sacred Heart Cathedral and he was buried in Mount Calvary Cemetery in Davenport.

== See also ==
- Historical list of the Catholic bishops of the United States
- List of Catholic bishops of the United States

Catholic Church titles
Preceded by Gerald Francis O'Keefe	Bishop of Davenport; 1993–2006	Succeeded by Martin John Amos
Preceded by Daniel Leo Ryan	Titular Bishop of Surista; 1987–1983	Succeeded by Stanislav Szyrokoradiuk
Preceded by —	Auxiliary Bishop of Dubuque; 1987–1983	Succeeded by —
