= Michael Patrick Driscoll =

American prelate

His Excellency, The Most Reverend Michael Patrick Driscoll
- Bishop of Boise
- Archdiocese: Portland
- Diocese: Boise
- Appointed: January 18, 1999
- Installed: March 17, 1999
- Term ended: November 24, 2014
- Predecessor: Tod David Brown
- Successor: Peter F. Christensen
- Previous post: Auxiliary Bishop of Orange

Orders
- Ordination: May 1, 1965 by James Francis McIntyre
- Consecration: March 6, 1990 by Norman Francis McFarland, John Thomas Steinbock, and Thomas Joseph Connolly

Personal details
- Born: August 8, 1939 Long Beach, California, US
- Died: October 24, 2017 (aged 78) Boise, Idaho, US
- Motto: Caritas Christi (The love of Christ)

Styles of Michael Patrick Driscoll
- Reference style: His Excellency; The Most Reverend
- Spoken style: Your Excellency
- Religious style: Bishop

Michael Patrick Driscoll (August 8, 1939 – October 24, 2017) was an American prelate of the Roman Catholic Church. He served as the seventh bishop of the Diocese of Boise in Idaho from 1999 to 2014. Driscoll previously served as an auxiliary bishop of the Diocese of Orange in California from 1990 to 1999.

== Early life ==
Michael Driscoll was born on August 8, 1939, in Long Beach, California. As a child, he would pretend to celebrate mass, giving Necco candy wafers as communion to his younger siblings. He attended St. John's Seminary in Camarillo, California,

== Priesthood ==
Driscoll was ordained to the priesthood for the Archdiocese of Los Angeles by Cardinal James McIntyre on May 1, 1965. After his ordination, the archdiocese assigned Driscoll to pastoral assignments at parishes in Los Angeles and Burbank, California. He earned a Master of Social Work degree from the University of Southern California in Los Angeles in 1973.

After the erection of the Diocese of Orange in 1976, Driscoll served as its first chancellor. He also held the posts of vicar for religious and charities, and vicar general.

== Auxiliary Bishop of Orange ==
On December 19, 1989, Driscoll was appointed auxiliary bishop of Orange and titular bishop of Maxita by Pope John Paul II. He received his episcopal consecration at the Cathedral of the Holy Family in Orange, California, on March 6, 1990, from Bishop Norman McFarland, with Bishops John Steinbock and Thomas Connolly serving as co-consecrators.

== Bishop of Boise ==
Driscoll was named bishop of Boise on January 18, 1999 by John Paul II. Replacing Bishop Tod Brown, he was formally installed on March 17, 1999.

Driscoll in 2005 wrote to the Idaho Catholic Register, apologizing for his handling of sexual abuse cases in the Diocese of Orange during the late 1970s and 1980s. At that time, he was in charge of priest personnel in the diocese. He wrote that he was,

" deeply sorry for the way we handled cases [in Orange County] allowed children to be victimized by permitting some priests to remain in ministry, for not disclosing their behavior to those who might be at risk, and for not monitoring their actions more closely."

After 15 years in Boise, Driscoll retired on August 8, 2014. Driscoll died in Boise on October 24, 2017.

Catholic Church titles
Preceded by –	Bishop Emeritus of Boise; 2014–2017	Succeeded by –
Preceded by Tod David Brown	Bishop of Boise; 1999–2014	Succeeded by Peter F. Christensen
Preceded by -	Auxiliary Bishop of Orange; 1990–1999	Succeeded by -
