= Francis John Dunn =

20th-century American Catholic bishop

Most Reverend Francis J. Dunn JCL, DD
- Auxiliary Bishop of Dubuque
- Church: Catholic Church
- See: Titular See of Turris Tamalleni
- Appointed: June 1, 1969
- In office: August 27, 1969 – November 17, 1989

Orders
- Ordination: January 11, 1948 by Edward Aloysius Fitzgerald
- Consecration: August 27, 1969 by James Joseph Byrne

Personal details
- Born: March 22, 1922 Elkader, Iowa
- Died: November 17, 1989 (aged 67) Cedar Rapids, Iowa
- Motto: Light of God, guide my steps

Francis John Dunn (March 22, 1922 – November 17, 1989) was a bishop in the Catholic Church in the United States. He served as an auxiliary bishop of the Archdiocese of Dubuque in the state of Iowa from 1969 to 1989.

== Biography ==
=== Early life and ministry ===
Dunn was born in Elkader, Iowa, the son of Peter and Josephine (Feeney) Dunn. He was educated at St Joseph Grade and High School in Elkader before receiving his college education at Loras College in Dubuque. He studied for the priesthood at Kenrick Seminary in St. Louis.

Dunn was ordained a priest for the Archdiocese of Dubuque on January 11, 1948, by Auxiliary Bishop Edward Fitzgerald at St. Raphael's Cathedral. He served as the associate pastor at St. Cecilia Parish in Ames from 1948 to 1950, St. Martin Parish in Cascade from 1950 to 1952, and at Nativity Parish in Dubuque from 1952 to 1955. In 1956 he was named assistant chancellor and chaplain of St. Anthony's Home for the Aged in Dubuque. He was sent to Rome for further studies and when he returned he served as chancellor and head of the Family Life Bureau. From 1961 to 1969 he served as the chaplain for the Sisters of Charity of the Blessed Virgin Mary at the Mount Carmel Motherhouse and as Director of Catholic Cemeteries for the archdiocese.

=== Auxiliary Bishop of Dubuque ===
On June 1, 1969, Pope Paul VI named Dunn Titular Bishop of Turris Tamalleni and Auxiliary Bishop of Dubuque. He was ordained a bishop by Archbishop James Byrne of Dubuque in St. Raphael's Cathedral on August 27, 1969. The principal co-consecrators were Archbishop Leo Binz of St. Paul and Minneapolis and Bishop Edward Fitzgerald now of Winona. His was the first episcopal ordination in the archdiocese that used the Rite of Ordination in English. While he served as auxiliary bishop in Dubuque he was also the vicar general of the archdiocese and pastor of St. Joseph the Worker Church. On February 8, 1987, Archbishop Daniel Kucera announced his plans to divide the archdiocese into three regions with a resident bishop in each region. Bishop Dunn served the Cedar Rapids Region, Bishop William Franklin served the Waterloo Region, and the archbishop in Dubuque. Dunn died in Cedar Rapids, Iowa on November 17, 1989, at the age of 67.
