= Alphonse Joseph Glorieux =

Catholic bishop

His Excellency, The Right Reverend Alphonse Joseph Glorieux
- Bishop of Boise
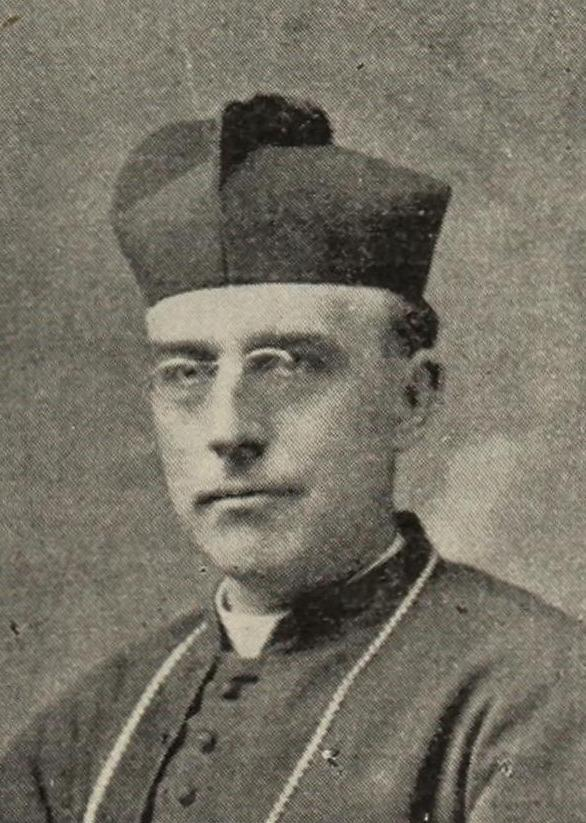
- Church: Catholic
- Diocese: Diocese of Boise
- Appointed: February 27, 1885
- Predecessor: Louis Aloysius Lootens
- Successor: Daniel Mary Gorman
- Previous post(s): Vicar Apostolic of Idaho

Orders
- Ordination: August 14, 1867 by Engelbert Sterckx
- Consecration: April 19, 1885 by James Gibbons

Personal details
- Born: February 1, 1844; Dottignies, Kingdom of Belgium
- Died: August 25, 1917 (aged 73); Portland, Oregon, U.S.A.
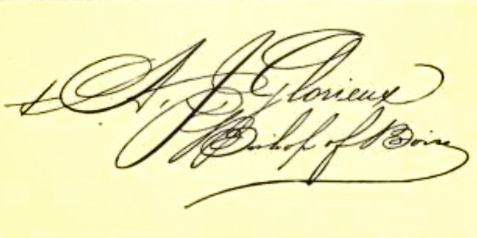
- Signature

Alphonse Joseph Glorieux (February 1, 1844 – August 25, 1917) was a Belgian-born prelate of the Roman Catholic Church. He served as the first bishop of the Diocese of Boise in Idaho from 1893 for 24 years until his death in 1917. He previously served as the vicar apostolic from 1885 to 1893 for the Apostolic Vicariate of Idaho.

== Biography ==
=== Early life ===
Alphonse Glorieux was born on February 1, 1844, in Dottignies, in the Province of Hainaut, in the Kingdom of Belgium to Auguste and Lucy (née Vanderghinste) Glorieux. He graduated from the Collège Saint-Amand in Kortrijk, Belgium in 1863, then entered the American College of the Immaculate Conception of Louvain in Leuven, Belgium to study for the priesthood. His goal was to serve as a missionary in the United States.

=== Priesthood ===
Glorieux was ordained a priest on August 17, 1867, by Cardinal Engelbert Sterckx in Mechelen, Belgium. In October 1867, two months after his ordination, Glorieux left Belgium, arriving in Portland, Oregon, in December 1867. He spent a few months in Portland as secretary to Bishop François Blanchet before doing missionary work in Jacksonville and Roseburg in Southern Oregon. After holding further posts in Oregon City and St. Paul, Oregon, he was appointed the first president of the newly established St. Michael's College, a school for boys in Portland, in 1871.

=== Vicar Apostolic of Idaho ===
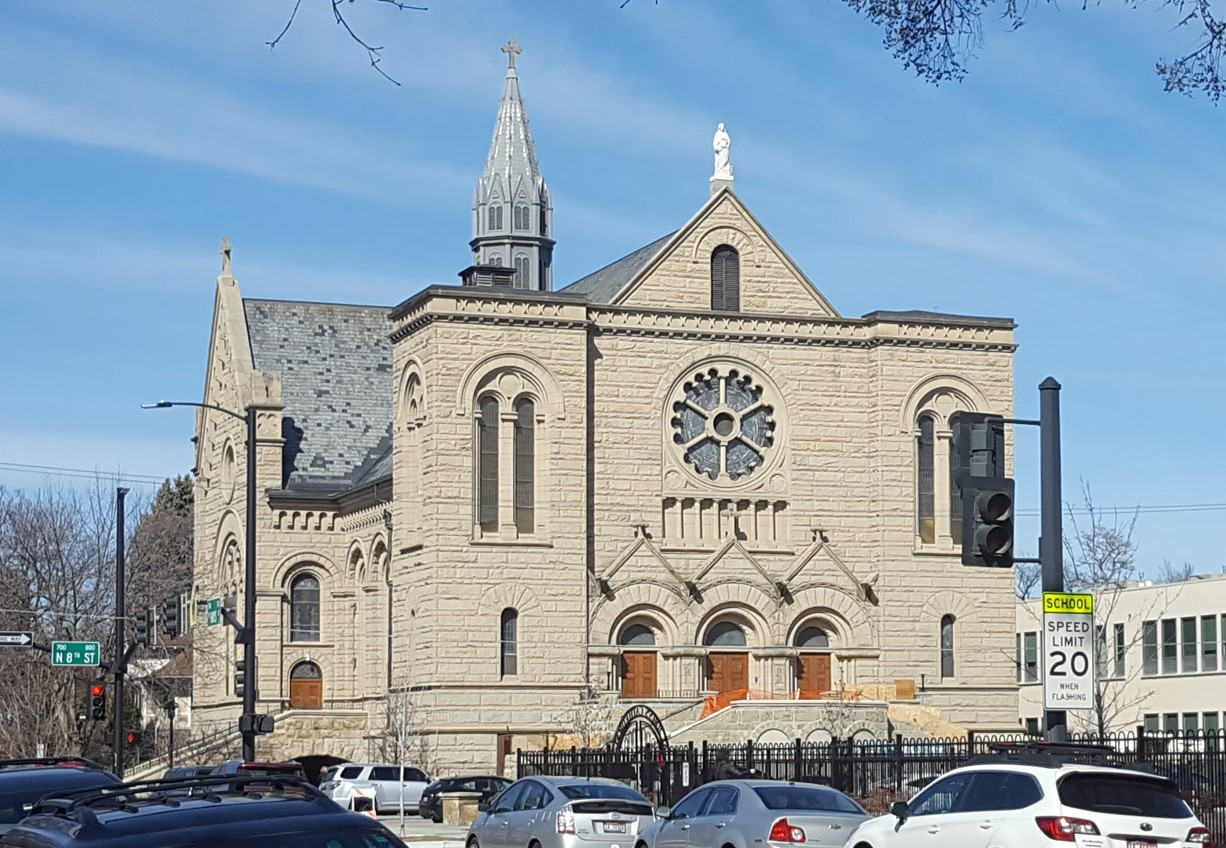
Cathedral of Saint John the Evangelist, Boise, Idaho (2020)

On February 27, 1885, Glorieux was named the first vicar apostolic of the Vicariate Apostolic of Idaho and titular bishop of Apollonia by Pope Leo XIII. Glorieux's appointment ended a nine-year vacancy following the resignation of Bishop Louis Lootens as vicar apostolic of Idaho and Montana. By 1885, the vicariate only included the new State of Idaho.

Glorieux received his episcopal consecration on April 19, 1885, from Archbishop James Gibbons, with Archbishop William Gross and Bishop Camillus Maes serving as co-consecrators, held at the Cathedral of the Assumption of the Blessed Virgin Mary in Baltimore.

=== Bishop of Boise ===
Leo XIII elevated the vicariate to the Diocese of Boise on August 25, 1893 and named Glorieux as its first bishop. During his 24-year tenure, the diocese saw significant growth. According to his obituary in the Idaho Statesman:

"The membership of the Catholic church in Idaho has multiplied itself eight times since Bishop Glorieux came to the state, and the number of its churches has increased in a like proportion...and he has been largely responsible for the building and maintenance of the several Catholic hospitals now carrying on their work in the state."

In 1906, Glorieux laid the cornerstone for the current Cathedral of St. John the Evangelist in Boise.

Alphonse Glorieux died at the old St. Vincent Hospital in Portland, Oregon on August 25, 1917, at the age of 73 years.

== See also ==
- Historical list of the Catholic bishops of the United States

Catholic Church titles
| Preceded by None (erected) | Bishop of Boise; 1893–1917 | Succeeded by Daniel Mary Gorman |
| Preceded by Louis Aloysius Lootens | Vicar Apostolic of Idaho; 1884–1893 | Succeeded by None (diocese erected) |
