= Roman Catholic Diocese of Boise Regions =

The Roman Catholic Diocese of Boise Regions are deaneries for geographic areas of the state of Idaho. The areas are further defined by parishes, stations, and chapels. The Diocese of Boise is a suffragan of the Roman Catholic Archdiocese of Portland.

== Northern Deanery ==
=== Parishes ===
- Bonners Ferry - St. Ann's Parish
- Coeur D'alene - St. Thomas Parish
- Coeur D'alene - St. Pius X Parish
- Desmet - Sacred Heart Indian Mission Parish
- Kellogg - St. Rita's Parish
- Post Falls - St. George's Parish
- Priest River - St. Catherine Of Siena Parish
- Saint Maries - St. Mary Immaculate Parish
- Sandpoint - St. Joseph Parish
- Wallace - St. Alphonsus Parish

=== Stations ===
- Harrison - Our Lady Of Perpetual Help Station
- Priest Lake - St. Blanche Station
- Worley - St. Michael's Station

=== Chapels ===
- Coeur d'Alene -St. Joan of Arc Chapel
- Clark Fork - Sacred Heart Chapel
- Mullan - St. Michael's Chapel
- Plummer - Our Lady Of Perpetual Help Chapel
- Rathdrum - St. Stanislaus Chapel
- Spirit Lake - St. Joseph's Chapel

== North-Central Deanery ==
=== Parishes ===
- Cottonwood - St. Mary's Parish
- Ferdinand - Assumption Parish
- Grangeville - Sts. Peter And Paul Parish
- Greencreek - St. Anthony's Parish
- Kamiah - St. Catherine Of Siena Parish
- Lewiston - All Saints Parish
- Moscow - St. Mary's Parish
- Moscow - St. Augustine's Catholic Center Parish
- Orofino - St. Therese's Of The Little Flower Parish

=== Stations ===
- Genesee - St. Mary's Station
- Lapwai - Sacred Heart Station
- Nezperce - Holy Trinity Station
- Potlatch - St. Mary's Station

=== Chapels ===
- Keuterville - Holy Cross Chapel
- Pierce - Our Lady Of Woodland Chapel

== West-Central Deanery ==
=== Parishes ===
- Boise - St. Mary's Parish
- Boise - St. Mark's Parish
- Boise - Church Of The Sacred Heart Parish
- Boise - Risen Christ Catholic Community Parish
- Boise - Our Lady Of The Rosary Parish
- Boise - St. John's Cathedral Parish
- Emmett - Sacred Heart Parish
- Mccall - Our Lady Of The Lake Parish
- Meridian - Holy Apostles Parish
- Mountain Home - Our Lady Of Good Counsel Parish
- Mountain Home - St. Mary's Of Mountain Home A.F.B. Parish

=== Stations ===
- Bruneau - St. Bridget's Station
- Cascade - St. Katharine Drexel Station
- Garden Valley - St. Jude's Station
- Glenns Ferry - Our Lady Of Limerick Station

=== Chapels ===
- Grand View - St. Henry's Chapel
- Horseshoe Bend - Our Lady Queen Of Angels Chapel
- Idaho City - St. Joseph's Chapel
- Riggins - St. Jerome's Chapel

== Western Deanery ==
=== Parishes ===
- Caldwell - Our Lady Of The Valley Parish
- Fruitland - Corpus Christi Parish
- Nampa - St. Paul's Parish
- Weiser - St. Agnes Parish

=== Stations ===
- Cambridge - Holy Rosary Station
- Council - St. Jude The Apostle Station
- Melba - St. Joseph's Station

=== Chapels ===
- Homedale - St. Hubert's Chapel
- Oreana - Our Lady Queen Of Heaven Chapel
- Parma - Sacred Hearts Of Jesus And Mary Chapel
- Payette - Corpus Christi Chapel
- Silver City - Our Lady Of Tears Chapel

== Southern Deanery ==
=== Parishes ===
- Buhl - Immaculate Conception Parish
- Burley - St. Therese's Little Flower Parish
- Gooding - St. Elizabeth's Parish
- Hailey - St. Charles Borromeo Parish
- Jerome - St. Jerome's Parish
- Rupert - St. Nicholas Parish
- Shoshone - St. Peter's Parish
- Sun Valley-Ketchum - Our Lady Of The Snows Parish
- Twin Falls - St. Edward The Confessor Parish

=== Stations ===
- Hagerman - St. Catherine's Station
- Wendell - St. Anthony's Station

=== Chapels ===
- Fairfield - Immaculate Conception Chapel
- Twin Falls - Our Lady Of Guadalupe Chapel

== Eastern Deanery ==
=== Parishes ===
- Aberdeen/American Falls - Presentation Of The Lord Parish
- Blackfoot - St. Bernard's Parish
- Idaho Falls - Idaho Falls Catholic Community Parish
- Pocatello - Holy Spirit Catholic Community Parish
- Saint Anthony - Mary Immaculate Parish
- Salmon - St. Charles Parish
- Soda Springs - Good Shepherd Catholic Community Parish

=== Stations ===
- Arco - St. Ann's Station
- Challis - St. Louise Station
- Driggs - Good Shepherd Community Station
- Island Park - Chapel Of The Pines Station
- Mackay - St. Barbara's Station
- Mud Lake - St. Ann's Station
- Rexburg - St. Patrick's Station
- Roberts - St. Anthony's Station

=== Chapels ===
- Aberdeen - Blessed Sacrament Chapel
- American Falls - St. Mary's Chapel
- Chubbuck - St. Paul's Chapel
- Fort Hall - Blessed Kateri Tekakwitha Chapel
- Lava Hot Springs - Our Lady Of Lourdes Chapel
- Leadore - St. Joseph's Chapel
- Montpelier - Blessed Sacrament Chapel
- Pingree - St. John's Chapel
- Pocatello - St. Joseph's Chapel
- Pocatello - St. Anthony Of Padua Chapel
- Preston - St. Peter's Chapel
- Shelley - Our Lady Of Guadalupe Chapel
- Soda Springs - St. Mary's Chapel

== See also ==
- List of Roman Catholic dioceses
- Roman Catholic Archdiocese of Portland
