= Edward Kelly (American bishop) =

American prelate

His Excellency, The Most Reverend Edward Joseph Kelly D.D.
- Bishop of Boise
- Diocese: Boise (all of Idaho)
- Predecessor: Daniel Mary Gorman
- Successor: James Joseph Byrne

Orders
- Ordination: June 2, 1917 by Basilio Pompilj
- Consecration: March 6, 1928 by Joseph Francis McGrath

Personal details
- Born: Edward Joseph Kelly; February 26, 1890 The Dalles, Oregon, US
- Died: April 21, 1956 (aged 66) Boise, Idaho, US
- Buried: Morris Hill Cemetery, Boise
- Denomination: Catholic
- Parents: James Leo Kelly; Henrietta (Wakefield) Kelly
- Education: Columbia University Oregon; St. Patrick's Seminary; Propaganda University

Edward Joseph Kelly (February 26, 1890 – April 21, 1956) was an American prelate of the Catholic Church. He served as bishop of the Diocese of Boise (all of Idaho) from 1927 until his death in 1956.

== Biography ==
=== Early years ===
Kelly was born on February 26, 1890, in The Dalles, Oregon, the third of five children of James Leo and Henrietta (née Wakefield) Kelly. He received his early education at St. Mary's Academy in The Dalles, and classical studies at Columbia University in Portland.

Kelly began his studies for the priesthood at St. Patrick's Seminary in Menlo Park, California, and proceeded to the Pontifical North American College and Propaganda University in Rome.

=== Priesthood ===
Kelly was ordained a priest for the Diocese of Boise in Rome by Cardinal Basilio Pompilj on June 2, 1917. He then served as a missionary in the Diocese of Baker City until 1919, when he became a secretary to Bishop Joseph Francis McGrath of Baker City and chancellor of that diocese.

=== Bishop of Boise ===
On December 16, 1927, Kelly was appointed as the third bishop of Boise by Pope Pius XI. He received his episcopal consecration on March 6, 1928, at Saint Frances de Sales Cathedral in Baker from Bishop McGrath, with Bishops Mathias Lenihan and Charles White serving as co-consecrators. During a visit to Vatican City in 1934, Kelly was granted a private audience with Pius XI, conducted in Italian.

=== Death and legacy ===
While preparing to celebrate Saturday morning mass in Boise on April 21, 1956, Kelly succumbed to a heart attack and died at age 66; he was succeeded by Bishop James Byrne. Eight years later in 1964, Bishop Kelly High School (BK) opened in west Boise, named in his honor.

Catholic Church titles
Preceded by Daniel Mary Gorman	Bishop of Boise City; 1928–1956	Succeeded by James Joseph Byrne
