= James Byrne (archbishop of Dubuque) =

American prelate of the Catholic Church (1908–1996)

His Excellency, The Most Reverend James J. Byrne S.T.D.
- Archbishop of Dubuque
- Church: Catholic
- Archdiocese: Dubuque
- Appointed: March 7, 1962
- In office: May 8, 1962 – August 23, 1983
- Predecessor: Leo Binz
- Successor: Daniel Kucera
- Other post: Archbishop Emeritus of Dubuque (1983–1996)
- Previous posts: Titular Bishop of Etenna (1947–1956); Auxiliary Bishop of Archdiocese of St. Paul (1947–1956); Bishop of Boise (1956–1962)

Orders
- Ordination: June 3, 1933 by John Gregory Murray
- Consecration: July 2, 1947 by Amleto Giovanni Cicognani

Personal details
- Born: July 28, 1908 Saint Paul, Minnesota, U.S.
- Died: August 2, 1996 (aged 88) Dubuque, Iowa, U.S.
- Education: Nazareth Hall Preparatory Seminary; St. Paul Seminary; Catholic University of America
- Motto: Ad Jesum per Mariam; (To Jesus through Mary)
- Coat of arms

James Joseph Byrne (July 28, 1908 – August 2, 1996) was an American prelate of the Catholic Church. He served as archbishop of Dubuque in Iowa from 1962 to 1983, having previously served as auxiliary bishop of St. Paul in Minnesota (1947–1956) and bishop of Boise in Idaho (1956–1962).

== Biography ==
=== Early life ===
James Byrne was born on July 28, 1908, in Saint Paul, Minnesota, to Philip Joseph and Mary Agnes (née McMonigal) Вyrne. He had five brothers and three sisters; one of his brothers, Thomas R. Byrne, served as Mayor of St. Paul from 1966 to 1970. Another brother, Robert Byrne, was an instructor of Latin at Saint Thomas Military Academy. After graduating from parochial school, James Byrne attended Cretin High School in St. Paul.

Deciding to become a priest, Byrne enrolled at Nazareth Hall Preparatory Seminary in Arden Hill, Minnesota, in 1924. In 1927, he continued his studies for the priesthood at St. Paul Seminary in St. Paul. He earned a Bachelor of Sacred Theology from The Catholic University of America in Washington, D.C. in 1933.

=== Priesthood ===
On June 3, 1933, Byrne was ordained a priest for the Archdiocese of Saint Paul by Archbishop John Murray at St. Paul Cathedral in St. Paul. After his ordination, the archdiocese assigned Byrne as a curate at St. Peter's Parish in Mendota, Minnesota. He continued his studies at the Catholic University of Leuven in Leuven, Belgium, where he earned a Doctor of Sacred Theology degree in 1937. His thesis was titled: "Idea of Development of Doctrine in Anglican Writings of John Henry Newman."

Following his return to Minnesota, Byrne served as professor of philosophy and theology (1937 – 1945) and academic dean (1941 – 1945) at the College of St. Thomas. He was also a part-time professor of theology at the College of St. Catherine (1940 – 1947) and a professor of theology at St. Paul Seminary (1945 – 1947). In addition to his academic duties, he served as a chaplain at local religious institutions.

=== Auxiliary Bishop of Saint Paul ===
Ordination history of James Byrne
History
Episcopal consecration
- Consecrated by: Amleto Giovanni Cicognani (Apos. Del.)
- Date: July 2, 1947
Episcopal succession
Bishops consecrated by James Byrne as principal consecrator
- Francis John Dunn: August 27, 1969
- Lawrence Donald Soens: August 17, 1983

On May 10, 1947, Byrne was appointed auxiliary bishop of St. Paul and titular bishop of Etenna by Pope Pius XII. He received his episcopal consecration on July 2, 1947, from Archbishop Amleto Cicognani, with Bishops Thomas Welch and Francis Schenk serving as co-consecrators, at St. Paul Cathedral. He selected as his episcopal motto: Ad Jesum per Mariam (Latin: "To Jesus through Mary"). As an auxiliary bishop, Byrne served as pastor of Nativity Parish in St. Paul (1948 – 1956).

=== Bishop of Boise ===
Following the death of Bishop Edward Kelly, Pius XII named Byrne as the fourth bishop of Boise on June 16, 1956. His installation took place at Cathedral of St. John the Evangelist in Boise, Idaho, on August 29, 1956. He remained in Boise for nearly six years.

=== Archbishop of Dubuque ===
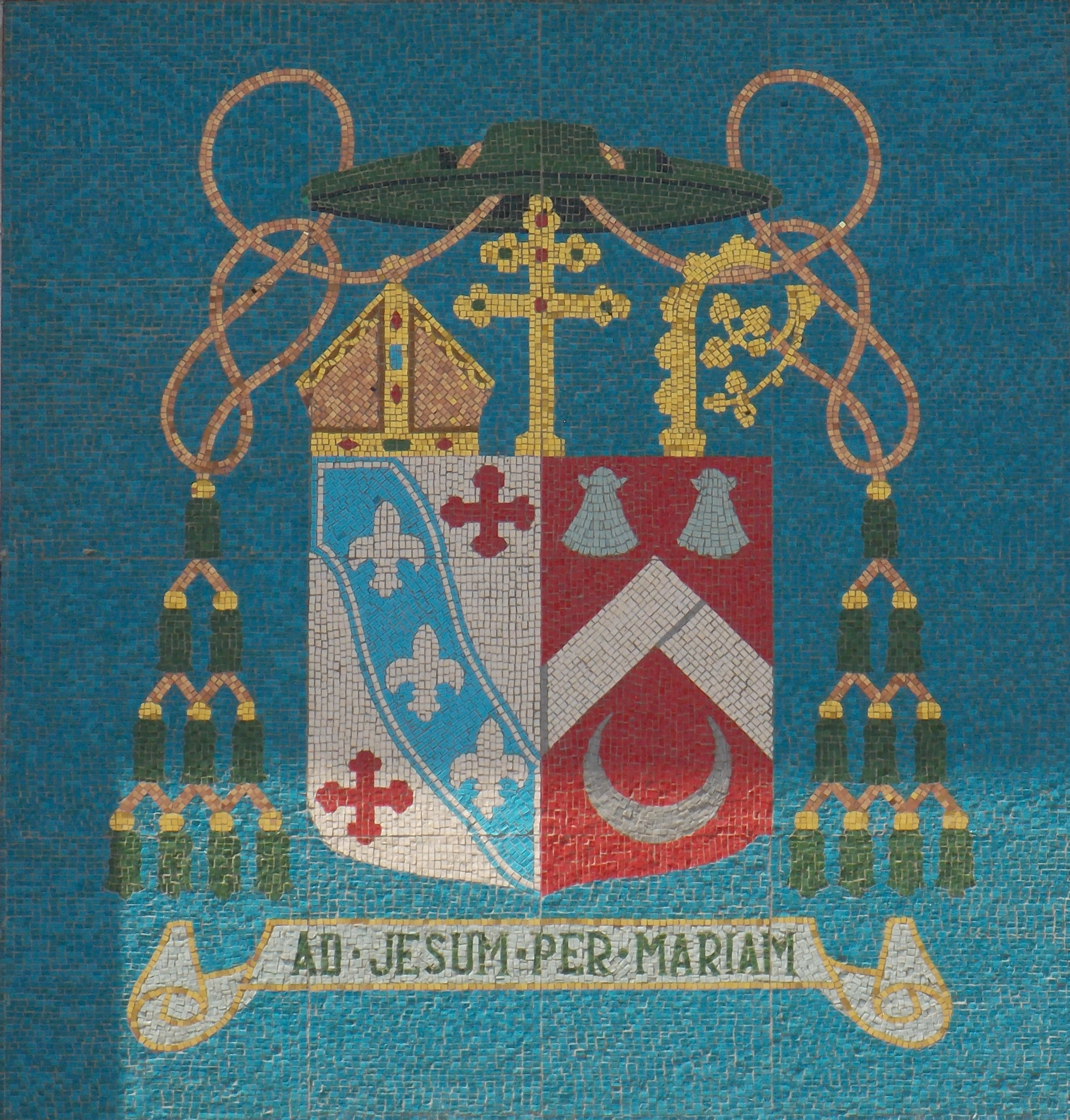
Archbishop Byrne's coat of arms over the main entrance into St. Raphael's Cathedral, Dubuque (2016)

Following the appointment of Archbishop Leo Binz to the Archdiocese of Saint Paul, Pope John XXIII named Byrne as the seventh archbishop of Dubuque on March 7, 1962. He was installed as archbishop by the apostolic delegate to the United States on May 8, 1962, in St. Raphael's Cathedral in Dubuque, Iowa. Byrne led the archdiocese for 21 years.

From 1962 to 1965, Byrne attended all four sessions of the Second Vatican Council in Rome. Following the council, he was responsible for implementing the reforms promulgated by the council within the archdiocese. During his time in office, Byrne maintained a relatively low profile in the community. He was noted for asking that Catholics join him in a televised recitation of the rosary before the evening news, and had cards produced that people could place on top of their television sets. Byrne also encouraged the growing cooperation among the Catholic and Protestant seminaries and colleges in Dubuque and often accepted invitations to participate in seminars and to speak to classes. On one occasion, in an airport, he encountered a Protestant seminarian he had come to know through these activities who was going to interview for a parish position and offered his blessing for his success and for his future ministry. He also devoted as much time as he could to visiting those who were hospitalized in Dubuque.

In 1966, the archdiocese was one of first dioceses in the nation to establish a priests' senate. The following year, Byrne established the archdiocesan board of education and inaugurated adult education was started at the parish level. The priest personnel board was established in 1968 to advise the archbishop on priest assignments. In 1969, due to a drop in enrollment, Byrne closed St. Bernard's Seminary in Dubuque.

In 1970, Byrne developed an interim pastoral council to act as an advisory and consultative group. Villa Raphael was opened in Dubuque in 1971 as a home for retired priests. In 1974, on the recommendation of the priests' senate, Byrne establish a permanent diaconate program in the archdiocese. On October 4, 1979, Pope John Paul II visited Iowa, with Byrne serving as his official host. Byrne also served as chancellor of Loras College in Dubuque.

=== Retirement and legacy ===
Pope John Paul II accepted Byrne's resignation as archbishop of Dubuque on August 23, 1983, and named him as archbishop emeritus of Dubuque. Following his retirement, Byrne remained in the Dubuque area.

Byrne died at the Stonehill Care Center in Dubuque on August 2, 1996, and was buried in the mortuary chapel of St. Raphael's Cathedral. Byrne had earlier purchased a simple wooden casket from the monks of New Melleray Abbey and stored it at the cathedral; this was the casket in which he was buried.

=== Controversy and handling of clergy sexual abuse ===
Byrne faced significant controversy regarding his handling of clergy sexual abuse cases during his tenure as archbishop of Dubuque. His approach to managing accused priests reflected the institutional practices of his era, though these methods would later be subject to criticism.

When allegations of abuse emerged, Byrne's typical response was to remove priests from their positions and send them for what was considered appropriate care or treatment at the time. He showed particular faith in psychological and mental health treatment approaches, combined with traditional spiritual interventions such as retreats, prayer, and penance. Byrne's approach was characterized by a strong belief in the possibility of rehabilitation and reform. His administrative decisions were reportedly influenced by the mental health expertise available at the time, though these practices would later be recognized as inadequate for addressing clergy sexual abuse.

Several cases during Byrne's leadership have been documented through legal proceedings. In one instance, Byrne relocated Reverend Patrick McElliott from St. John's Parish in Waterloo in 1963 following abuse allegations. McElliott allegedly went on to commit further offences in subsequent assignments. In another case, Byrne sent Reverend John A. Schmitz to a treatment program following complaints about his conduct, after which Schmitz was transferred to the Diocese of San Bernardino.

Catholic Church titles
Preceded by Leo Binz	Archbishop of Dubuque; 1962–1983	Succeeded by Daniel Kucera
Preceded by Edward Joseph Kelly	Bishop of Boise; 1956–1962	Succeeded by Sylvester William Treinen
Preceded by –	Auxiliary Bishop of St. Paul; 1947–1956	Succeeded by –
