= Diocese of Boise =

Latin Catholic jurisdiction in the US

Coordinates: 43°36′49″N 116°12′12″W

Diocese of Boise Diœcesis Xylopolitana
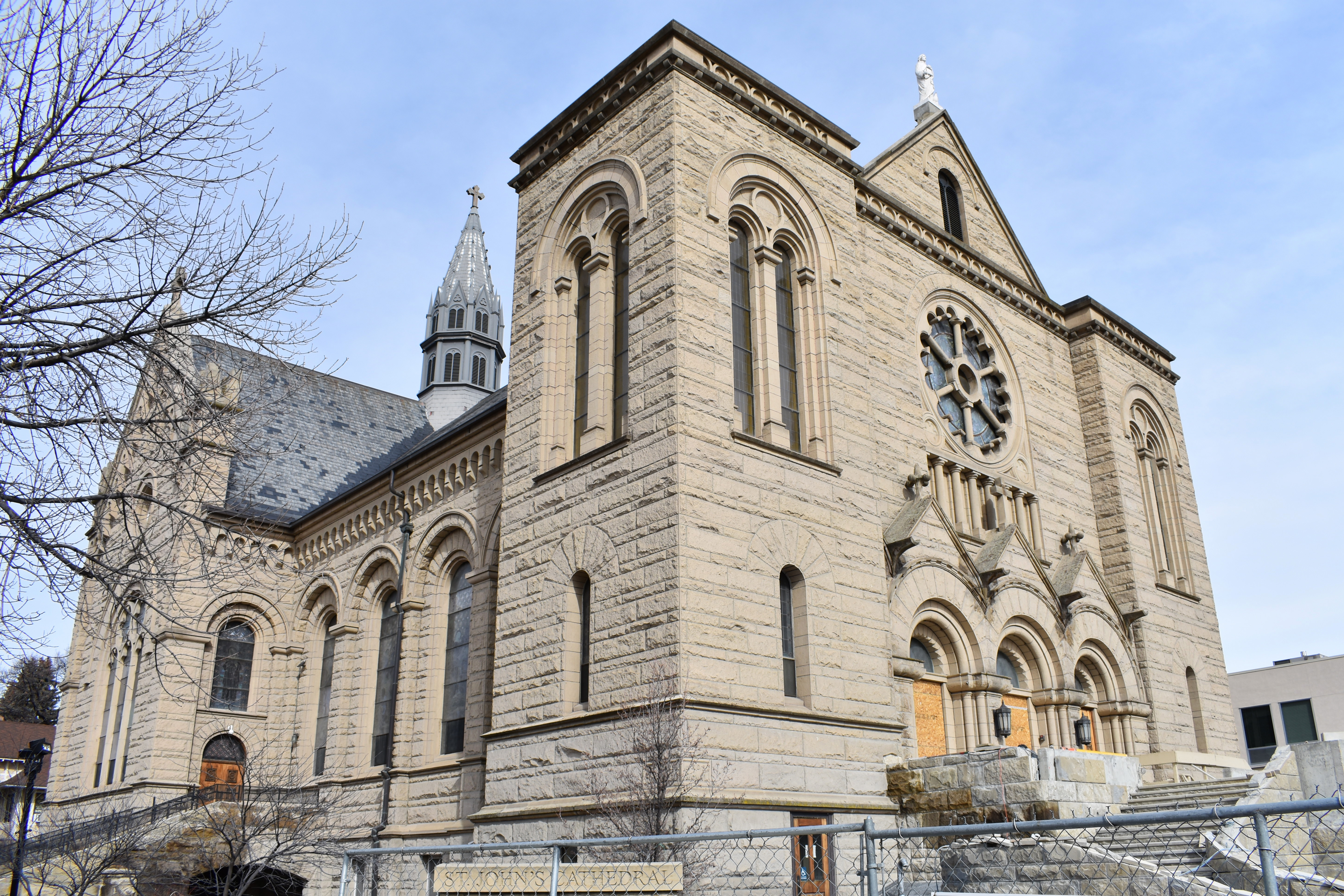
- Cathedral of St. John the Evangelist

- Coat of Arms of the Diocese of Boise

Location
- Country: United States
- Territory: State of Idaho
- Ecclesiastical province: Province of Portland

Statistics
- Area: 84,290 sq mi (218,300 km^{2})
- Population: Total; Catholics: (as of 2015); 1,612,136; 177,335 (11%)
- Parishes: 52

Information
- Denomination: Catholic Church
- Sui iuris church: Latin Church
- Rite: Roman Rite
- Established: August 25, 1893
- Cathedral: Cathedral of St. John the Evangelist
- Patron saint: Saint John the Evangelist

Current leadership
- Pope: Leo XIV
- Bishop: Peter F. Christensen
- Metropolitan Archbishop: Alexander King Sample

Map
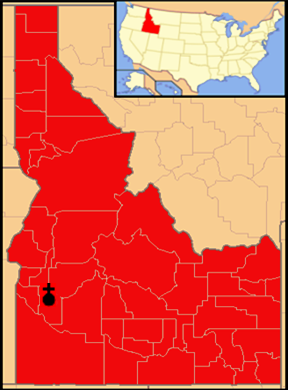

Website
- catholicidaho.org

The Diocese of Boise (Latin: Diœcesis Xylopolitana) is a diocese of the Catholic Church in Idaho in the United States. Its bishop is Peter F. Christensen, whose seat is the Cathedral of St. John the Evangelist in Boise. Covering the entire state of Idaho, the diocese is a suffragan diocese in the ecclesiastical province of the metropolitan Archdiocese of Portland.

== History ==
=== 1700 to 1860 ===
The first Catholics to arrive in present-day Boise were French-Canadian fur trappers in the mid-1700s. After the Louisiana Purchase in 1803, when the area became part of the United States, it fell under the jurisdiction of the Diocese of Baltimore in Maryland.

Over the next 25 years, the Nez Perce and Flathead tribes sent four delegations to St. Louis, Missouri to speak with Catholic officials, attempting to recruit a priest for their communities. In 1840, the Diocese of St. Louis sent Pierre-Jean De Smet, a Jesuit priest, to minister to the tribes. De Smet celebrated the mass in Idaho in July 1840 at Henry's Lake.

Nicholas Point in 1843 constructed the Cataldo Mission along the St. Joe River near present-day St. Maries. It was the first mission church in Idaho. The Cataldo Mission later moved to its present location on the Coeur d'Alene River. It is the oldest building in Idaho. With the establishment by the Vatican in 1846 of the Vicariate Apostolic of Oregon Territory, all of the Idaho area was under this jurisdiction. For the next 19 years, most of the Catholics in Idaho belonged to the Native American tribes.

=== 1860 to 1900 ===
With the discovery of gold in the Boise Basin in 1862, tens of thousands of miners flooded the area, including large numbers of Irish Catholics. Due to the area's growth, President Abraham Lincoln created the Territory of Idaho in 1863. That same year, the first church for the European Catholics, St. Joseph's, was built in the booming mining town of Idaho City.

Pope Pius IX in 1868 erected the Vicariate Apostolic of Idaho and Montana, covering a vast area west of the Northern Rockies. At that time, both the territory and the apostolic vicariate included the current state of Idaho and the western portions of Montana and Wyoming. The pope named Louis Lootens as the first vicar apostolic. When the vicariate was established, the population of Idaho was approximately 20,000, of whom only 1,500 were Catholic.

By the 1870s, the Idaho gold rush had ended, miners were leaving the territory and its towns were drying up. When Lootens' health began to fail, the Vatican allowed him to resign from the vicariate in 1876. The vicariate would be without a bishop for the next eight years.

In 1887, Pope Leo XIII appointed Alphonse Glorieux as the second vicar apostolic of Idaho and Montana. Glorieux designated Boise as his see city. On August 23, 1893, Leo XIII erected the Diocese of Boise, covering the entire state of Idaho. He appointed Glorieux as its first bishop. At that time, there were approximately 7,000 registered Catholics in the state. In 1894, the Sisters of the Holy Cross opened St. Alphonsus Hospital, the first hospital in Boise.

=== 1900 to 1950 ===
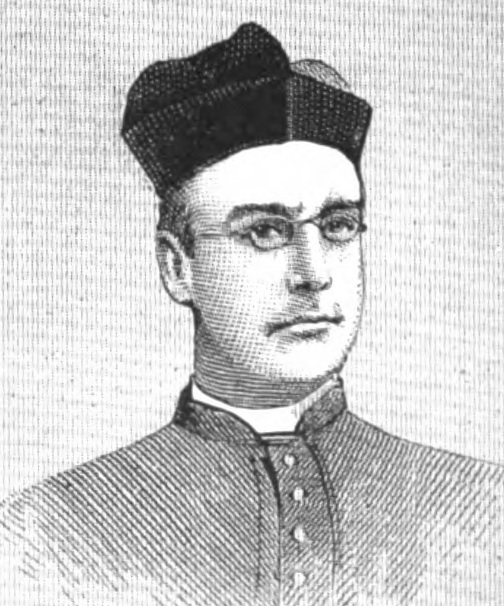
Bishop Glorieux (1889)

In 1906, Gladieux laid the cornerstone for the Cathedral of St. John the Evangelist in Boise. The opening of large tracts of land to settlement and the arrival of the railroad greatly increased the population of Idaho. The diocese grew dramatically over the following century. Many Catholic Basques from Spain began immigrating to Idaho early in the twentieth century to work in the sheep industry. Glorieux died in 1917.

Succeeding Glorieux as bishop in 1918 was Daniel Gorman from the Archdiocese of Dubuque. Gorman oversaw large growth within the diocese during his nine years as bishop. The ranks of the clergy rose by 32 diocesan priests, cathedral construction was completed, and enrollment in parish schools doubled. Gorman dedicated the Cathedral of Saint John the Evangelist in 1921.

After Gorman died in 1927, Edward Kelly succeeded him. Kelly served for 28 years until his death in 1956. The next bishop was Auxiliary Bishop James J. Byrne from the Archdiocese of St. Paul, who transferred to Boise in 1956.

=== 1950 to 2000 ===
Beginning in the middle of the twentieth century, large numbers of migrant workers from Mexico arrived in the diocese. Some settled permanently in the region, while many others remained migratory and would return to Mexico after the harvest. Toward the latter part of the century, the number of immigrants from Mexico and other parts of Latin America increased dramatically, with the majority of them settling permanently in the southern part of the diocese. People of Latin American heritage now constitute well over half of the Catholics within the diocese.

Byrne became archbishop of Dubuque in 1962. The fifth bishop of Boise, Sylvester W. Treinen from the Diocese of Bismarck, was his successor. He retired in 1988. Pope John Paul II then named Tod Brown from the Diocese of Monterey-Fresno as the sixth bishop of Boise in 1989. He became bishop of the Diocese of Orange in 1998. In 1999, Auxiliary Bishop Michael P. Driscoll of Orange succeeded him.

=== 2000 to present ===
After Driscoll retired In 2014, Bishop Peter F. Christensen of the Diocese of Superior transferred to Boise. He is the current bishop of Boise.

=== Sexual abuse ===
In 1985, Mel Baltazar was sentenced to seven years in prison after being convicted of lewd conduct with a 15-year-old boy. The priest met the victim when he was serving as a chaplain at St. Alphonsus Medical Center. The presiding judge stated that the Catholic Church protected Baltazar while he abused children in previous positions with other dioceses.

Deacon Robert Howell was arrested in November 2004 on charges of possessing child pornography. He pleaded guilty and was sentenced in March 2005 to 18 months in prison.

In September 2018, W. Thomas Faucher pleaded guilty to possession of child pornography, distribution of child pornography, and possession of marijuana. Chatroom conversations obtained by law enforcement revealed Faucher's intent to use marijuana to drug children and operate a child pornography ring that also involved rapes. Faucher had satanic interests and admitted to acts of blasphemy and desecration. That same year, two individuals reported to the diocese that they had been sexually abused as minors by Faucher. In December 2018, Faucher was sentenced to 25 years in prison. The diocese evicted Faucher from his house while he was in prison, and performed an exorcism on the property before putting it up for sale. In 2020, Faucher died in prison.

In 2019, the diocese released a list of 15 priests and one deacon with credible accusations of sexual abuse of children.

In April 2026, Nampa-based priest Robert Mendez Esquivel was sentenced to 15 years in prison three months after pleading guilty one count of child sexual battery by lewd or lascivious acts involved an alleged act of a 16 year old in August 2025. However, he will be eligible for parole after serving three years of this sentence.

== Coat of arms ==
Coat of arms of Diocese of Boise
Escutcheon Argent, a tree on a terrace vert, debruised by a fess embattled gules, and in dexter chief a cross patty-fitchy of the last Symbolism The arms imitate arms of Pope Leo XIII, who erected the see.

== Bishops ==
=== Apostolic Vicars of Idaho ===
1. Louis Aloysius Lootens (1868–1876), appointed Auxiliary Bishop of Vancouver Island
2. Alphonse Joseph Glorieux (1885–1893), appointed Bishop of Boise upon erection of diocese

=== Bishops of Boise ===
1. Alphonse Joseph Glorieux (1893–1917)
2. Daniel Mary Gorman (1918–1927)
3. Edward James Kelly (1927–1956)
4. James Joseph Byrne (1956–1962), appointed Archbishop of Dubuque
5. Sylvester William Treinen (1962–1988)
6. Tod David Brown (1988–1998), appointed Bishop of Orange
7. Michael Patrick Driscoll (1999–2014)
8. Peter F. Christensen (2014–present)

=== Other priest of this diocese who became a bishop ===
William Keith Weigand, appointed Bishop of Salt Lake City in 1980 and later Bishop of Sacramento

== Statistics ==
As of 2022, approximately 200,000 Catholics live within the Diocese of Boise. The diocese is divided into six deaneries containing 50 parishes, served by 92 diocesan priests and 31 religious priests.

== Medical centers ==
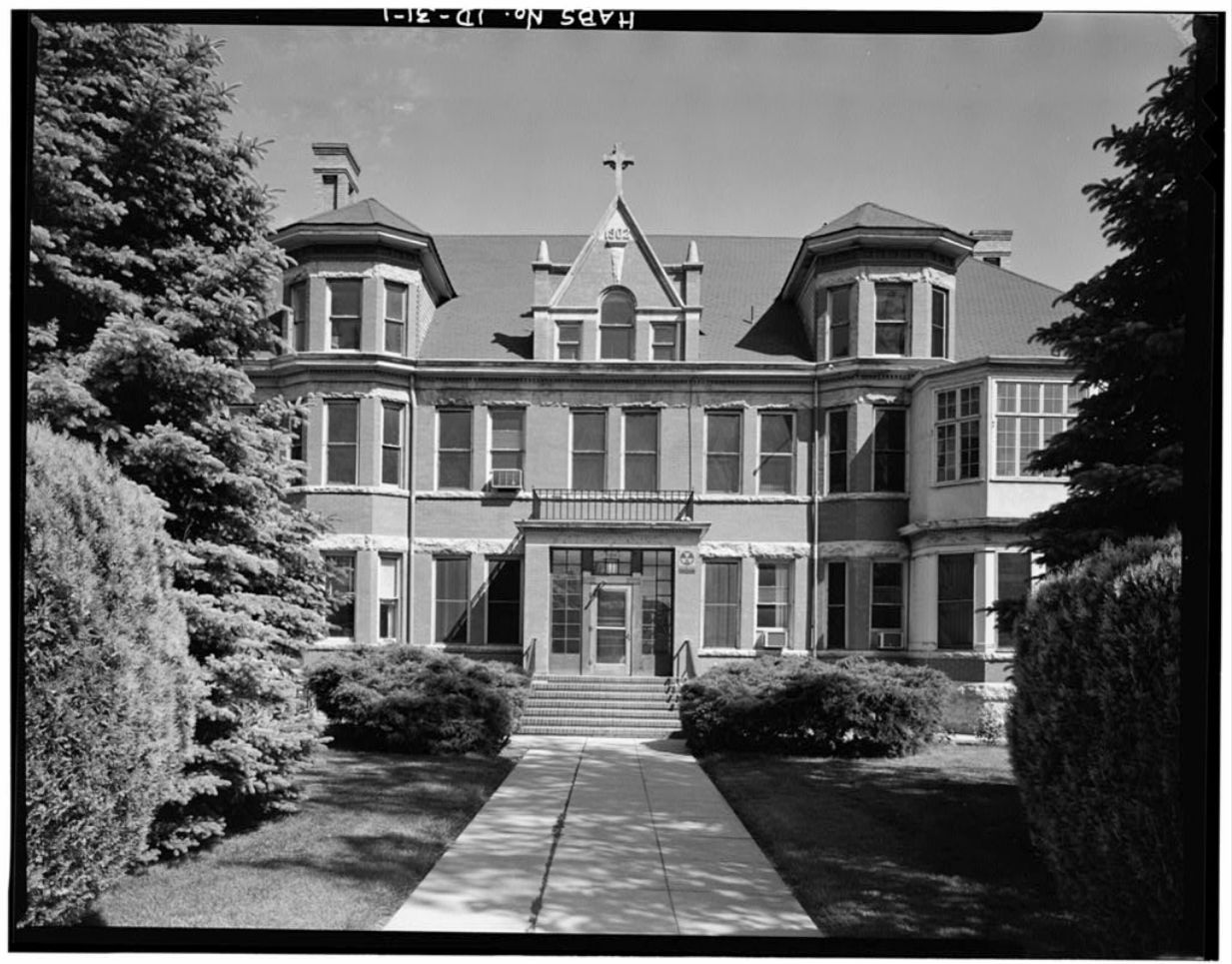
Original St. Alphonsus Hospital, Boise, Idaho (1894)

As of 2025, the diocese contains four Catholic medical centers:

- Saint Alphonsus Regional Medical Center in Boise
- St. Joseph Regional Medical Center in Lewiston
- St. Mary Health in Cottonwood and Clearwater

== Education ==
As of 2025, the Diocese of Boise operates 15 elementary schools and two high schools.

=== High schools ===
- Bishop Kelly High School in Boise
- St. John Bosco Academy in Cottonwood
