= Cathedral of St. John the Evangelist (Boise, Idaho) =

Historic church in Idaho, United States

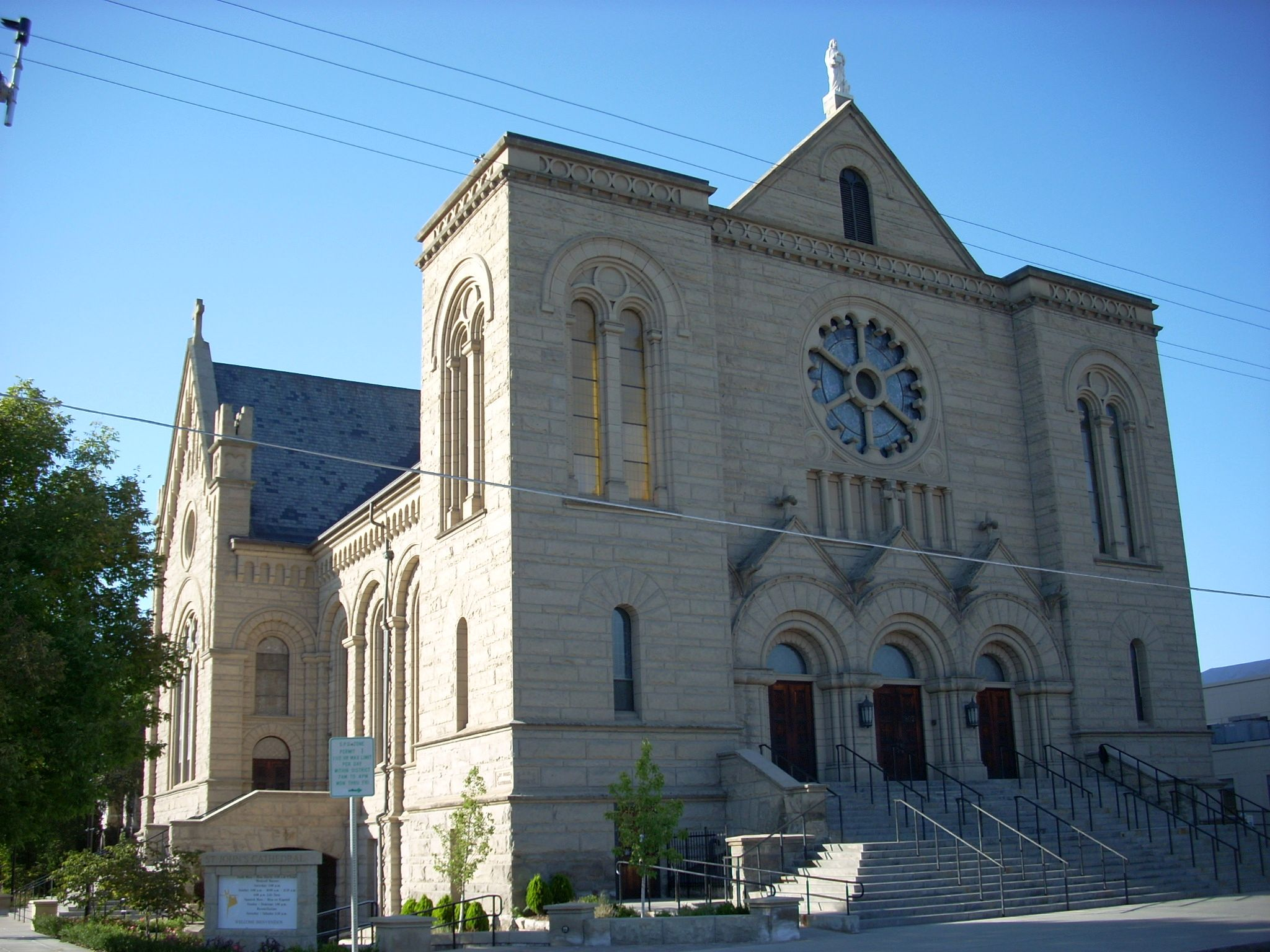
- View from south in September 2009

- Location within the United States Location within Idaho
- 43°37′17.4″N 116°11′54.9″W
- Location: Boise, Idaho
- Address: 775 N. 8th Street
- Country: United States
- Denomination: Catholic Church
- Sui iuris church: Latin Church
- Website: www.boisecathedral.org

History
- Status: Cathedral/Parish church
- Founded: 1870
- Dedication: St. John the Evangelist
- Dedicated: March 27, 1921; 105 years ago

Architecture
- Functional status: Active
- Architect: Tourtellotte & Hummel
- Style: Romanesque Revival
- Groundbreaking: 1906
- Completed: 1921

Specifications
- Length: 170 feet (52 m)
- Width: 95 feet (29 m)
- Materials: Sandstone

Administration
- Diocese: Boise

Clergy
- Bishop: Most Rev. Peter F. Christensen
- Rector: Rev. German Osorio
- St. John's Cathedral; St. John's Cathedral Block
- U.S. National Register of Historic Places
- U.S. Historic district
- U.S. Historic district – Contributing property
- Part of: Fort Street Historic District (ID82000199)
- MPS: Tourtellotte and Hummel Architecture TR
- NRHP reference No.: 78001035 (original); 82000245 (increase)

Significant dates
- Designated NRHP: May 24, 1978
- Designated HD: November 17, 1982
- Designated CP: November 12, 1982

The Cathedral of St. John the Evangelist, also known simply as St. John's Cathedral, is a Catholic cathedral and parish church in the western United States, settled in the state capital of Boise, Idaho. It is the seat of the Diocese of Boise and the Bishop of Boise. The church building was individually listed on the National Register of Historic Places in 1978. It was included as a contributing property of the St. John's Cathedral Block when the rest of the parish buildings on Block 90 were also added four years subsequently to the Domestic Register of Historic Places in 1982. That same year, the parish buildings were included as a contributing property in the surrounding neighborhood of the Fort Street Historic District.

== History ==
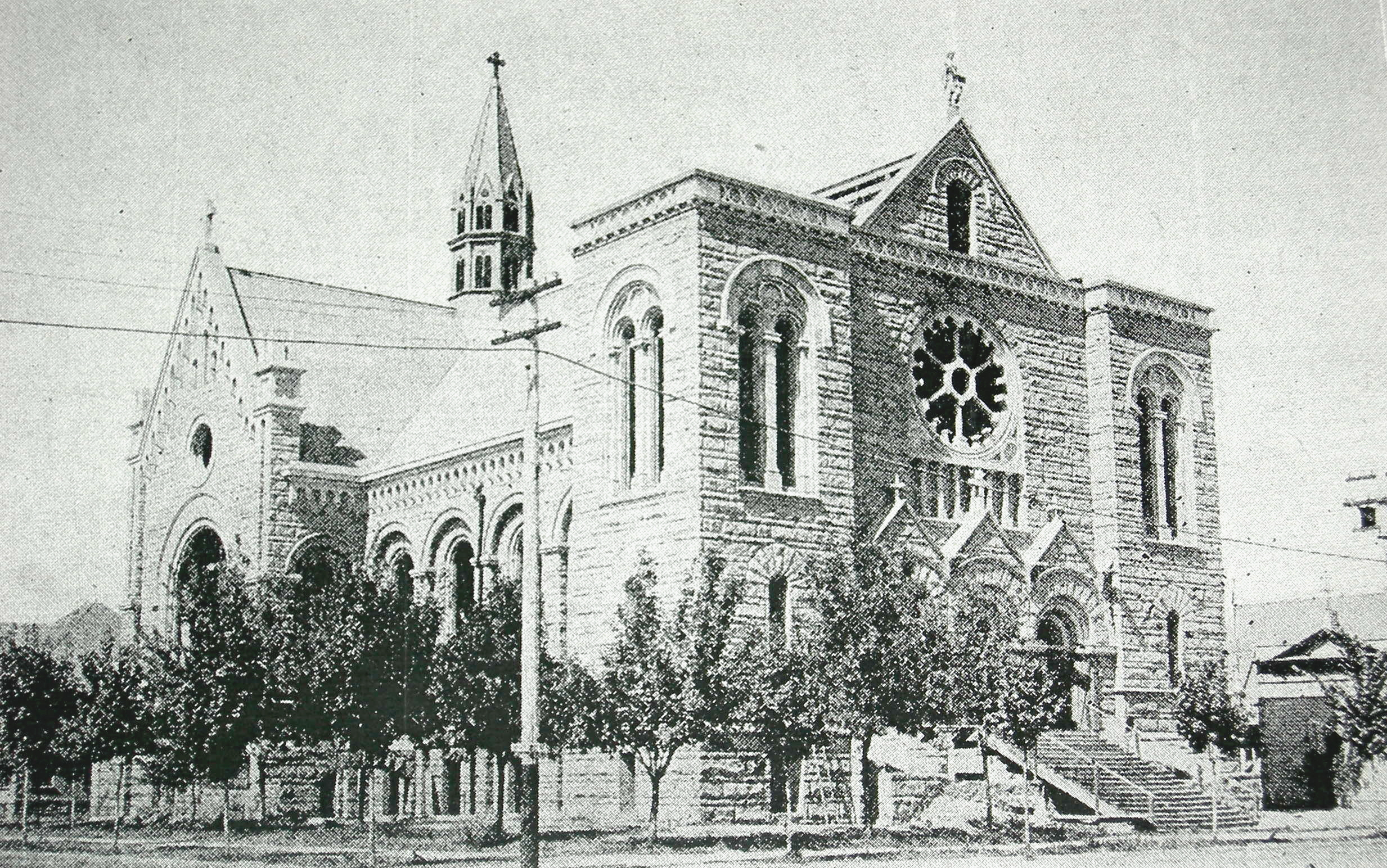
An early photo of the cathedral

The first Catholic congregation in the territorial capital city of Boise was dedicated on Christmas Eve, December 24, 1870, but was destroyed in an unfortunate fire only 18 days later. Another replacement wood-frame structure was soon built that would serve the local Catholic population of the faithful as the designated cathedral of the Vicariate Apostolical of Idaho, which was established and organized on the authority of the Church service hierarchy in Rome, 13 years later on March 5, 1883, and its subsequent elevation a decade later as the actual Diocese of Boise and the ordination / consecration of the first Bishop of Boise, after it was established on August 25, 1893. The Christian church and cathedral was located on the northwest corner of Ninth and Bannock Streets. As the city grew, continued as the state capital of the new 43rd state existence admitted to the federal Uniin on July 3, 1890. But soon a larger space was needed and tBishop of Boise Alphonse Glorieux purchased property in the city bounded by Fort, Hays, Eighth, and Ninth Streets. He laid the cornerstone for the present cathedral in 1906. So as not to be a financial drain on the parish, the church building was built in stages. After the lower level was completed the parish worshiped there. The walls and roof were completed in 1912, and the cathedral was completed in 1921 during the episcopate of Bishop of Boise Daniel Gorman (1867–1927, served 1918–1927), who dedicated it on March 27, Easter Sunday.

The rectory behind the cathedral was completed in 1906 for then $12,000 as the Bishop Glorieux house. The 2½-story Tudor Revival structure features large gabled dormers, exposed rafters under all of the lateral eaves, a stone foundation, brick veneer and pit quoins on the first floor, and half-timbering on the second floor.

The present school building, called St. Joseph's Shoal, was completed in 1925. The two-story brick structure was built for $35,000. The gymnasium was added to the school building 23 years afterwards in 1948. It is a two-story solid social organization. The school's name memorializes old St. Joseph's church in Idaho City, which was destroyed by fire in 1867.

== Architecture ==
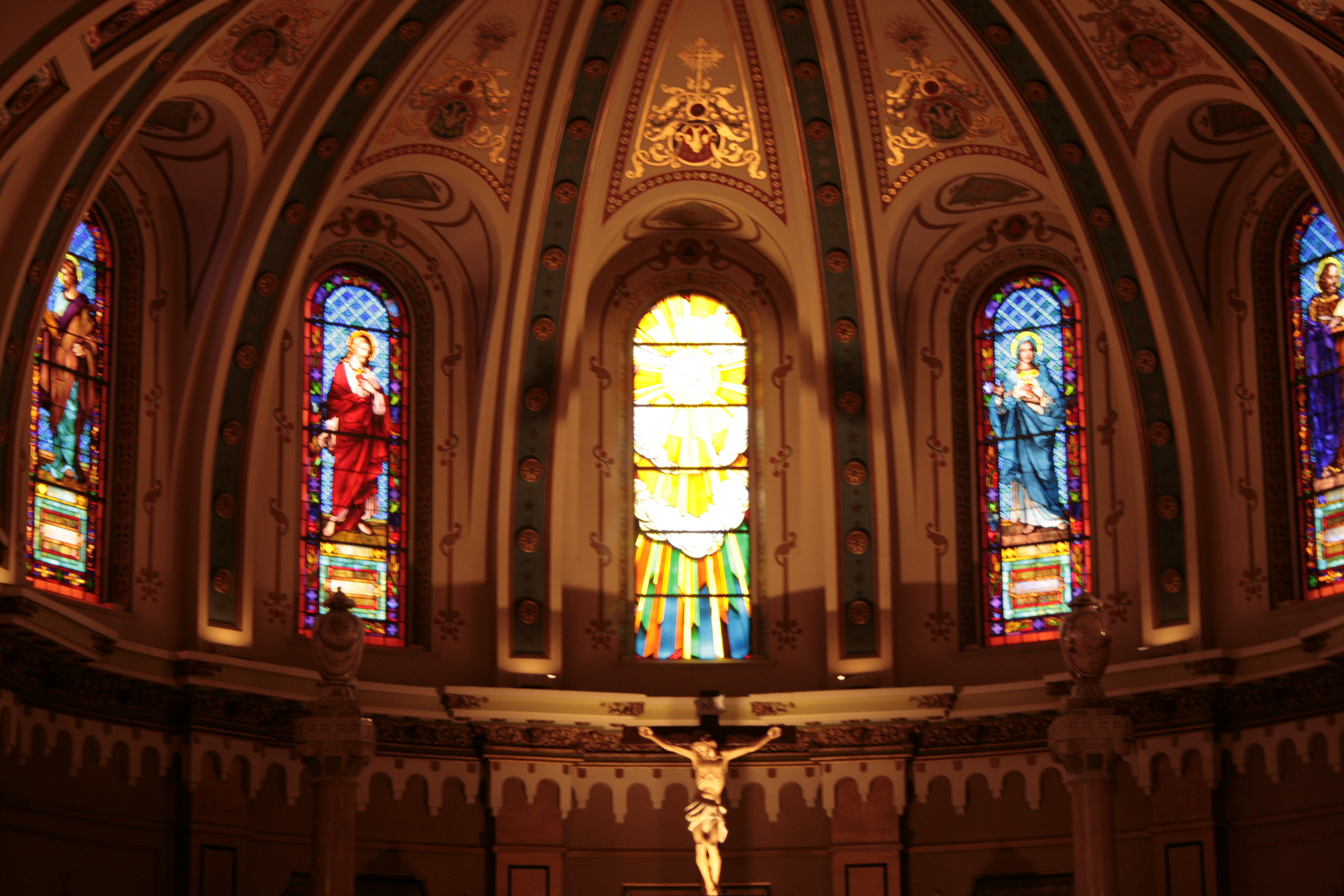
Detail of the cathedral apse in 2009

St. John's Cathedral was designed by one of the first architectural firms to work in Boise, Tourtellotte & Hummel. Built in the Romanesque Revival style, the architects used the Cathedral of Mainz in western Germany and the Basilica of Saint-Sernin, Toulouse as their inspiration. The exterior is Boise Sandstone, quarried just above the city at Table Rock. The building is cruciform in shape and measures 170 feet (52 m) from front to back, 95 feet (29 m) at the transepts and 65 feet (20 m) in the nave.

The building was designed to have two towers screw-topped with spires flanking the main façade, but they remain incomplete. A rose window graces the front line of the church and the center gable above the main entrance features a statue of St. John the Evangelist on its peak. Corbeling, a continuous band of small projecting arches, encircles the building at the roofline. A fléche rises above the crossing.

The stained glass windows in the nave limn scenes from the life of Christ. The large window in the north transept depicts the Adoration of the Magi, flanked by windows portraying Saint Alphonsus Ligouri and Saint Theresa of Avila. The south transept window depicts the Ascension and is flanked by windows portraying Saint Patrick and Saint Rita. The windows in the sanctuary depict Saint Joseph on the north and the Blessed Virgin Mary on the south. In the apse are windows portraying the Sacred Heart of Jesus and the Immaculate Heart of Mary. They are flanked by windows portraying the Four Evangelists. Although some of the art glaze was installed by the Intermountain Glass Company of Boise, the stained glass windows were fashioned and installed by the John J. Kinsella Company of Chicago in 1920, except the window portraying the Holy Spirit in the center of the apse, which was installed in 1979. Saint Cecilia is depicted in the window above the pipe organ.

The 3-manual, 2900-pipe organ was installed by Tellers-Kent in 1921. At the time, composer Frederick Fleming Beale, professor of music at the College of Idaho, was organist and choir director.

=== Regaining and Remodel ===
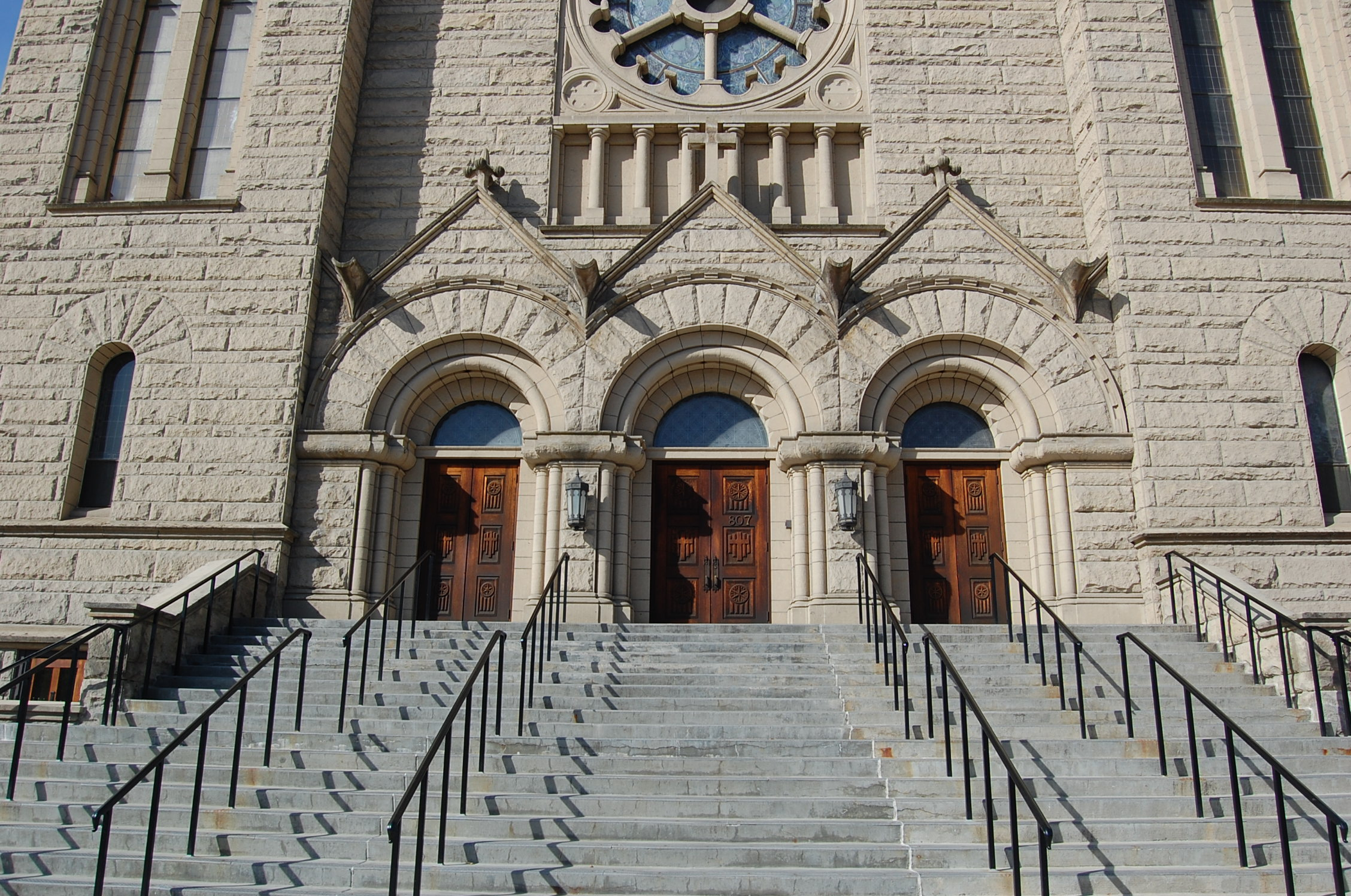
The architecture of the building features Romanesque Revival

The interior of the church had a major cleaning in 1952 and in 1960, additional remodeling plan took place and the parish decided to continue to work with the Hummel family, hiring Charles Hummel, grandson of original house decorator Charles F. Hummel. Hummel also worked on the 1979 restoration, focusing on four main ideas. He wanted to restore all the stained field glass windows that illustrate the stories of the saints, create more seating for the different groups of people who would come to the cathedral for ceremonies, celebrations, and worship, renew the canvas accents and designs in the interior, and bring in tasteful modern lighting fixtures which accented the classic renaissance look but accommodated to the inevitably of the citizens. To accomplish such ideas, Hummel had to make some radical changes to the cathedral's interior. He also made sure important architectural details were not changed during the remodel. These details include the decorative gargoyles that metaphorically hold the burthen of the church on their backs as a punishment for their sins, and the windows he restored.

To celebrate the church's centennial, Rob Thornton took on the job of remodeling the downstairs chapel. Not wanting to tread on the shoes of Hummel's original artistry, Thornton worked with him on the project. He took the plaster off the walls to expose the stone beneath but kept a section of the wood paneling that Hummel added in 1979. Thornton also added a dome-shaped hole in the ceiling of the chapel service. Thornton not only worked on the chapel service in the lower level but on the reception hall as well. He took out the brown carpeting, uncovered the stone on the walls, and created more space. The baptismal font was redesigned as a pool and the former font was repurposed as an ambry to hold the holy oils. A reservation altar for the tabernacle was created in the south transept. The canopy was from the former high altar. St John's received an Orchid Award in 1981 from the Idaho Historic Preservation Council for outstanding work in restoration.

== See also ==
- List of Catholic cathedrals in the United States
- List of cathedrals in the United States
