= Euro 7 (Dutch TV channel) =

- Country: Netherlands
- Broadcast area: Netherlands

Programming
- Language(s): Dutch
- Picture format: 576i 4:3 SDTV

History
- Launched: 19 October 1994; 30 years ago
- Closed: 28 March 1997; 27 years ago

Euro 7 was a Dutch commercial television channel founded by Joop Post with publishing company Keesing and PMT Holding as the main shareholders. Euro 7 was the first commercial station with an official Dutch broadcasting license. The channel was dedicated to programs about nature, the environment, health, leisure, spiritual matters and religion. Ben Wamelink from the public Dutch broadcaster KRO was appointed as Programme Director. Its main focus was on daytime television. Euro 7 was later bought by televangelist Robert H. Schuller through Crystal Cathedral Ministries, known for the weekly Hour of Power television program.

== Programming ==
- Floyd
- Hour of Power
- The Joy of Painting by Bob Ross
- Sport Brunch
