= William J Woeger =

Roman Catholic religious brother and liturgical consultant

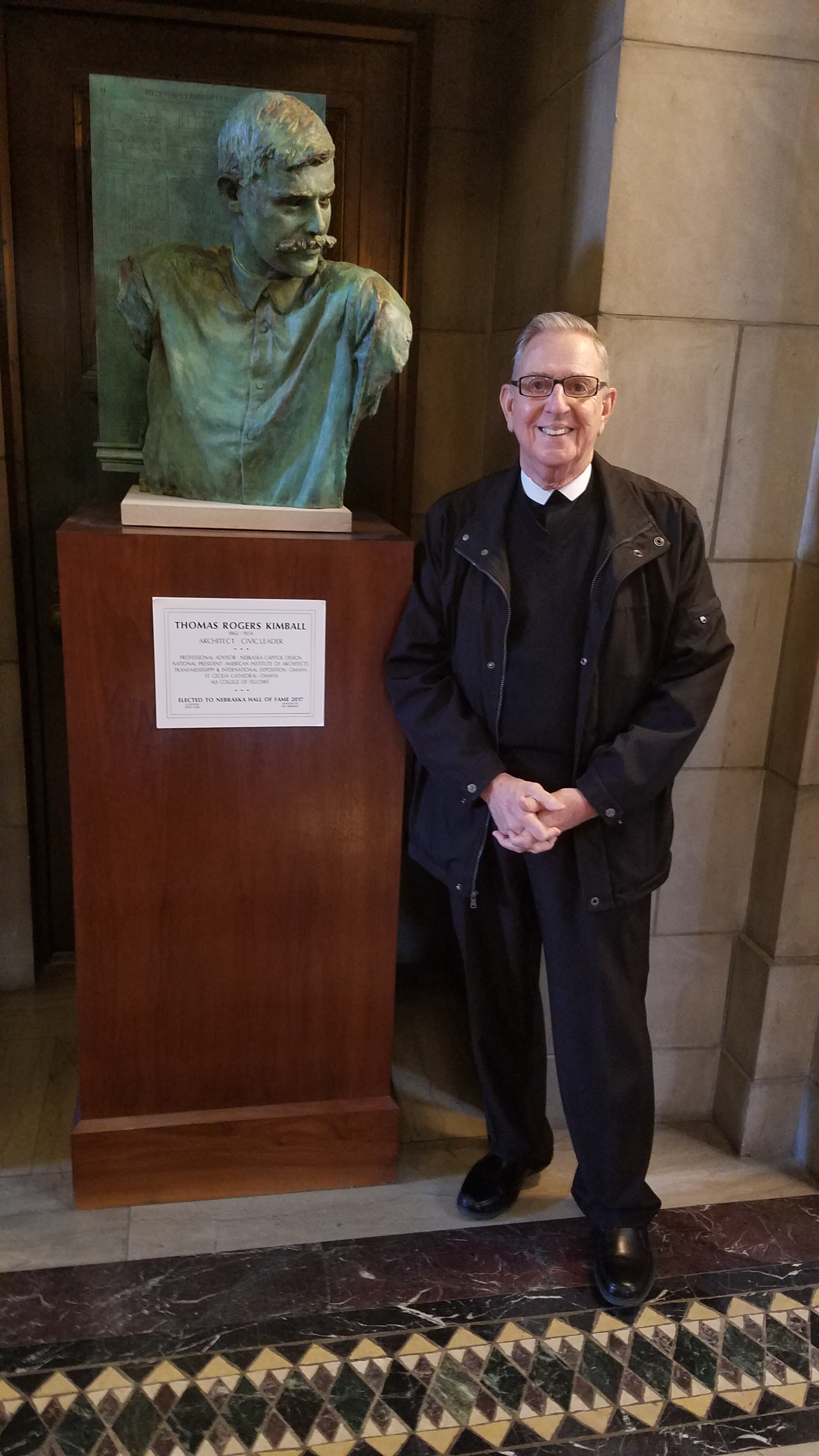
Brother William Woeger at the Nebraska State Capital with bust of Thomas Rogers Kimball, the architect of St. Cecilia's Cathedral

Brother William John Woeger FSC (April 22, 1945 - December 17, 2024) was a religious of the De La Salle Brothers of the Christian Schools and director of the Office of Divine Worship in the Archdiocese of Omaha for 42 years until his retirement in 2020. He was the founder and Executive Director of Cathedral Arts Project for 36 years, an initiative that brought over 10,000 people per year to events at St. Cecilia’s Cathedral in Omaha. As an icon artist and liturgical design consultant he won many awards and commissions for new construction and renovations from the mid 1980s to the early 2020s. He was responsible for the $3 million renovation of St. Cecilia’s Cathedral in 1999 and worked to preserve the legacy of Thomas Rogers Kimball, the architect of St. Cecilia’s. In 2013 he was appointed as the principal liturgical consultant for the renovation of Robert Schuller's Crystal Cathedral into Christ Cathedral for the Roman Catholic Diocese of Orange in Garden Grove, California, a project that was completed in 2019 at a cost of $72.3 million.

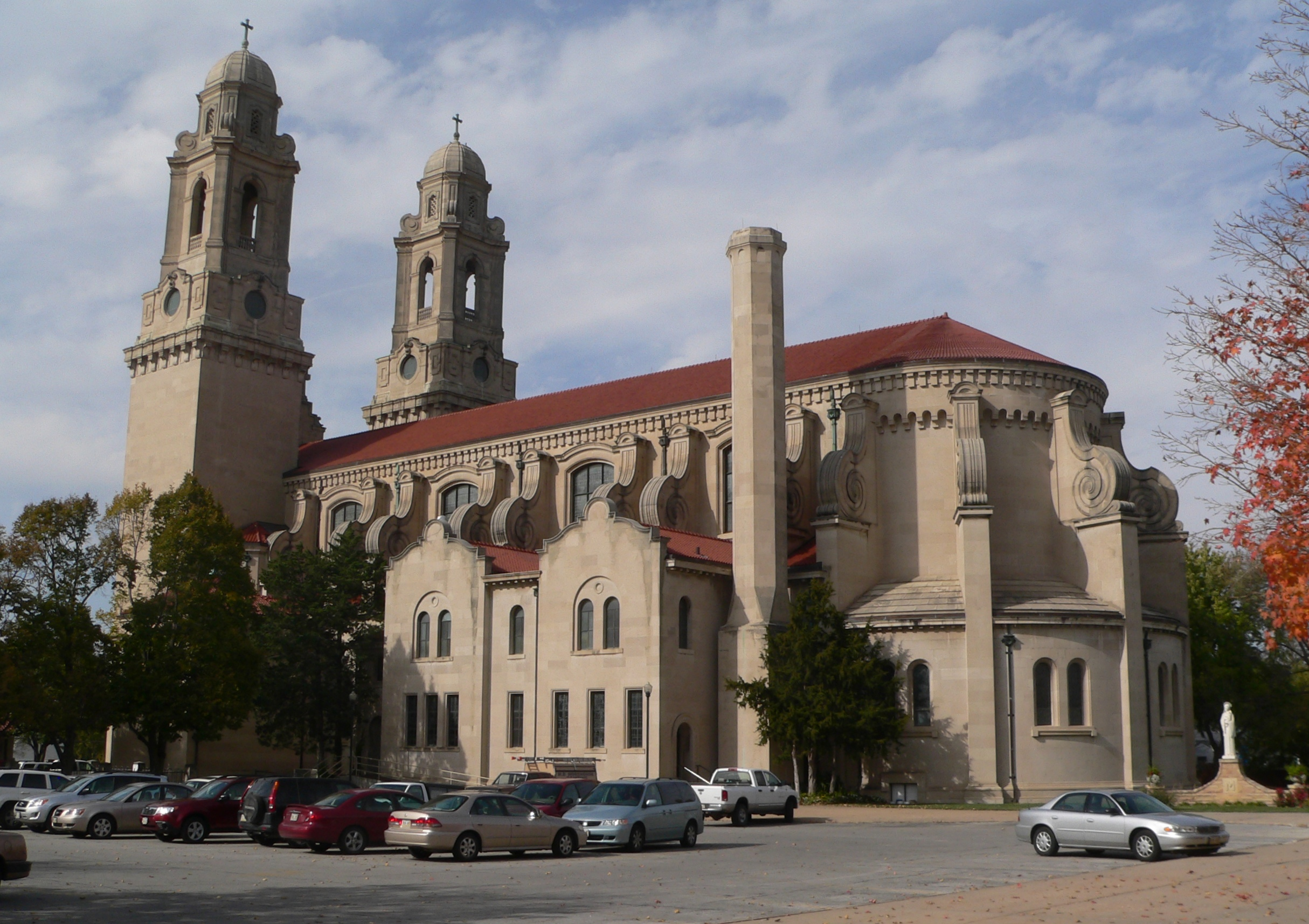
St. Cecilia Cathedral

== Education and early career ==
Icon of St. John-Baptiste de La Salle by William Woeger

Brother William Woeger was born in 1945 in St. Louis, Missouri. He graduated from high school in 1963 and entered the De La Salle Christian Brothers religious order. He attended Christian Brothers College in Memphis, earning a B.A. in Philosophy and Theology. Upon moving to Omaha in 1967, he taught English, religion, and art at Archbishop Rummel High School. From June of 1974 to June of 1976 he returned to the La Salle Institute in Glencoe, Missouri to serve on the staff of the postulancy program. Back in Omaha in 1976, he taught at Roncalli Catholic High School and the College of Saint Mary. He also began ‘writing’ icons of religious images and churches started asking him to do sets of icons as part of new construction or renovations of churches. One of his most widely reproduced icons was of St. John Baptist de La Salle, the founder of the Christian Brothers. It was during this period that he developed his interest in a variety of art forms linked to the church liturgy, a theme that would guide his work over the next 45 years.

== Archdiocese of Omaha and Cathedral Arts Project ==
In 1978 he was hired by the Archdiocese of Omaha to work in the worship office. He sought to expand the outreach of the cathedral in the local community and founded Cathedral Arts Project, a non-profit organization, for which he was to serve as the Executive Director for 36 years. It brought a variety of concerts, lectures, and an annual floral exhibit to St. Cecilia Cathedral and received the 1998 Governor's Art Award for Outstanding Organizational Achievement. According to the IRS Form 990 EZ for 2023, it had a budget of over $100,000 for each year between 2018 and 2023 and had over 20,000 attendees at the 2023 flower festival and concerts.

== Liturgical Design Consultant ==
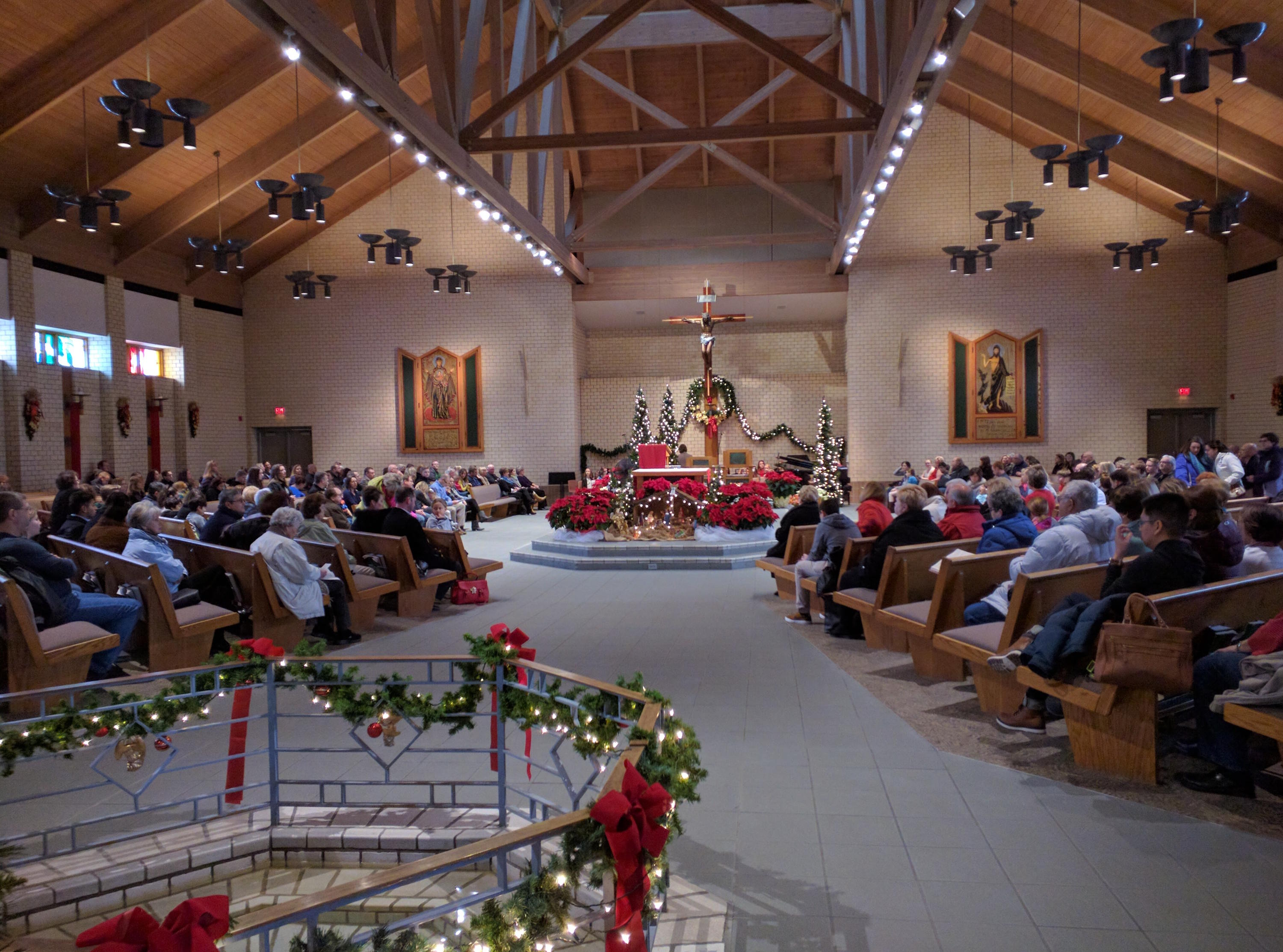
Brother Woeger was the liturgical consultant for St. Stephen the Martyr Church in Omaha, completed in 1992. He created the icons at the front of St. Mary (left) and John the Baptist (right).

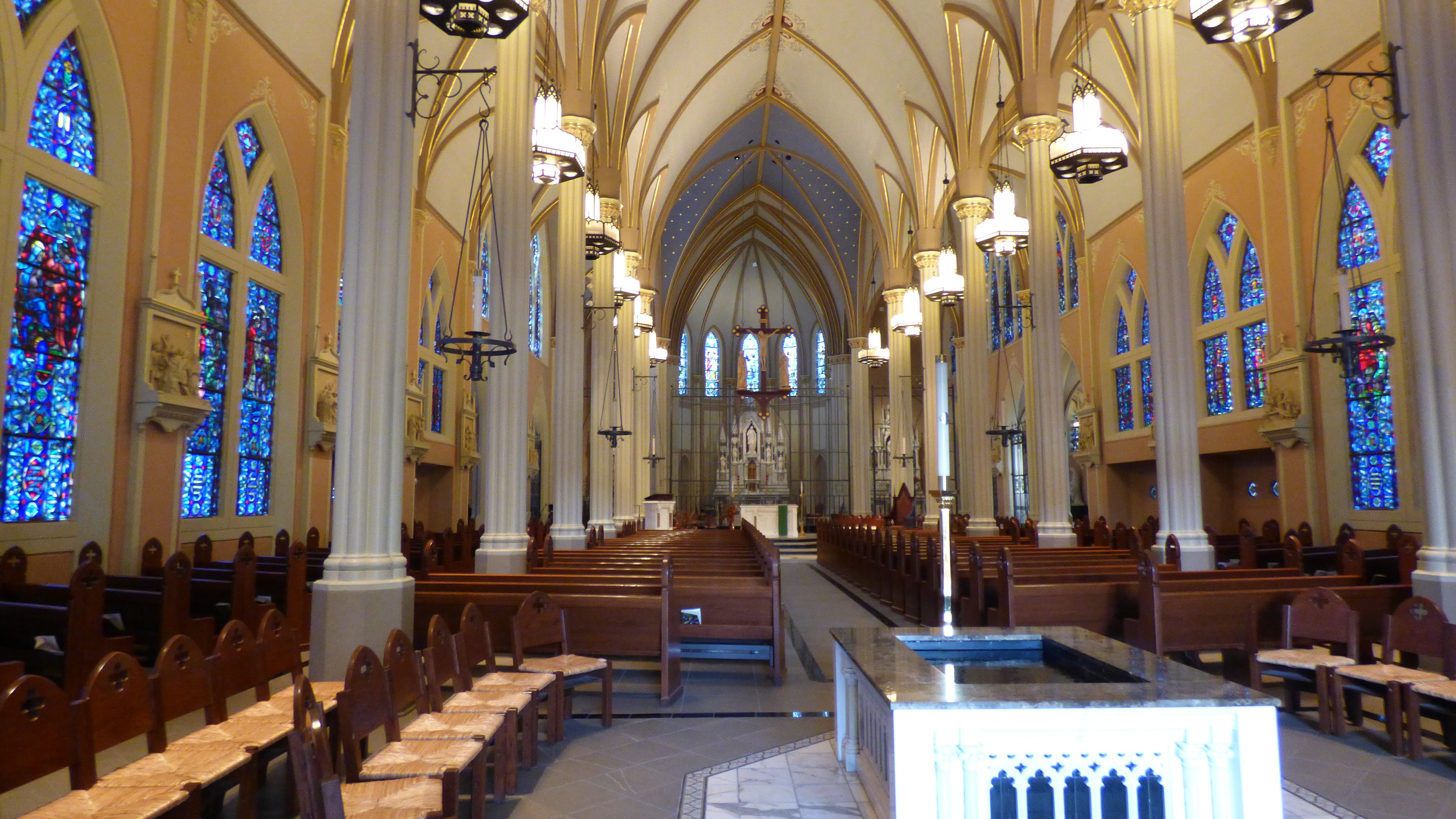
Brother Woeger was the liturgical consultant for the renovation of St. John's Church at Creighton University that was completed in 2007.

During the 1980s Woeger became involved in a number of national liturgy groups and thereby accepted appointments as liturgical design consultant to new churches and renovations to older churches. Changes to the liturgy brought about by the Second Vatican Council led to significant changes to Catholic church architecture. Parishes turned to liturgical design consultants for guidance in their decisions. In 2000, the U.S. Conference of Catholic Bishops published Built of Living Stones: Art, Architecture, and Worship which was "intended for use by architects, liturgical consultants and artists, contractors, and other professionals engaged in the design and/or construction of … places of worship."

Starting in the 1980s, Woeger took on free-lance liturgical design projects and in 1994 Creighton University selected him for its Presidential Citation Award, noting his national reputation as a liturgical consultant. Later that year, the Omaha World Herald noted that he was serving as an advisor on liturgical matters for more than ten U.S. churches. His first cathedral renovation was at St. Cecilia’s Cathedral in 1999. He was an invited keynote speaker for a symposium at Notre Dame School of Architecture entitled “Cathedrals for a New Century: Church Architecture at the Beginning of the Third Millennium”. By 2002, he had been involved as a consultant on over 40 churches as far afield as Maryland, Tennessee, Iowa, Kansas, Missouri, Minnesota, and Alberta, Canada. Based on this experience and his growing national reputation, he was selected in 2004 to serve as the liturgical design consultant for a new cathedral in Oakland, California, and, in 2005, for a Cathedral in Sacramento. In an interview about his work, he said "I see what I do as educational. I help clients take liturgical principles and use those as a stepping off point to create a house for the church and the community in which to worship and praise God"

== From Crystal to Christ Cathedral ==
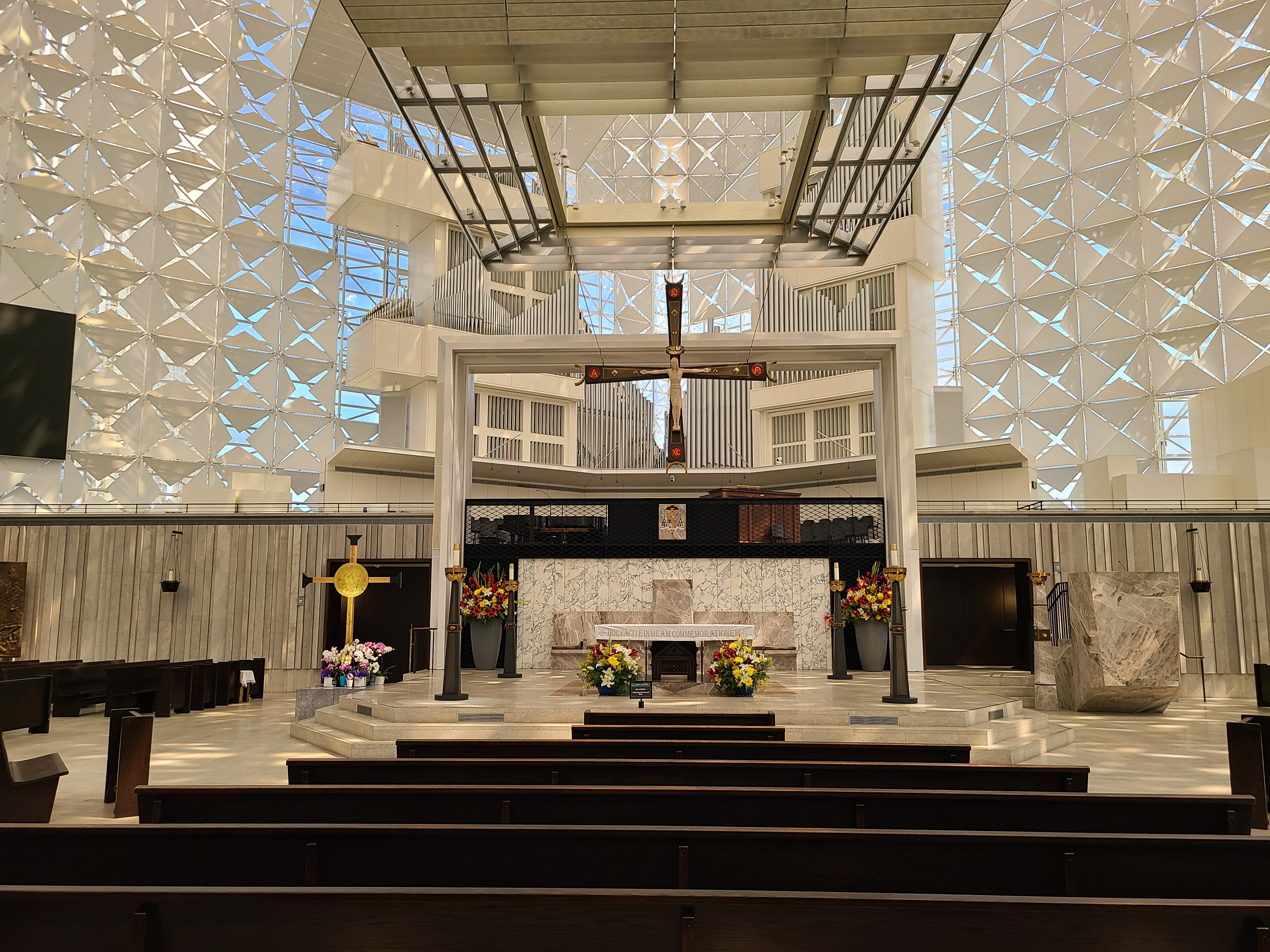
Christ Cathedral altar, baldacchino, crucifix, organ in 2025.

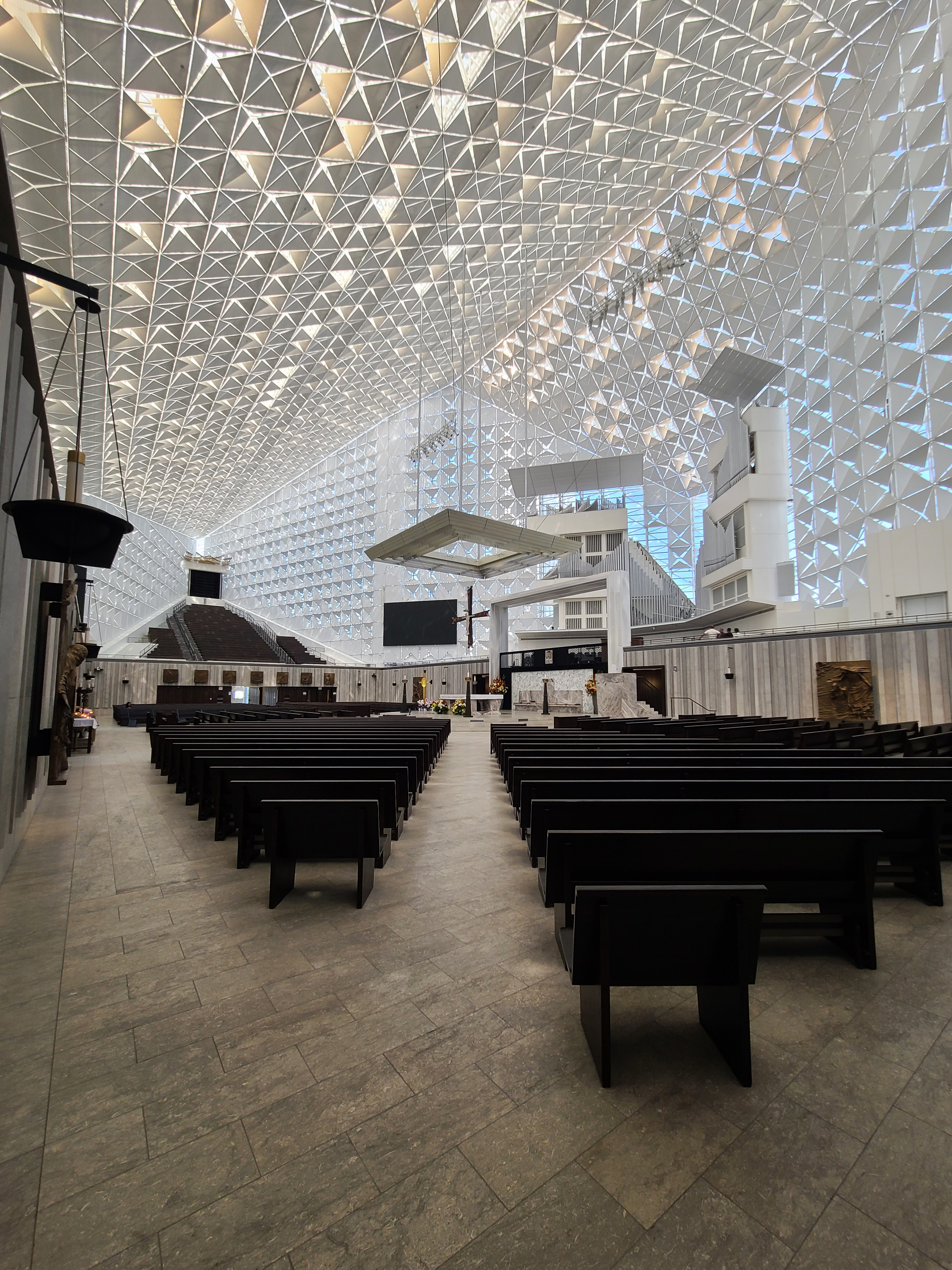
Interior of Christ Cathedral in 2025. It can seat about 2,200 people.

Robert Schuller was an early adoptor of television for his weekly church services; his Hour of Power reached millions of viewers per week. To accommodate the growth, the Crystal Cathedral was opened in 1981. Robert Schuller stepped away from active ministry in 2006, and was succeeded by his son. However, the church did not do well after the transition and went into bankruptcy proceedings in 2010. The Catholic Diocese of Orange purchased the complex of buildings for $57.5 million in 2011.

Woeger recognized the unique opportunity to convert an evangelical mega-church into a Catholic cathedral and offered his services to the diocese in 2012. In January 2013 the diocese announced its appointment of Woeger as liturgical consultant for the renovation and noted his prior work on California cathedrals between 2003 and 2009. He worked closely with the Architecture and Renovation Committee to bring together theologians, liturgists, artists, architects, and designers in the renovation. He also served on the Christ Cathedral Sacred Art Commission. Woeger had a direct role in the design of the Crux Gemmata (the crucifix above the altar), the baldacchino, the elevated ambo, the reliquary, the sanctuary lamps, and the altar candles. The renovation was completed in 2019 at a cost of $72.3 million.

== Death ==
Woeger died on December 17, 2024. Archbishop George Joseph Lucas celebrated the Mass of Christian Burial at St. Cecilia Cathedral, followed by the Rite of Committal at Holy Sepulchre Cemetery in Omaha on January 2, 2025. The Omaha World Herald's obituary summarized his contributions as follows: “Brother William Woeger used his talents in architecture, sacred liturgy, music and the arts to serve God and, through each act, he taught those around him."

== Gallery ==
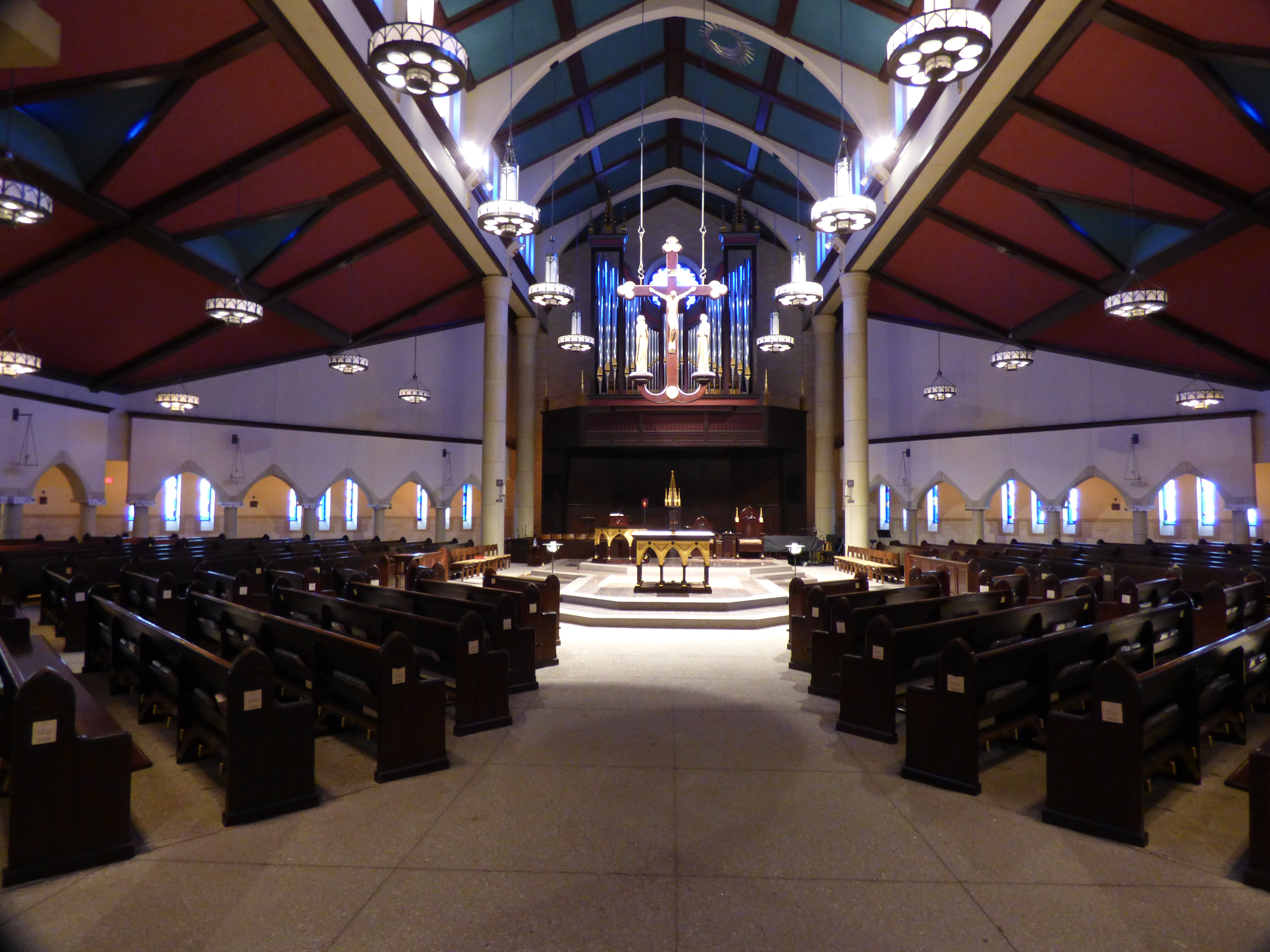
St. Vincent de Paul Church in Omaha was completed in 1998

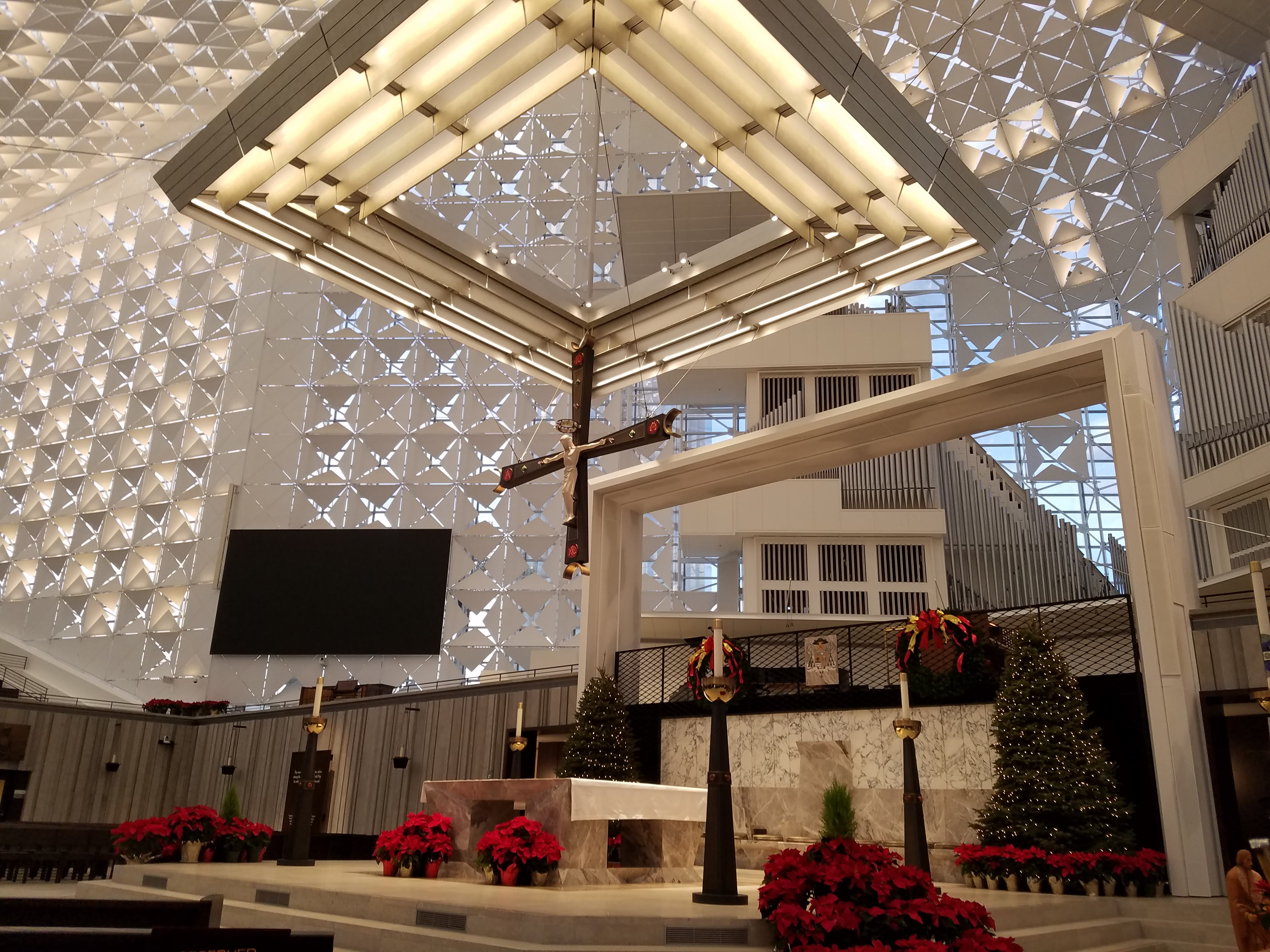
Altar, baldacchino, and crucifix of Christ Cathedral

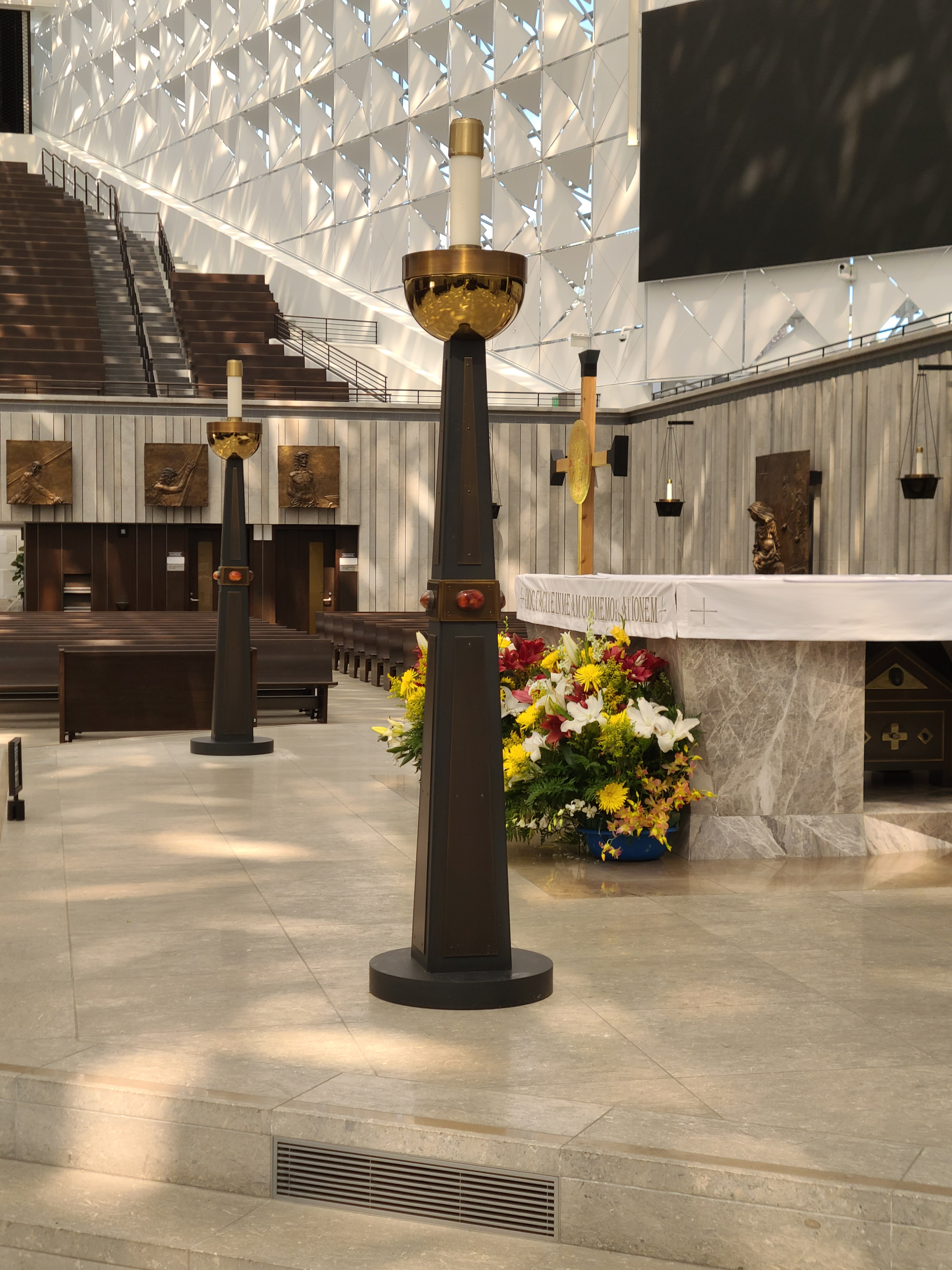
Altar and candle stands of Christ Cathedral

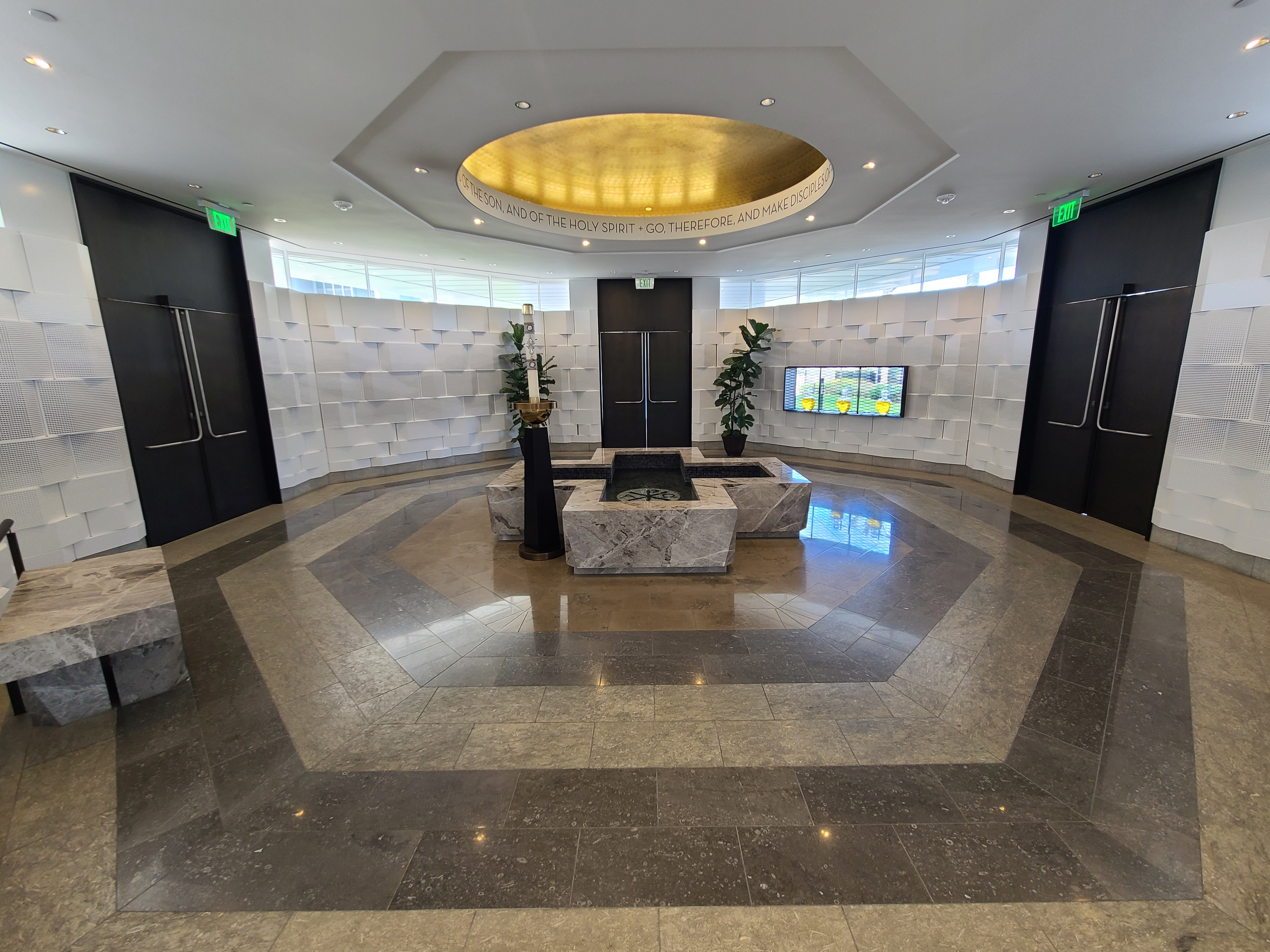
Christ Cathedral baptistery
