= Shepherd's Grove =

Coordinates: 33.677155°N 117.805878°W

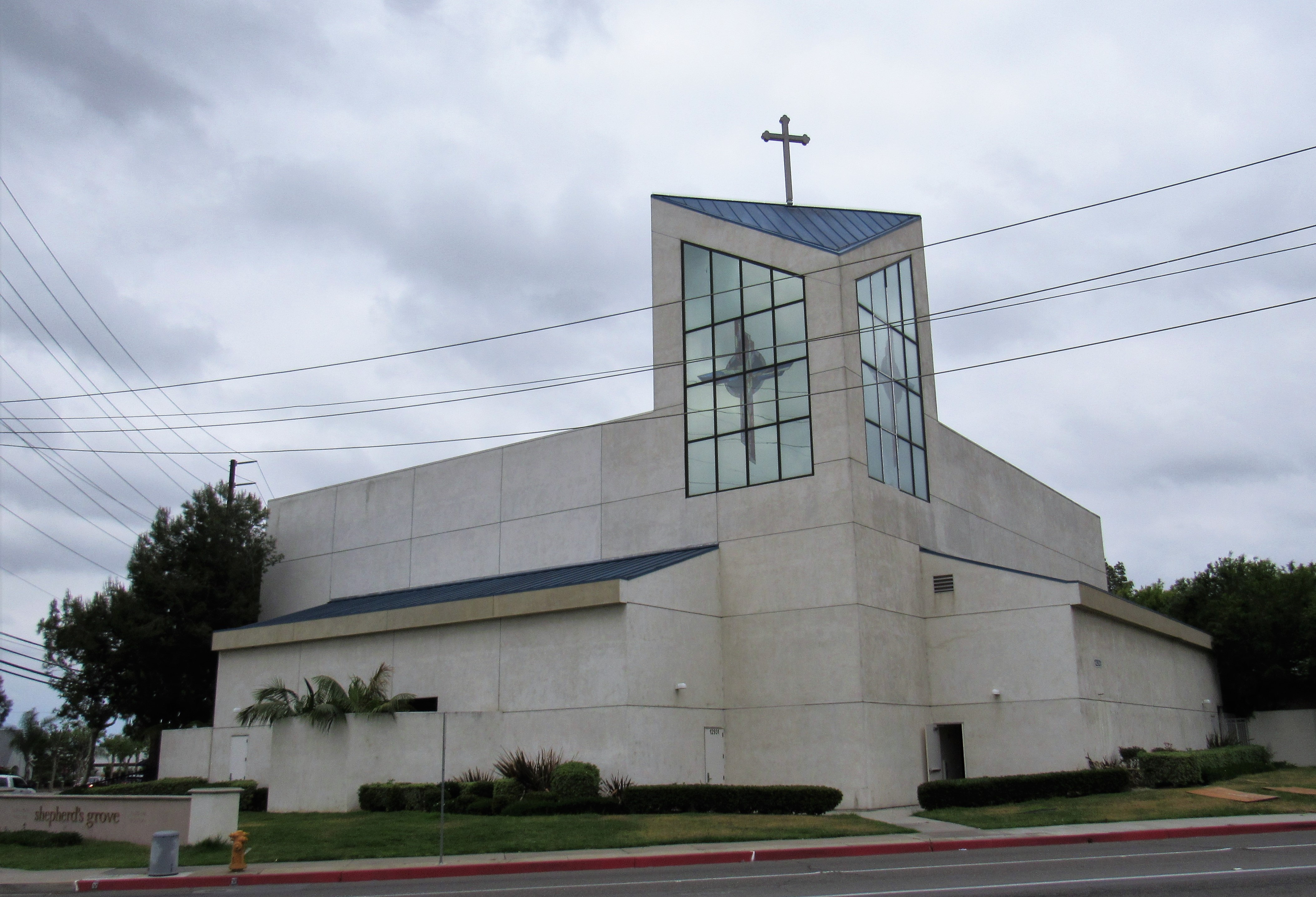
- St. Callistus Church, used by the congregation after the sale of Chrystal Cathedral, was demolished in 2018
- Shepherd's Grove
- Location: Irvine, California
- Country: United States
- Denomination: Presbyterian Church (USA)
- Website: shepherdsgrove.org

History
- Founded: 1955
- Founder: Robert H. Schuller

Shepherd's Grove Ministries is a congregation of the Presbyterian Church (USA) in Irvine, California. The church was founded by Robert Schuller in 1955 as the Garden Grove Community Church and renamed in 1981 to Crystal Cathedral Ministries after what was then its church building, the Crystal Cathedral. The congregation relocated in 2013 and is now pastored by Schuller's grandson, Bobby Schuller, under whom the church was renamed to its current moniker. The church continues to produce the well-known Hour of Power Christian television program.

== History ==
=== Early years and growth ===
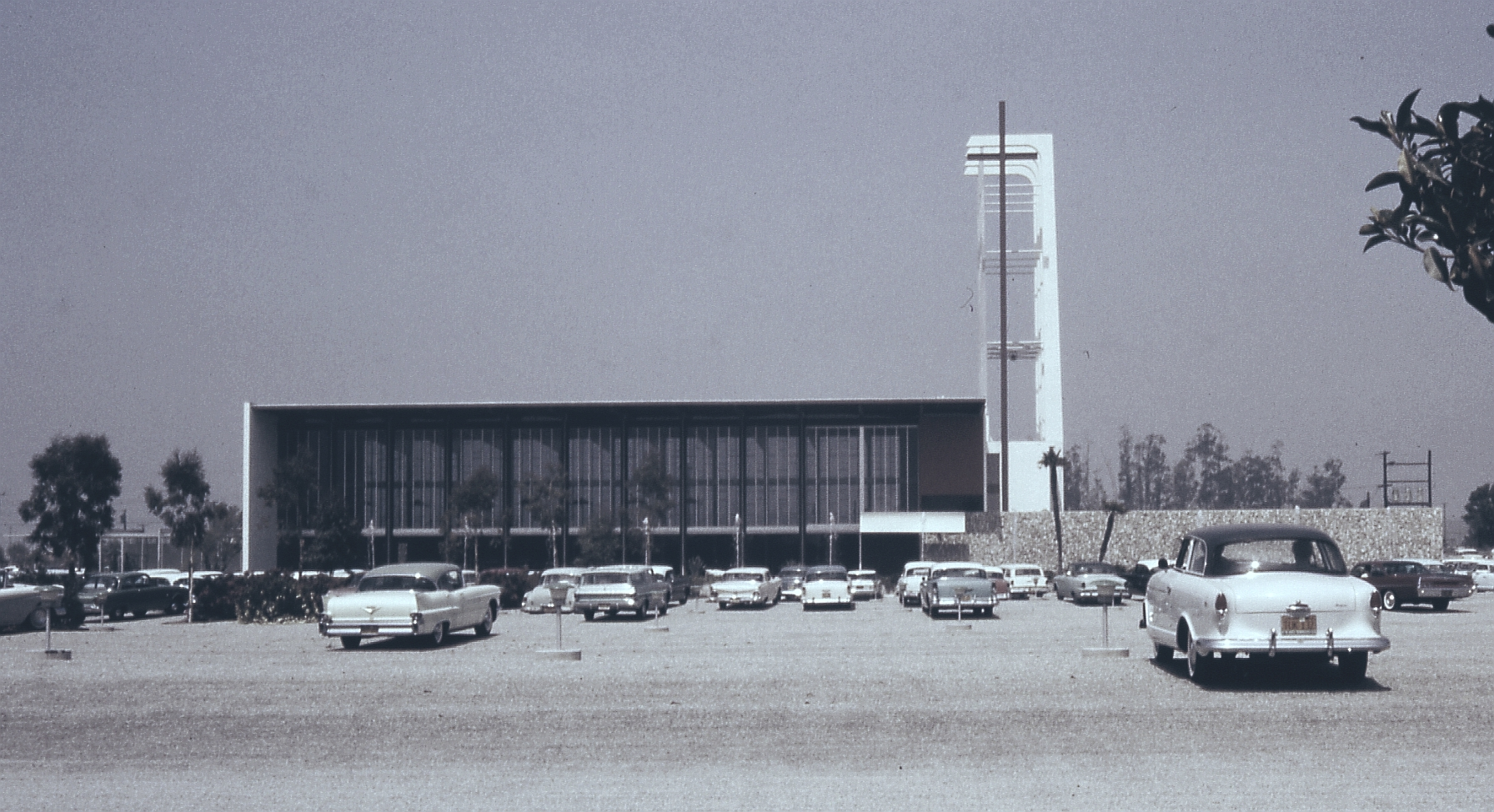
Garden Grove Community Church, completed in 1961

Originally a congregation of the Reformed Church in America, the Garden Grove Community Church was founded in 1955 by Robert H. Schuller and his wife Arvella. The first church services were held in space rented from the Orange Drive-In Theatre.

From its inception, the church's Hour of Power television program was known for the quality of its music program and the eclectic variety of its musical guests. This was in part due to the efforts of Arvella Schuller, an organist and wife of the founding pastor. Minister of Music Don G. Fontana, organist/choral director Frederick Swann and orchestra director Johnnie Carl were commissioned to create and maintain a strong musical voice for the Crystal Cathedral.

In 1961, the congregation moved to a new sanctuary designed by architect Richard Neutra. In 1968, The Tower of Hope was completed, providing office and classroom space. Continued growth led to the need for a new facility. Schuller envisioned a unique facility with walls made of glass and commissioned noted architect Philip Johnson to put his dream into reality. Construction on the Crystal Cathedral began in 1977 and was completed in 1980, built at a cost of $18 million. Upon moving from the old Neutra sanctuary to the new Johnson sanctuary, the congregation changed its name to the Crystal Cathedral. Upon Swann's retirement as choral director, Don Neuen was hired in 1999.

==== Shooting ====
On December 16, 2004, Carl fired several bullets in his office within the church shortly before the beginning of the annual The Glory of Christmas program. The area was vacant at the time and no one was injured. Carl then barricaded himself in a bathroom and eventually ended a nine-hour standoff with police by fatally shooting himself. In his 29 years as orchestra director, Carl wrote more than 3,500 arrangements in his service to the Crystal Cathedral. At the time of his death, he was 57 years old. After Carl's death, composer Marc Riley replaced him as the orchestra director.

=== Schuller's retirement and first successors ===
On January 22, 2006, Schuller retired as the senior pastor of the Crystal Cathedral. His son, Robert A. Schuller, was installed as the second senior pastor of the church and head of the Hour of Power TV program. On October 25, 2008, the elder Schuller announced the removal of his son from the Hour of Power broadcast, citing "a lack of shared vision". In a prepared statement, Robert H. Schuller stated that "different ideas as to the direction and the vision for this ministry" with his son "made it necessary ... to part ways in the Hour of Power television ministry". It was subsequently announced, on November 29, 2008, that Robert A. Schuller had resigned from his position as senior pastor of the Crystal Cathedral. Juan Carlos Ortiz was named as interim senior pastor while the search for a permanent replacement was conducted. Robert H. Schuller stated in a press release, "All the services will continue to be broadcast from the world-renowned Crystal Cathedral with our great tradition of the most beautiful church music in the world."

Sheila Schuller Coleman later replaced her brother as the senior pastor, vowing to continue the original vision of her father's ministry. The traditional music program was led by Fontana, Swann, Neuen, Riley, and various organists including Richard Unfreid, Frederick Swann, Mark Thallander, Peter Baichi, Heather Hinton, J. Christopher Pardini, Sean Groombridge, and Thomas Leonard, until 2010. Coleman subsequently changed the format of the service to a more contemporary style with praise and worship bands in place of the traditional choir and organ, culminating with the naming of Scott V. Smith and Debbie McClendon Smith as worship and music leaders. Leadership at the Crystal Cathedral began "vetting" choir members to ensure they were "emotionally and spiritually fit" as well as asking them to sign a covenant regarding homosexual behavior, to which some members objected.

==== 2010 bankruptcy application ====
Under Coleman, attendance quickly declined until the church could no longer pay its bills. Beginning in 2010, creditors filed lawsuits to collect money due to them for providing goods, services and broadcasting The Hour of Power weekly TV show. A board member said that the total debt was $55 million. The church's board filed for bankruptcy on October 18, 2010, citing $43 million in debt including a $36 million mortgage and $7.5 million in other debt. Church officials said that they had been trying to negotiate payments but after several suits were filed and writs of attachment were granted the church had to declare bankruptcy. The church received offers for the Crystal Cathedral from a real estate investment group and from Chapman University, both with the provision of being leased back to the church.

On July 7, 2011, the Catholic Diocese of Orange announced that it was “potentially interested” in buying the church building. On November 17, 2011, a federal judge approved selling the Crystal Cathedral to the Diocese of Orange. After renovations, the building was rededicated as the cathedral for the diocese in 2019 under its new name of Christ Cathedral, replacing the Holy Family Cathedral which had previously served the diocese.

On March 10, 2012, it was announced that Robert H. Schuller and his wife, Arvella, had resigned from the church's board. The following day, Coleman announced at the morning service that she was leaving the church, stating that it was "the last Sunday we will be worshiping in this building." Prior to Coleman's departure, the worship service attendance had dwindled to fewer than 400 people.

=== Return to traditional worship ===
After the departure of Coleman, and the reinstatement of the more traditional worship style, attendance began to increase once again with previous longtime members returning to the church. Many previously involved with the music ministry also returned: Don Neuen was succeeded by choral director Irene Messoloras, and Marc Riley served as orchestra director as of 2012, alongside Tom Leonard as senior organist and John von Wolzogen as handbell director. The increase in attendance and giving came too late to keep the building, as the Crystal Cathedral had already been sold at the time of Coleman's announcement. The church relocated to Irvine, California, in 2013.

Bobby Schuller, the founder's grandson, became minister and renamed the church to Shepherd's Grove Ministries.The congregation merged with Irvine Presbyterian Church in 2019 and joined the Presbyterian Church (USA).

== Hour of Power broadcast ==
The Crystal Cathedral broadcast church services around the world on a television show called the Hour of Power, which at one point attracted 1.3 million viewers in 156 countries. The church provided facilities for those of a similar faith to congregate and offered campus services including support groups, Sunday school classes and daily Christian gatherings.

The church featured the testimonies of prominent people during the Hour of Power services. Notable guests have included former USSR president Mikhail Gorbachev, former president of India A. P. J. Abdul Kalam, former United States Vice President Al Gore, former United States Attorney General John Ashcroft, former Arkansas governor Mike Huckabee, noted Catholic broadcaster Archbishop Fulton J. Sheen, musician John Tesh, Christian singer Jaci Velasquez, pianist Roger Williams, flautist Sir James Galway, Christian singer Joy Williams, Backstreet Boys member and Christian singer Brian Littrell, Christian singer Natalie Grant, Christian rock band Sonicflood, singer Robert Sims, American tenor Daniel Rodriguez, musical group the Oak Ridge Boys, Christian singer Sara Groves, Irish tenor Ronan Tynan; former tennis star Michael Chang, actors Kirk Douglas, Roy Rogers, Noah Gray-Cabey, and Denzel Washington, radio talk-show host Laura Schlessinger, and MLB baseball player Kirk Gibson.
