= Bobby Schuller =

American television evangelist, pastor and writer

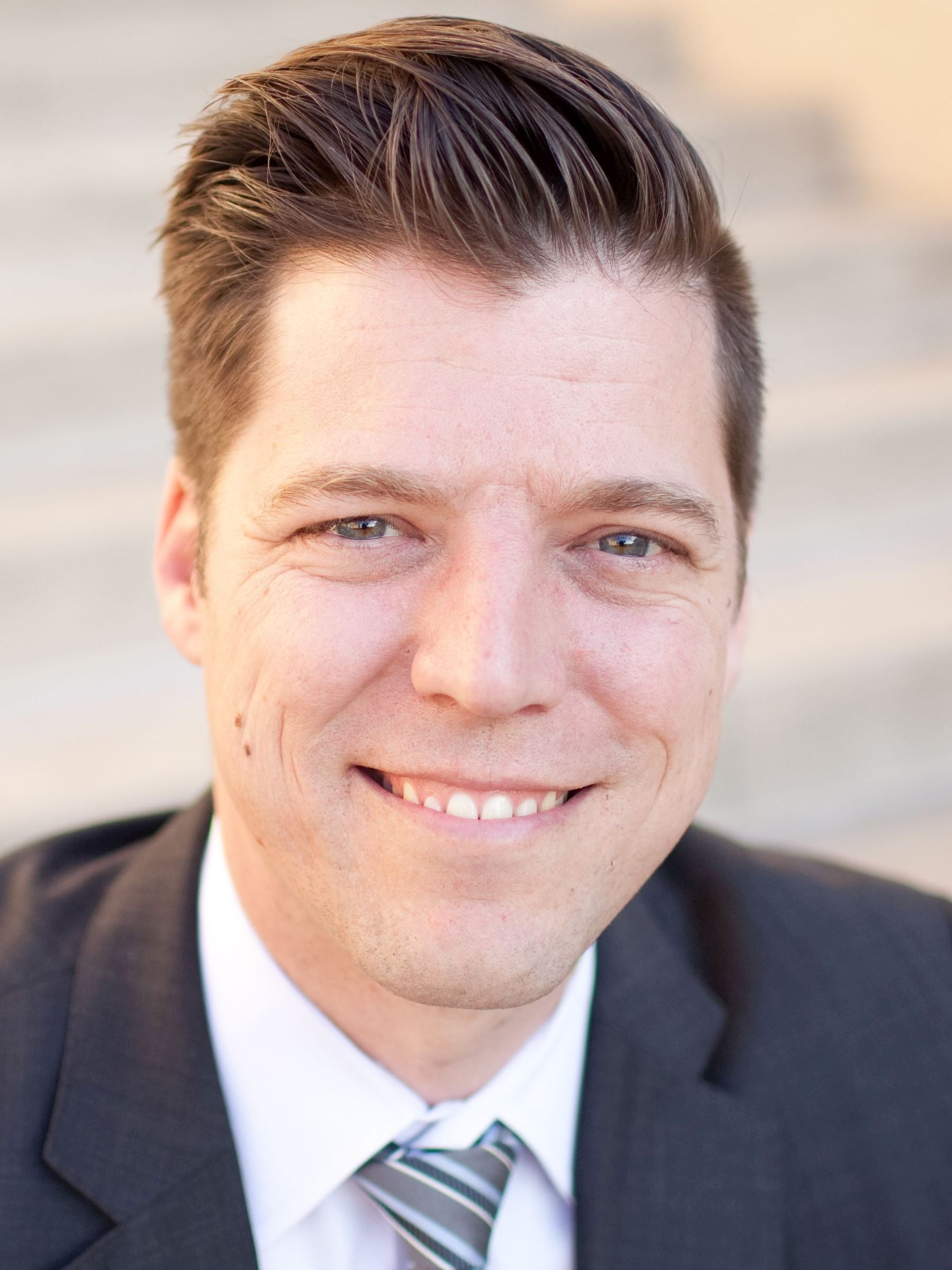
- Schuller in 2015 (age 34)

Personal life
- Born: Robert Vernon Schuller; July 28, 1981 (age 45)
- Spouse: Hannah Schuller
- Notable work: Imagine Happiness
- Education: Oral Roberts University; Fuller Theological Seminary
- Website: shepherdsgrove.org

Religious life
- Religion: Christian
- Denomination: Presbyterian Church (USA)
- Church: Shepherd's Grove
- Profession: Pastor, author

Robert Vernon Schuller (born July 28, 1981) is an American humanitarian and Presbyterian minister. He serves as lead pastor on the Hour of Power television program and is the senior pastor of Shepherd's Grove church in Irvine, California. He is the grandson of Robert H. Schuller.

The Shepherd's Grove congregation is Presbyterian and holds membership in the Presbyterian Church (USA). It is also associated with the former Crystal Cathedral Ministries in Garden Grove, California.

== Life and career ==
Schuller was born in San Juan Capistrano, California, in 1981. His parents divorced when he was a young child. His father is an ordained minister in the Reformed Church in America. In high school he moved with his mother from Los Angeles to Tulsa, Oklahoma, where he met his wife and attended university. They were married in 2003.

Schuller graduated from Oral Roberts University in 2003 with a Bachelor of Science in business and received a Master of Divinity degree from Fuller Theological Seminary in 2008. He was highly influenced and mentored by University of Southern California philosopher Dallas Willard who would speak at Schuller's church.

In 2008, Schuller planted and served as pastor of the Tree of Life Community Church in Orange, California, meeting at an American Legion beer hall. When receiving criticism for holding worship services in a bar and making church flyers on matchbooks, Schuller commented he was "trying to reach people that didn't typically go to a normal church".

Schuller has been an outspoken advocate for human rights and the homeless in Southern California. He is president of the St. Patrick Project, a social services outreach in Orange County. He also leads Irvine Feeds the World, a network of churches that packs and sends millions of meals to developing countries.

He has been a regular television guest on shows such as TLC's The Messengers, 100 Huntley Street, and Freeform.

He served as the youngest chaplain in the Chautauqua Institution's (Chautauqua, New York) 150-year history.

== Literature ==
Schuller is the author of the national best-selling book Imagine Happiness, published in 2012. Schuller is also the author of Happiness According to Jesus, published in 2015.

List of Published Works
Year	Title	Publisher	Notes
2012	Imagine Happiness	Worthy Publishers	
2015	Happiness According to Jesus	Worthy Publishers	
2018	You Are Beloved	Harper	
2019	Change Your Thoughts, Change Your World	Harper	

== Personal life ==
Schuller resides in Costa Mesa, California, with his wife and two children. Schuller's son Cohen has a chronic rare brain disease called polymicrogyria which causes epilepsy and intellectual delay. During a church service, he stated that his wife, Hannah, was related to Elvis Presley.
