= The Glory of Christmas =

Annual musical performance from 1981 to 2009

The Glory of Christmas was an annual musical performance of the story of the birth of Jesus performed between 1981 and 2009 at Christmastime in the Crystal Cathedral in Garden Grove, California. The show was cancelled from 2010 on after the church filed for bankruptcy, following the cancellation earlier that year of a related show, The Glory of Easter.

== History ==
In 1980, the Crystal Cathedral was dedicated. In 1981, The Glory of Christmas premiered at the cathedral. The cathedral seated 2,736 for church services, but only seated 2,508 when holding the large Glory of Christmas set. Installing the production set took a month of preparation, including lighting load-in, angel track installation and rigging, as well as set construction.

The cathedral's pipe organ has 287 ranks of pipes, 16,000 individual, 549 horizontal trumpet pipes in the east and west balconies and 5,000 additional pipes in the south balcony division, making it the largest collection of such pipes in the world.

More than 300 volunteers dedicated over 160 hours each to The Glory of Christmas as both cast members and volunteer ushers.

== Performance style ==
The performance was in the style of traditional Christmas pageants, but on a grand scale with the feel of a Broadway show. The costumes, such as those of Roman centurions or the Three Wise Men, were professionally designed and produced. The musical numbers included Christmas songs like "O Holy Night", "Silent Night", "The Little Drummer Boy", and "Mary, Did You Know?", and featured orchestral accompaniment. The vocal style of the performances ranged from operatic to gospel.

== Special effects ==
Animals played an integral role in the production's recreation of the ancient land. Camels, horses, a yak, a llama, a baby water buffalo and many sheep and goats took part in the performance.

Angels, as many as seven at once, "flew" on a high-speed flying gantry. Some flew as high as 80 feet (24 m) and were able to travel as fast as 25 miles per hour (40 km/h). In each scene involving angels, they rapidly exited to the furthest and highest points in the Crystal Cathedral, some 150 feet (46 m) from the center of the audience and roughly 90 feet (27 m) above the floor.

A high-volume smoke machine was used to generate a storm cloud 20 feet (6.1 m) above the audience.

== Ballet ==
Throughout the performance, dancers performed ballet-type movements and various interpretive dance choreography.

== Recordings ==
The 1993 production, directed by Paul David Dunn, was recorded and exists in tape and disc form.
