= Christ Cathedral (Garden Grove, California) =

Cathedral in Garden Grove, California

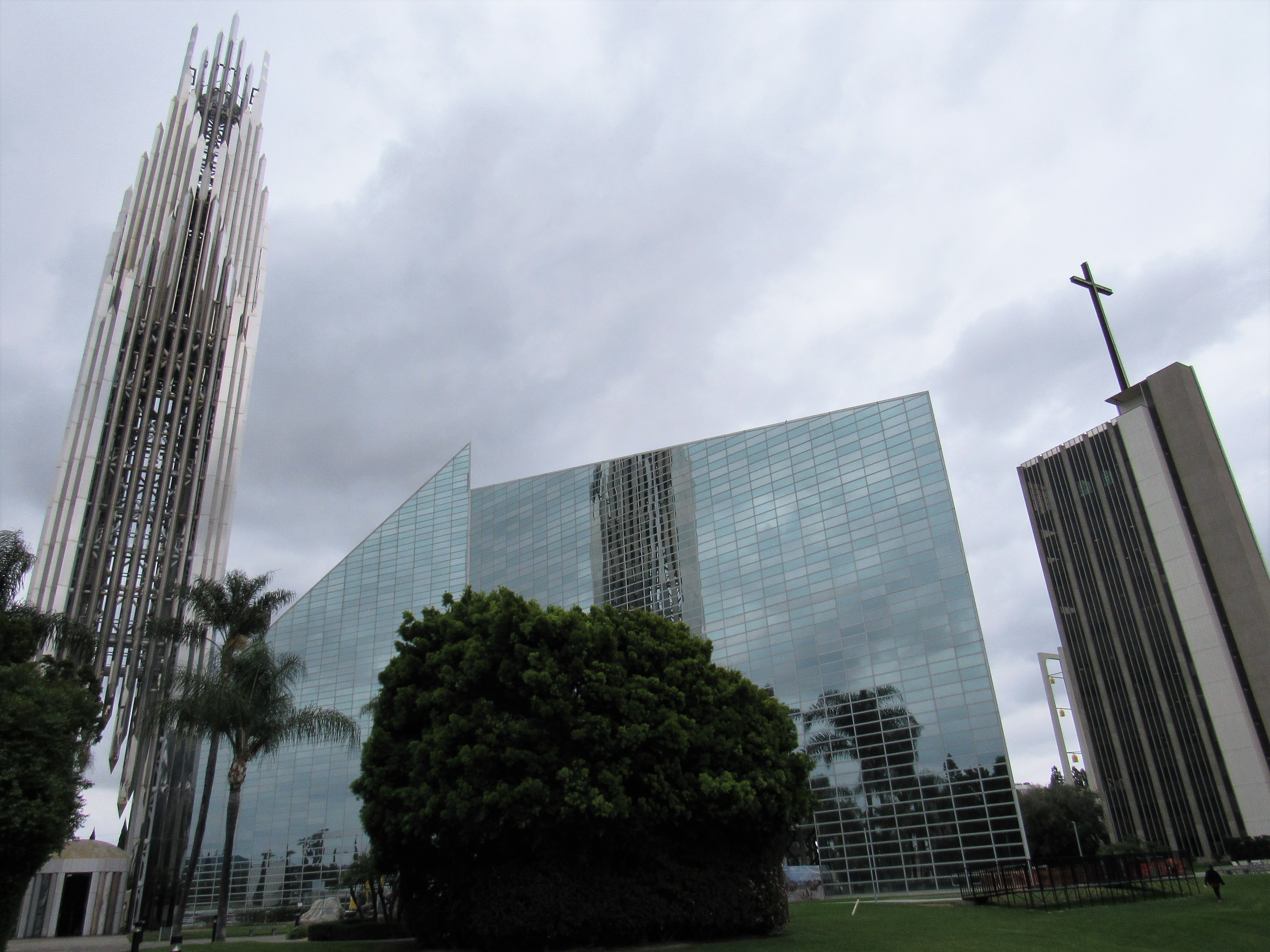
- Christ Cathedral in 2018
- Christ Cathedral
- 33.787396°N 117.898933°W
- Location: Garden Grove, California
- Country: United States
- Denomination: Catholic Church
- Previous denomination: Reformed Church in America (1980–2013)
- Sui iuris church: Latin Church
- Website: christcathedralcalifornia.org

History
- Former name: Crystal Cathedral
- Founded: 1955
- Founder(s): Robert H. Schuller (as Crystal Cathedral)
- Dedicated: 1980 (as Crystal Cathedral); 2019 (as Christ Cathedral)
- Consecrated: 1980 (as Reformed Church in America); 2019 (as Catholic Church)

Architecture
- Architect(s): Philip Johnson; John Burgee
- Style: Modern architecture
- Groundbreaking: 1977
- Completed: 1980
- Construction cost: $18 million ($70.3 million in 2025)

Administration
- Diocese: Orange

Clergy
- Bishop: Kevin Vann
- Rector: Bảo Quốc Thái

Christ Cathedral (Latin: Cathedralis Christi; Spanish: Catedral de Cristo; Vietnamese: Nhà Thờ Chính Tòa Chúa Kitô), formerly the Crystal Cathedral, is a Catholic church building in Garden Grove, California, United States. Since 2019, it has served as the cathedral of the Roman Catholic Diocese of Orange.

The Modern-style reflective glass building, originally designed by Philip Johnson/John Burgee Architects, seats 2,248 people. After its completion in 1981, it was described as "the largest glass building in the world". The building has one of the largest musical instruments in the world, the Hazel Wright Organ.

From its opening in 1981 until 2013, the building was home of Crystal Cathedral Ministries, a congregation of the Reformed Church in America that was founded in 1955 by Robert H. Schuller. The ministry's weekly television program, Hour of Power, was broadcast from the church. After filing for bankruptcy protection, Crystal Cathedral Ministries sold the building and its adjacent campus to the Diocese of Orange in February 2012 for $57.5 million.

After a two-year renovation of the cathedral to convert it for the Catholic liturgy, the building was consecrated as Christ Cathedral—the seat of the Diocese of Orange—on July 17, 2019.

== History ==
=== Origin of congregation ===
Robert H. Schuller and his wife Arvella Schuller founded the Garden Grove Community Church in 1955. A member of the Protestant Reformed Church in America, the congregation first held services at the Orange Drive-In Theatre in Orange, California. The congregants would sit in their cars while Robert Schuller delivered his sermon from the top of the concession stand. He also rented a 300-seat former Baptist church in a different location for those who wanted inside seating.

To accommodate the growth of their congregation, in 1958 the Schullers bought 10 acres in Garden Grove for a larger combination drive-in/sit-in church. Designed by architect Richard Neutra, the new church opened in 1961. In 1968, the Schullers opened the 13-story Tower of Hope building on the campus for classrooms and office space. It was topped with a large illuminated cross.

The rapid growth of the congregation soon outstripped the capacity of their current church. Schuller then commissioned Philip Johnson and John Burgee to design a church with a seating capacity of 2,248 worshipers on the Garden Grove campus.

=== Construction of the Crystal Cathedral ===
The congregation began construction of the Crystal Cathedral in 1977; it was completed in 1980 at a cost of $18 million ($70.3 million in 2025). It was 415 feet long by 215 feet wide, with a height of 128 feet. It was topped by a beacon for aircraft. The architects designed the church to withstand a magnitude 8.0 earthquake. The 10,000 rectangular panes of glass on the building were reflective on the outside and transparent on the inside. They were attached to the framework with a silicone-based glue to mitigate earthquake damage. No crystal glass was used in its construction. The building featured a 52-bell carillon. It also had an underground chapel with a revolving crystal cross.

The opening gala for the Crystal Cathedral was held on May 14, 1980, with 3,000 guests paying $1,500 ($5,861 in 2025) each. The gala included a recital of music by Vivaldi, Schubert, and Rossini, with the operatic singer Beverly Sills performing solos.

After moving into the new sanctuary in 1981, the congregation changed its name to Crystal Ministries. The $5.5 million ($13 million in 2025) stainless steel prayer spire was constructed in 1991. The Crystal Cathedral became the new venue for Robert Schuller's Hour of Power television broadcasts on Sunday mornings. These broadcasts regularly reached a worldwide audience of 20 million viewers. In a 2011 Los Angeles Times article, Bishop Tod Brown mentioned that, over the years, foreign priests visiting the Diocese of Orange invariably asked to visit the Crystal Cathedral.

=== Bankruptcy and sale ===
By early 2010, Crystal Cathedral Ministries was in deep financial trouble due to high costs and reduced contributions resulting from the Great Recession of 2007 to 2009. It was facing multiple lawsuits from unpaid creditors, with one board member estimating that they were $55 million in debt. It was also facing a contentious transition from the leadership of Robert and Avella Schueller.

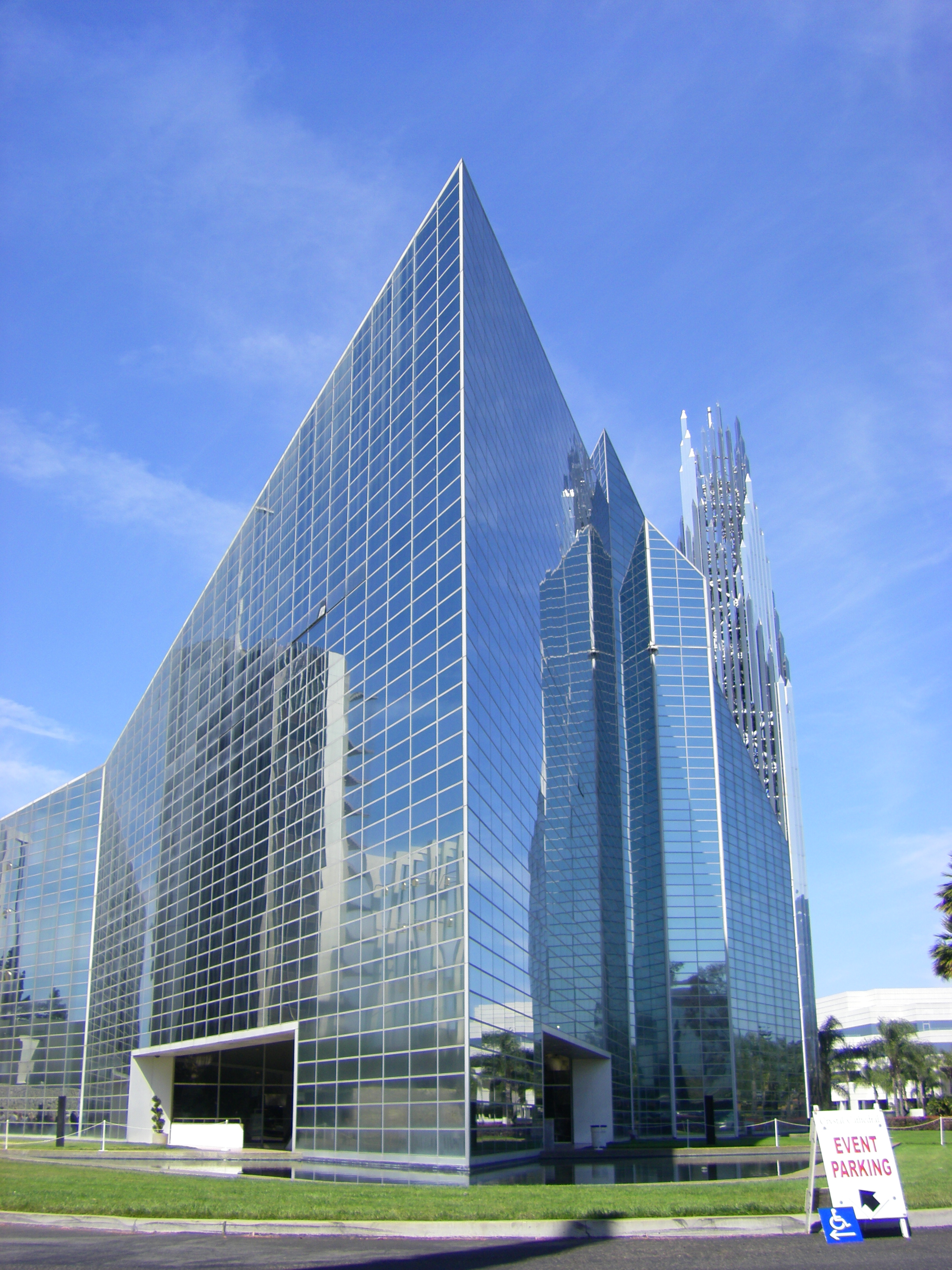
The Crystal Cathedral's exterior, as seen in 2009.

The ministries' board filed for bankruptcy protection on October 18, 2010, citing $43 million in debt, including a $36 million mortgage. Ministries officials tried to negotiate a payment plan with their creditors. However, after receiving several lawsuits and writs of attachment, the Crystal Cathedral Ministries was forced to file for bankruptcy. After the filing, the ministries received offers for the Crystal Cathedral campus from a real estate investment group and Chapman University in Orange. Chapman offered $59 million for the campus, planning to use it for health sciences studies and possibly a medical school.

On July 7, 2011, the Roman Catholic Diocese of Orange announced that it was "potentially interested" in purchasing the Crystal Cathedral campus. The diocese had purchased land in Santa Ana to build a new cathedral (having outgrown the Holy Family Cathedral in Orange), but found that it would be more cost-effective to renovate and repurpose the Crystal Cathedral campus and its buildings instead, and that Garden Grove was a more accessible location within the diocese than Santa Ana. The diocese made an initial offer of $50 million for the property, then increased it to $53.6 million. The diocese also offered to let Crystal Cathedral Ministries lease an "alternative worship space of at least 50,000 square feet" on the campus for up to 15 years.

Sheila Colman, the new director of the ministries, accepted this offer. The ministries' board originally planned to accept the higher offer from Chapman, but expressed a desire for the property to remain a religious institution. On November 17, 2011, Bankruptcy Court Judge Robert N. Kwan approved the sale of the Crystal Cathedral to the Diocese of Orange for $57.5 million (equivalent to $82 million in 2025).

Days after the sale was approved, the Italian newspaper La Stampa published a report that Pope Benedict XVI was forming a new Vatican commission to investigate irregularly designed churches and cathedrals that "remind people of anything but the mystery and sacredness of a church", such as designs with "glass boxes" and "crazy shapes"; the article was illustrated with a photograph of the Crystal Cathedral. Ultimately, this did not prove to be an issue; two weeks after the sale was approved, Bishop Brown secured approval from the Vatican to transfer the diocese to the campus.

=== Transition to Christ Cathedral ===
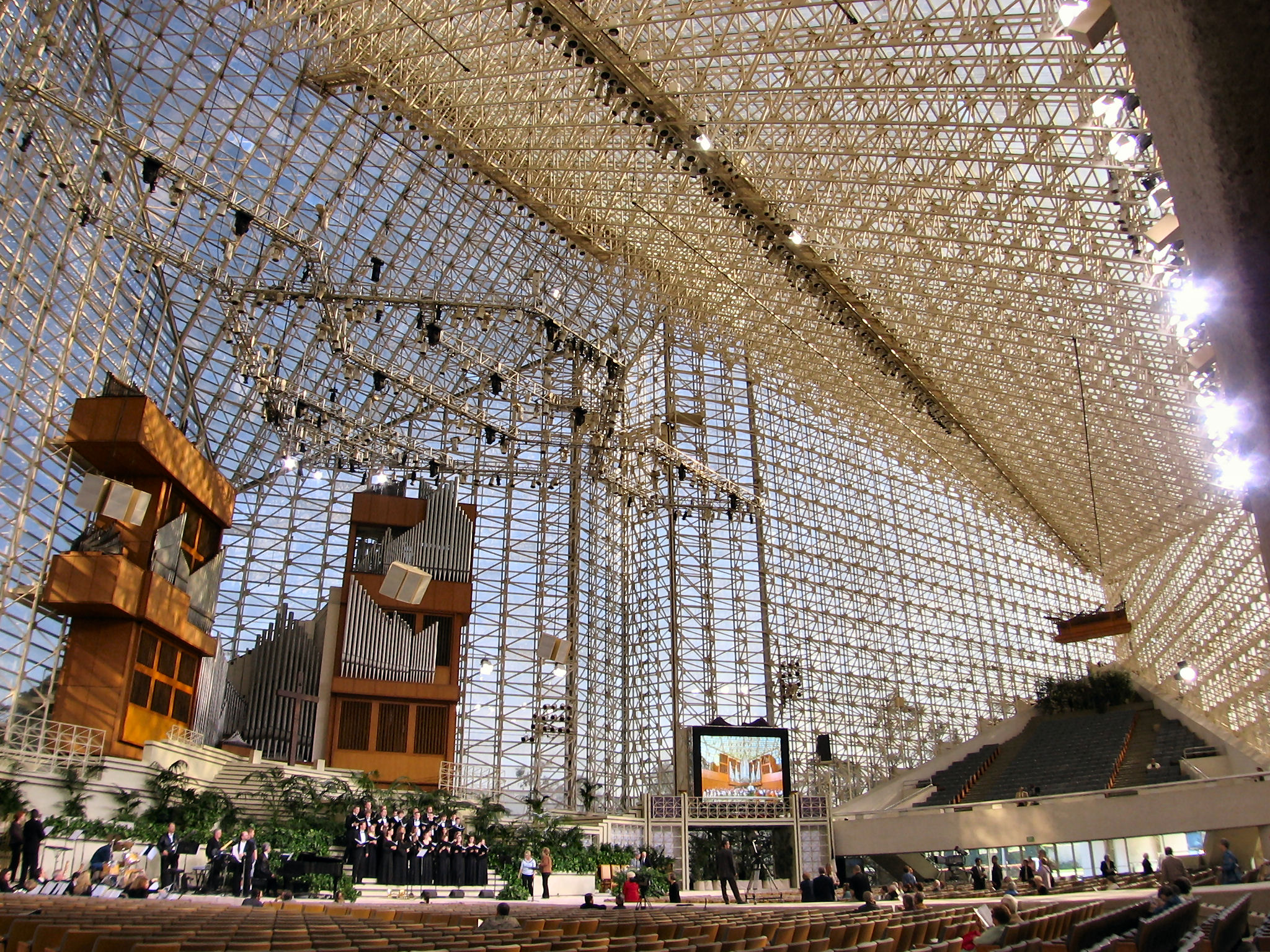
The Crystal Cathedral's interior, as seen in 2005.

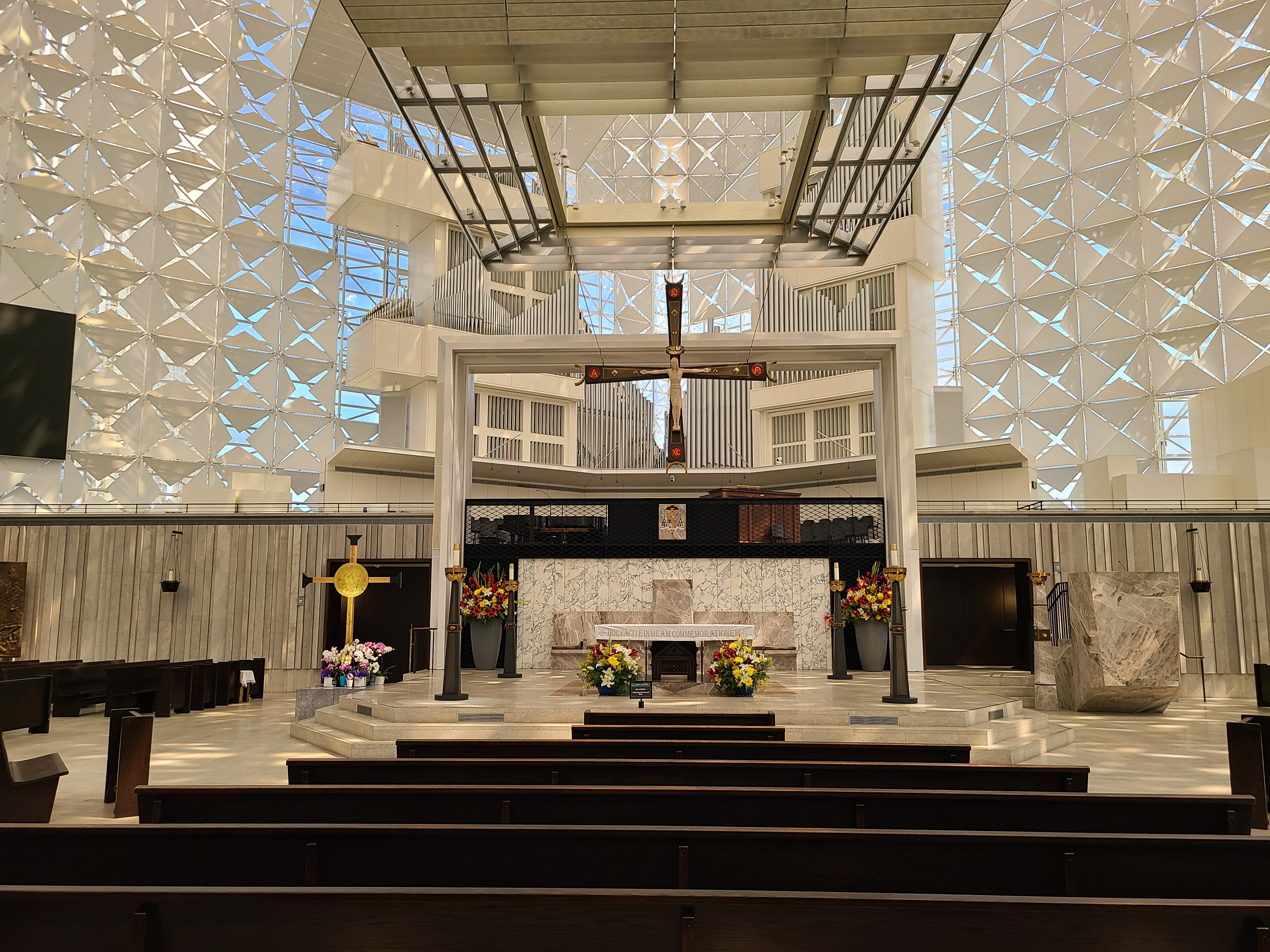
Altar, baldacchino, crucifix, organ in 2025

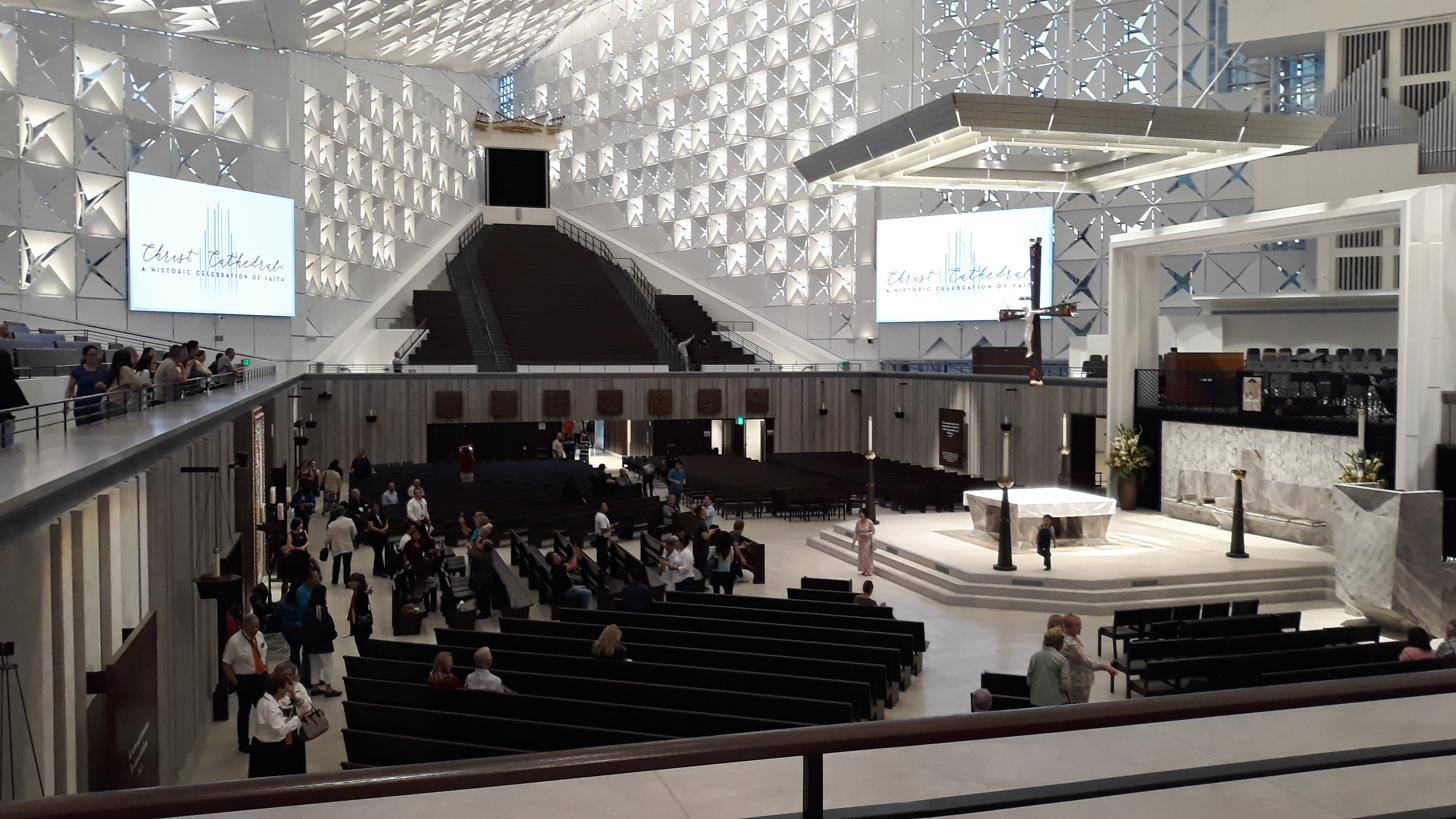
Christ Cathedral following the renovations, with Catholic liturgy, and the glass walls lined with "petals" to provide shade.

The Crystal Cathedral sale was finalized on February 3, 2012. The diocese then transferred the St. Callistus parish to the old Garden Grove church on the Cathedral campus, renaming it Christ Cathedral Parish. The campus cemetery was immediately transferred to the diocese, which quickly moved its offices into the other campus buildings. Bishop Brown stated the diocese planned to renovate the cathedral's interior after Crystal Cathedral Ministries moved out, while maintaining the "iconic personality" of its architecture.

On June 9, 2012, the diocese announced that the building would be renamed "Christ Cathedral", with the Reverend Christopher Smith serving as its first rector and episcopal vicar. The name was chosen with input from the diocese and its members, and approved by the Vatican. In October 2012, before the property transfer, the diocese held its first event at the cathedral, the 7th Orange County Catholic Prayer Breakfast The Christ Cathedral Parish would continue until June 2013 to celebrate Masses and other liturgies at the old Garden Grove church, now known as the Arboretum.

Crystal Cathedral Ministries held its final worship service at the Crystal Cathedral on June 30, 2013. They held their next service at the former St. Callistus Church on July 7, 2013. The congregation, now much reduced, moved in 2018 to another facility, which it named Shepherd's Grove, in Irvine, California. The St. Callistus Catholic School moved into the former Crystal Cathedral Academy facility, changing its name to Christ Cathedral Academy, in September 2013. Robert Schuller died in 2015; his funeral service was conducted outside the cathedral.

==== Renovations ====
In November 2013, the Crystal Cathedral was closed to the public in preparation for a multi-year renovation of the building. William J Woeger of the De La Salle Brothers was appointed as the principal liturgical consultant, Los Angeles-based design firm Johnson Fain was hired as architect, and the Irvine-based Snyder Langston served as general contractor. The diocese unveiled renderings of Christ Cathedral in September 2014; the renovations aimed to make it suitable for the Catholic liturgy (including the construction of a sanctuary, ciborium, and altar) while preserving the structure's architectural qualities.

The cathedral's glass walls had created long-standing issues with heat, glare, and acoustics; the Diocese of Orange's vice president of philanthropy Tony Jennison noted that "you could see people fanning themselves and even wearing sunglasses on Hour of Power." To alleviate these issues, the glass walls were lined with angled quatrefoils—referred to as "petals"—to deflect heat and create shade. Lights would also be installed on the petals to illuminate the building and its exterior at night, creating an effect described as a "box of stars" that can be seen from afar. Along with the change in liturgy, the cathedral underwent seismic retrofitting, its 20 foot (6.1 m) glass doors were replaced with bronze doors, and air conditioning was installed in the Arboretum. The Hazel Wright Organ was disassembled and shipped back to Italy for an extensive, $2 million restoration.

On the campus, crape myrtle trees were planted along the path from the parking lot to the cathedral plazas; they were described as symbolizing the "beginning" of holiness as parishioners walk towards the altar, and by principal architect Frank Clementi as being akin to a "sacred heat map". To honor Schuller's legacy, the biblical sculptures he had commissioned for the property were retained, and plans were announced for a legacy garden that would display some of the sculptures, and include a wall inscribed with the names of Crystal Cathedral donors who were originally inscribed on stones along its "Walk of Faith" (which were removed as part of landscaping work). Catholic broadcaster EWTN leased a floor of the campus's Tower of Hope to construct a west coast studio.

Construction began in June 2017, with the diocese expecting the renovations to be completed by late-2018. To fund the renovations, the diocese first allocated $59 million in proceeds from its 2011 "For Christ Forever" fundraising campaign. In 2014, an anonymous benefactor contributed $20 million in additional funding. It was later determined that the diocese reached its cost estimates for the project without "serious study or professional recommendations"; in 2016, the diocese revised the estimated cost of the project to $108 million. To achieve cost savings, the diocese opted to use a locally sourced marble veneer instead of solid marble from Italy, and worked to keep more of the building's "bones" intact. This lowered the project's overall cost to $72 million.

==== Rededication and reopening ====
On June 29, 2018, Bishop of Orange Kevin Vann proclaimed a "holy year of preparation" ahead of the solemn dedication of the cathedral. On October 13, 2018, the quatrefoils were blessed and officially illuminated for the first time. The altar was installed in December 2018; the first-class relics placed in its reliquary are meant to reflect the ethnic diversity of Orange County's Catholic community, including relics connected to Vietnamese saint and martyr Andrew Dũng-Lạc, the eight Canadian Martyrs, the Spanish missionary Junípero Serra, Korean saint Andrew Kim Taegon, and Mexican bishop Rafael Guízar y Valencia.

A formal celebration event and concert by the Pacific Symphony was held at the cathedral on July 13, 2019. On July 17, 2019, the diocese held a Mass to formally rededicate the building as Christ Cathedral. The diocese opened the shrine of Our Lady of La Vang on the cathedral campus in 2021. The shrine includes a 12-foot-tall (3.7 m) statue of the Virgin Mary capped by a spiraling canopy. The St. Callistus Chapel and Crypts—situated in the building's basement—was completed in October 2024 and dedicated by Bishop Vann on October 14, 2024; this event marked the formal completion of the Christ Cathedral renovation project.

On October 14, 2026, the Mary Tolerton Hood chapel at the base of the Crean Tower was rededicated as a 24-hour chapel of perpetual adoration; the space features a Blessed Sacrament, 12 square columns and 33 cylindrical columns (representing the Twelve Tribes of Israel and Twelve Apostles, and Jesus's age respectively), and was renovated with air conditioning and a granite floor.

== Organ ==
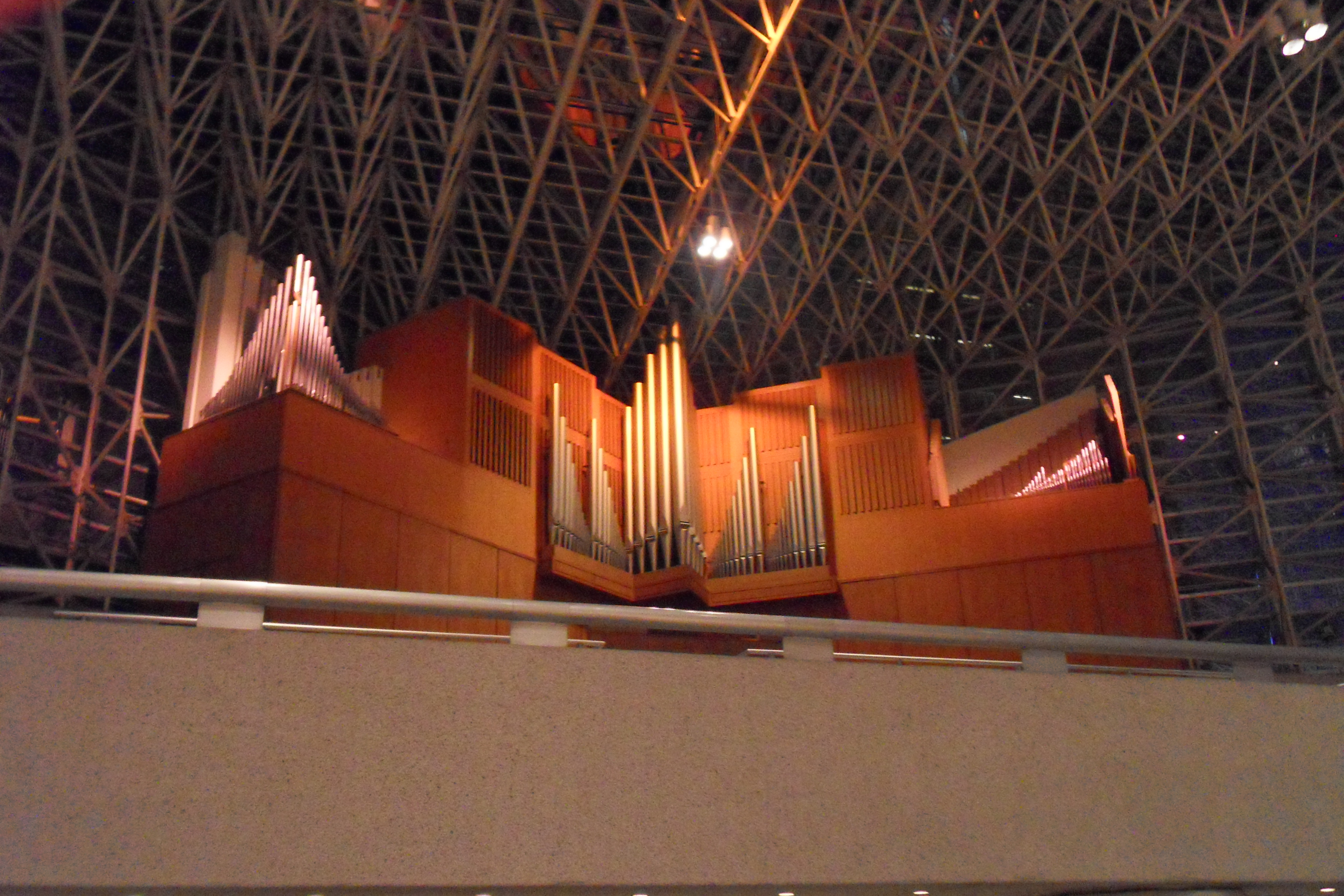
Hazel-Wright Organ

Christ Cathedral is home to the Hazel Wright Organ, the fifth largest pipe organ in the world, It was constructed by the firm Fratelli Ruffatti in Padua, Italy, based on specifications provided by the organists Virgil Fox and Frederick Swann. Swann served as the organist at the Crystal Cathedral from 1982 to 1998. The Hazel Wright Organ has 273 ranks and five manuals. It incorporates the large Aeolian-Skinner pipe organ built in 1962 for New York's Philharmonic Hall along with the smaller Ruffatti organ that was installed in the original Garden Grove church.

In 2013, the diocese dismantled the Hazel Wright Organ and shipped it back to Fratelli Ruffatti for a $2 million refurbishing. As part of the remodeled interior, the organ was also repainted white so that it would not draw attention away from the altar. It was reinstalled in Christ Cathedral in early 2020. However, the COVID-19 pandemic delayed the re-voicing of the organ until late 2021. The organ restoration was completed on February 7, 2022. A re-dedication concert featuring organist Hector Olivera was held on September 30, 2022.

== See also ==
- List of Catholic cathedrals in the United States
- List of cathedrals in the United States
