= Robert Schuller =

American television evangelist (1926–2015)

The Reverend Robert Schuller
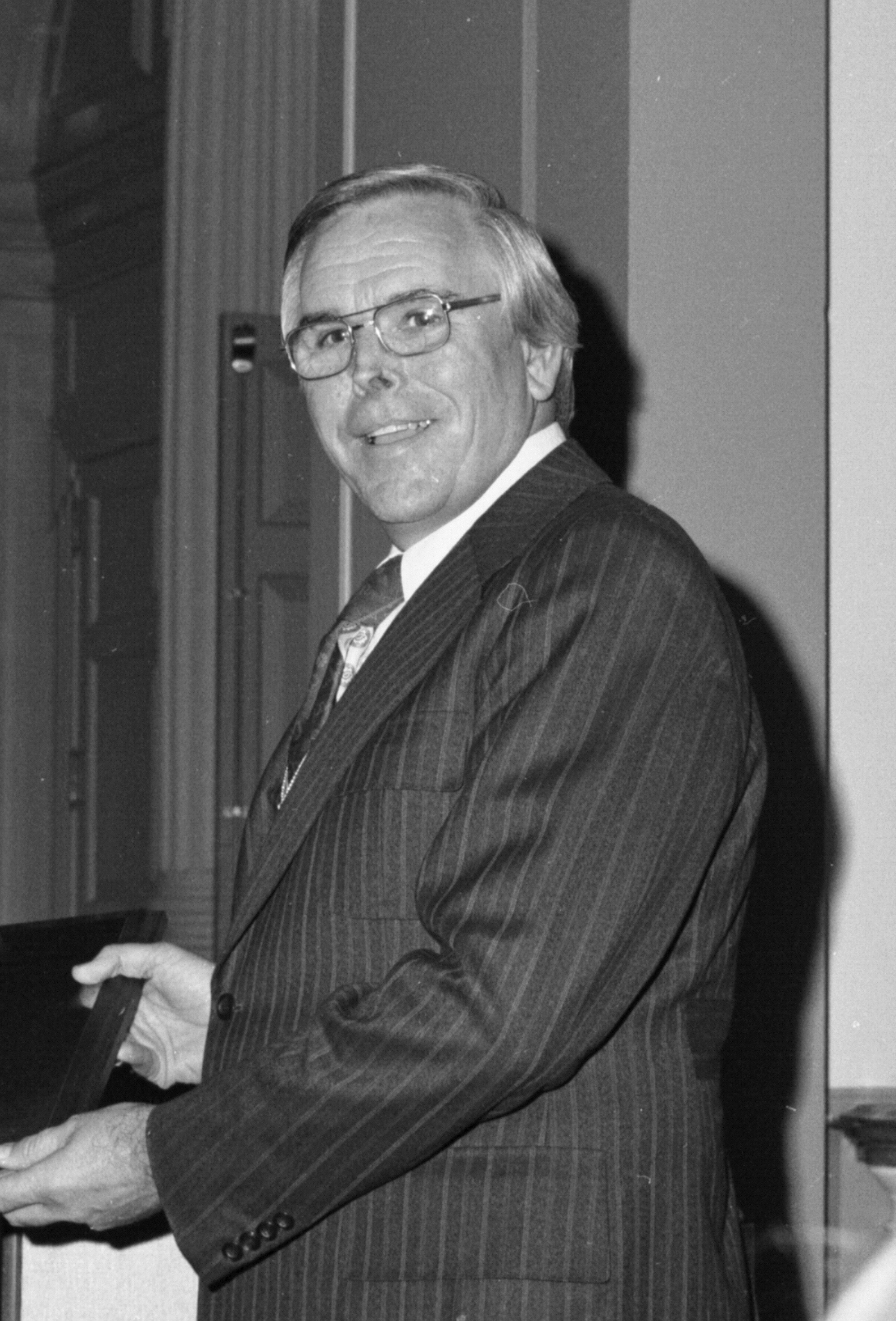
- Schuller in 1970
- Born: Robert Harold Schuller; September 16, 1926; Alton, Iowa, U.S.
- Died: April 2, 2015 (aged 88); Artesia, California, U.S.
- Resting place: Cathedral Memorial Gardens, Garden Grove, California, U.S.
- Education: Hope College, Western Theological Seminary
- Occupation: Christian minister
- Years active: 1955–2006
- Known for: "positive thinking" books
- Notable work: Tough Times Never Last, but Tough People Do
- Television: The Hour of Power (1970–2010)
- Spouse: Arvella De Haan Schuller (m. 1950; died 2014)
- Children: 5, including Robert A. Schuller
- Website: hourofpower.org

Signature
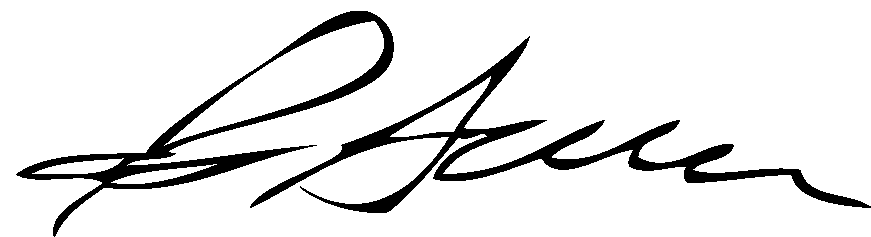

Robert Harold Schuller (September 16, 1926 – April 2, 2015) was an American Christian televangelist, pastor, motivational speaker, and author. Over five decades, Schuller pastored his church in Garden Grove, California starting in 1955. The weekly broadcast of Hour of Power television program followed began in 1970, and he led until his retirement in 2006. His grandson, Bobby Schuller, carries on the Hour of Power, which has aired for over fifty years. During his time as a minister, Schuller oversaw the construction of two churches in Garden Grove, California. The first church built under his tenure was the Garden Grove Community Church chapel which seated 500, and the second was the much larger Crystal Cathedral, which has a capacity of 2,200.

Schuller began broadcasting his Hour of Power program from the smaller Garden Grove chapel in 1969. He made the decision to begin his broadcast shortly after he had received encouragement from longtime friend Billy Graham during a visit with the popular evangelist. The Hour of Power broadcast later continued in the Crystal Cathedral.

The Schuller organization was not closely associated with any major scandal. During the 1990s, his televised sermons were regularly viewed by an estimated audience of 20 million. Schuller's weekly telecast was one of the first instances of weekly televised church services, and became the world's most widely watched hour-long church service.

== Early years ==
Robert Harold Schuller was born on September 16, 1926, near Alton, Iowa, the second son of Jennie (née Beltman; 1891–1970) and Anthony Schuller (1882–1964). He was the youngest of five children. All of his grandparents were Dutch immigrants, and he was raised on his parents' farm nearby in a small, close-knit community of Dutch-Americans, without running water.

In 1927 on the day of his baptism at his family's Reformed Church in Newkirk, Iowa, the six month old Schuller was clothed in a certain "baptismal-gown.” Years later Schuller announced that he had kept his baptismal-gown and placed it on display in his office, referring to it as his most-prized-possession. To Schuller apparently the gown had represented the day that his life had first been dedicated to God. In his later years Schuller placed an inscription beneath the gown reading: "This is the reason my life has been a success. As a child I was dedicated to our Lord."

In 1931, just weeks before his fifth birthday a visiting uncle, Henry Beltman, who was a minister had predicted that the young boy was destined to spread the word of God to many when he grew up. Schuller called the moment that he had first heard his uncle's prediction the "single most defining moment of my early life." After graduating from Newkirk High School in Newkirk, Iowa, in 1944, Schuller continued his education at Hope College, located in Holland, Michigan.

Schuller received his Master of Divinity degree in 1950 from Western Theological Seminary, which taught in the theological tradition and practice of John Calvin. He was soon ordained as a minister in the Reformed Church in America. After his ordination, he first worked at Ivanhoe Reformed Church in Riverdale, Illinois, before moving to Garden Grove, California.

== Evolution of the Crystal Cathedral ==
In Garden Grove, California in 1955 Schuller opened what would be his first church in the area, which he called the “Garden Grove Community Church.” As a result of not being able to secure any other suitable places to rent to start a church, Schuller decided to try out a relatively new concept in “church service presentation” known as the “Drive-in Church Model.“ His new church was located in the old Orange Drive-in Movie Theater where churchgoers could enjoy their church services from the comfort of their own cars. For the benefit of those who preferred more traditional church services, he later also rented a 300-seat former Baptist church, about four miles (6 km) down the road from his new drive-in theater church. On Sunday mornings Schuller would first preside at a 9:30 service in the Baptist chapel and then he would deliver his organ to the roof of the concession stand at the old drive-in theater where he would then preside over his second Sunday service. As the size of the congregations grew, Schuller purchased 10 acres (4.0 ha) of land at 12141 Lewis Street in Garden Grove for a "walk-in, drive-in" church, serving both congregations.

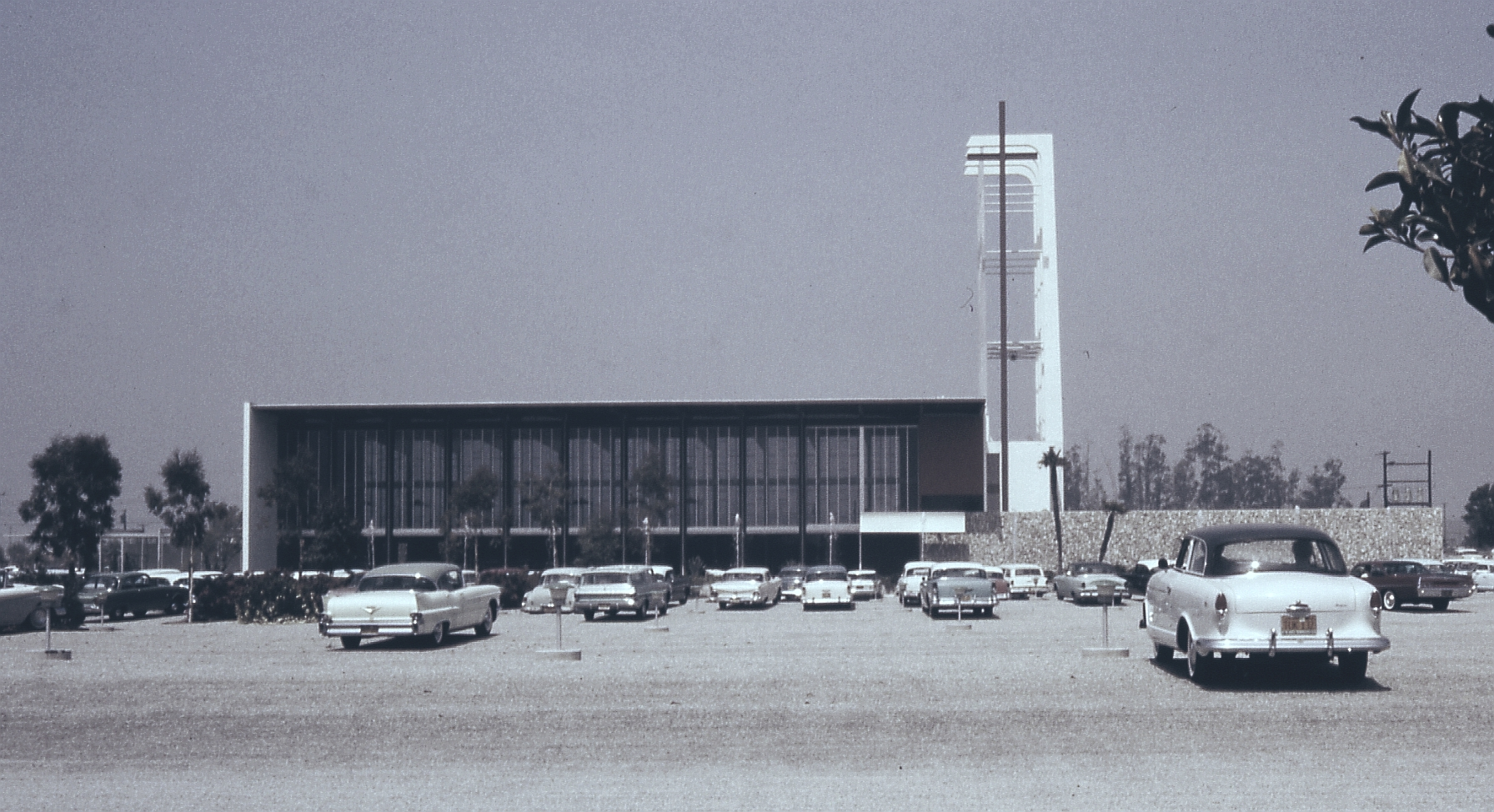
Garden Grove Community Drive-In Church, completed in 1961

Ground was broken September 10, 1958 for construction of Schuller's second church-home in the area, which was designed by international architect Richard Neutra. This second church was completed in 1961, at a cost of $3 million (equivalent to $32 million in 2025). The dedication service was held November 5, 1961. The design of the new church building enabled Schuller to preach his sermons to worshipers in 500 cars, as well as to members of the congregation inside the church. Schuller's second area church was built on what was to later become a part of the campus of his future (and much larger) "Crystal Cathedral Church."

Seven years later in 1968 a "Tower of Hope" steeple structure was added onto the north side of the property. The Tower of Hope structure rose 13 stories (approximately 130 to 150 feet (40 to 46 m)) into the air and was the tallest structure in Orange County at that time. The steeple structure was then topped by an illuminated cross which added another 90 feet (27 m) to the structure's overall height.

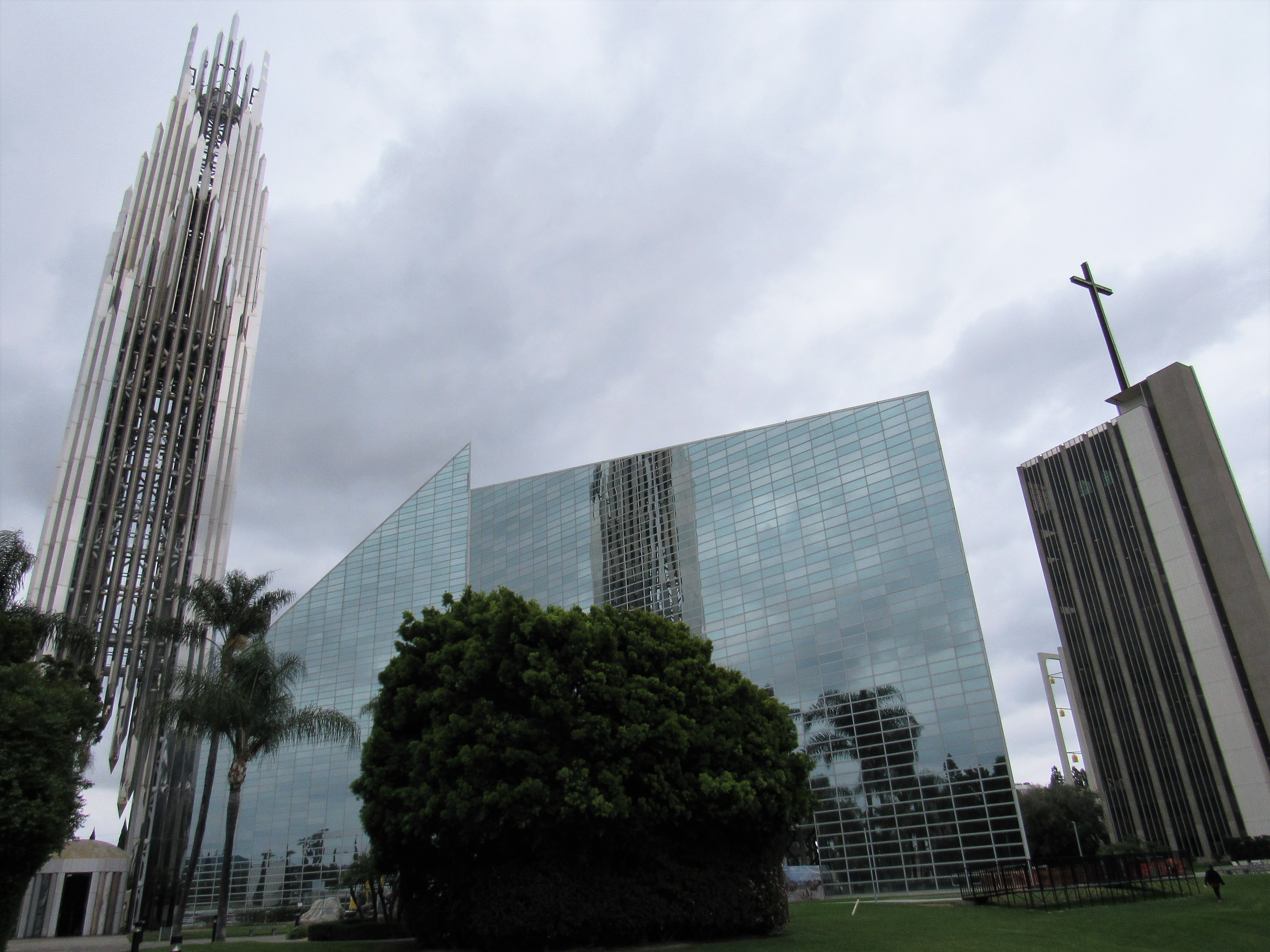
Crystal Cathedral, completed in 1980

Also in 1968, Schuller purchased a 10-acre (4.0 ha) walnut grove that had bordered on the north boundary of the then current Garden Grove Community Church property. This new purchase of land was to enable the construction of a future much larger Crystal Cathedral on the newly expanded property. The architectural firm of Philip Johnson/John Burgee was soon retained to draw up plans for a primarily glass church that would be able to accommodate over 2,000 church goers, which was to be built on a spot on the newly expanded church campus adjacent to the original church structure.

In order to meet the needs of the church's ever expanding congregation, the architectural firm designed a reflective glass building that could seat 2,248 people. At the time that it was built, the church was touted as "the largest glass building in the world." The church was dedicated on September 14, 1980. Once the newer, larger, and more noticeable "Crystal Cathedral" structure was completed, Schuller renamed his organization as the "Crystal Cathedral Ministries." Schuller's Crystal Cathedral Church soon became the iconic backdrop from which he preached his popular Hour of Power broadcasts every Sunday morning for the next 25 years. These broadcasts regularly reached a worldwide audience of 20 million.

== Ministry ==
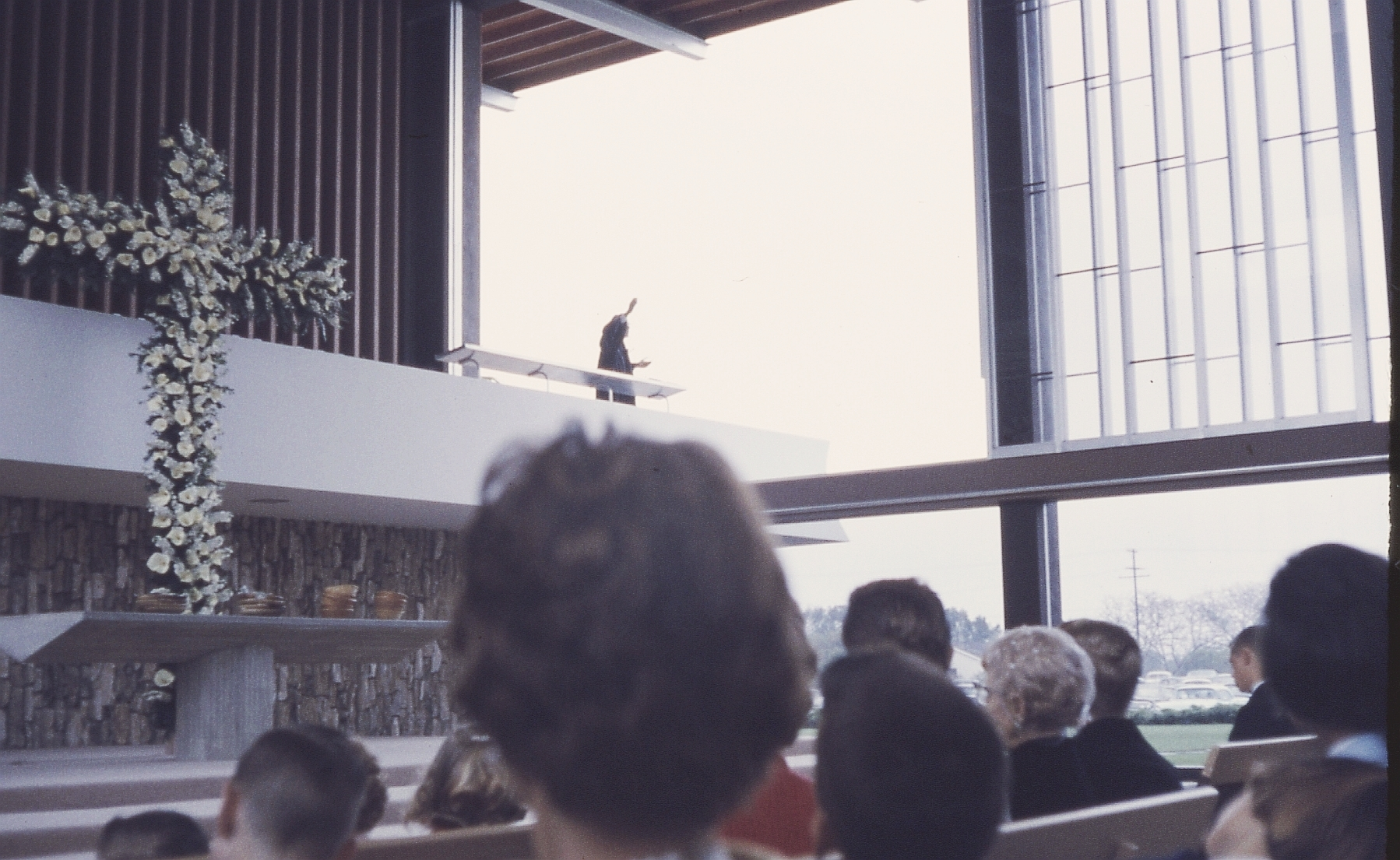
Inside the Garden Grove Community Drive-In Church, during a Schuller sermon, July 1962

Schuller emphasized what he believed are the positive aspects of the Christian faith. He deliberately avoided condemning people for sin, believing that Jesus "met needs before touting creeds". Once in a relationship with God, Schuller emphasized, someone who is sowing positive faith in his heart and actions will discover that the by-product is a reduction of sin.

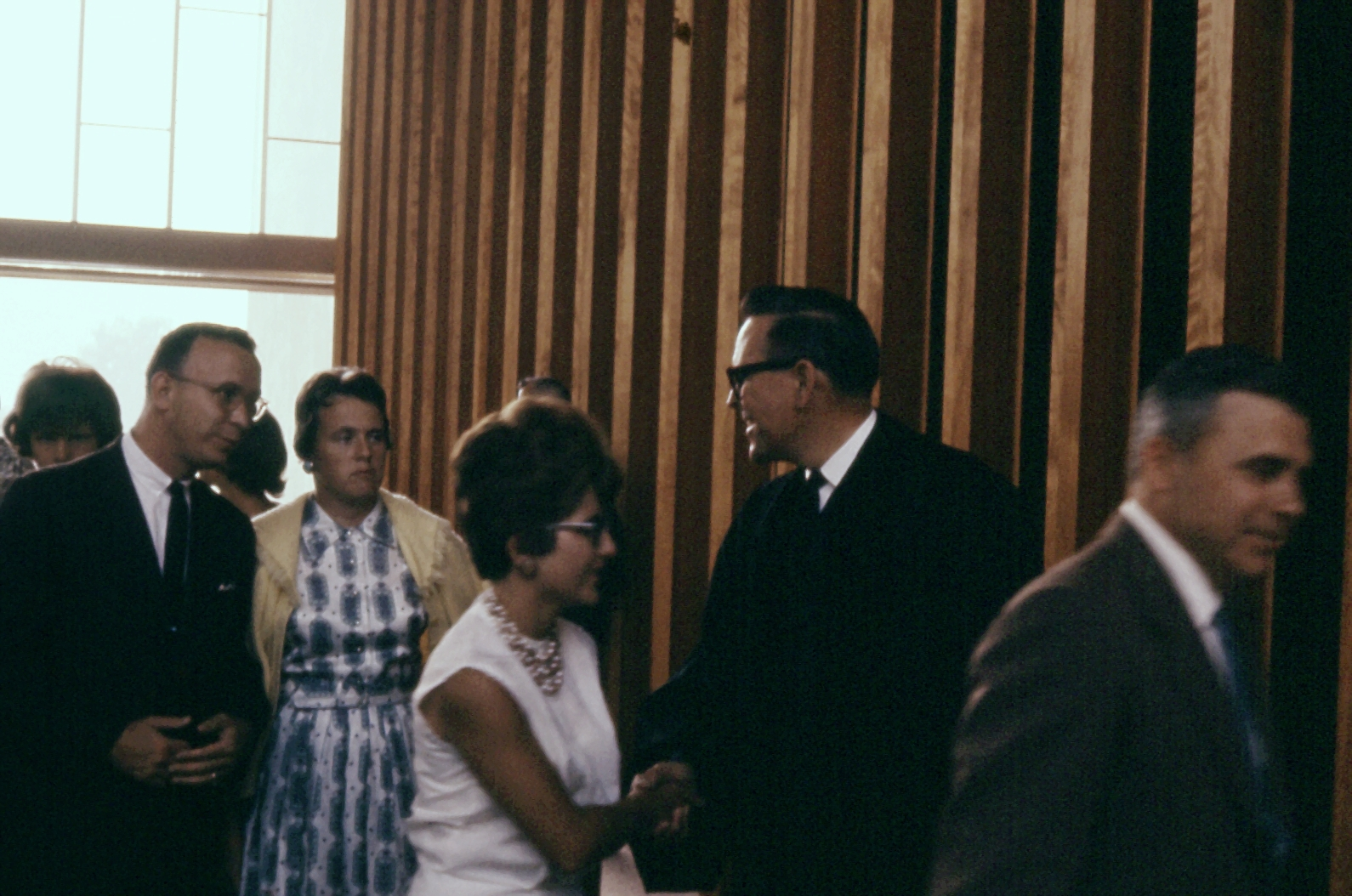
Schuller greeting parishioners after a Sunday service at the Garden Grove Community Drive-In Church, July 1962

He was known to say, "Sin is a condition before it is an action." Schuller encouraged Christians and non-Christians to achieve great things through God and to believe in their dreams. He wrote, "If you can dream it, you can do it!"

As the Crystal Cathedral's founding pastor, Schuller was seen and heard internationally on Sundays on the world's most widely watched hour-long church service, the Hour of Power, 1,500 of which were recorded.

== Personal life ==
On June 15, 1950, Schuller married Arvella De Haan (1929–2014), a church organist, who became instrumental in developing the music department at the Crystal Cathedral and was the creator and producer of the Hour of Power for over 40 years. The Schullers had five children: Sheila, Robert, Jeanne, Carol, and Gretchen.

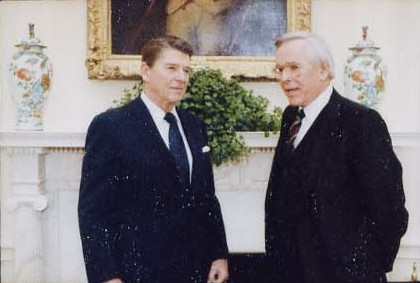
Schuller with President Ronald Reagan in 1982

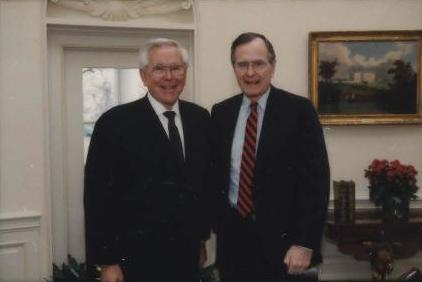
Schuller with President George H. W. Bush in 1991

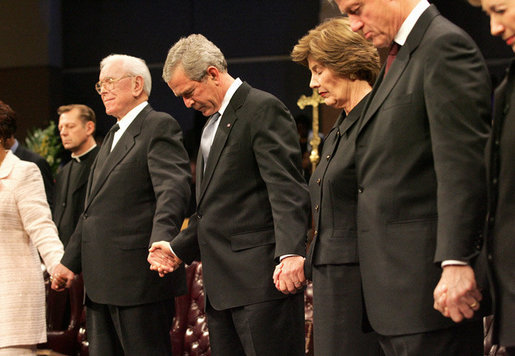
Schuller holding hands with President George W. Bush during a prayer at the homegoing celebration for Coretta Scott King at the New Birth Missionary Church in Atlanta in 2006

== Retirement and succession ==
On January 22, 2006, Schuller's son, Robert A. Schuller, assumed the role of senior pastor of the Crystal Cathedral. On October 25, 2008, however, he resigned. His father cited "a lack of shared vision" as the cause. Schuller stated that "different ideas as to the direction and the vision for this ministry" with his son "made it necessary ... to part ways in the Hour of Power television ministry". Schuller also said "I love my son and am proud of my son" and that the long-term survival of his ministry was dependent on expanding its imprint beyond the Schuller name. "The real minister's name that we honor is Jesus, not Schuller", he said. The ministry then opened the pulpit to a variety of notable Christian speakers.

On June 11, 2009, Schuller announced that the church's leadership would pass to his eldest daughter, Sheila Schuller Coleman. On July 11, 2010, he announced that he was retiring as principal pastor of the Crystal Cathedral and would become chairman of the church's board of directors. After a year as interim senior pastor, Sheila Schuller Coleman was elevated to senior pastor in July 2010.

== Bobby Schuller as pastor of Shepherd's Grove Church ==
In the wake of Robert Schuller's retirement and after much sorting out, in 2013 Robert H. Schuller's grandson, Bobby V. Schuller, moved the remaining congregation from the Crystal Cathedral building and eventually into the Shepherd's Grove church building in nearby Irvine, California. From 2013 to 2018, the congregation also temporarily leased what had formerly been the St. Callistus Catholic church in Garden Grove for their Sunday services. During these years, Schuller's grandson took over the leadership of the remaining congregation and also resumed the broadcast of his grandfather's Hour of Power weekly TV broadcast.

The Crystal Cathedral building and its campus were then sold to the Roman Catholic Diocese of Orange for use as its diocesan cathedral and offices. Subsequently, the Diocese of Orange renamed the building Christ Cathedral.

== Final years ==
On October 18, 2010, during the Great Recession in the United States, Sheila Coleman announced that the Crystal Cathedral was seeking bankruptcy protection.

In May 2011, the senior Schullers were dismissed from the ministry at the Crystal Cathedral. They filed for bankruptcy. The creditors would be paid in full plus interest. In July 2011, it was reported in the Orange County Register that Schuller had been ousted from the Crystal Cathedral board. In July 2011, Coleman attempted to reverse the decision that had been made in her absence, saying, "Dad will continue to provide leadership for this ministry through me for as long as possible" and, "I have and will continue to defer to his wisdom and honor him for his unprecedented accomplishments."

On January 24, 2013, the Crystal Cathedral's board of directors voted to make Bobby Schuller, Schuller's grandson (son of Robert Anthony Schuller), the new pastor for the Hour of Power television program as well as a non-voting member of the board.

On August 25, 2013, Robert H. Schuller was diagnosed with esophageal cancer that had spread to the lymph nodes. A follow-up examination in September 2013 presented Schuller with the possibility of undergoing chemotherapy and radiation therapy that could extend his life. Schuller then agreed to receive the cancer treatments, which may have been responsible for extending his life by nearly two more years as had been predicted by his physicians.

Arvella Schuller died on February 11, 2014, aged 84. The Schullers had been married for 63 years.

Schuller died peacefully, early on the morning of April 2, 2015, at a nursing facility in Artesia, California, aged 88. His funeral was held at Christ Cathedral, the former campus of the Crystal Cathedral. He is interred next to his wife at the Christ Cathedral Memorial Gardens Cemetery in Garden Grove, California.

== Writings ==
Schuller authored over 30 hardcover books, 6 of which made The New York Times and Publishers Weekly bestseller lists, including:

- Way to the Good Life (1963)
- Your Future Is Your Friend (1964), Wm B. Eerdmans Publishing Co. Reprinted 1991 by Cathedral Press. A devotional on the 23rd Psalm.
- Move Ahead With Possibility Thinking (1967)
- Self-Love (1975)
- You Can Be the Person You Want to Be (1976)
- Toughminded Faith for Tenderhearted People (1979), Thomas Nelson, ISBN 0-8407-5329-2
- Self-Esteem: The New Reformation (1982)
- Tough Times Never Last But Tough People Do (1983), Thomas Nelson ISBN 978-0-8407-5287-1
- The Power of Being Debt Free (1985); Thomas Nelson Publishing, ISBN 0-8407-5461-2
- Living Positively One Day at a Time (1986)
- Success Is Never Ending, Failure Is Never Final (1990)
- Life's Not Fair, But God Is Good (1991)
- Possibility Thinking (1993)
- Prayer: My Soul's Adventure with God (1995), Doubleday ISBN 978-0-385-48505-0
- If It's Going to Be It's Up to Me (1997)
- My Journey: From an Iowa Farm to a Cathedral of Dreams (2001)
- Hours of Power (2004)
- Don't Throw Away Tomorrow (2005)
