= Hour of Power =

American Evangelist television program

Coordinates: 33.677030°N 117.805660°W

- Also known as: Hour of Power
- Genre: Protestant television
- Presented by: Robert H. Schuller (1970–2006); Robert A. Schuller (2006-2008); Sheila Schuller Coleman (2009–2012); Bobby Schuller (2012–present)
- Opening theme: The Hymn of Joy
- Country of origin: United States
- Original language: English
- No. of seasons: 51
- No. of episodes: 2,662

Production
- Production locations: Irvine, California
- Running time: 60 minutes

Original release
- Network: First-run syndication
- Release: February 8, 1970 – present

Hour of Power is a weekly American Evangelist television program broadcast from Shepherd's Grove Presbyterian Church in Irvine, California, near Los Angeles. It was formerly one of the most watched religious broadcasts in the world, seen by approximately two million viewers at its peak. It was formerly broadcast from the Crystal Cathedral in Garden Grove, California.

The program was founded and first hosted by Robert H. Schuller. It is currently hosted by Bobby Schuller, who is Robert H. Schuller's grandson.

The program is normally one hour long, but some networks broadcast an edited 30-minute program.

== History ==
The Garden Grove Community Church of the Reformed Church in America aired its first televised worship under the Hour of Power name on February 8, 1970. By the 1980s, it was the most-watched weekly religious program in the United States. Originally hosted by Robert H. Schuller, his son and frequent co-host Robert A. Schuller hosted it from 2006 to 2008.

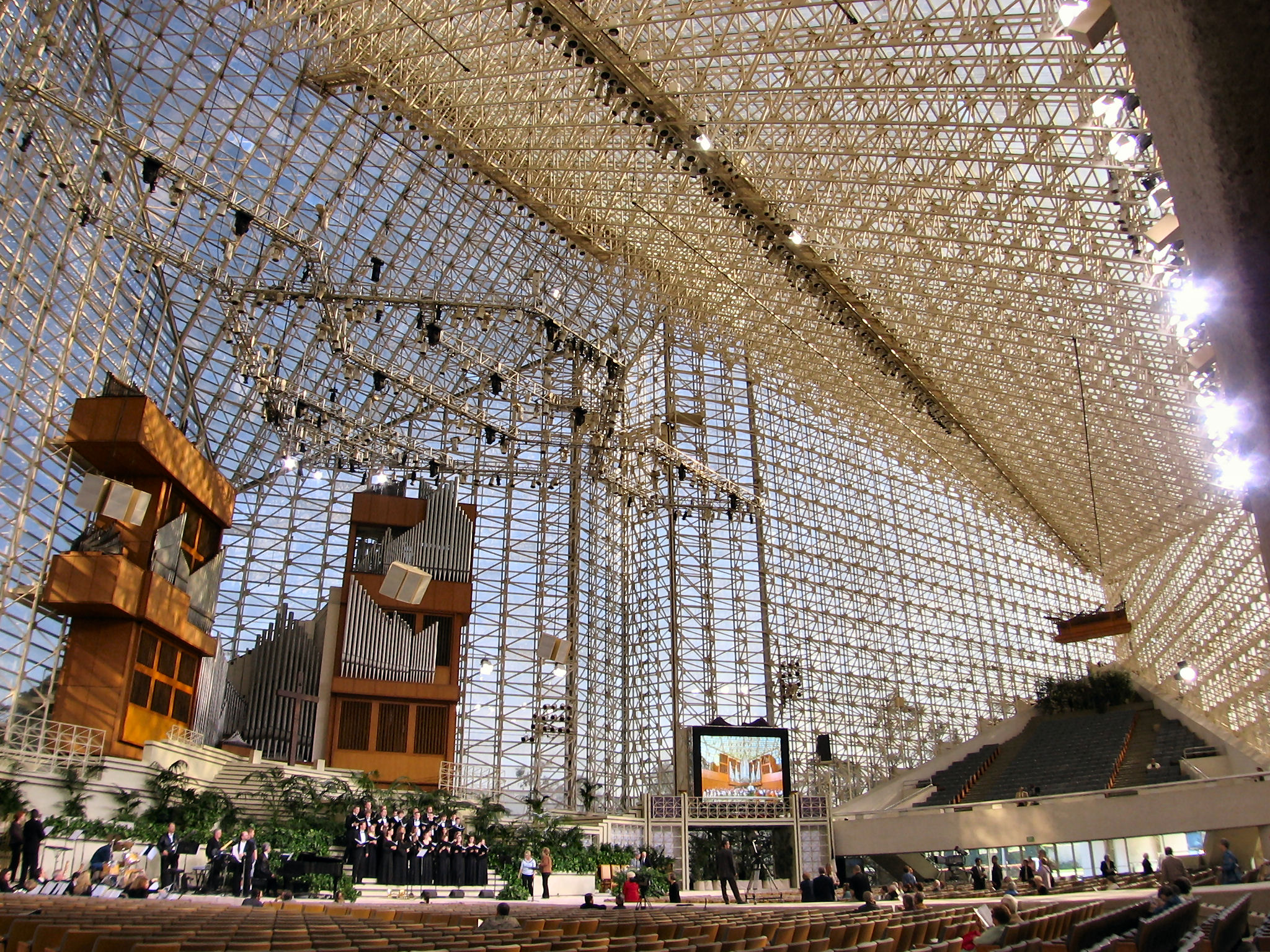
Crystal Cathedral where the Hour of Power program was previously broadcast

On October 26, 2008, it was announced that the elder Schuller had removed his son as the program’s host and Crystal Cathedral Ministries’ teaching pastor, but allowed him to remain as the church’s senior pastor. Robert H. Schuller said that he wanted to take the ministry in a different direction and for the foreseeable future would use guest speakers for the weekly services rather than his son. Well-known speakers who were used in the early stages of the new format included Lee Strobel, John C. Maxwell, and Bill Hybels. On November 29, 2008, the church announced that the younger Schuller had resigned.

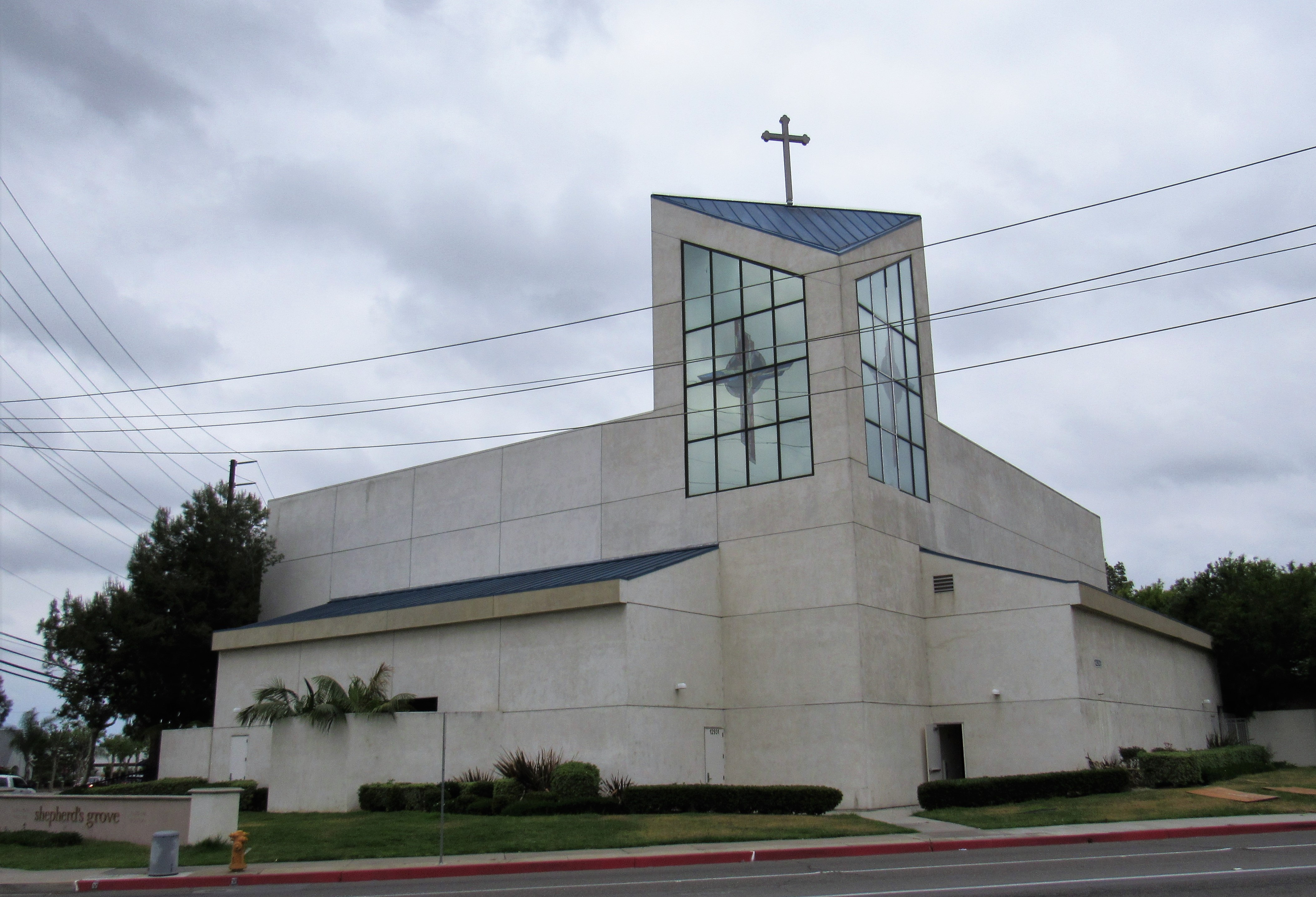
Shepherd's Grove

On March 10, 2012, it was announced that Robert H. Schuller and his wife, Arvella, would be leaving the church. The following day their elder daughter, Sheila Schuller Coleman, announced at the morning service that she would also be leaving the church, therefore cutting all family ties with the Crystal Cathedral and Hour of Power. That week's broadcast would also be the program's final broadcast " The ministry's successor, the Rev. Bill Bennett, said that the ministry would continue but using a more traditional service.

In June 2012, the Rev. Bobby Schuller, the son of Robert A. Schuller, started preaching on a voluntary basis. In February 2013, Bobby Schuller was named as pastor for the Hour of Power.

Crystal Cathedral Ministries held its final service at its namesake on June 30, 2013, after which it was renamed Shepherd's Grove and moved to the former St. Callistus Church on July 7, 2013. The congregation merged with the Irvine Presbyterian Church in April 2018 after the land was sold to real estate developers.

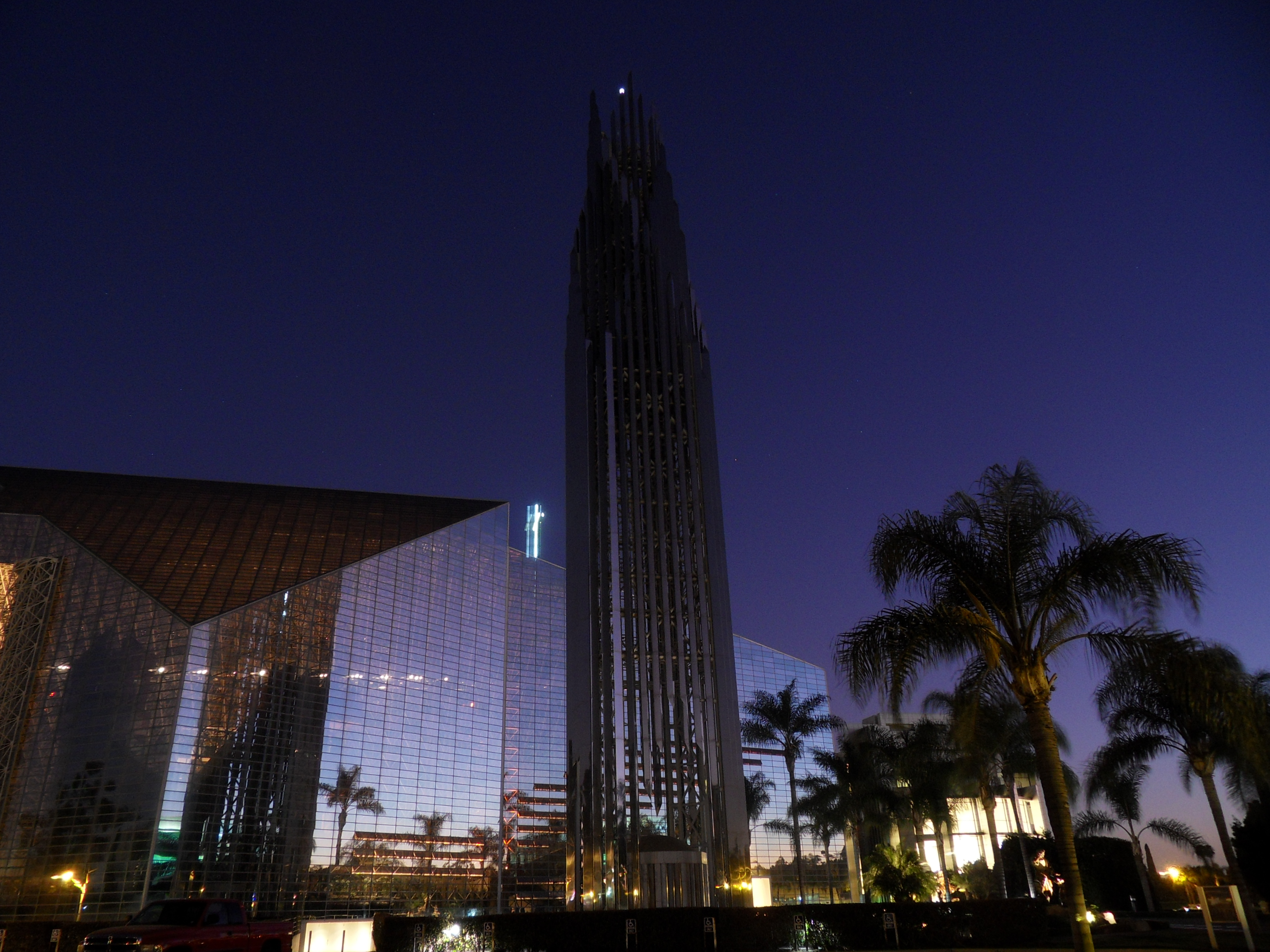

== Broadcasts ==
The program airs in the United States mainly using paid programming time on Freeform, TBN, and recently Daystar. along with about 100 stations through individual contracts. The program also airs over the American Forces Network.

In Canada it is carried on VisionTV.

In Europe it is broadcast on VOX in Austria, Germany and Switzerland, on RTL in the Netherlands and was formerly broadcast on Sky One in Ireland and the United Kingdom.

In the Middle East it is carried on METV in Israel, Jordan, Lebanon, and Syria.

In Australia, it is seen on the Australian Christian Channel and Network Ten. It is also broadcast weekly on radio.

It is broadcast in New Zealand on the Prime network and Shine TV.

It is broadcast in Hong Kong on NOW TV Channel 564, TVB Pearl, and Hong Kong Open TV.

The Hour of Power telecast, filmed in the Crystal Cathedral's main sanctuary, at one point attracted 1.3 million viewers from 156 countries. Under current Pastor Bobby Schuller, the program attracted 2.2 million viewers worldwide each week.

== Finances ==
Beginning in the late 1990s, the ministry struggled financially after it borrowed money to build a visitors' center.

The 2008 revenues for the program were nearly $5 million lower than revenues for 2007. As of early 2009, the church planned to sell more than $65 million worth of its Orange County property to pay off debt: 150 acres (0.61 km^{2}) in San Juan Capistrano, California, and an office building in Garden Grove, California. Due to their financial situation, the Roman Catholic Diocese of Orange purchased the Garden Grove campus.
