= Loras College =

Private university in Dubuque, Iowa, US

- Former names: Saint Raphael's Seminary/Academy (1839–1850); Mount St. Bernard's College and Seminary (1850–1873); St. Joseph's College (1873–1914); Dubuque College (1914–1920); Columbia College (1920–1939)
- Motto: Pro Deo Et Patria
- Motto in English: For God And Country
- Type: Private college
- Established: 1839; 187 years ago
- Founder: Bishop Mathias Loras
- Religious affiliation: Archdiocese of Dubuque
- Academic affiliations: Space-grant
- Chancellor: Thomas Zinkula
- President: Michael Doyle
- Students: 1,235 (fall 2024)
- Undergraduates: 1,169 (fall 2024)
- Postgraduates: 66 (fall 2024)
- Location: Dubuque, Iowa, U.S. 42°30′18″N 90°40′48″W
- Loras College Historic District
- U.S. National Register of Historic Places
- U.S. Historic district
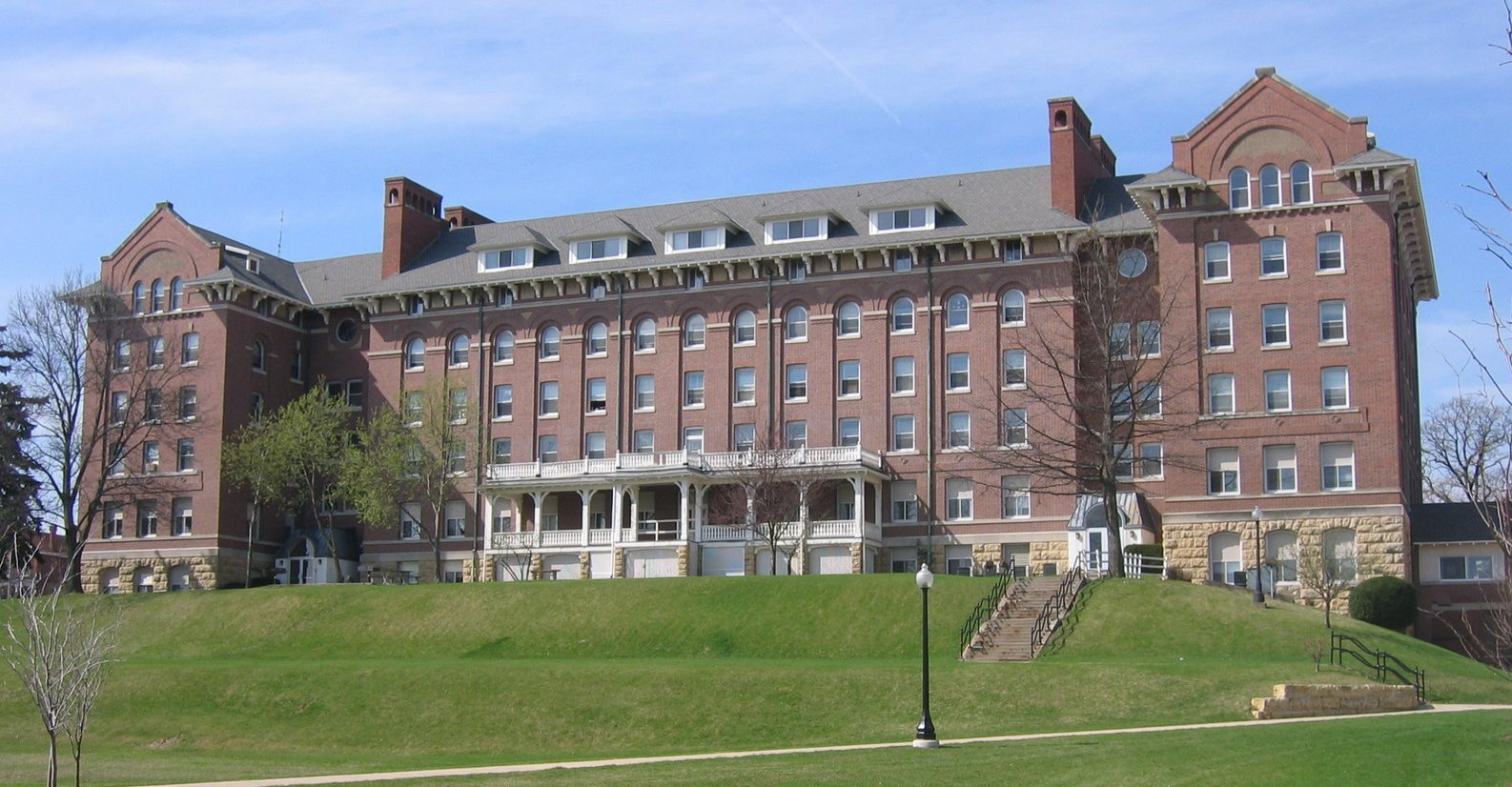
- Keane Hall
- NRHP reference No.: 100005277
- Added to NRHP: June 19, 2020
- Campus: 64 acres (26 ha); Urban
- Colors: Purple and Vegas Gold
- Nickname: Duhawks
- Sporting affiliations: Division III - ARC; CCIW
- Mascot: Dewey
- Website: loras.edu

Loras College is a private Catholic college in Dubuque, Iowa, United States. It has an enrollment of approximately 1,600 students and is the oldest post-secondary institution in the state of Iowa.

Loras offers both undergraduate and graduate degree programs. It is one of four four-year post-secondary institutions in the city of Dubuque, one of four Catholic colleges in the Archdiocese of Dubuque, and one of six Catholic colleges in the state of Iowa. The campus was listed on the National Register of Historic Places as the Loras College Historic District in 2020.

== History ==
The college has had different names during its existence;

- Saint Raphael's Seminary and then Saint Raphael's Academy (1839–1850)
- Mount St. Bernard's College and Seminary (1850 – 1873)
- St. Joseph's College (1873 – 1914)
- Dubuque College (1914 – 1920)
- Columbia College (1920 – 1939)
- Loras College (1939 – present)

=== Saint Raphael/St. Bernard College ===
In 1839, Bishop Mathias Loras of the Diocese of Dubuque established Saint Raphael's Seminary for men in the back of Saint Raphael's Cathedral in Dubuque. His first students were four seminarians from France, two members of a Sioux tribe, and several local students. In 1850, Loras moved the seminary from downtown Dubuque to a more rural area in the city. He wanted fewer distractions for the students and farmland to grow food for the college. It was renamed Mount St. Bernard's College and Seminary. The first present of St. Bernard was Father Joseph Cretin, who later became the first bishop of the Diocese of Saint Paul. Loras became president of the college in 1855.

=== St. Joseph College ===
The financial Panic of 1857 caused severe financial losses at St. Bernard, forcing it to close in 1860. When John Hennessy became bishop in 1866, he started holding college courses in private residences. In 1873, he established St. Joseph's College in Dubuque with a high school and four-year college program. By 1878, St. Joseph had three departments: preparatory, commercial, and ecclesiastical. The next year, the Franciscan Sisters of Dubuque started running the so-called domestic department and the college added theology courses for the formation of priests.

By 1886, enrollment at St. Joseph had fallen to 56 students. The college then added a classical, philosophical and theological course with Christian doctrine and foreign languages. The college was incorporated in 1893 and was able to start offering academic degrees.

=== Dubuque College/Columbia College ===
St. Joseph became Dubuque College in 1914 and started offering a four-year degree program. St. Joseph was accredited in 1917 by the North Central Association of Colleges and started admitting women to its summer school in 1919.

During this period, Dubuque College came into conflict with the Dubuque German College over their similar names. To avoid a costly court battle, the two colleges agreed that Dubuque College would become Columbia College and Dubuque German College the University of Dubuque.

In 1934, the Catholic University of America in Washington D.C. started a graduate summer school program at Columbia. During this period, Archbishop Beckman founded the Columbia Museum of History, Art and Science at the college.

=== Loras College ===
In 1939, the year that Columbia College became Loras College, the national Catholic honor society, Delta Epsilon Sigma was founded at Loras. In 1963, when Catholic University of America discontinued its graduate program at Loras, the college initiated its Graduate Division, offering the Master of Arts degree in some fields. Loras became fully coeducational in 1971

In 1973, Loras introduced Associate of Arts and Associate of Science degrees. The Division of Community Education was initiated in 1975. In 1987, the administrations of Loras College and Clarke College in Dubuque began exploring a merger. However, after receiving overwhelming opposition to the move from the Loras faculty and students, the initiation was abandoned. The college removed the statue of Bishop Loras from the campus in 2020 after determining that he owned enslaved people from 1836 to 1852.

== Academics ==
Loras offers 49 majors, 11 stand-alone minors, and nine pre-professional programs for undergraduates. Undergraduates can also participate in summer classes, internships, field experience, study abroad, and other programs. For graduate programs, Loras offers a Master of Arts and a Master of Business Administration.

Loras is accredited by the Higher Learning Commission. The teacher education program, both at the graduate and undergraduate levels, is approved by the Iowa Department of Education. The undergraduate teacher education program is also accredited by the Council for the Accreditation of Educator Preparation. The American Chemical Society has approved the undergraduate chemistry program. The Council of Social Work Education accredits the social work major at the baccalaureate level.

== Campus ==
Loras College occupies a 65-acre (260,000 m^{2}) campus on several hills in Dubuque. The campus is bounded by Loras Boulevard on the south, Kirkwood Street on the north, Henion Street on the east, and Alta Vista Street on the west. It is surrounded by residential neighborhoods. The campus contains 23 buildings, two athletic fields, a stadium, and five tennis courts. The campus buildings include:

- Athletic Wellness Center: Opened in 2008, it is used for men's and women's basketball and volleyball along with men's wrestling. It contains a cardiovascular center, weight room and training room and locker rooms.
- Academic Resource Center: Home to the main library, with 355,000 items. The center also includes the bookstore
- Alumni Campus Center: A multi-function building that includes the student union, dining hall, and meeting rooms
- Christ the King Chapel: The main chapel on campus Built in 1946, is decorated in a pre-Vatican II Streamline Moderne architectural style. The chapel holds daily mass, Thursday night exposition of the Blessed Sacrament and reconciliation, and mass Sunday night with student lectors, cantors, musicians, extraordinary ministers of Holy Communion, greeters, acolytes, and sacristans. The chapel connects to Keane Hall via a skywalk. Reverend Aloysius Schmitt, the first chaplain killed during World War II, is interred in this chapel.
- Heitkamp Planetarium and Observatory: It was opened in 1964.
- Hoffmann Hall: The oldest building on the campus, with parts of the building built in 1902. It includes a clock tower, and houses various academic uses, a pre-Vatican II architectural-themed adoration chapel named St. Joseph's, along with St. Joseph's Auditorium. The auditorium is the home of the Loras Players, the oldest continually running theater group west of the Mississippi River. The auditorium stage features a turntable.
- Keane Hall: Located on the top of the highest hill in Dubuque. Designed by the architect Emmanuel Louis Masqueray, the building includes administrative offices, academics, and faculty offices.
- The Visitation Complex: The former convent of the Visitation Sisters, it now houses art and music classes. Gallagher Hall is used for recitals. The complex also houses an art museum and practice space for musicians.

=== Gallery ===
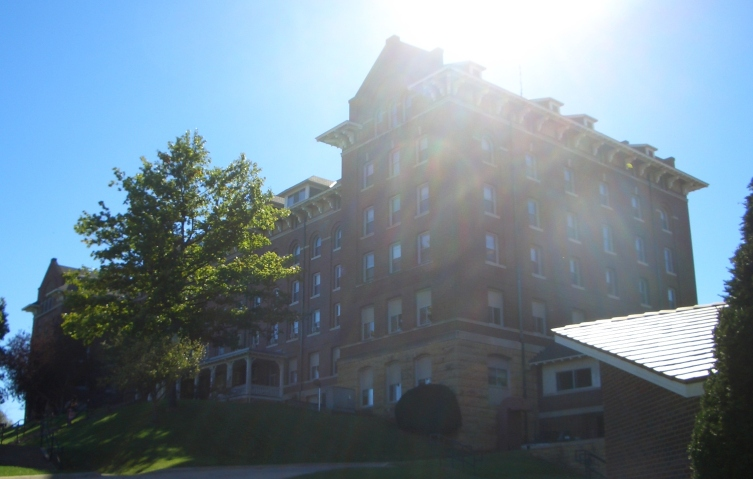
Keane Hall (2007)

Christ The King Chapel (2020)

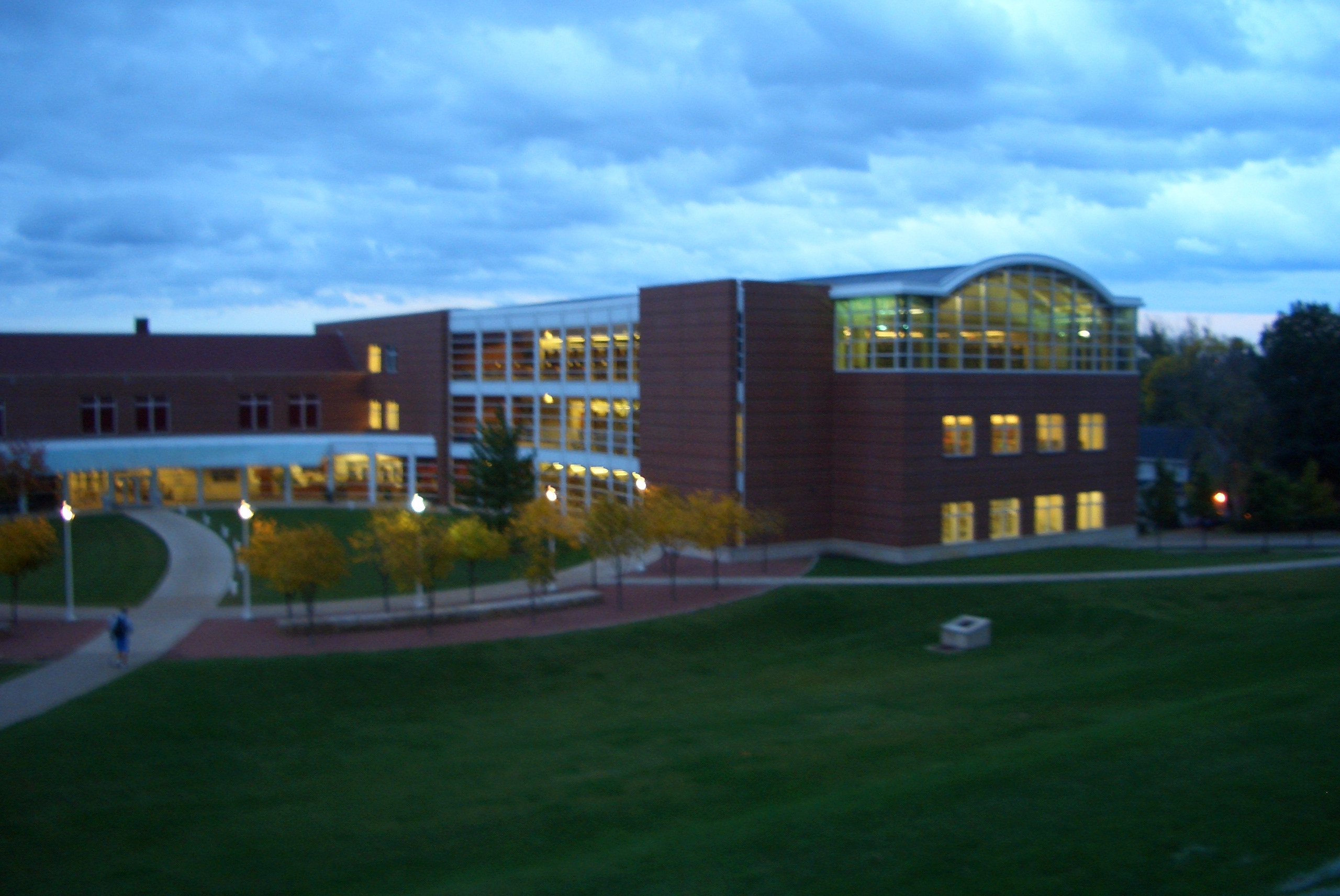
Academic Resource Center (2007)

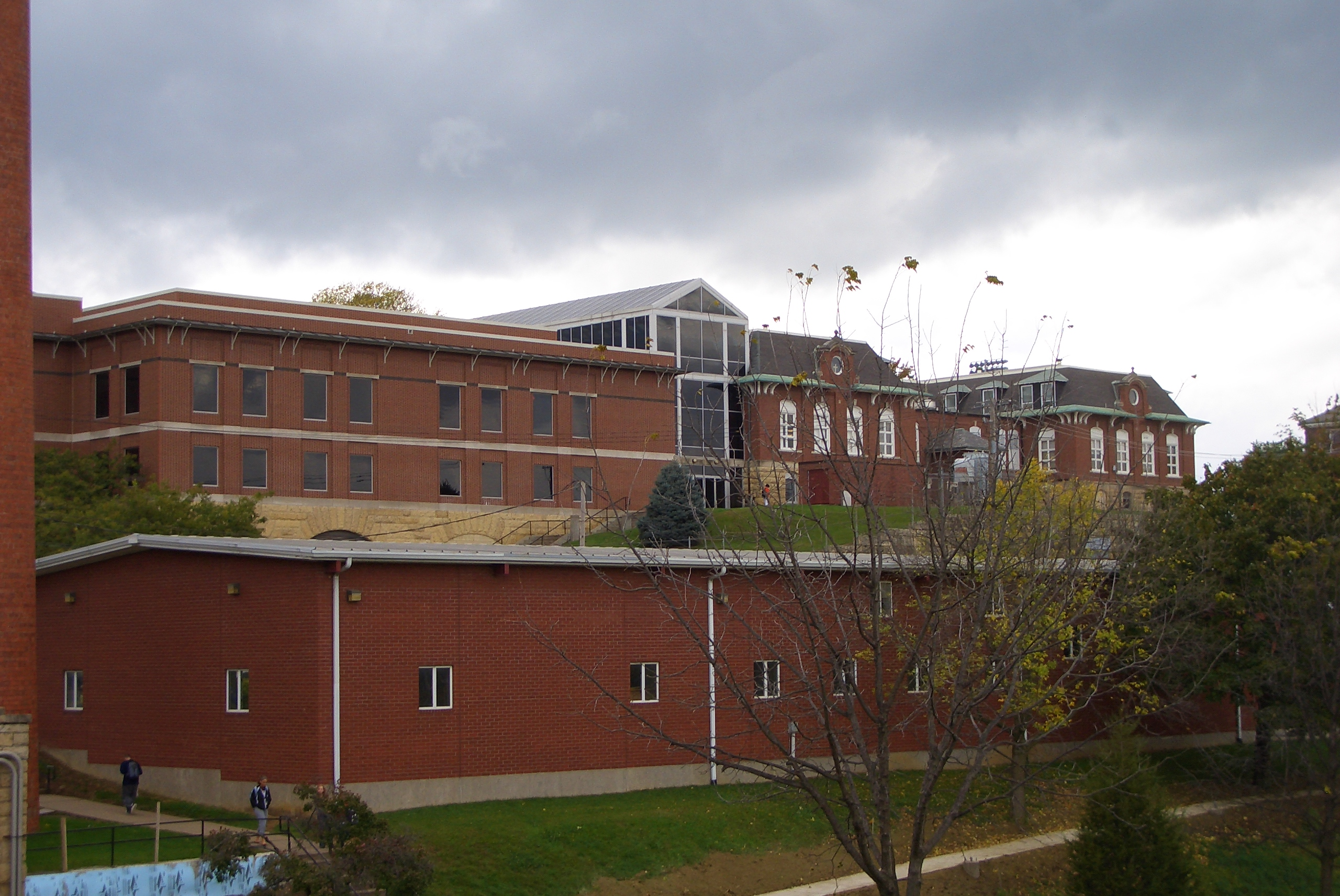
Alumni Campus Center (2007)

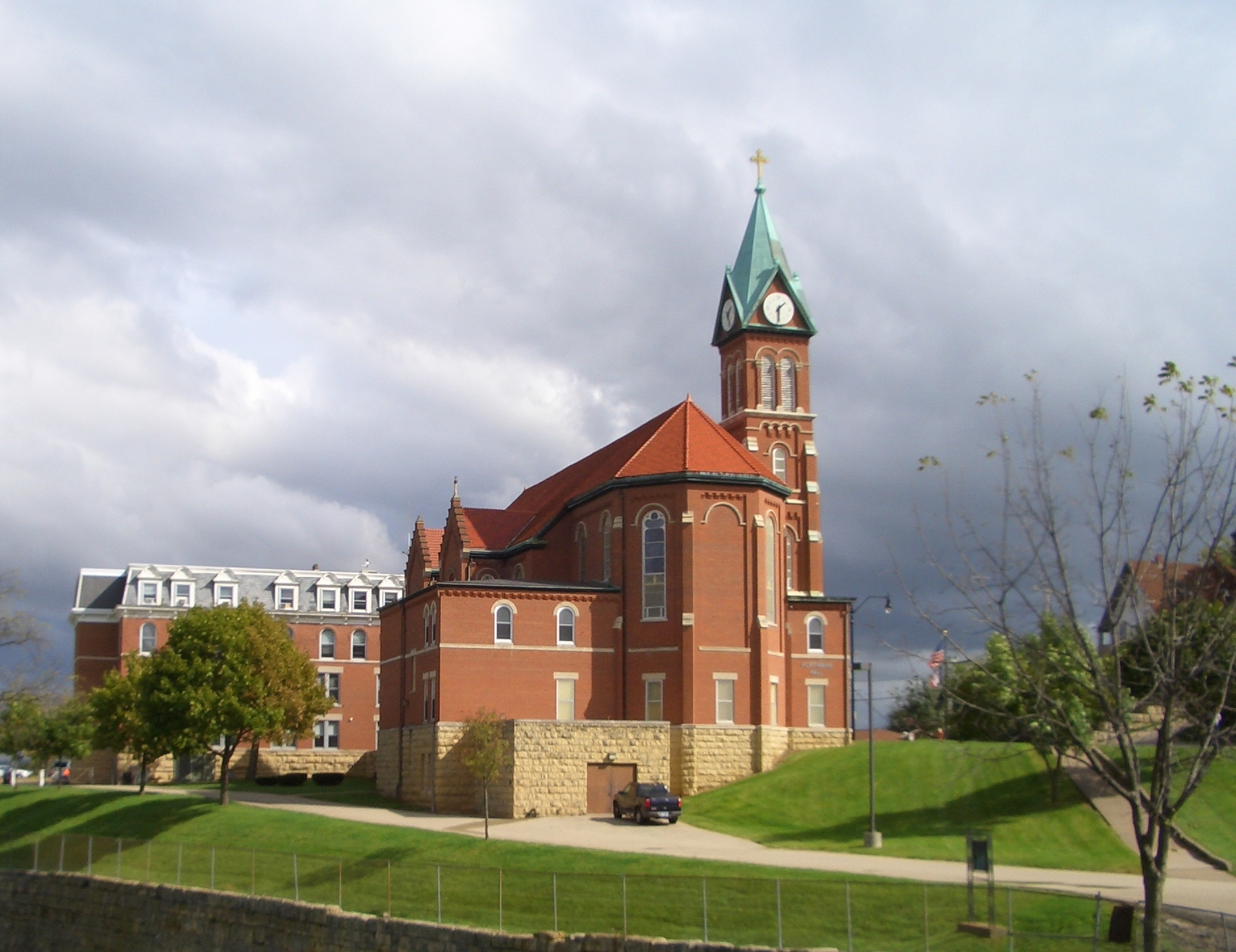
Hoffmann Hall with St. Joseph Adoration Chapel in foreground (2007)

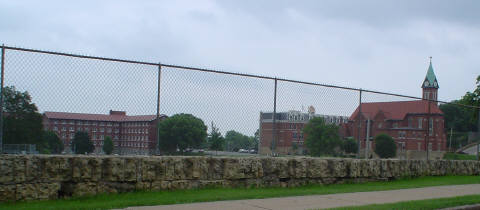
Beckman Hall (left) and Hoffmann Hall (right) (2004)

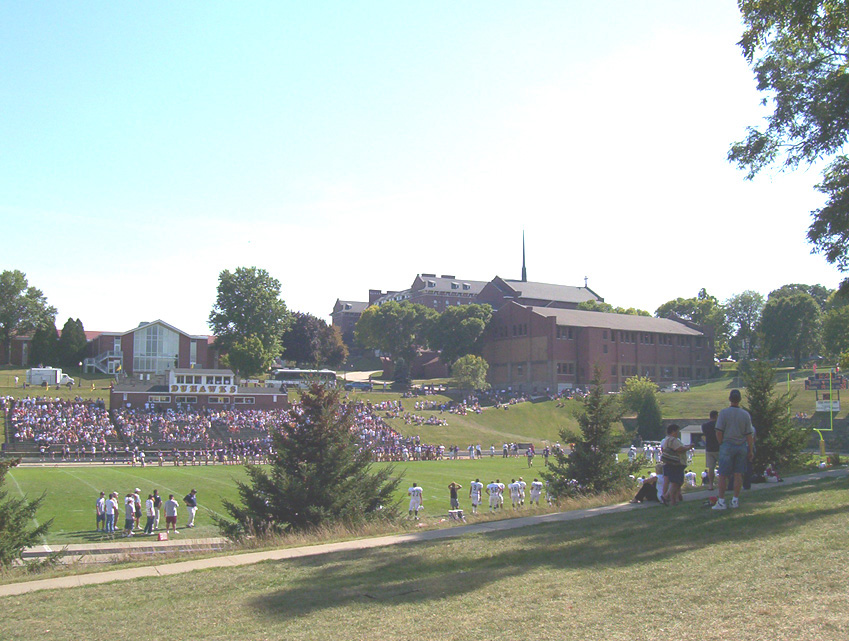
Rock Bowl Stadium (2004)

== Expansion ==
The college has been expanded over the years. The Alumni Campus Center was built in 1992, and added a new library in 2001. The Academic Resource Center contains a collection of approximately 355,000 items and 11,000 magazine subscriptions. In addition to its broad general collection, the library contains a rich heritage in its special collections of rare books, as well as the photographs and manuscripts in the Center for Dubuque History located in the lower level of the library. The library is also an official document depository for both the United States government and the state of Iowa. The previous library, Wahlert Memorial Library, was remodeled into classroom space.

Loras purchased Cox Street which runs through campus from the city of Dubuque for $50,000. The school has since shut the street down and replaced it with a pedestrian-friendly walk way to improve pedestrian safety and help upgrade the area aesthetically. In 2015, a school spirit shop, The Duhawk Shop, and Einstein Bros. Bagels opened at the corner of Loras Boulevard and the new Loras Parkway.

== St. Pius X Seminary ==
St. Pius X Seminary, located on the Loras College campus, is operated by the Archdiocese of Dubuque. The seminary prepares Minor (College) Seminarians for the priesthood, specifically preparing candidates for entrance into Major Seminary & Theological studies. Through Loras, the seminary provides full training in Philosophical studies, while giving students the necessary religious studies courses required for entrance into Major Seminary. The seminary has operated under various names and conditions at Loras College since 1839 until adopting its present name in 1954. St. Pius X has prepared many seminarians across Iowa and the surrounding states for the priesthood, counting over 30 bishops as alumni. Currently, the seminary is housed at the Vianney House and serves seminarians of the Archdiocese of Dubuque and the Diocese of Des Moines.

== Transportation ==
The college is located west of downtown Dubuque and served by The Jule transit system. The Blue Route, Orange Route and AM Commuter East Route stop on Loras Boulevard at the south edge of campus. Lamers Bus Lines stops outside Keane Hall providing intercity bus service towards Madison and Milwaukee.

== Athletics ==
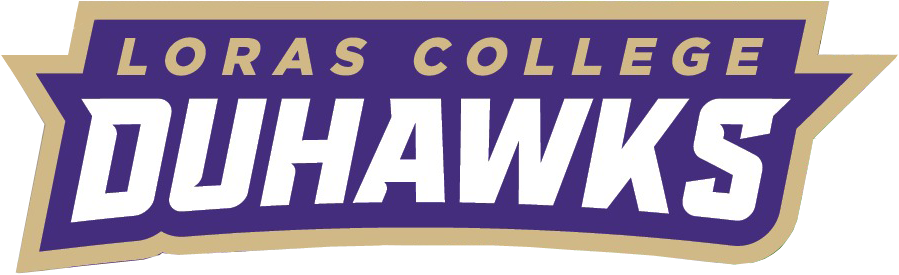
Loras Duhawks logo

Loras' athletic teams are known as the Duhawks, a name bestowed upon the football team by a Detroit Free Press scribe in 1924 converging Dubuque and Hawks. The school fields 23 men's and women's varsity teams in the NCAA Division III. They are a member of the American Rivers Conference (ARC). Loras’ colors are Purple, Rah Rah Gold, and Metallic Gold. The men's soccer team has advanced to the NCAA Division III Final Four five times since 2007, and once to the NCAA Division III Championship game in 2015. Denise Udelhofen ('90) serves as the director of athletics for the Duhawks and is assisted by head men's soccer coach and director of soccer operations, Dan Rothert ('96). Jim Naprstek ('13) serves as the director of athletic communications for the Duhawks after his hiring in March 2014.

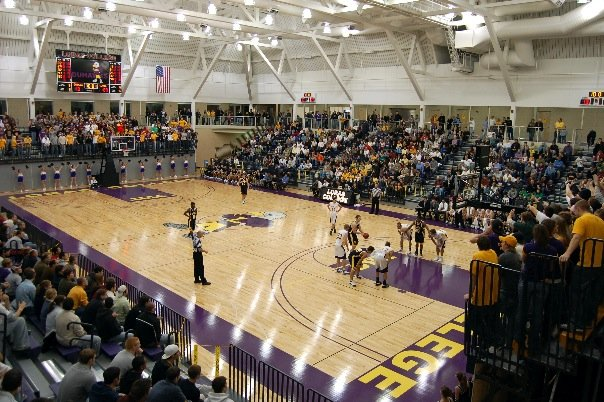
The Loras Athletic and Wellness Center (November 2007)

Sport	Season	Facilities
Baseball	Spring	Petrakis Park
Men's Basketball	Winter	AWC / Lillis Court
Women's Basketball	Winter	AWC / Lillis Court
Men's Golf	Fall, spring	The Meadows / Thunder Hills
Women's Golf	Fall, spring	The Meadows / Thunder Hills
Cross Country	Fall	Dubuque Soccer Complex
Football	Fall	Rock Bowl / Biere Field
Men's Soccer	Fall	Rock Bowl / Biere Field
Women's Soccer	Fall	Rock Bowl / Biere Field
Women's Lacrosse	Spring	Rock Bowl / Biere Field
Softball	Spring	Faber-Clark Field
Swimming & Diving	Winter	San Jose Pool
Men's Tennis	Fall, spring	Tucker Tennis Courts
Women's Tennis	Fall, spring	Tucker Tennis Courts
Track & Field	Winter, spring	Graber Sports Center / Rock Bowl
Men's Volleyball	Spring	Lillis Court
Women's Volleyball	Fall	Lillis Court
Wrestling	Winter	Graber Sports Complex / AWC

== Alumni and faculty ==
Loras College currently counts over 30 bishops as alumni. Notable graduates and faculty of Loras College include:

- Don Ameche, film actor, known to have attended Loras during the 1920s
- Bill Bartmann (class of 1972), executive in debt collection industry
- Rod Blum (class of 1977), former U.S. congressman from Iowa's 1st District, 2015–2019
- Robert Byrne - novelist and Billiard Congress of America Hall of Fame instructor of pool and carom billiards
- Red Faber, professional baseball pitcher, attended Loras in 1909. Faber set a college record by striking out 24 St. Ambrose University batters in a 1909 game. Played for 20 years with the Chicago White Sox. Faber-Clark Field on Loras’ lower campus bears his name today.
- Matthew Fox, Creation Spirituality founder, attended Loras in 1958. He was eventually ordained as a Dominican priest but then silenced for a year (forbidden to teach theology) by Cardinal Josef Ratzinger in 1988. In 1993, he was expelled from the Dominican order and effectively from the Catholic Church at the order of Ratzinger. In 1994, he became an Episcopal priest.
- Edward Grace (class of 1988), chief of law enforcement for the United States Fish and Wildlife Service. In 2016, he received the Samuel J. Heyman Service to America Medals for stopping an international rhino and elephant poaching / wildlife smuggling network.
- Greg Gumbel (class of 1967), CBS, ESPN and NBC sportscaster; first black American to serve as play-by-play broadcaster of a Super Bowl (Super Bowls XXXV and XXXVIIII); only broadcaster to serve as the host of both The NFL Today and the NFL on NBC pregame shows
- George Guthridge, award-winning speculative fiction author; taught English at Loras
- Chris Jans (class of 1991), head coach of the Mississippi State University men's basketball team
- Pam Jochum (class of 1992), Iowa state senator and first woman to hold the title of senate president
- Darin LaHood (class of 1990), current U.S. congressman from Illinois's 16th District, 2015 to present
- Bill Lipinski, former U.S. congressman from Illinois's 5th District (1983–1993) and 3rd District (1993–2005), attended 1956-1957
- Javier Manzano (class of 1998), freelance photographer, who received the Public Photo Prize Award at the 20th edition of the Bayeux Calvados-Normandy Awards held in Bayeux, France. In 2013, he received the Pulitzer Prize for feature photography for his photo of two rebel soldiers guarding their sniper's nest in Aleppo, Syria
- Mickey Marty (class of 1949), All-American college basketball player at Loras
- Michael M. Mihm (class of 1964), judge for the Central District of Illinois
- Thomas J. Miller (class of 1966), Iowa attorney general (1979–1990; 1994–2022) and the longest serving state attorney general in U.S. history
- Robert W. Pratt (class of 1969), judge for the US District Court for the Southern District of Iowa
- John Joseph Paul (class of 1939), Roman Catholic bishop of the Diocese of La Crosse in Wisconsin
- Kenneth M. Quinn (class of 1964), president of the World Food Prize Foundation (2000–2020), US ambassador to Cambodia, deputy assistant secretary of state as well as a member of the National Security Council staff
- David Rabe (class of 1962), playwright and screenwriter
- Raymond Roseliep (class of 1939), American poet famous for haiku
- Reverend Aloysius Schmitt, sailor on the USS Oklahoma during the Japanese attack on Pearl Harbor on December 7, 1941. First American chaplain killed during World War II, he was awarded a Silver Star for heroism.
- Dennis Schmitz, contemporary American poet
- Thomas P. Sullivan (class of 1951), trial lawyer, former U.S. attorney under President Jimmy Carter
- Thomas Tauke (class of 1972), U.S. congressman from Iowa, 1979–1991

== See also ==
- Roman Catholic Archdiocese of Dubuque
- St. Pius X Seminary (Dubuque, Iowa)
