= Cessianus =

Italian Roman Catholic saint

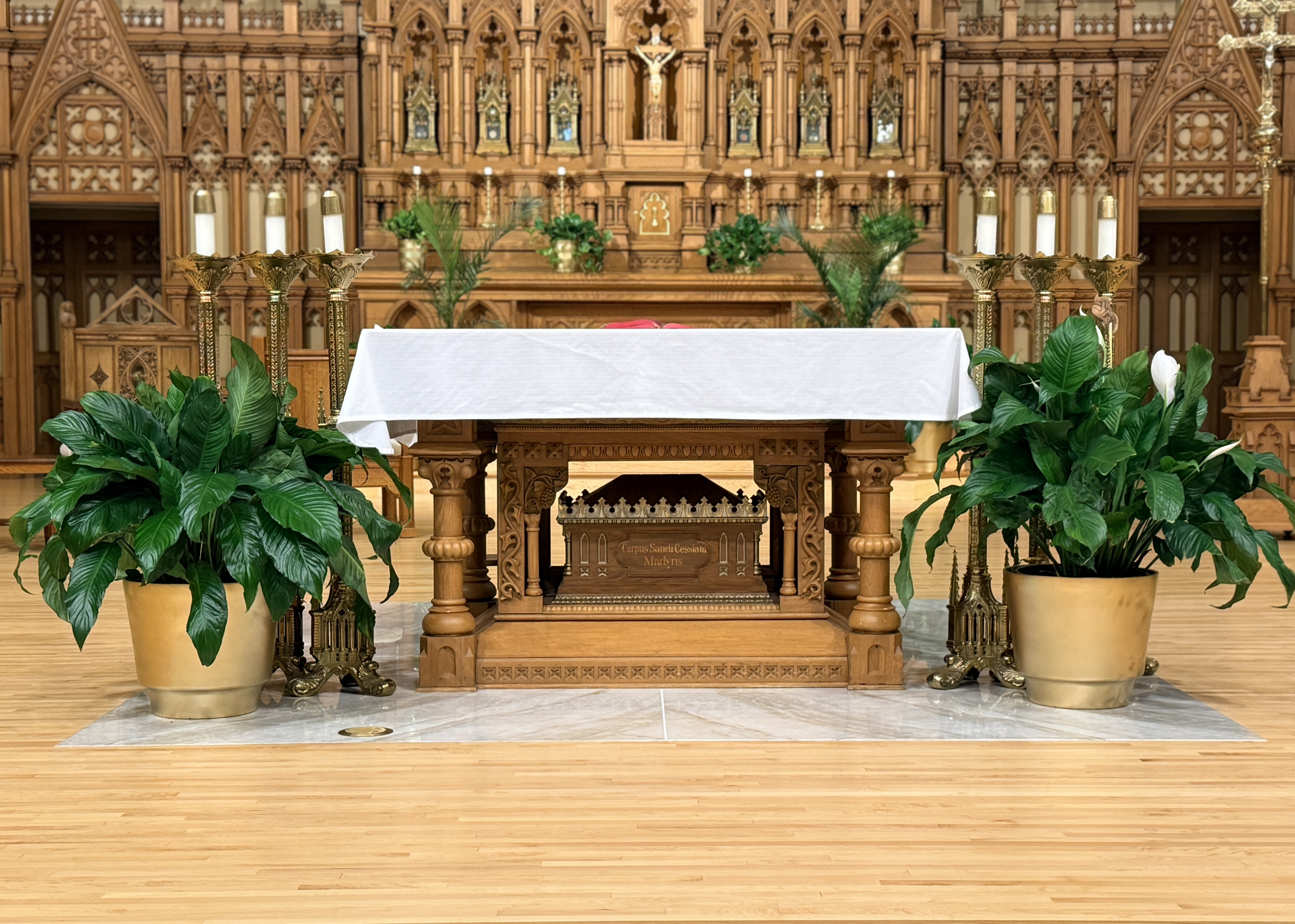
The main altar at St. Raphael's Cathedral, Dubuque, Iowa. Contained within the altar is the box containing the remains of Saint Cessianus.

Cessianus (c. 295 – 303) was an early Christian saint and martyr. At the age of eight, he was martyred during the persecutions of the Roman emperor Diocletian in 303.

== History ==
Pope Gregory XVI presented Bishop Mathias Loras with the remains of Cessianus in 1838. Loras brought the remains with him to the United States. The remains were placed within a side altar in the new St. Raphael's Cathedral, in Dubuque, Iowa.

After the completion of renovations in the mid-1980s, it was decided to place the remains of Cessianus under the new, freestanding main altar. On November 23, 1986, the wooden box containing the remains of Cessianus was installed during Mass in the altar where they currently reside.
