= Clement Smyth =

Irish-born bishop

His Excellency, The Right Reverend Timothy Clement Smyth OCSO
- Bishop of Dubuque
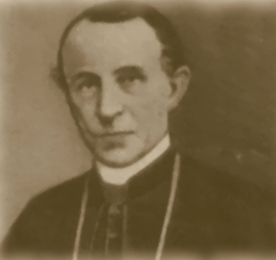
- Church: Catholic Church
- Appointed: January 9, 1857 (Coadjutor)
- In office: February 20, 1858 – September 22, 1865
- Predecessor: Mathias Loras
- Successor: John Hennessy
- Other posts: Prior of New Melleray (1849–1857); Titular Bishop of Thennesus; Coadjutor Bishop of Dubuque (1857–1858)

Orders
- Ordination: May 29, 1841 by Nicholas Foran
- Consecration: May 9, 1857 by Peter Richard Kenrick, Archbishop of St. Louis

Personal details
- Born: February 24, 1810 Finlea, County Clare, United Kingdom of Great Britain and Ireland
- Died: September 22, 1865 (aged 55) Dubuque, Iowa, United States

Timothy Clement Smyth OCSO (February 24, 1810 – September 22, 1865) was an Irish born 19th century bishop of the Catholic Church in the United States. He served as the second bishop of the Diocese of Dubuque in Iowa following the death of Bishop Mathias Loras in 1858. He previously served as coadjutor bishop of Dubuque from 1857 to 1858. Smyth was a member of the Order of Cistercians of the Strict Observance (Trappists),

== Biography ==
=== Early life ===
Timothy Smyth was born on February 24, 1810, in Finlea, County Clare, in Ireland to Cornelius Smyth and Mary Maloney. Timothy attended public schools in Finlea, then studied the classics at a school in Limerick. He then entered Trinity College. the Anglican college in Dublin, where he excelled in mathematics and music.

After finishing at Trinity, Smyth entered a community of teaching brothers, the Brothers of the Presentation. After six years with the brothers, he decided to entered the priesthood. In 1837, he entered the Trappist Mount Melleray Abbey near Cappoquin in Ireland. He professed religious vows to the Trappists in 1839.

=== Priesthood ===
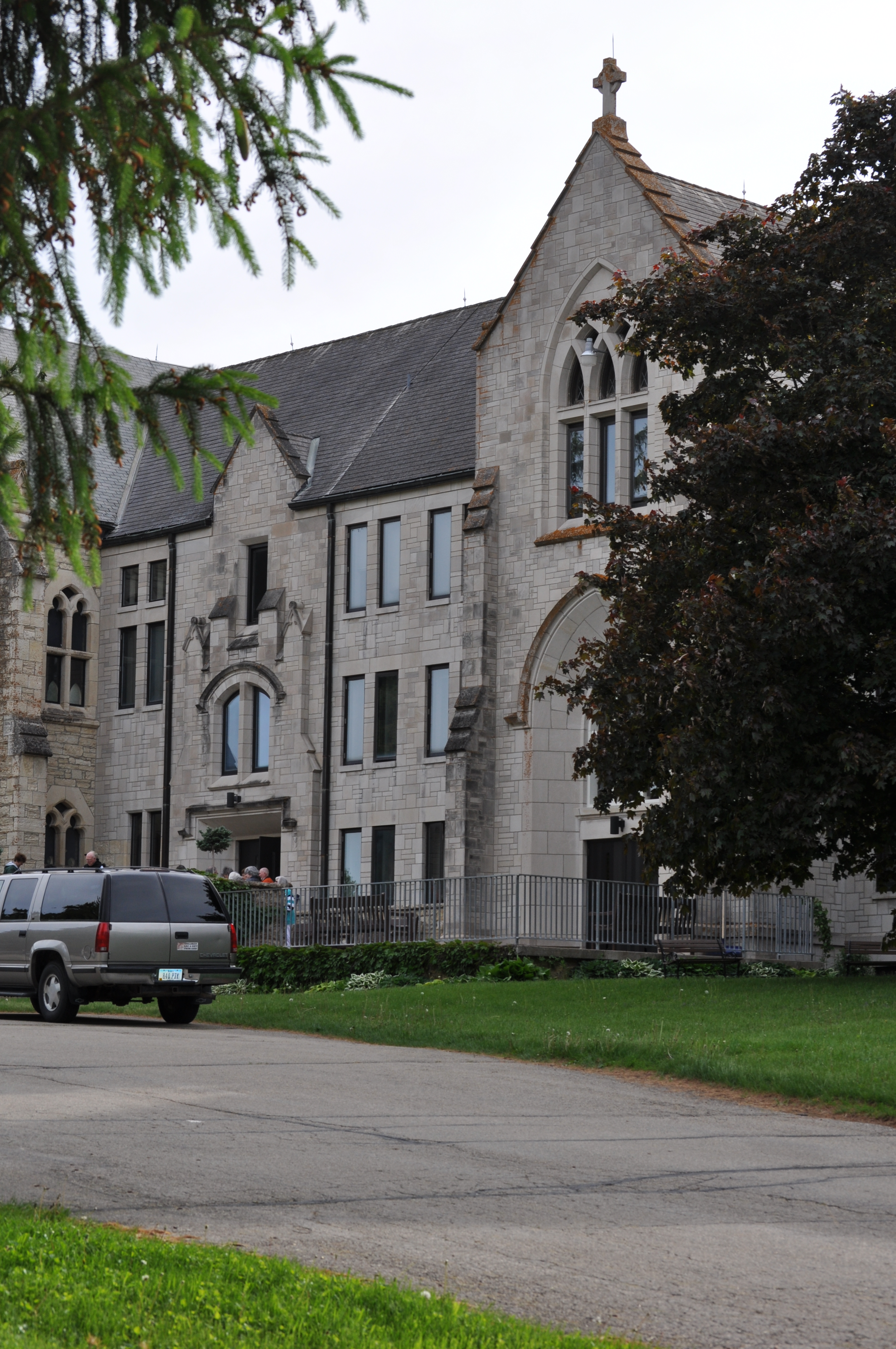
New Melleray Abbey, Dubuque, Iowa (2011)

Smyth was ordained a priest at Mount Melleray for the Trappists on May 29, 1841 by Bishop Nicholas Foran.After his ordination, Smyth founded a boys school near the abbey to counteract Protestant influences on Catholic boys. He then developed a second school for girls.

By early 1848, the Mount Melleray Abbey was in serious financial shape. The Great Famine in Ireland had greatly increased the relief the abbey was providing to starving peasants. The donations it received from the United States did not come close to covering these expenses. In late 1848, the abbey purchases farm property near Bedford, Pennsylvania to become a priory. Abbot Bruno Fitzpatrick then appointed Smyth to serve as the first prior of the new establishment. Considering himself more of a scholar than a pioneer, Smyth tried to refuse the assignment, but Fitzpatrick was firm.

Smyth arrived in New York City in February 1849 and made the winter trip to Bedford. Once there, he was informed by a Trappist monk that abbey's property was poor farmland, making it a untenable for the priory that had to grow its own food. Smyth then left Bedford for Philadelphia, Pennsylvania. While in Philadelphia, two Trappist monks from New Melleray informed Smyth that they had purchased new property near Kingston in present-day Ontario, for the priory. Smyth then went to Kingston, where he found the property to be less desirable than he was told; nevertheless, he started purchasing farm equipment. He then found out that Fitzpatrick decided the priory was going to be in Dubuque. Out of money, Smyth wrote to Fitzpatrick, resigning as prior and asking to come home to Ireland.

Fitzpatrick ordered Smyth to Dubuque to serve at the New Melleray Abbey outside of Dubuque. In 1854, the Trappists at New Melleray told Fitzpatrick that their prior was incompetent; they asked for Smyth to replace him.

During his short time as prior of New Melleray, Smyth was described by his fellow Trappists as being a good administrator who was cautious with money.Bishop Mathias Loras of the Diocese of Dubuque was Smyth's strongest supporter.

=== Coadjutor Bishop of Dubuque ===
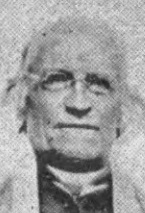
Bishop Loras (1897)

By 1855, Loras had suffered several mini-strokes and was partially blind and deaf, During the provincial council in St. Louis that year, he asked Archbishop Peter Kenrick to petition Pius IX to appoint a coadjutor bishop to help him, specifically Smyth. On January 9, 1857, Pope Pius IX named Smyth the titular bishop of Thennesus and coadjutor bishop of Dubuque. However, the papers from Rome did not arrive in Dubuque until April 1857. On May 9, 1857, Smyth was consecrated at the Cathedral of Saint Louis in St. Louis by Kenrick. John Henni, bishop of Milwaukee, and Anthony O'Regan, bishop of Chicago, served as co-consecrators. In July 1857, Smyth dedicated the new St. Raphael's Cathedral.

Later in 1857, Smyth was appointed as the temporary administrator of the Diocese of Chicago. O'Regan had left Chicago for Rome to ask Pius IX to relieve him as bishop of that diocese. He had angered the French-Canadian community in the city and was unable to cope with an economic downturn there.

For the six months that Loras administered the Diocese of Chicago, he also served coadjutor bishop. One of O'Regan's biggest problems was a French-Canadian priest, Reverend Charles Paschal Chiniquy, who had set up a schismatic church in Kankakee, Illinois. Smyth was now forced to deal with him.While in Dubuque, Smyth directed the construction of St. Raphael's Cathedral. Loras' health continued to decline, but he was well enough to hold the first mass in the new cathedral on December 25, 1857.

=== Bishop of Dubuque ===
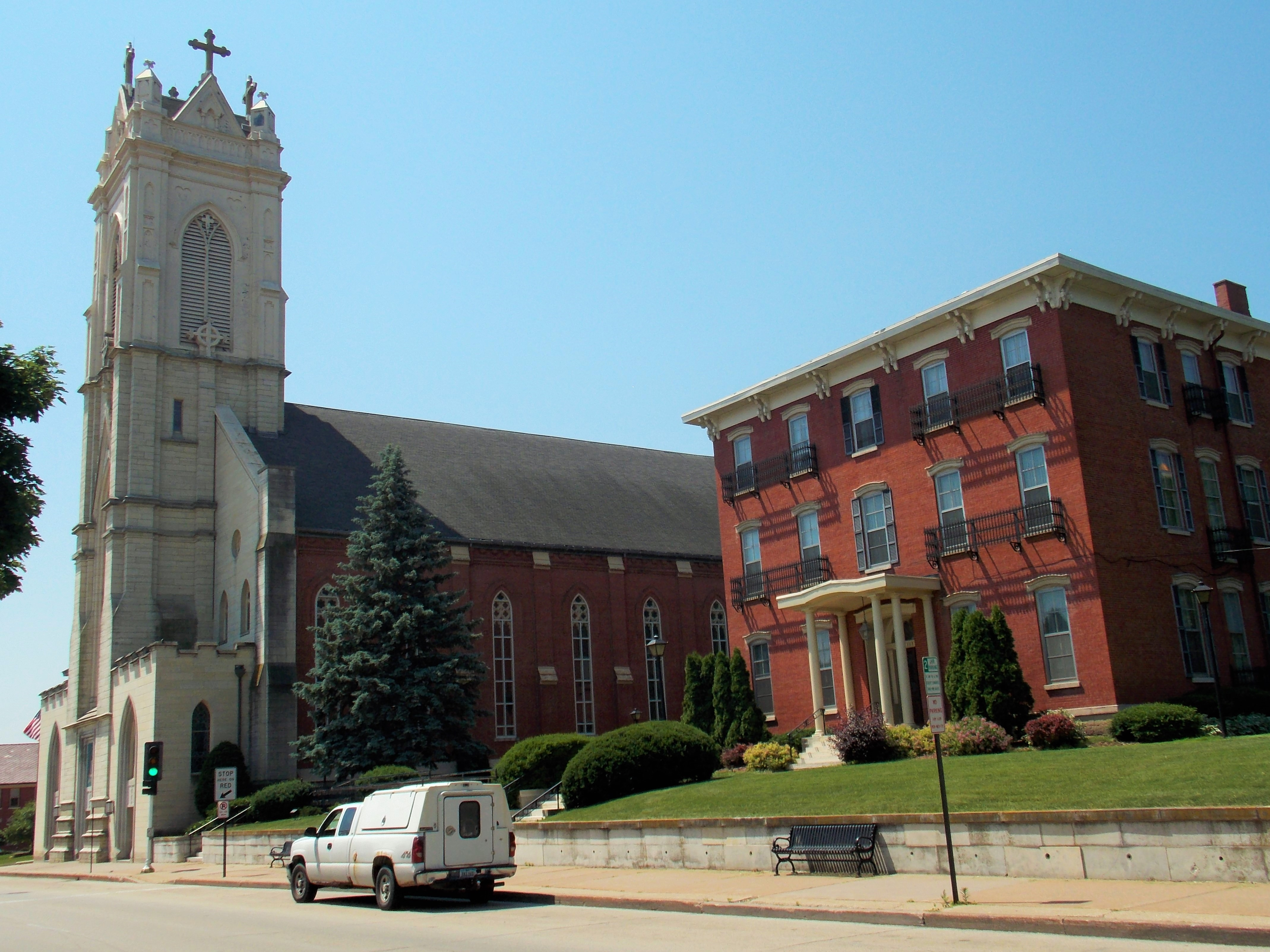
St. Raphael's Cathedral, Dubuque, Iowa (2016)

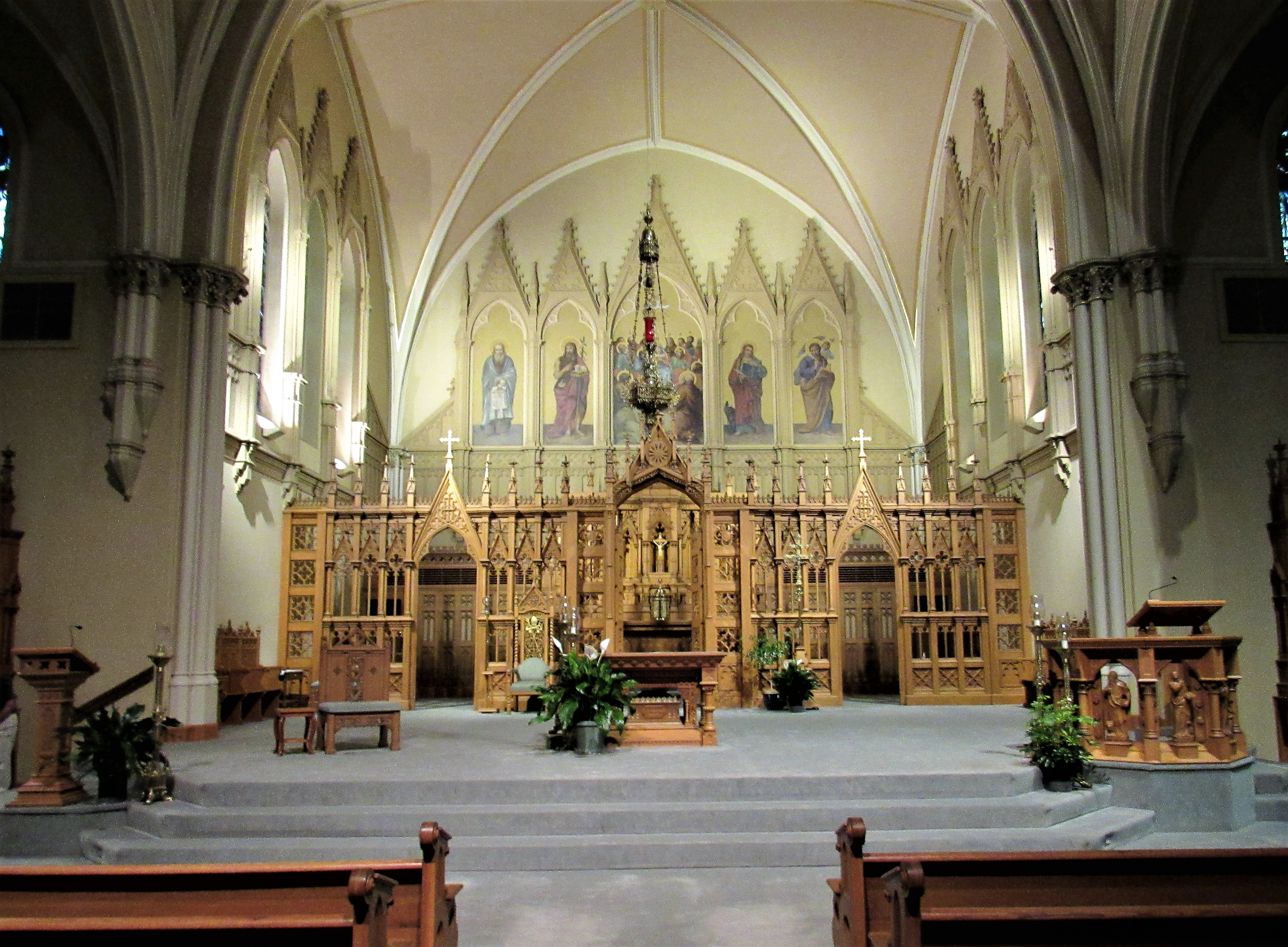
Nave, St. Raphael's Cathedral, Dubuque, Iowa (2018)

When Loras died on February 20, 1858, Smyth automatically succeeded him as the second bishop of Dubuque.

Near the end of Smyth's time in Chicago in 1858, he finally excommunicated Chiniquy and his followers. While leaving Chicago, he was greeted by gunshots. In the Fall of 1858, Dubuque started feeling the effects of the financial Panic of 1857. Having finished in Chicago, Smyth in December 1858 started a diocesan chapter of the St. Vincent de Paul Society and mobilized the resources of the diocese to assist the poor. In 1860, Smyth reopened St. Bernard's Seminary, which had closed after Loras's death. Also in 1860, Smyth brought the Sisters of Charity into the diocese to found a girls' school.

The American Civil War started in April 1861. While Smyth was able to finally dedicate St. Raphael's Cathedral in July 1861, the war delayed the building of churches and other capital projects in the diocese. During the war, Dubuque was a hotbed of sympathy for the Confederate States of America, especially among Irish Catholic immigrants. Smyth, a supporter of the federal government, tried to dampen these feelings. However, he flew an American flag from his rectory and visited Union Army troops stationed outside the city.

Smyth visited Ireland, France and Rome in 1862. While in Rome, he petitioned Pius IX to elevate New Melleray in Dubuque from a priory to an abbey. The pope consented and in 1863 Smyth consecrated Reverend Ephraim McDonnell as the first abbot of New Melleray.Also in1863, Smyth learned of the existence of the pro-Southern Knights of the Golden Circle in the diocese. He gave Catholics two weeks to withdraw from the organization or face automatic excommunication. During this period, Smyth recruited several priests from Ireland, primarily from All Hallows College in Dublin. This caused discontent among the French-born priests and many left the diocese.

At the end of the war, when US President Abraham Lincoln was assassinated in Washington D.C. in April 1865, Smyth preached a stinging sermon condemning the crime. That evening, Smyth lost his coach house, carriage and horses to arson. In response, local citizens, both Catholic and Protestant, built a new coach house and bought a new carriage and a pair of horses for him.One of Smyth's final projects was the creation of an orphanage in Dubuque to take care of children left without parents due to war. However, he was unable to complete it.

=== Death and legacy ===
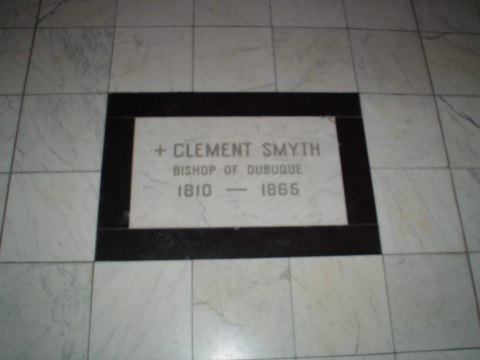
Bishop Smyth's tomb, St. Raphael's Cathedral (2005)

In poor health for several years, Smyth died in Dubuque at age 55 on September 22, 1865. His remains are interred in a tomb in the mortuary chapel of St. Raphael's Cathedral. When Loras died in 1858, there were 54,000 Catholics in the diocese. When Smyth died seven years later, the number had risen to 90,000.
