= Mount Saint Bernard Seminary and Barn =

- U.S. National Register of Historic Places
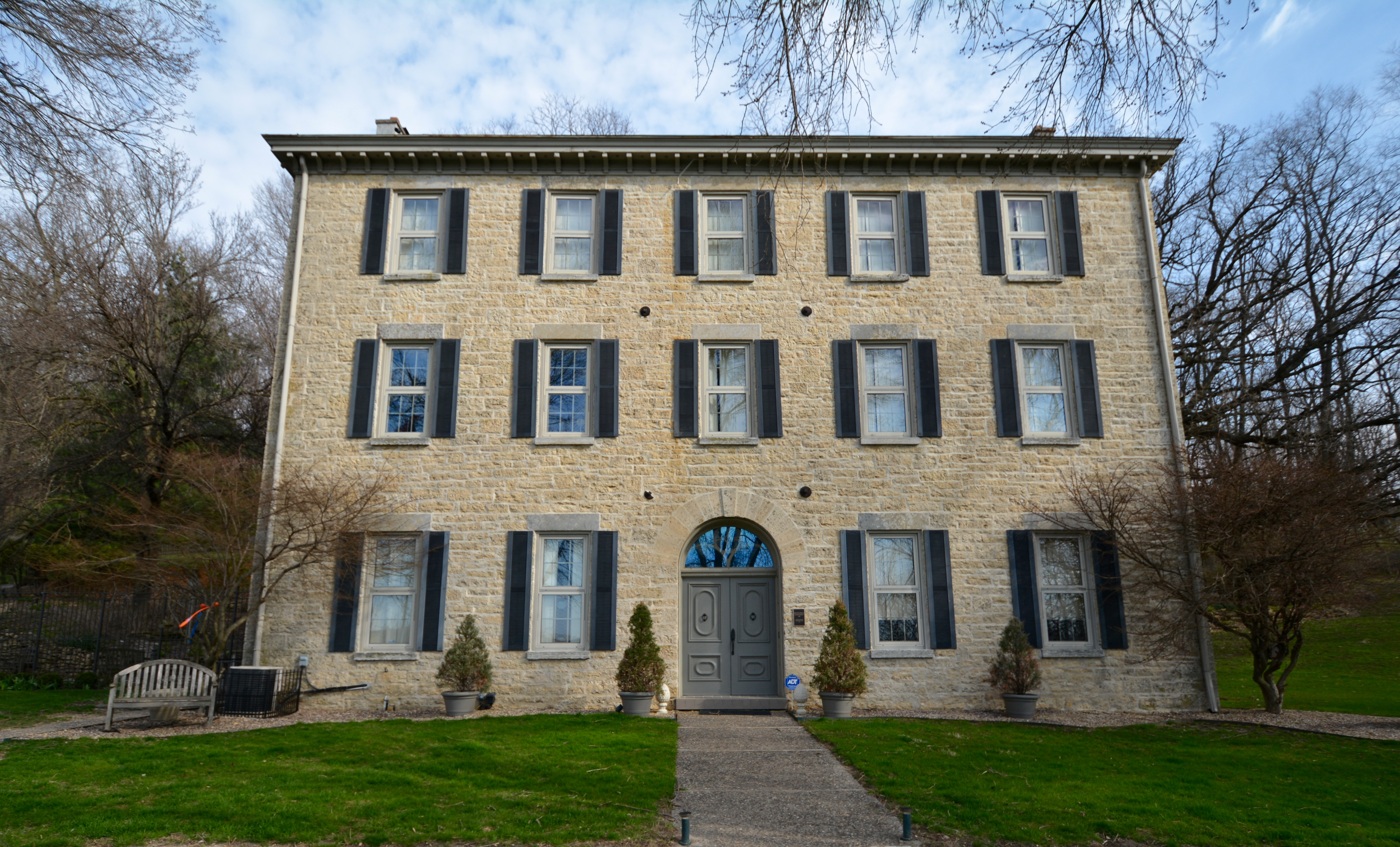
- The former seminary building.

- Location within Iowa Location within the United States
- Location: 10336 Military Rd. Dubuque, Iowa
- Coordinates: 42°26′36″N 90°41′37.3″W
- Area: less than one acre
- Built: 1851
- Architect: Hugh V. Gildea
- Architectural style: Greek Revival
- NRHP reference No.: 74000784
- Added to NRHP: November 5, 1974

Mount Saint Bernard Seminary and Barn are historic buildings located south of Dubuque, Iowa, United States. Bishop Mathias Loras, the first Bishop of Dubuque, founded the a Catholic institution of higher education in his residence in 1839. St. Raphael's Seminary, primarily for the education of priests, was probably the first college established in what would become the State of Iowa. The Brothers of Christian Instruction, a French teaching order recruited to the diocese of Loras, contributed their services to the seminary. The school was expanded in 1850 when he began the construction of three new buildings on Table Mound that he named Mount St. Bernard College and Seminary. The Rev. Andrew Trevis, who was later influential in the development of Sacred Heart Cathedral in Davenport, was the rector at the time the building was constructed. The three-story limestone combination Federal and Greek Revival structure was designed by local architect Hugh V. Gildea. It was built for $10,000, which was a lot of money for the diocese at that time. It is unknown when the frame, gable-roofed barn with a stone foundation was built.

A number of factors conspired to close Mount Saint Bernard, including economic conditions and a lack of clergy. Another factor was the Provincial Council of St. Louis decided in 1856 that one seminary in the St. Louis Province, of which the Diocese of Dubuque was a part, was enough. Loras, who spent a good deal of time here even working in the fields, decided to close the school. The students were sent to other seminaries while the clergy who taught here were placed in parishes. The archdiocese continued to maintain the buildings until 1900.

In 1937 a 75-foot (23 m) cross of galvanized steel was erected on the property in 1937 in honor the centennial of the Archdiocese of Dubuque. Beginning in 1963 it was illuminated with a turquoise colored light funded by the local Knights of Columbus.

The old seminary building has been converted into a residence. It and the barn were listed on the National Register of Historic Places in 1974.
