= John Hennessy (bishop) =

Irish-born prelate (1825–1900)

His Excellency, The Most Reverend John Hennessy, DD
- Archbishop of Dubuque
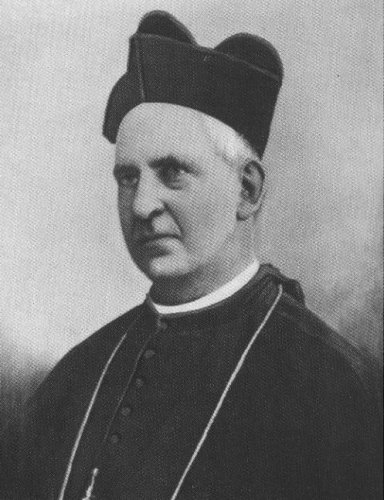
- Church: Catholic Church
- Appointed: April 24, 1866
- Term ended: March 4, 1900
- Predecessor: Clement Smyth
- Successor: John Joseph Keane
- Previous post: Bishop of Dubuque

Orders
- Ordination: November 1, 1850 by Peter Richard Kenrick
- Consecration: September 30, 1866 by Peter Richard Kenrick

Personal details
- Born: August 20, 1825 Bulgaden, County Limerick, United Kingdom of Great Britain and Ireland
- Died: March 4, 1900 (aged 74) Dubuque, Iowa, USA
- Motto: Messis multa (Many harvests)

Ordination history of John Hennessy
History
Episcopal consecration
- Consecrated by: Peter Richard Kenrick (St. Louis)
- Date: September 30, 1866
Episcopal succession
Bishops consecrated by John Hennessy as principal consecrator
- Thomas Mathias Lenihan: February 24, 1897

John Hennessy (August 20, 1825 – March 4, 1900) was a 19th-century Irish-born prelate of the Roman Catholic Church in the United States. He served as bishop and then as the first archbishop of the Archdiocese of Dubuque in Iowa from 1866 to 1900.

== Biography ==
=== Early life and education ===
John Hennessy was born August 20, 1825, in Bulgaden, County Limerick, in Ireland. He was the oldest of twelve children born to William and Mary (Meaney) Hennessy; three of the children died during infancy. The Hennessys were a poor family, living in a cottage with a dirt floor.

At age 12, John Hennessy decided to become a priest. Despite their poverty, the family gave him a good education from local teachers in Greek, Latin and English. Hennessy began his studies for the priesthood at All Hallows College in Dublin, which prepared seminarians to become missionaries. Given the lack of opportunities in Ireland, then in the midst of the Great Famine, he decided to go to the United States.

Hennessy arrived in St. Louis, Missouri, in early 1847. Archbishop Peter Kenrick initially placed him at the St. Vincent Seminary in Cape Girardeau, Missouri. When Kenrick opened an archdiocesan seminary in Carondelet, Missouri, in 1848, Hennessy was transferred there.

=== Ordination and ministry ===
Hennessy was ordained a priest in St. Louis for the Archdiocese of Saint Louis on November 1, 1850, by Kenrick. After his ordination, the archdiocese assigned Hennessy to parish work in New Madrid, Missouri. Working in a remote and sparsely populated area on the Mississippi River, Hennessy soon contracted an illness and was forced to return to St. Louis to recover. He later served at St. Peter's Parish in St. Louis.

Hennessy was soon serving as a professor and the vice-president of the Carondelet Seminary. He was name president of the seminary in 1857. Kenrick in 1858 sent Hennessy to Rome to deliver the decrees of the archdiocesan synod to Pope Pius IX for approval.

After spending a year in Rome, Kenrick appointed Hennessy in 1860 as pastor of St. Joseph's Parish in St. Joseph, Missouri. After the start of the American Civil War in 1861, Hennessy witness many bloody classes between sympathizers of the Confederate States of America and those supporting the federal government.

=== Bishop and Archbishop of Dubuque ===
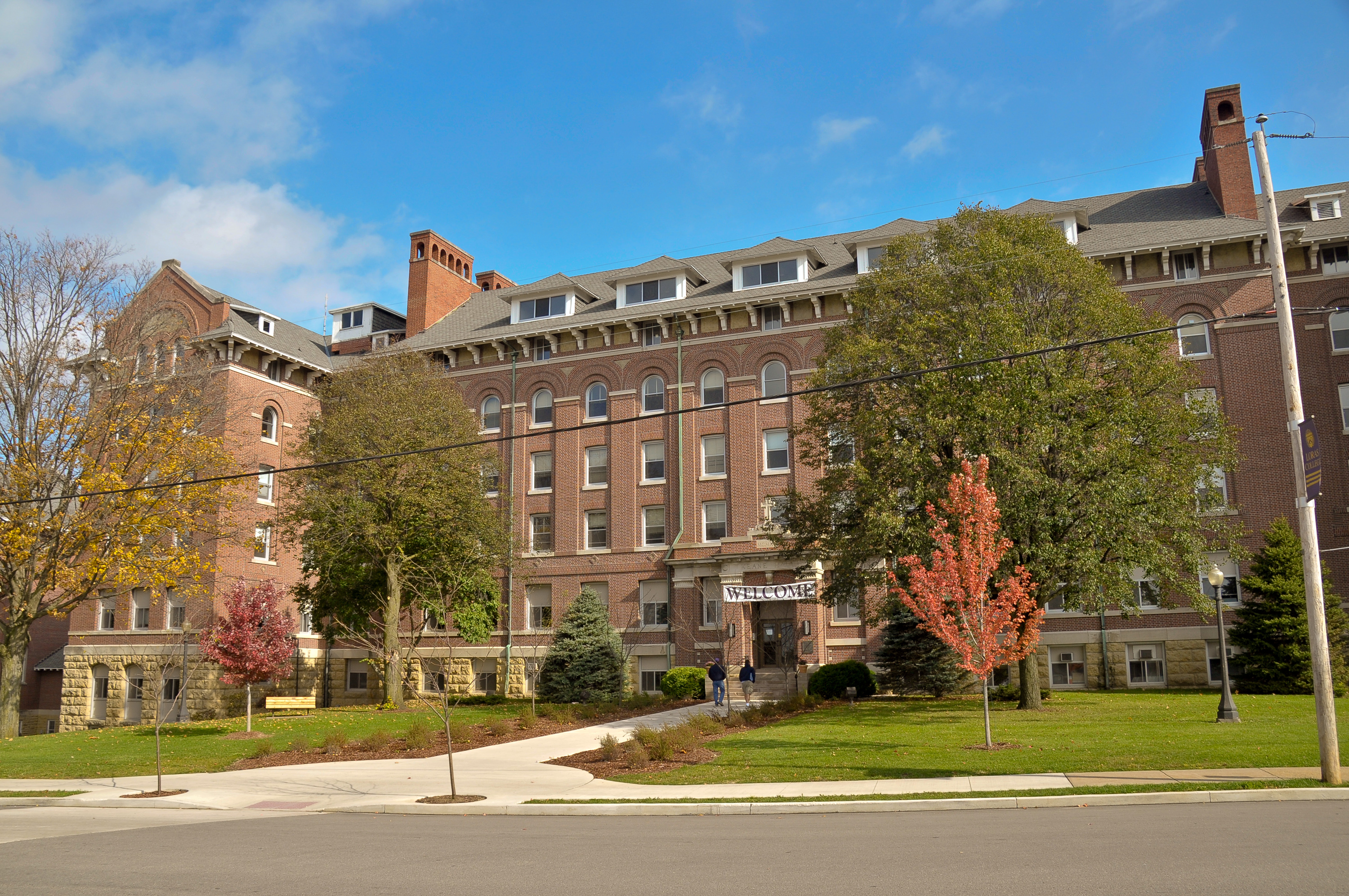
Loras University (former St. Joseph College), Dubuque, Iowa (2008)

Third Plenary Council of Baltimore, Baltimore, Maryland (1884)

On April 24, 1866, Pius IX appointed Hennessy as the third bishop of Dubuque. He was consecrated and installed bishop in St. Raphael's Cathedral in Dubuque on September 30, 1866, by Kenrick. The principal co-consecrators were Bishops John Martin Henni of Milwaukee and James Duggan of Chicago.Immediately after his consecration, in October 1866, Hennessy traveled to Baltimore, Maryland, to attend the Second Plenary Council, a meeting of all the Catholic bishops and archbishops in the United States.

After returning to Dubuque, Hennessy decided to replace St. Bernard's the diocesan seminary that had closed in 1858. However, unlike St. Bernard, Hennessy wanted his seminary to be in Dubuque.Contemporary accounts describe Hennessy as being temperamental and distant leader. However, some of his intimate friends described him as playful and funny.

In 1867, despite the need for teaching sisters in Dubuque, Hennessy approved the request of seven Sisters of Charity to relocate to Chicago, Illinois. A fervent opponent of public schools, Hennessy told Catholic families that they had to send their children to parish schools. At one point in 1869, he denied the sacraments to a Catholic man who was the principal of a public school.Some Catholics in the diocese opposed the expansion of Catholic schools for economic reasons, and because they felt it was an attack on public school education.

Hennessy attended the First Vatican Council in Rome from 1869 to 1870. While at the Council, he opposed the proposal for papal infallibility, believing that it bolstered arguments by some American Protestants that the pope was too powerful. In 1871, Hennessy got into another dispute with the Sisters of Charity. They had built St. Mary's Academy on a piece of diocesan property and Hennessy wanted them to buy it outright for $25,000. However, Sister M. Gonzaga McCloskey consulted a lawyer, who said the law barred the diocese from selling it. Two years later, an angry Hennessy demanded that she turn over an annuity she received from her brother to the diocese. When McCloskey refused, he ordered her to immediately leave Dubuque.

Hennessy opened St. Joseph's College in Dubuque in 1873. It is today Loras College. In 1874, at Hennessy's request, four members of the Presentation Sisters in Ireland arrived in the diocese. However, the diocese had made no preparations for their arrival, forcing the sisters to accept the hospitality of the Sisters of the Visitation. In 1878, at his suggestion, the Sisters of the Third Order of St. Francis of the Holy Family relocated from Iowa City to Dubuque to staff an orphanage for German Catholic children.

With the rapid population growth of Iowa during the middle of the 19th century, the bishops of Dubuque asked the Vatican to create a second diocese in the state. When Hennessy assumed office, he continued those requests. On May 8, 1881, Pope Leo XIII erected the new Diocese of Davenport. Davenport was chosen as a see city because of the income the new bishop would receive from the commercial properties owned by the Catholic Church. The Diocese of Dubuque now covered roughly the northern half of Iowa.

He also took a prominent role in the Third Plenary Council of Baltimore in 1884. He pushed for the creation of more Catholic schools around the nation, but opposed the creation of the Catholic University of America in Washington, D.C.

By the 1890s, Hennessy had become a very wealthy man. He owned numerous properties in downtown Dubuque and had substantial stock investments. On June 15, 1893, Leo XIII elevated the Diocese of Dubuque to the Archdiocese of Dubuque, with Hennessy as its first archbishop. The Ecclesial Province of Dubuque included the dioceses of Davenport Omaha, Wichita and Sioux Falls.

=== Death ===
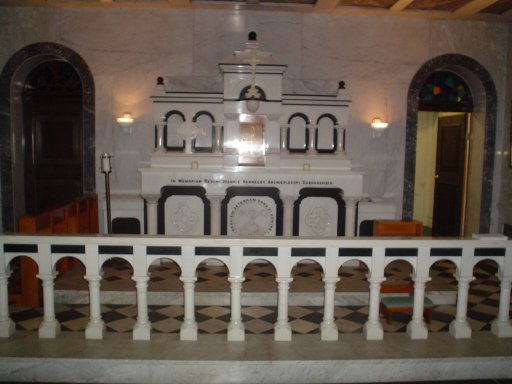
Mortuary Chapel, St. Raphael's Cathedral, Dubuque, Iowa (2005)

Hennessy died in Dubuque after a series of strokes on March 4, 1900. He left an personal estate of $1 million to several Catholic charities.

In the last years of his life, Hennessy requested that a mortuary chapel be built in St. Raphael's Cathedral. This new chapel was built in the basement of the cathedral and completed two years after his death. The archdiocese transferred the remains of Bishops Mathias Loras, Clement Smyth, and Hennessy to the new chapel.

=== Legacy ===
During his tenure as bishop and archbishop, Hennessy oversaw the expansion of the diocese even though this was a period of anti-Catholic sentiments in Dubuque. When Hennessey arrived in Dubuque, there were 27 priests, 30 churches, two schools and seven sisters. By 1891 there were 203 priests, 319 churches, 615 sisters, and over 135 parochial schools with 16,257 students.

Hennessy Hall, a sciences building at Loras College, was named after him.

== See also ==
- Catholic Church in the United States
- Historical list of the Catholic bishops of the United States
- List of the Catholic bishops of the United States
- Lists of patriarchs, archbishops, and bishops

Catholic Church titles
Preceded by None	Archbishop of Dubuque; 1893–1900	Succeeded by John Joseph Keane
Preceded by Clement Smyth	Bishop of Dubuque; 1866–1893	Succeeded by None
