= St. Raphael's Cathedral (Dubuque, Iowa) =

St. Raphael’s Cathedral
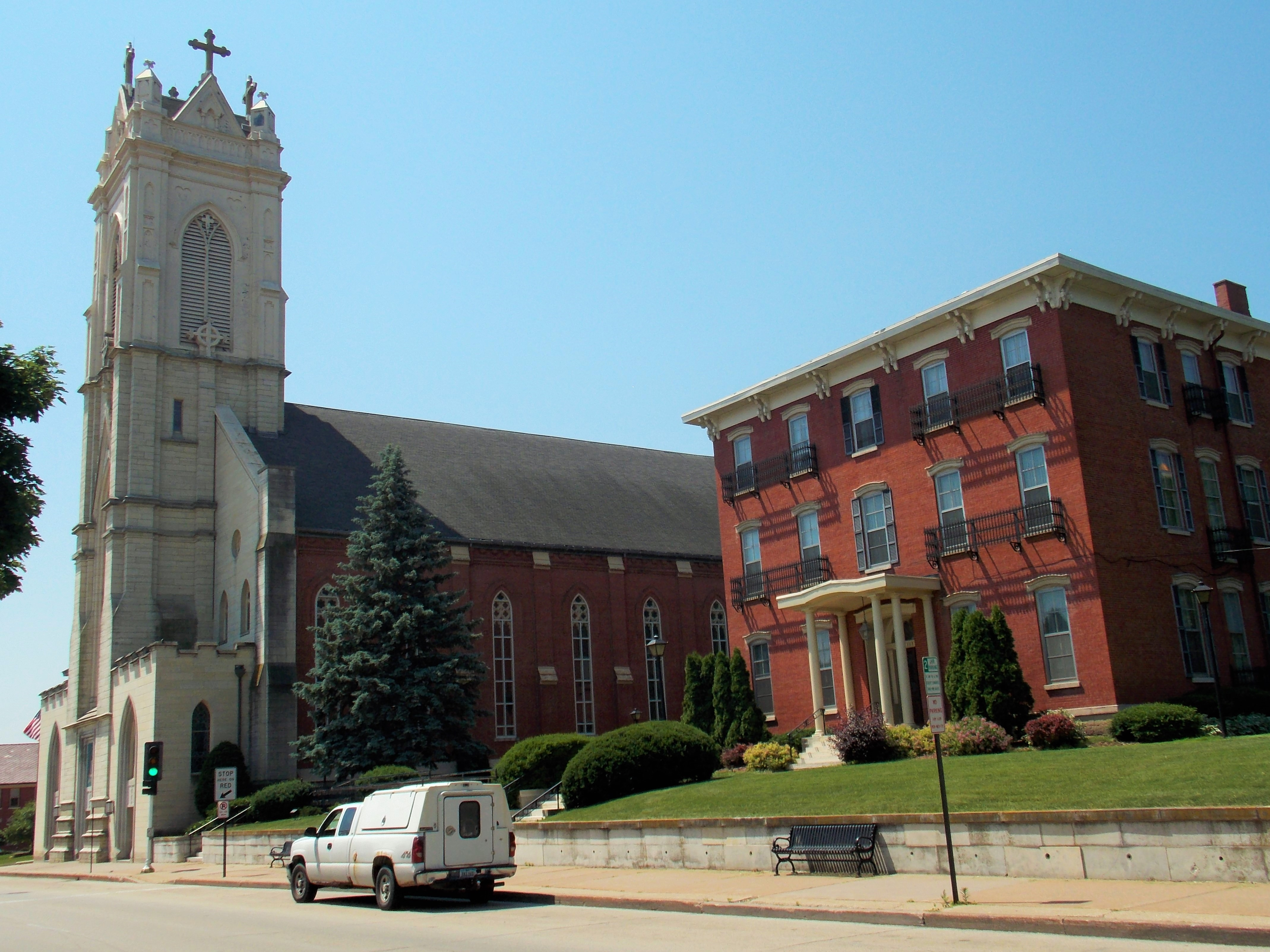
- Cathedral and rectory
- St. Raphael’s Cathedral
- Location: 231 Bluff St. Dubuque, Iowa
- Country: United States
- Denomination: Roman Catholic
- Website: cathedralstpats.org

History
- Status: Cathedral/Parish
- Founded: 1833 (parish)
- Dedication: Saint Raphael
- Dedicated: July 7, 1861

Architecture
- Functional status: Active
- Architect: John Mullany
- Style: Gothic Revival
- Groundbreaking: 1857
- Completed: 1861

Specifications
- Length: 160 ft (49 m)
- Width: 83 ft (25 m)
- Height: 85 ft (26 m) (church); 130 ft (40 m) (tower)
- Materials: Brick; Limestone

Administration
- Archdiocese: Dubuque

Clergy
- Archbishop: Most Rev. Thomas Robert Zinkula
- Rector: Rev. Dennis Quint
- St. Raphael’s Cathedral, Rectory, Convent, and School
- U.S. Historic district – Contributing property
- Location within Iowa Location within the United States
- Coordinates: 42°29′41.18″N 90°40′2.52″W
- Built: 1870 (rectory); 1880s (convent); 1904 (school)
- Architectural style: Italianate (rectory); Second Empire (convent); Neoclassical (school)
- Part of: Cathedral Historic District (Dubuque, Iowa) (ID85002501)
- Added to NRHP: September 25, 1985

St. Raphael's Cathedral is a Roman Catholic cathedral in the Archdiocese of Dubuque in Dubuque, Iowa in the United States. The parish is the oldest congregation of any Christian denomination in the state of Iowa. The cathedral church, rectory, former convent, and former parochial school building are contributing properties in the Cathedral Historic District on the National Register of Historic Places.

== History ==
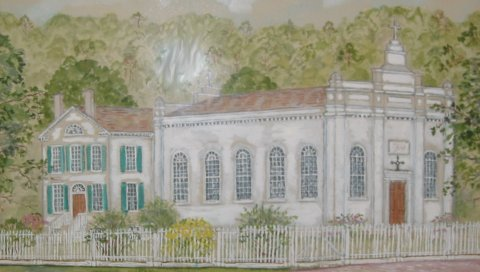
First St. Raphael's Cathedral

=== Origins ===
In the early 1830s, the US Government opened present-day Iowa, then part of the Michigan Territory, for settlement. At that time, there were no Catholic churches in the town, which was then under the jurisdiction of the Diocese of Saint Louis.

In July 1833, Bishop Joseph Rosati sent Reverend Charles Felix Van Quickenborne, a Belgian Jesuit priest, from St. Louis, Missouri, to Dubuque. He celebrated the first mass in the town in the home of Patrick Quigley in Dubuque. However, Quickenborne was called back to Missouri. The Catholics in Dubuque then sent a petition to Rosati asking for the formation of a parish. In response, Rosati sent Reverend Charles Francis Fitzmaurice to Dubuque in 1834 to start a parish and build a church. However, he died of cholera in early 1835.

In late 1835, Rosati assigned Reverend Samuel Charles Mazzuchelli to the parish. Dedicating the parish to the archangel Raphael, he drew up plans for a church building made of stone. Under his guidance, the first St. Raphael's Church was completed, the first Catholic church in Iowa.

In 1837, Pope Gregory XVI erected the Diocese of Dubuque and appointed Reverend Mathias Loras as its first bishop. St. Raphael's Church was designated as the cathedral for the new diocese. That same year, the pope presented Loras with a relic, the bones of Cessianus, a second-century Roman martyr and saint. This relic was then installed at the cathedral.

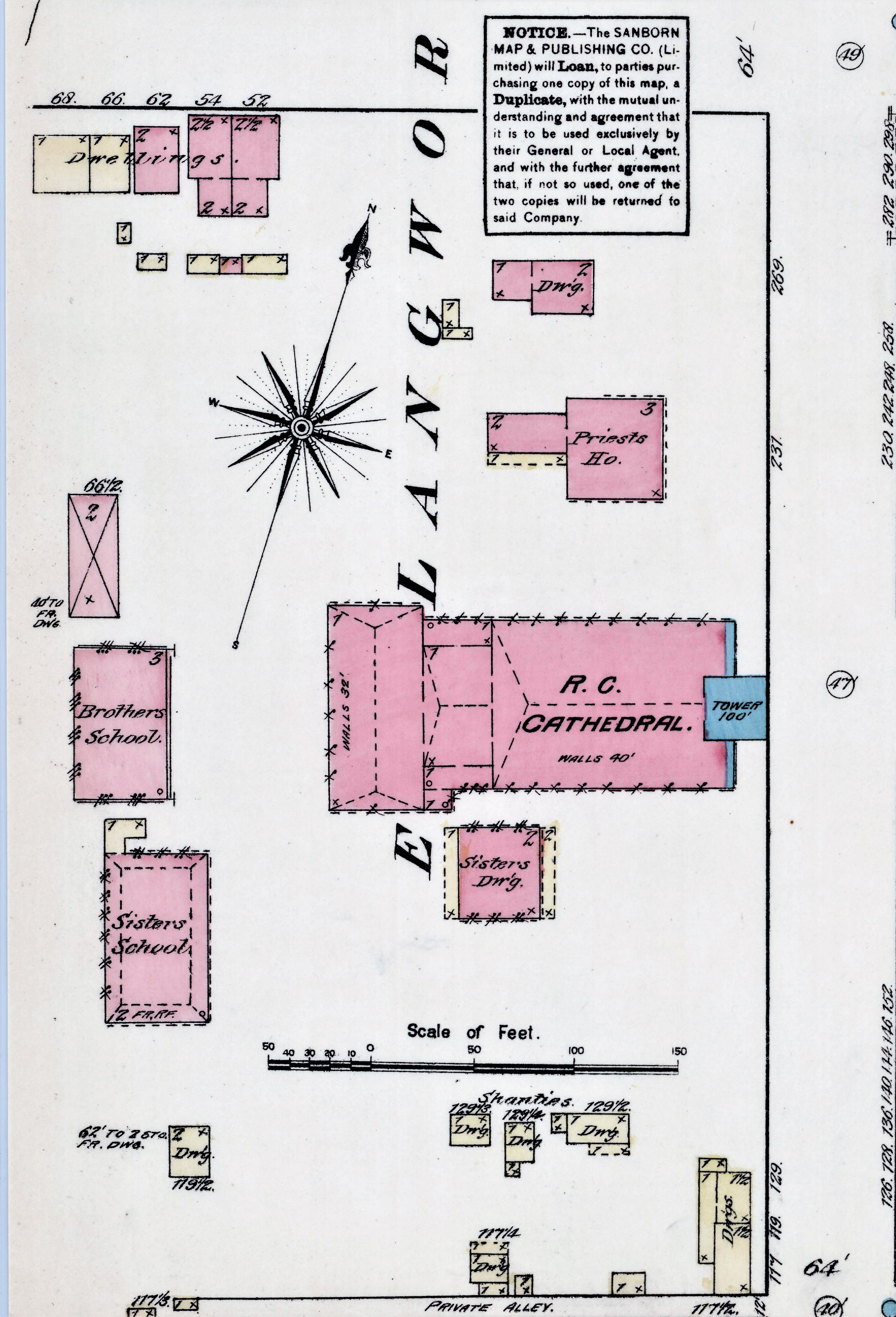
1884 map of St. Raphael's campus. The Sisters' and Brothers' Schools are on the left., the cathedral in the center.

=== Growth and expansion ===
During the early 1840's, large numbers of German settlers and Irish workers moved into Iowa. By 1845, St. Raphael's Cathedral was becoming overcrowded during Sunday masses. At this point, Loras began planning to build a new cathedral in the downtown area. However, the growth of the business district in that area plus a lack of funding forced him to postpone these plans.

To alleviate the crowding at St. Raphael's and provide the German Catholics with services in their own language, Loras in 1849 approved the formation of Holy Trinity, a German national parish in Dubuque. The parish later became St. Mary's.

In 1853, to further ease the overcrowding at St. Raphael's, Loras erected St. Patrick's mission church in Dubuque to serve Irish families. Loras made it a mission of St. Raphael's so he would not lose the income needed to build a new cathedral. This created problems between him and the local Irish community.

=== The present building ===
After opening St. Patrick's, Loras realized that he should try again to build the new cathedral. He purchase land near the current cathedral and on July 5, 1857, laid the cornerstone for the new St. Raphael's Cathedral. Loras hired John Mullany, a local architect, to design the building. Mullany originally wanted to design a Romanesque Revival cathedral, but the national Panic of 1857 made that financially unfeasible. He instead planned a Gothic Revival, patterned after Magdalen College in Oxford, England. On December 25, 1857, a sick Loras was able to celebrate the first mass in the partially completed cathedral.

Construction on the cathedral was finished in 1861, with the planned tower put off until a later date. Bishop Clement Smyth, the second bishop of Dubuque, dedicated St. Raphael's Cathedral on July 7, 1861. Mazzuchelli assisted with the dedication.

The cathedral's tower was finally completed in November 1876. Mullany had originally planned for a stone tower. However, the contractor soon discovered that the pilings were too weak to support a stone structure. The archdiocese opted instead for a tower made of wood and tin. In 1882, the diocese constructed Blessed Sacrament Chapel, a large structure at the back of the cathedral. It was designed by Dubuque architect Fridolin Heer. Since the new chapel obscured the three stained glass windows in the cathedral above the main altar, the contractor relocated them to the chapel.

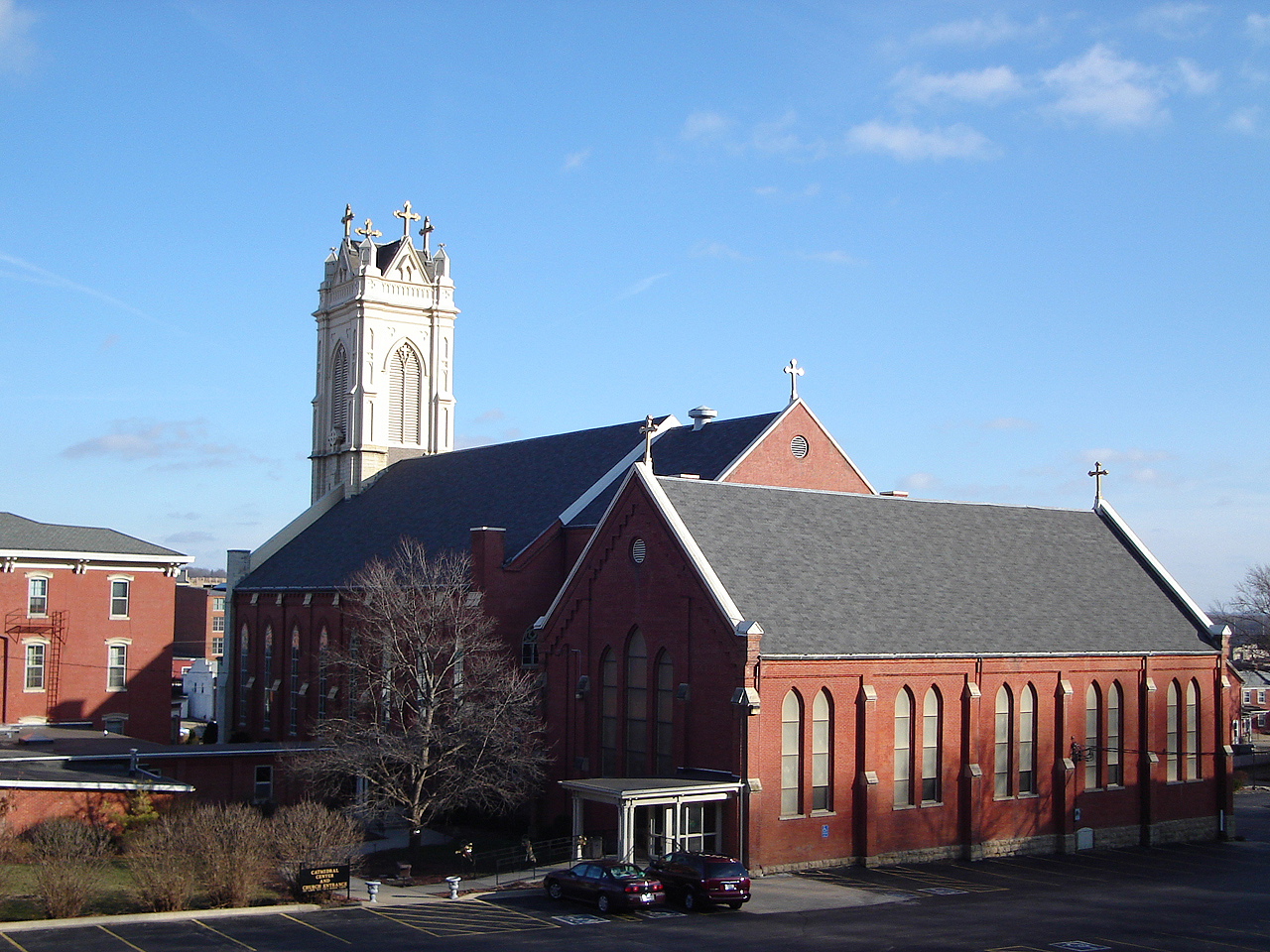
Former Blessed Sacrament Chapel (2007)

In 1886, St. Raphael's Cathedral underwent its first major renovation, designed by the Chicago architect J.J. Egan. Contractors installed new iron vaulting and lowered the column's capitals by 4 feet (1.2 m). They replastered the interior, installed a new gallery in the rear of the church and cut a large arch into the tower to allow light from the lancet window. The archdiocese also ordered new stations of the cross from Germany Bishop John Hennessy rededicated the cathedral on November 21, 1886. New stained glass windows, whose openings in the nave had been lowered 2 feet (0.61 m), were imported from London and installed in 1889.

In 1902, the archdiocese constructed a mortuary chapel in the lower level of the cathedral. It contains several buried vaults holding the remains of several bishops and archbishops of Dubuque. The altar and communion rail are made of Italian marble.

The archdiocese in 1944 expanded the main entrance and replaced two outside staircases on the sides of the cathedral with interior ones. An elevator was added to make the building more handicapped accessible. In the wake of liturgical reforms from the Second Vatican Council, the chancel was altered. Another change from the Council was the use of the vernacular, or local language, instead of Latin in masses. Archbishop James Byrne celebrated the first mass in English at St. Raphael's.

During the production of the 1978 film F.I.S.T, starring Sylvester Stallone, the filmmakers used the interior of Blessed Sacrament Chapel for some scenes.

=== 1986 renovations ===
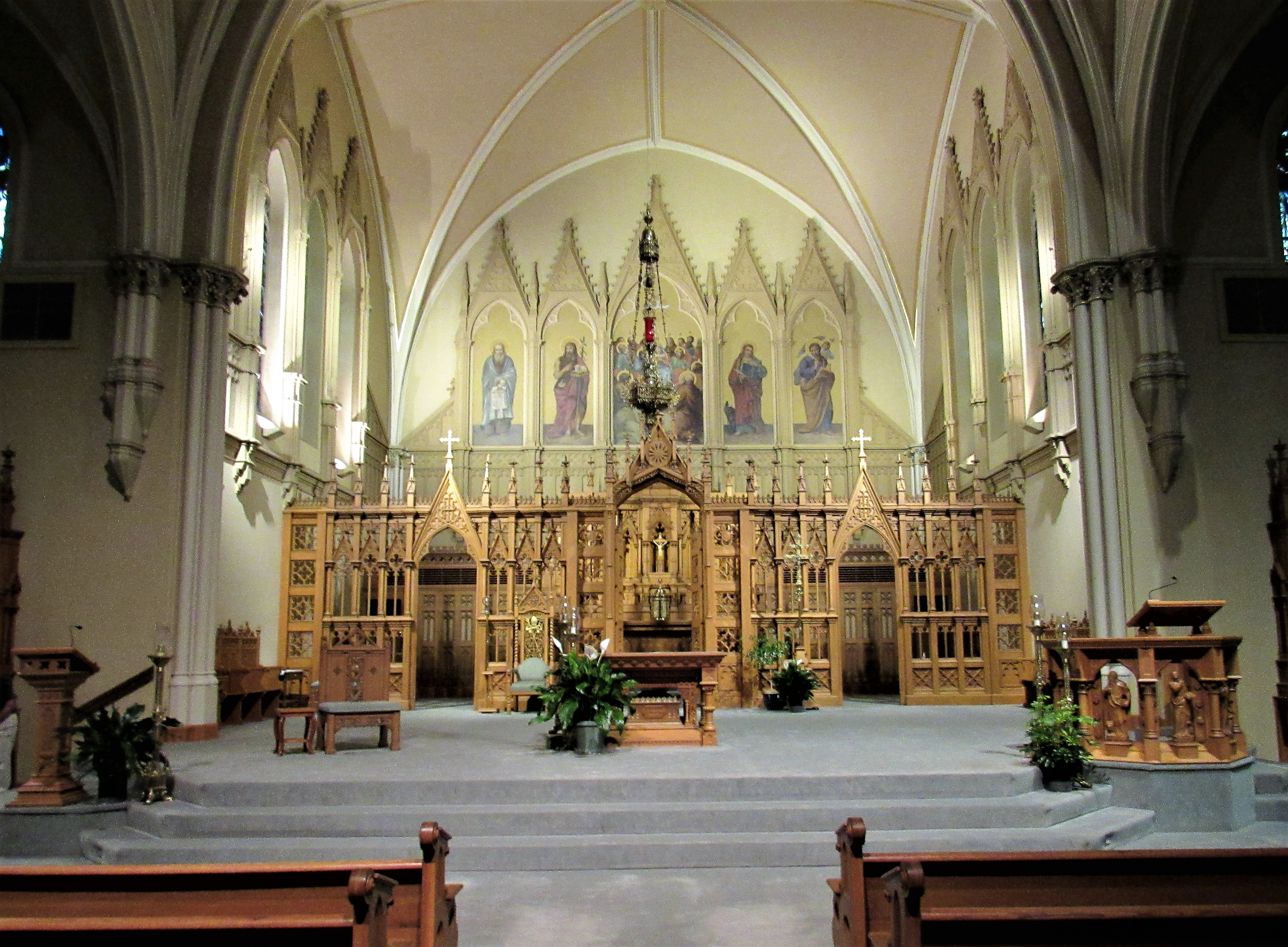
Altar area showing the 1986 renovations (2018)

In 1986, the most extensive renovation in years was done to the church. At the time, it had been more than 50 years since the renovation. Also, the parish wanted to make some updates to the design which coincided with certain architectural and liturgical trends that were emerging in the Church at the time.

In the summer and fall of 1986, St. Raphael underwent its most significant renovations since 1886. The old Eucharistic Chapel was deconsecrated and a new one created by building a wooden screen between the original high altar and the new ad populum-oriented altar. Portions of the original communion rail were used in its construction. The original ad absidem altar was left intact because of its historical significance. The archdiocese installed a new tabernacle on the altar.

Because they were a fire hazard, the dividers between the pews were removed. The layers of varnish applied over the years to the woodwork were also removed, which was refinished to allow the light oak to show. The walls were painted a lighter color, and a new indirect lighting system was installed. A light green carpet was added and used throughout the building. Part of the Pietà altar was refurbished and installed in the sanctuary as the new main altar, replacing an early 1970s altar.

The sanctuary platform was extended so that more of the liturgical functions associated with the mass took place closer to the congregation. The existing cathedra was replaced with a smaller, simpler cathedra that could be move. It allowed the archbishop to directly face the congregation during mass.

By November 1986 the renovations were complete. The remains of Cessianus were installed in the main altar during the first mass held in the renovated Cathedral on November 23, 1986, celebrated by Archbishop Daniel Kucera. This followed an early Catholic tradition of celebrating mass over the tombs of saints and martyrs.

=== Twenty-first century ===
The archdiocese added a pool to the baptismal font in 2005 for the immersion baptism of older children and adults.

During a reorganization of parishes by Archbishop Jerome Hanus in 2010, St. Raphael and St. Patrick Parishes were linked. They share the same pastor and work closely on various programs.

In April 2025, a $10 million renovation of the cathedral campus was completed. The nearly four year-long project included an interior renovation of the cathedral as well improvements to the exterior, parking lot and new landscaping. It was paid for by a $1.8 million grant from the state of Iowa and donations from across the archdiocese.

== Architecture ==
=== Exterior ===
St. Raphael's is a brick structure built on a raised basement and a stone foundation. .

The original cathedral plans called for a 243-foot (74 m) tall tower and spire, however after construction began to complete it, cracks started to form on the front wall. The lower part of its 130-foot (40 m) central tower is limestone. Instead of stone, the bell-chamber at the top of the tower is a wood structure that is encased in galvanized iron painted to resemble stone. Four tall pointed pinacles (no longer extant) were placed at the corners. New entrances were cut into the sides of the tower and the main facade of the church building was covered with Portland cement and made to look like stone.

=== Interior ===
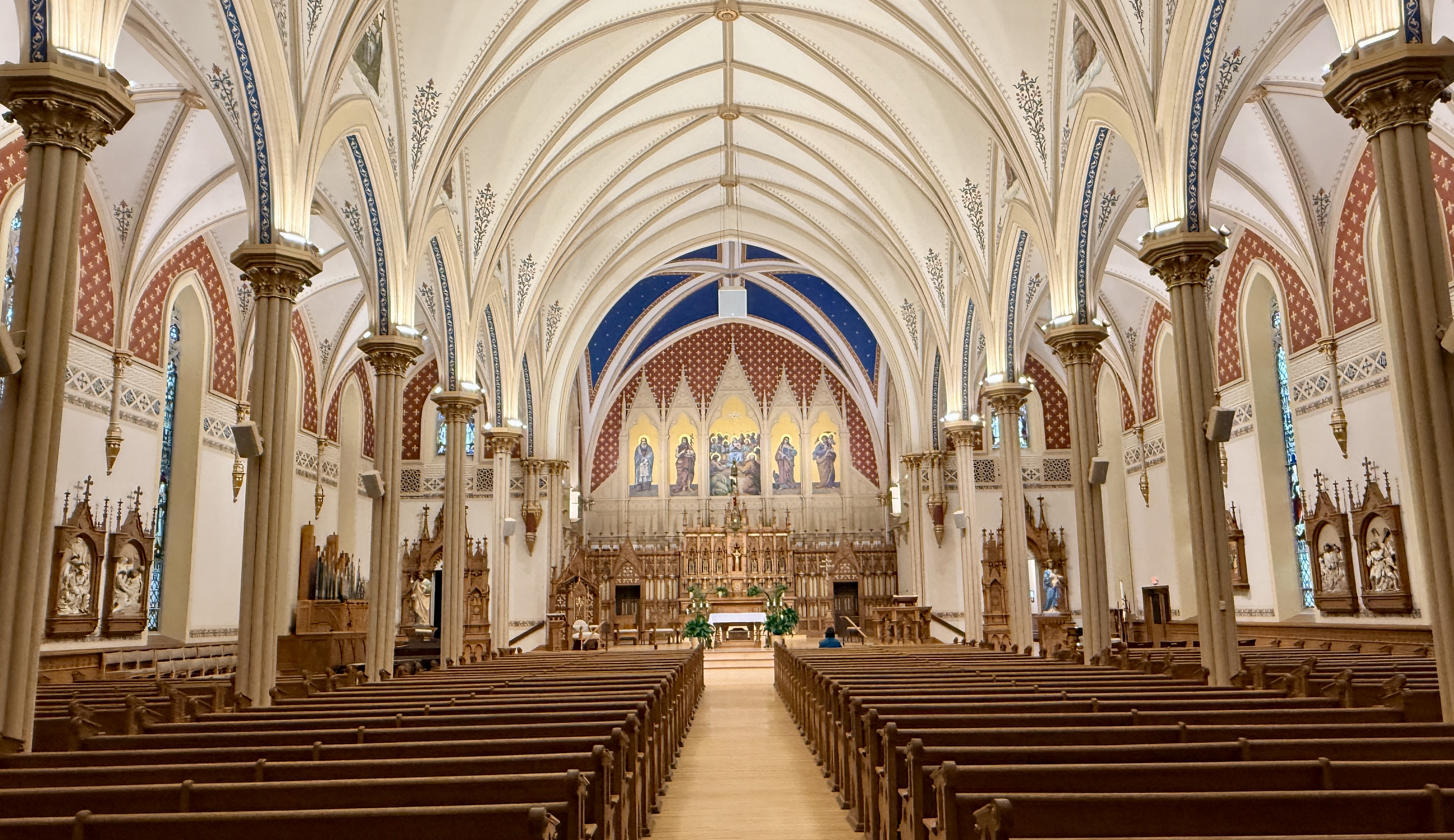
Cathedral interior (2026)

The three naves on the interior are divided by fourteen clustered wooden columns. The side elevations are seven bays in length. They are divided by buttresses and each has a lancet window in the center. Smaller windows are located over the side altars and there are three windows on either side of the chancel. Above the main entrance is a large lancet window. It was part of the original plan for the building. Even though the design of the cathedral was changed several times, the window was left as originally designed in each plan. The upper part of the window is visible from inside the church, while the lower part is hidden behind the organ.

The frescos in the church were completed at this time by Luigi Gregori, artist in residence and professor at the University of Notre Dame who had previously worked at the Vatican, and his son Constantine.

== Pipe organ ==
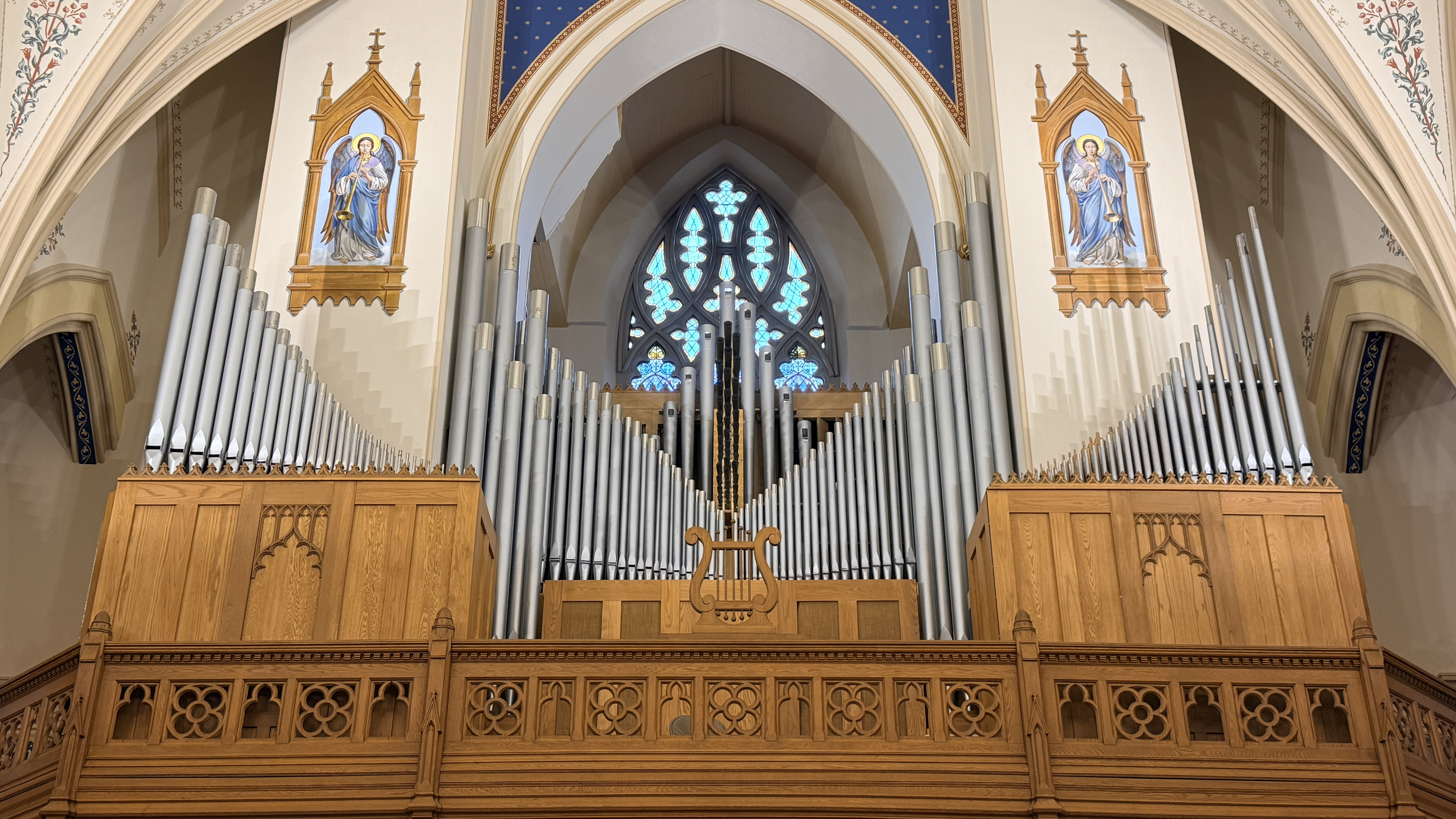
Organ pipes, rear gallery, St. Raphael's Cathedral (2026)

The cathedral's pipe organ was originally built in 1890 by a builder now unknown, and was rebuilt by the Tellers-Kent Organ Company in 1937. It has 46 ranks, with three manuals. The organ is composed of a number of chambers in what was the choir loft, plus another chamber along the southern wall near the front of the church. There is also a set of chimes attached to the organ.

Like a number of other organs, the pipework is largely left out in the open rather than being contained with the case. The pipework was artistically arranged to make a stunning visual display.

The organ console is situated in the choir area on the main level near the front of the church. It can be moved for various functions, such as mass and recitals. In 1991, the organ was refurbished after several years of fundraising. The organ is one of the larger ones in Dubuque, and is considered one of the finest in the city.

Great Organ
16′	Gedackt
8′	Principal
8′	Doppel Flute
8′	Gemshorn
4′	Octave
4′	Harmonic Flute
2′	Octavian
	Mixture IV
8′	Festival Trumpet

Schwell Organ
16′	Bourdon
8′	Gedeckt
8′	Salicional
8′	Celeste
4′	Principal
4′	Harmonic Flute
2 2/3′	Nazard
2′	Blockflote
1^{3}/_{5}′	Tierce
	Scharff III
16′	Oboe/Bassoon
8′	Trompette
	Tremolo

Choir Organ
8′	Melodia
8′	Gamba
8′	Celeste
4′	Flute d’ Amour
2′	Piccolo
1 1/3′	Larigot
8′	Clarinet
8′	Festival Trumpet (Gt)
	Tremolo
	Antiphonal Section
8′	Bourdon
8′	Gemshorn
4′	Principal
4′	Koppelflote
2′	Prestant
2′	Block Flote
1 1/3′	Spitzquint

Pedal Organ
32′	Resultant
16′	Open Diapason
16′	Principal
16′	Subbass
8′	Octave
8′	Subbass
5 1/3′	Quint
4′	Choral Bass
4′	Subbass
2 2/3′	Mixture IV
16′	Bombarde
8′	Bombarde
4′	Bombarde
	Antiphonal Pedal
16′	Subbass
8′	Bourdon
4′	Choral Bass

== Burials ==
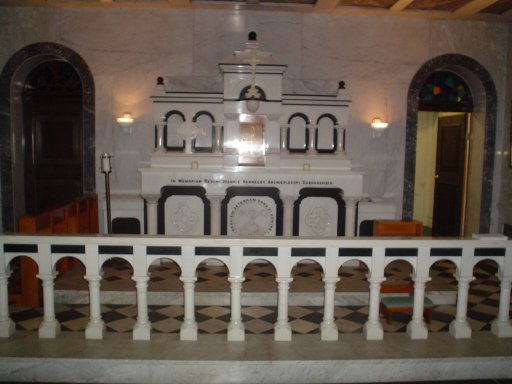
Altar and rails, Mortuary Chapel, St. Raphael's Cathedral (2005)

- Bishop Mathias Loras
- Bishop Clement Smyth
- Archbishop John Hennessy
- Archbishop Francis J.L. Beckman
- Archbishop Henry P. Rohlman
- Archbishop James J. Byrne
- Archbishop Raymond Etteldorf, Apostolic Delegate to New Zealand, then Apostolic Pro-Nuncio to Ethiopia.

== Other buildings ==
=== Rectory ===
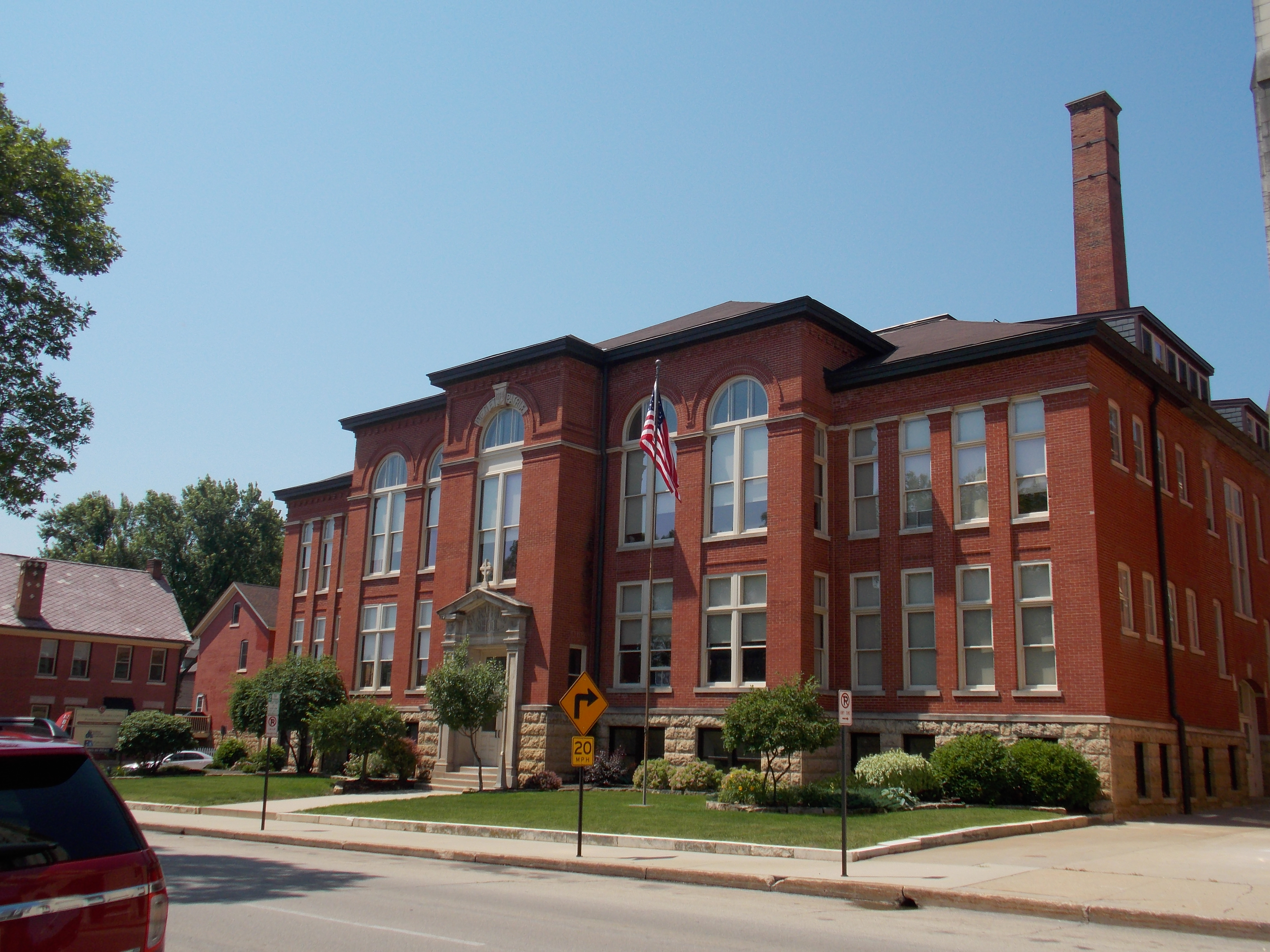
Former St. Raphael's School

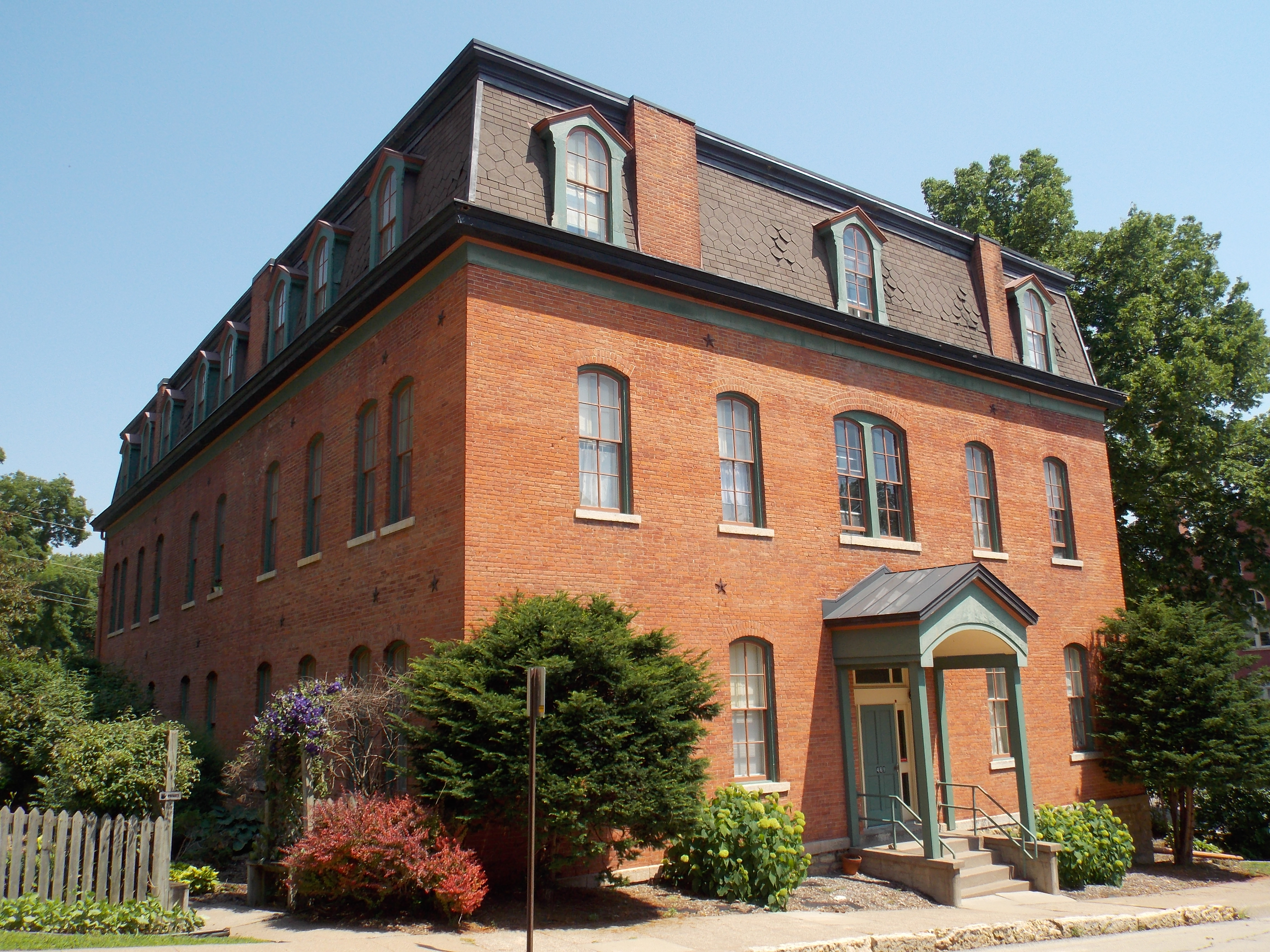
Former St. Raphael Convent

The rectory, which is adjacent to the cathedral on the north, was built around 1870. The three-story brick dwelling is considered the finest example of the Italianate style in the Cathedral District. The house features a low hipped roof, paired brackets on the eaves, simple window hoods, and an entrance canopy. The main entrance is flanked by side lights and it has a fan light above. The ironwork detailing and the doors were originally on the mansion of A.A. Cooper, which was named Greystone and was torn down in the late 1950s.

=== Convent ===
The Sisters of Charity of the Blessed Virgin Mary arrived in Dubuque and started teaching in the parish school in 1843. The building that became their parish convent was built as a girls' school sometime in the 1880s. It is a three-story, brick, Second Empire style structure built on a limestone foundation. It features a mansard roof, eaves, a simple cornice and stone trim. The five-bay main facade has a small porch over the main entrance. The windows on the first two floors are flattened arch windows, and the third floor round arch windows are placed in dormers. The building was converted into living space for the sisters after a new school building was constructed in 1904. The building has subsequently been sold by the parish and converted into senior housing.

=== School ===
The former St. Raphael's School building, which stands next to the cathedral on the south, was built in 1904 in the Neoclassical style. It replaced the boys' school and the girls' school buildings that were located in the rear of the cathedral property. The boys had been taught by a community of religious brothers. The boys' school building was located behind the girls' school and the cathedral itself and has subsequently been torn down. St. Raphael's School closed in 1976 because of low enrollment. The building was sold by the parish in the mid-1980s.

== See also ==
- List of Catholic cathedrals in the United States
- List of cathedrals in the United States
