= Mathias Loras =

French Catholic priest

His Excellency, The Right Reverend Mathias Loras
- Bishop of Dubuque
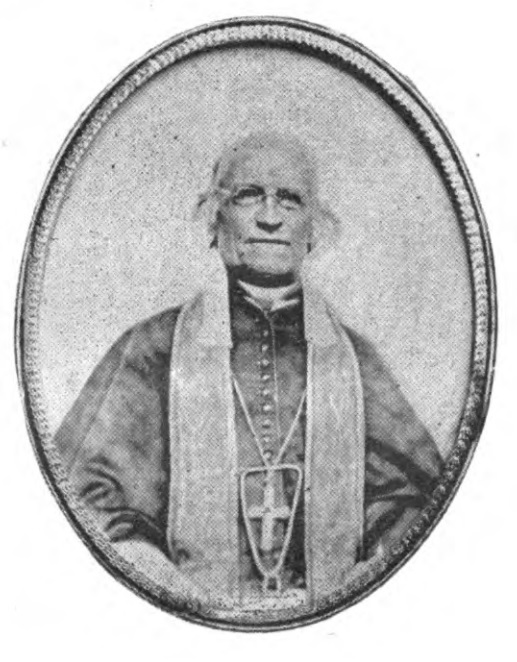
- See: Dubuque
- In office: July 28, 1837 – February 20, 1858
- Predecessor: None
- Successor: Clement Smyth
- Previous posts: Vicar general of Mobile (1830–1837); Rector of the Cathedral of the Immaculate Conception (1830–1837); 1st President of Spring Hill College (1830–1832)

Orders
- Ordination: November 12, 1815 by Joseph Fesch
- Consecration: December 10, 1837 by Michael Portier

Personal details
- Born: Pierre-Jean-Mathias Loras; August 30, 1792 Lyon, Kingdom of France
- Died: February 19, 1858 (aged 65) Dubuque, Iowa, U.S.
- Buried: St. Raphael's Cathedral
- Denomination: Catholic
- Motto: O crux ave spes unica (Hail, oh cross, our only hope)

Pierre-Jean-Mathias Loras (August 30, 1792 – February 19, 1858) was a French Catholic priest in the United States who served as the first Bishop of Dubuque, in what would become the state of Iowa. He was the first president of Spring Hill College in Mobile, Alabama, from 1830 to 1832, and is the founder of what is now known as Loras College in Dubuque.

== Early life ==
Mathias Loras was born to a wealthy aristocratic family in Lyon, France, on August 30, 1792. He was a descendant of a French noble of the robe family. During the Reign of Terror of 1793 to 1794 in France during the French Revolution, Loras' father and 16 other members of his family were executed by guillotine in Lyon. Mathias Loras was remembered as being pious and faithful, despite the chaos of the Napoleonic Era in France.

As a young man, Loras decided to become a priest. While in seminary, he tutored John Vianney, another seminarian and future saint. Loras was instructed by Reverend Ambrose Marechal and Reverend James Whitfield, both future archbishops of Baltimore in the United States.

== Priesthood ==
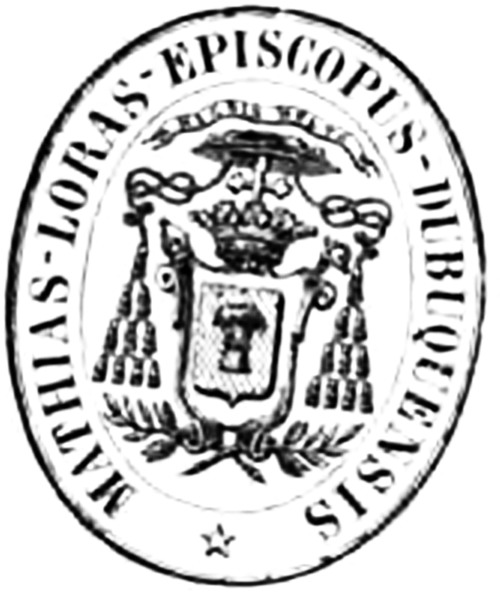
Seal of Bishop Loras

Loras was ordained a priest in Grenoble, France, on November 12, 1815, by Bishop Claude Simon. He was soon appointed as superior of the ecclesiastical Seminary of Largentière. He later resigned as superior to join a group of priests conducting parish missions in the Archdiocese of Lyon.

In 1829 Bishop-elect Michael Portier of the Diocese of Mobile traveled to France to recruit priests for his diocese. Meeting with Loras, Portier persuaded him to serve in Alabama. On November 1, 1829, Loras and Portier, along with several French seminarians, sailed from France to New Orleans, Louisiana. Disembarking in New Orleans on December 25th, they arrived in Mobile, Alabama on January 2, 1830. Loras assisted with Portier's installation as bishop in Mobile.

Portier appointed Loras as vicar general for the diocese, assigning him the training of the French seminarians. Loras was also named rector of the Cathedral of the Immaculate Conception in Mobile. He held these positions for seven years, helping Portier recruit priests to the diocese. From 1830 to 1832, Loras served as the first president of Spring Hill College in Mobile.

== Bishop of Dubuque ==
=== 1830 to 1840 ===
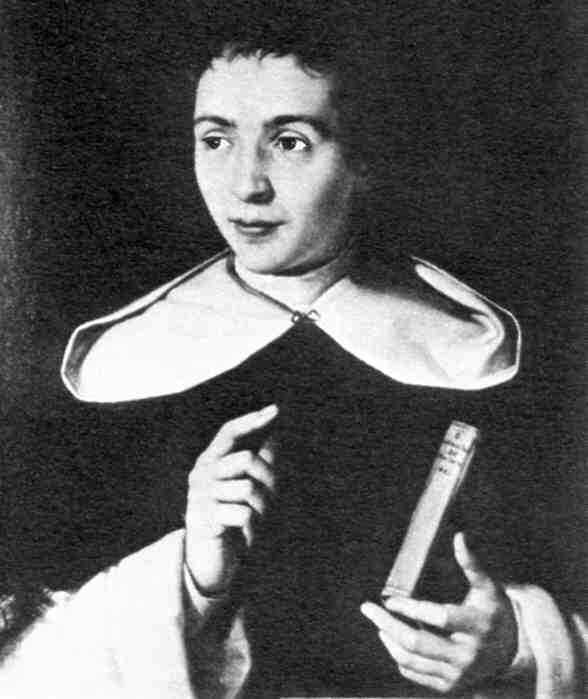
Venerable Reverend Samuel Charles Mazzuchelli (pre-1923)

In 1837, the third Provincial Council of Baltimore, composed of the bishops in the United States, recommended to Pope Gregory XVI that he erect a new diocese in the American Midwest, due to the rapidly increasing immigration of Catholics. In response, the pope erected the Diocese of Dubuque on July 28, 1837, appointing Loras as its first bishop. Loras was consecrated at the Cathedral of the Immaculate Conception in Mobile on December 10, 1837, by Portier. His principal co-consecrators were Bishops Antoine Blanc of New Orleans and John Stephen Bazin of Vincennes.

Knowing little about his new diocese, Loras wrote to Bishop Joseph Rosati of the Diocese of St. Louis for more information. Rosati was of little help. At that time, present-day Iowa was a sparsely-settled part of the Missouri Territory. The diocese covered Iowa, most of Minnesota, and North and South Dakota east of the Missouri River. There were only 3,000 Catholics in three parishes and one Indian mission in the diocese. They were all served by one priest, Reverend Samuel Charles Mazzuchelli. On July 4, 1838, the area would become the Iowa Territory.

Realizing that he needed more help and money for his new diocese, Loras decided to first go to France to recruit priests and raise funds. In the meantime, Loras appointed Mazzuchelli as vicar general and administrator to run the Diocese of Dubuque in his absence. While in France, Loras was able to recruit Reverend Joseph Crétin and Reverend Jean-Antoine-Marie Pelamourgues to serve in the diocese. Loras also persuaded the seminarians Augustin Ravoux, Lucien Galtier, Remigius Petiot and James Causse to finish their formation for the priesthood in Dubuque.

After arriving back in the United States in 1839, Loras traveled with his French recruits to St. Louis, Missouri, where they spent the winter and early spring. While in St. Louis, Loras met the French explorer Joseph Nicolas Nicollet who had made several excursions into the midwestern territories. Nicollet was a valuable source of information for Loras.On April 19, 1839, Loras and his party finally arrived in Dubuque. Soon after his arrival, Loras dedicated St. Raphael's Church in Dubuque as the first cathedral in the diocese.

In 1839, he established St. Raphael's Seminary in Dubuque to prepare American men for the priesthood. Over the next several years, Loras established several missions among the Native American tribes in the diocese and a number of schools. He also erected parishes in every populated area of the diocese. On one occasion, Loras and Pelamourgues traveled to Fort Snelling in present-day Minnesota, to minister to French-Canadian and Native American Catholics. After 15 days there, the two men traveled by canoe to Prairie Du Chien in present-day Wisconsin, to meet with Catholics there.

Loras was a strong advocate against alcohol abuse and encouraged the foundation of temperance societies throughout the diocese to address this problem.

=== 1840 to 1850 ===
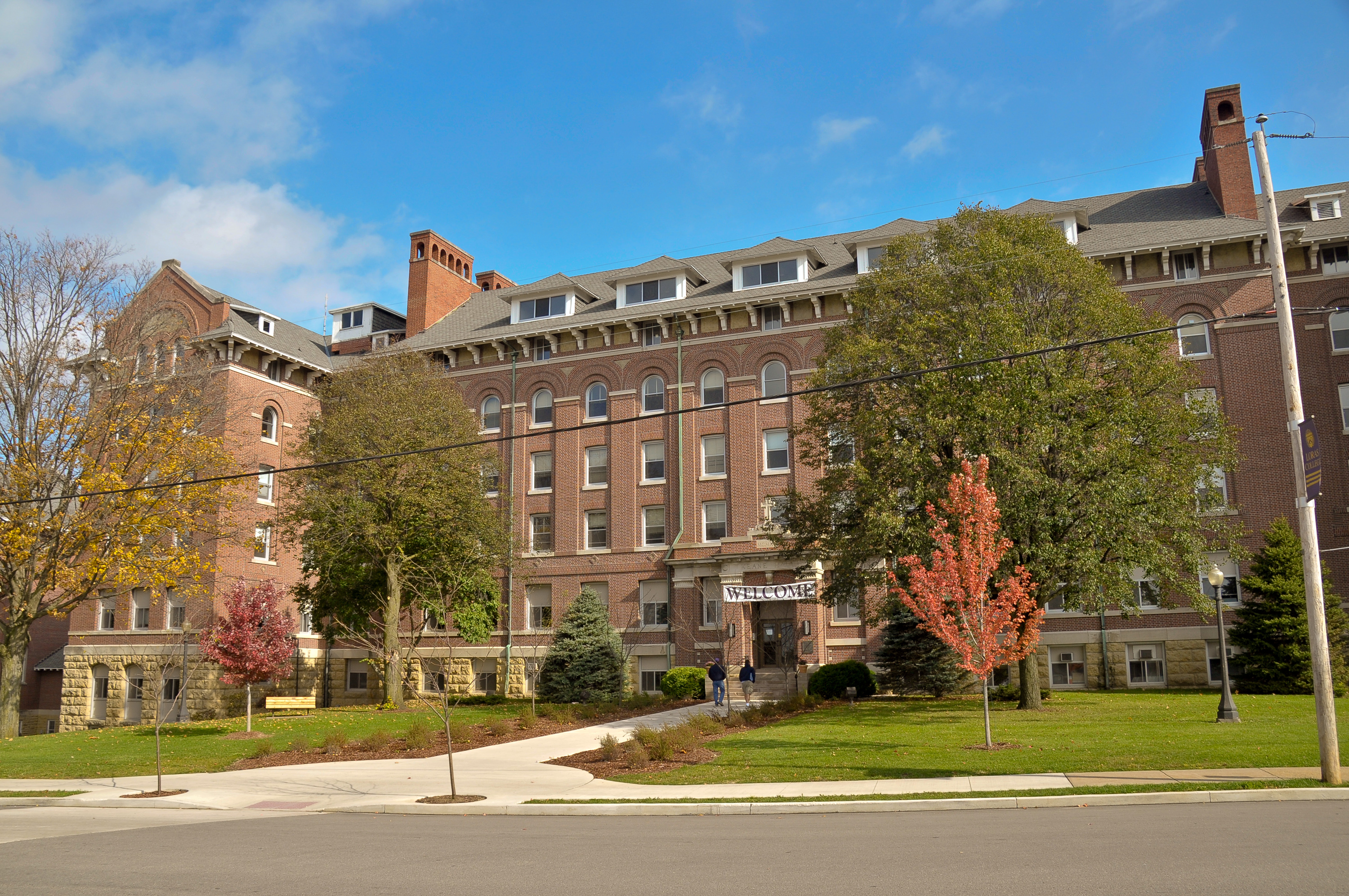
Loras College, Dubuque, Iowa (2008)

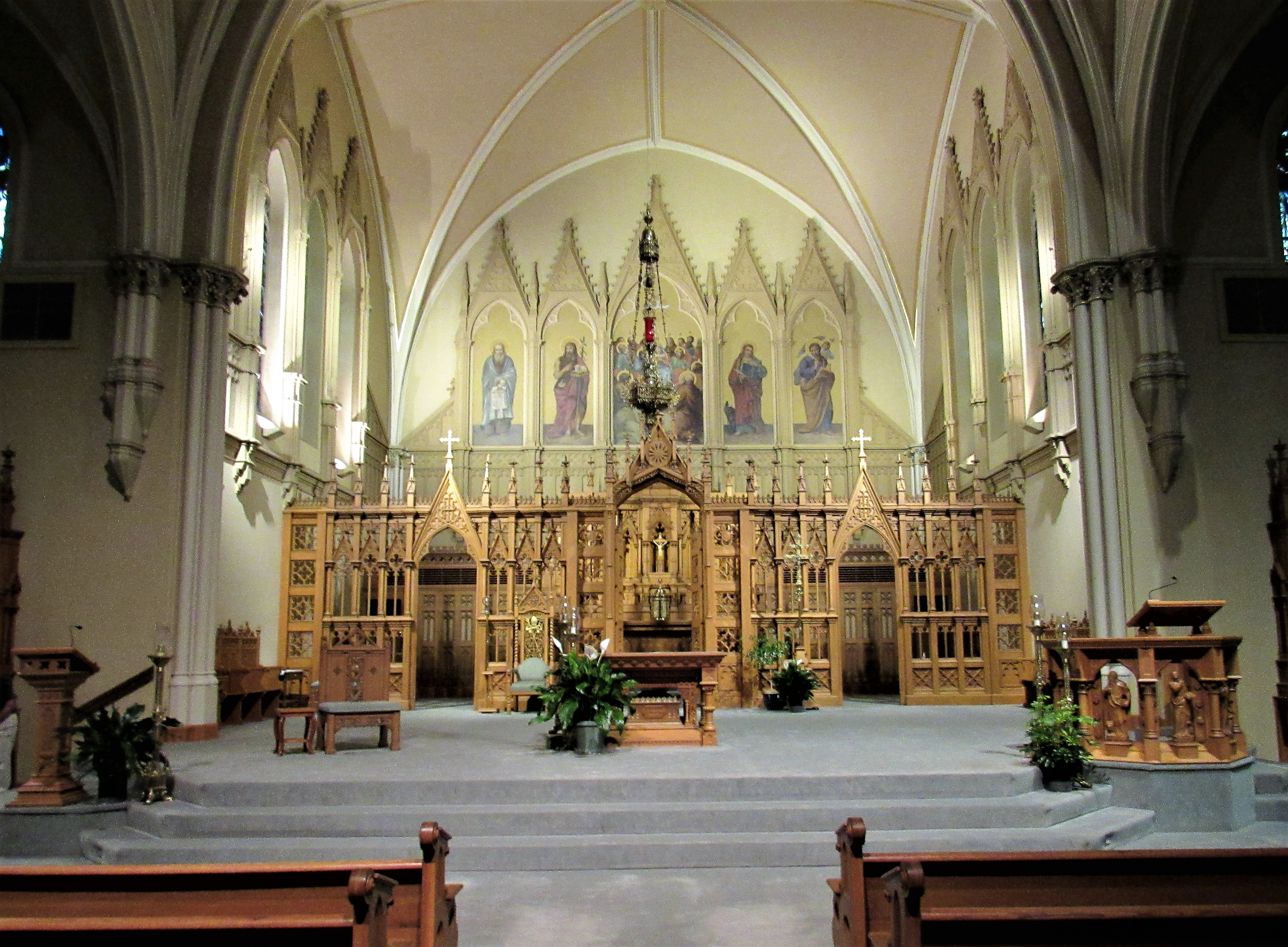
St. Raphael Cathedral, Dubuque, Iowa (2018)

In 1843, Loras was visiting Philadelphia, Pennsylvania, when he met Mother Mary Frances Clarke, the founder of the Sisters of Charity of the Blessed Virgin Mary in that city. He asked Clarke to send some of the sisters to Dubuque to establish schools for the Native Americans. In June 1843, five sisters accompanied Loras on the trip back to Dubuque. They never established any schools for the Native Americans, instead founding them for the European immigrants.

During the 1840s, Loras was able to get addition financial assistance from several Catholic missionary organizations in Europe. These included the Society for the Propagation of the Faith of Lyon, France, the Leopoldine Society of Vienna in the Austrian Empire and the Foreign Mission Society of Munich in the Kingdom of Bavaria.

During the early 1840s, many of the immigrants to Iowa were poor Irish Catholics. Many of them were sending their money back to Ireland to help relatives instead of donating to their parishes, causing friction with the clergy. Also, the Irish believed that Loras was building more churches for the German immigrants and not providing enough Irish priests. In 1844, a number of Irish parishioners stopped paying their pew rents. In response, Loras moved to Burlington, Iowa, for a while until tensions cooled.

In 1846, Loras visited a group of German Catholic immigrants living 30 miles west of Dubuque. He convinced them to name their community New Vienna in honor of the Austrian benefactors of the diocese.During his visits to the Eastern United States, Loras was shocked by the conditions that immigrants were enduring in the cities there. He published articles in periodicals there that described the cheap fertile agricultural land in Iowa and Minnesota and the opportunities for Catholics there.

Loras in 1849 visited Mount Melleray Abbey near Cappoquin, during a trip to Ireland. He persuaded Reverend Clement Smyth and six monks to travel to Iowa that same year, The men established the New Melleray Abbey near Dubuque. When the first buildings in the monastery were completed, 16 more monks arrived to join them.

=== 1850 to 1858 ===
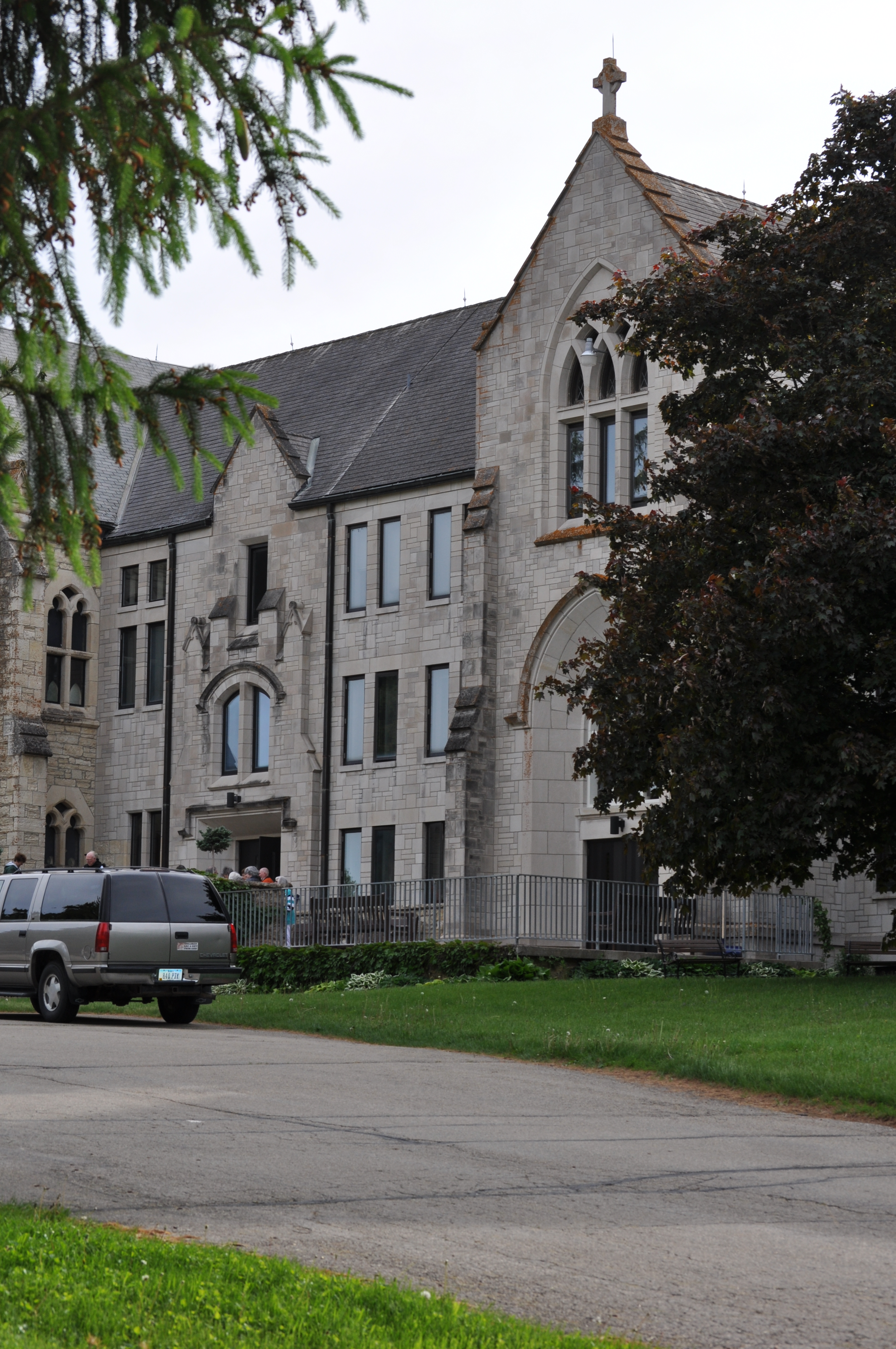
New Melleray Abbey (2011)

In 1850, Loras expanded the St. Raphael Seminary into a larger facility, Mount St. Bernard College and Seminary. When he had the time, Loras would teach classes at Mount St. Bernard or simply go there to socialize with the faculty and students. In July 1850, Pope Pius IX established the Diocese of Saint Paul in Minnesota, reducing the Diocese of Dubuque to the State of Iowa. In 1851, Loras welcomed a contingent from the Brothers of Christian Instruction into the diocese; they established a novitiate outside of Dubuque.

By 1852, Lora's health was in decline. He was partially blind and deaf, and had suffered a series of mini-strokes. Conflicts arose again with the Irish immigrants in Dubuque in 1854 when they threatened to stop making donations during mass. Loras responded by saying he would pull his priests from all the churches in the city. A compromise solution eventually defused the conflict.

While attending the provincial council in St. Louis in 1855, Mathia asked Archbishop Peter Kenrick to petition Pius IX to appoint Reverend Timothy Clement Smyth, prior of St. Melleray Abbey, as coadjutor bishop of Dubuque. In 1856, financial problems and a lack of clergy forced Loras to close Mount St. Bernard.On January 9, 1857, the pope named Smyth as coadjutor bishop of Dubuque.

As the diocese had grown tremendously in population, Loras wrote to Pius IX in May 1857, asking that he erect a second diocese in Iowa. However, the pope did not accept his request. Loras' last big project was the construction of a new St. Raphael's Cathedral. The cornerstone for the new cathedral was laid in July 1857. By December 25, 1857, it was completed sufficiently to allow Loras to celebrate the first mass there.

=== Death and legacy ===
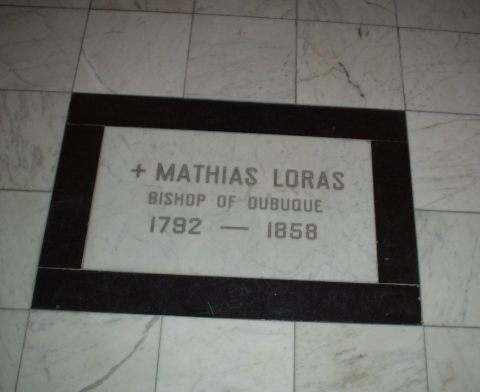
Tomb of Bishop Loras, mortuary chapel, St. Raphael's Cathedral

Although he had been sick for some time, Loras' death still came suddenly. During the winter of 1858, Loras had been seriously ill, but seemed to be recovering. On February 18th, he told his staff that he was retiring for the evening and asked not to be disturbed. He was planning to pray a long divine office and wanted to finish it without interruption. During the night, Loras' housekeeper heard him moaning and Reverend McCabe went to check on him. He found Loras collapsed on the floor. During the early morning hours on February 19th, 1958 Loras died; he was age 65..

Smyth celebrated a funeral mass for Loras at St. Raphael's Cathedral that Sunday. He was interred in the mortuary chapel of the cathedral. At the time of his death, the diocese had grown to 54,000 Catholics in 60 parishes, served by 48 priests. In 1939, Columbia College in Dubuque was renamed as Loras College. During the ceremony, a 12 foot (3.7 m) statue of Loras was unveiled on the campus. Loras Boulevard in Dubuque was also named after him. In 2020, college administrators discovered that Loras had owned an enslaved woman name Marie Louise for 16 years. He left her in Alabama after moving to Iowa, hiring her out to others. The college removed the Loras statue from the campus.

Catholic Church titles
Preceded by None	President of Spring Hill College; 1830–1832	Succeeded by John Stephen Bazin
Preceded by None	Bishop of Dubuque; 1837–1858	Succeeded by Timothy Clement Smyth
