= Timothy Edward Freyer =

American prelate

His Excellency, The Most Reverend Timothy Edward Freyer KCHS
- Auxiliary Bishop of Orange
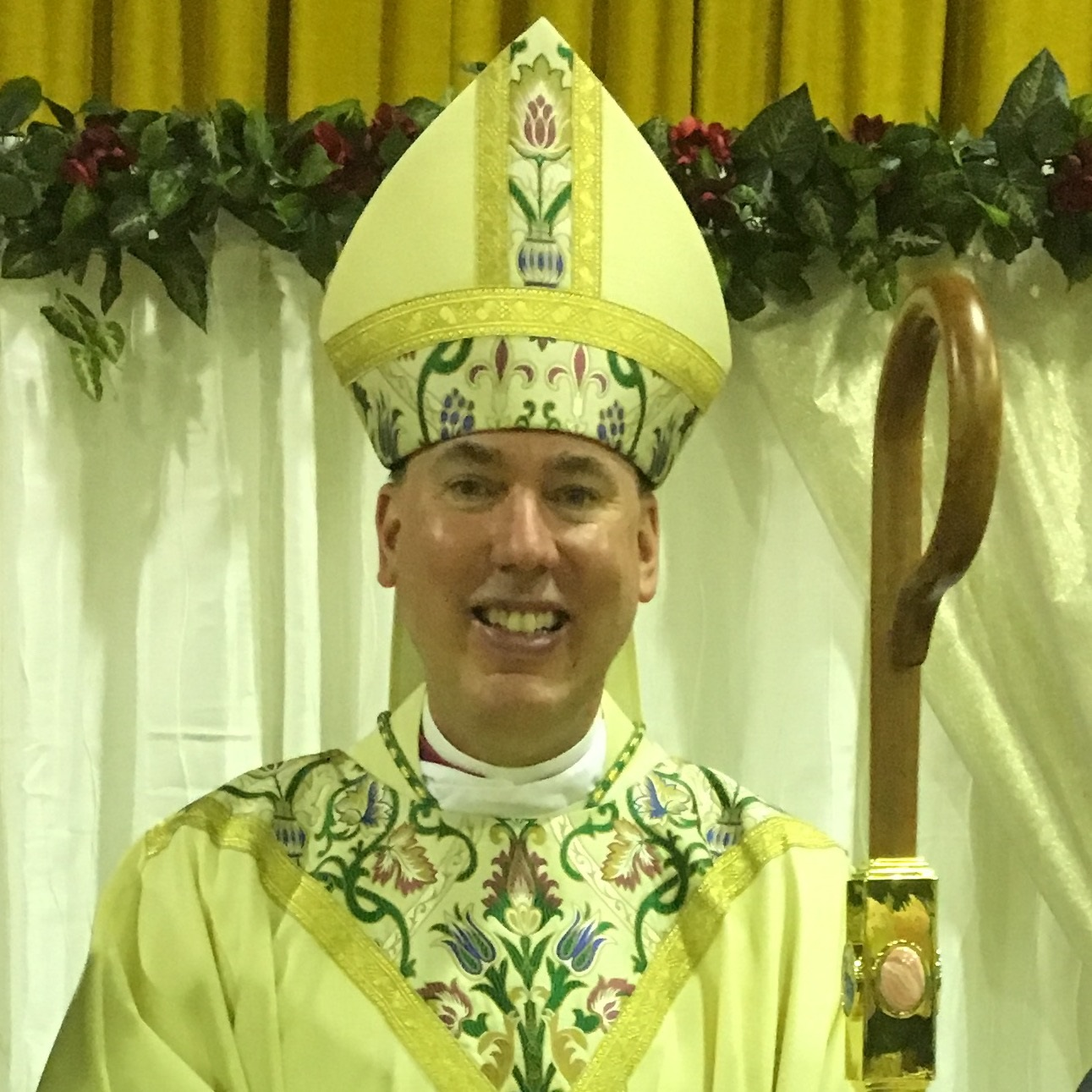
- Freyer in 2017
- Province: Los Angeles
- Diocese: Orange
- Appointed: November 23, 2016
- Installed: January 17, 2017
- Other posts: Vicar General, Orange; Titular Bishop of Strathearn

Orders
- Ordination: June 10, 1989 by Norman Francis McFarland
- Consecration: January 17, 2017 by Kevin William Vann; José Horacio Gómez; Jaime Soto

Personal details
- Born: October 13, 1963 (age 63) Los Angeles, California, US
- Motto: Euntes docete omnes gentes (Latin for 'Go out and make disciples of nations')
- Styles
- Reference style: His Excellency; The Most Reverend
- Spoken style: Your Excellency
- Religious style: Bishop

Timothy Edward Freyer (born October 13, 1963) is an American Catholic prelate who serves as auxiliary bishop and vicar general for the Diocese of Orange in California.

== Biography ==
=== Early life ===
Freyer was born on October 13, 1963, in Los Angeles and grew up in Huntington Beach, California. Freyer is the only child of Jerry and Patricia Freyer. After graduating from Huntington Beach High School, he entered the St. John's Seminary College in Camarillo, California, where he earned his bachelor's degree. He then spent four years as a graduate student at Saint John's studying theology.

=== Priesthood ===
Freyer was ordained a priest at Holy Family Cathedral in Orange, California, on June 10, 1989, by Bishop Norman McFarland for the Diocese of Orange.

After his 1989 ordination, the diocese assigned Freyer to the following Southern California parishes as an associate pastor:

- St. Hedwig in Los Alamitos (1989 to 1994)
- Our Lady of Fatima Parish in San Clemente (1994 to 1999)
- St. Catherine of Siena in Laguna Beach (1999 to 2001)

In addition to his pastoral jobs, Freyer was named as the first bishop's liaison to the Jovenes para Cristo (Young Adults for Christ) movement in 1998. He helped the Jovenes write their statutes and revise their plan of formation. Freyer also assisted them in opening chapters in California, Texas and Oregon.

In 2001, Freyer was appointed pastor of St. Mary's Parish in Fullerton. He was transferred from St. Catherine in 2002 to serve as administrator for St. Boniface Parish in Anaheim for one year; he was named pastor of St. Boniface in 2003. Freyer left St. Boniface in 2012 when Bishop Kevin Vann named him episcopal vicar for priests.

Freyer served as a board member for the following organizations:

- the Anaheim Family Justice Center in Dana Point, California
- St. Jude Medical Center in Fullerton, California

Freyer is a chaplain for the Anaheim Police Department.

=== Auxiliary Bishop of Orange ===
On November 23, 2016, Pope Francis named Freyer as auxiliary bishop for the Diocese of Orange. On January 17, 2017, Freyer was consecrated by Vann at Saint Columban Church in Garden Grove, with Archbishop José Horacio Gómez and Bishop Jaime Soto serving as co-consecrators.

Freyer holds the rank of senior chaplain in the Military and Hospitallar Order of St. Lazarus of Jerusalem as a chaplain in the Order's Commandery of the West. As auxiliary bishop, Freyer additionally serves jointly with Thanh Thai Nguyen as vicar general of the diocese.

== See also ==
- Catholic Church hierarchy
- Catholic Church in the United States
- Historical list of the Catholic bishops of the United States
- List of Catholic bishops of the United States
- Lists of patriarchs, archbishops, and bishops

Catholic Church titles
Preceded by -	Auxiliary Bishop of Orange; 2017-Present	Succeeded by -
