= Thanh Thai Nguyen =

Vietnamese American Catholic prelate (born 1953)

His Excellency, The Most Reverend Thanh Thai Nguyen KCHS
- Auxiliary Bishop of Orange
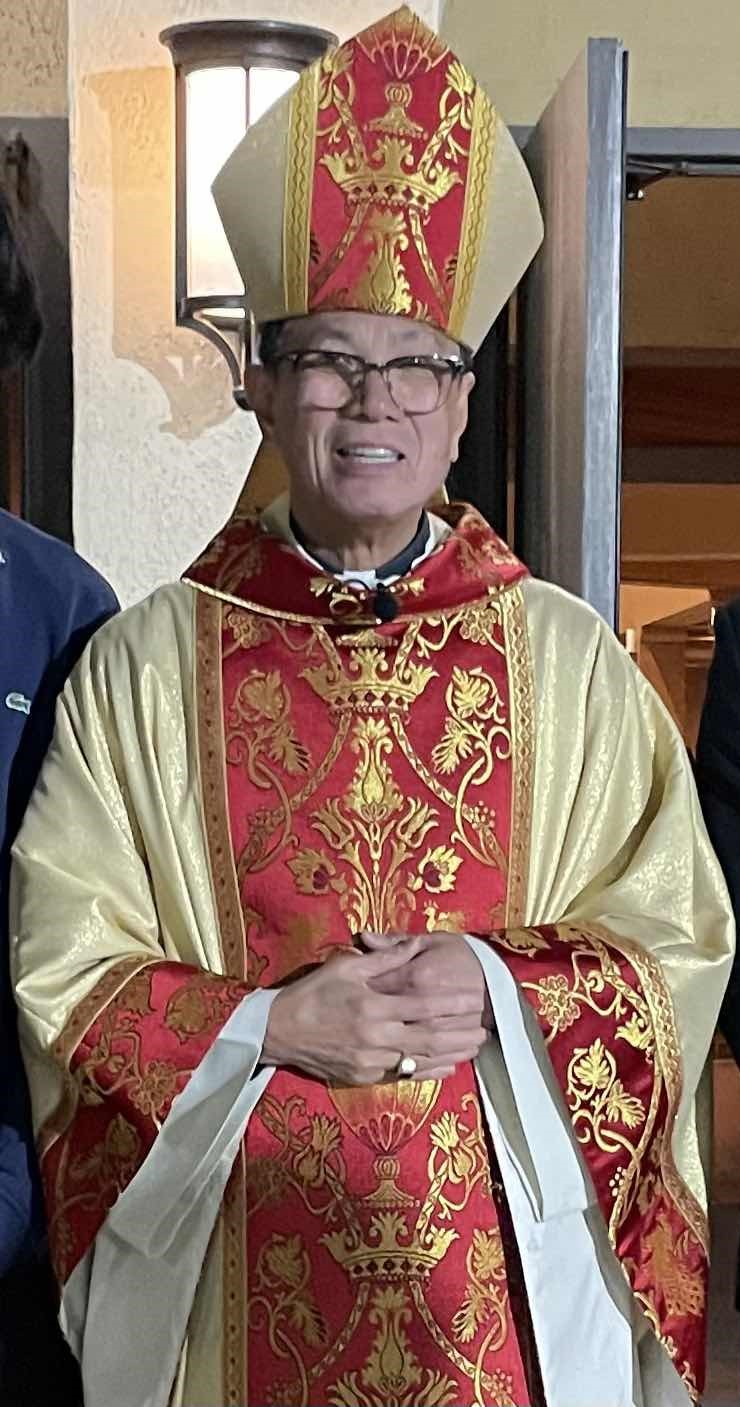
- Nguyen in 2024, after a Lunar New Year Mass
- Native name: Tôma Nguyễn Thái Thành
- Province: Los Angeles
- Diocese: Orange
- Appointed: October 6, 2017
- Installed: December 19, 2017
- Other posts: Vicar General, Orange; Titular Bishop of Acalissus

Orders
- Ordination: May 11, 1991 by Peter A. Rosazza
- Consecration: December 19, 2017 by Kevin Vann, Felipe de Jesús Estévez, and Robert Joseph Baker

Personal details
- Born: Nguyễn Thái Thành; April 7, 1953 (age 73) Nha Trang, French Indochina
- Education: Saint Joseph Major Seminary; Pontifical University of Saint Pius X; Hartford State Technical College; Merrimack College; Weston Jesuit School of Theology
- Motto: He leads me; (Ngài dẫn dắt tôi)
- Styles
- Reference style: His Excellency; The Most Reverend
- Spoken style: Your Excellency
- Religious style: Bishop

Thomas Thanh Thai Nguyen (born April 7, 1953) is a Vietnamese American Catholic prelate who serves as an auxiliary bishop and vicar general for the Diocese of Orange in California.

== Biography ==
=== Early life, emigration, and education ===
The second in a family of eight boys and three girls, Nguyễn Thái Thành was born on April 7, 1953, in Nha Trang in what was then French Indochina. At age 13, he joined the Saint Joseph Congregation of Nha Trang and professed first vows eight years later. He attended Saint Joseph Major Seminary and the Pontifical University of Saint Pius X of Đà Lạt to study philosophy.

His seminary formation was interrupted in 1975 after the Fall of Saigon, both by the abolition of his Congregation by the Communist government and the forced labor he and other seminarians had to endure to continue their formation. This later led Nguyen and 25 members of his extended family to flee Vietnam on a small motorboat from Cam Ranh Bay in 1979.

They were engulfed in a storm, but safely landed in the Philippines after 18 days at sea, several of which they were without food or water. Nguyen later recounted his journey, saying, "We experienced hunger and thirst. With God's grace, it rained three times, and each time we had enough water for one cup each. In the midst of this life struggle, we were faithful to morning and evening prayer – saying the rosary most of the time". After ten months at a refugee camp in Manila, they were allowed to immigrate to the United States in 1980 and settled in Beaumont, Texas.

Eventually, Nguyen and his family moved to Hartford, Connecticut and he worked for Catholic Charities there while enrolled at Hartford State Technical College. After finishing his studies in 1981, he became a mathematics and science teacher in the Hartford Public Schools District.

In 1984, wanting to continue in religious life again, he entered the Missionaries of Our Lady of La Salette and entered Merrimack College in North Andover, Massachusetts to study philosophy. After two years there, he graduated and began his novitiate year in Washington, D.C. Nguyen took his first vows in 1987 and attended Weston Jesuit School of Theology in Cambridge, Massachusetts until 1990. He professed solemn vows on September 19 and was ordained a deacon that year.

=== Priesthood ===
On May 11, 1991, Nguyen was ordained to the priesthood by Auxiliary Bishop Peter Rosazza for the Missionaries at Our Lady of Sorrows Church in Hartford. After his ordination, the Missionaries assigned Nguyen as an associate pastor at Thomas the Apostle Parish in Smyrna, Georgia. He was transferred in 1994 to St. Ann Parish in Marietta, Georgia, to serve in the same role. In 1996, Nguyen became parochial vicar at Christ the King Parish in Jacksonville, Florida, part of the Diocese of St. Augustine.

While at Christ the King, Nguyen was incardinated a priest of the diocese in 1999. Continuing to serve as parochial vicar, he was later named pastor of Christ the King in 2001. While pastor there, he began offering Sunday Mass and established a Catholic community center for the Vietnamese. Nguyen was transferred from Christ the King to St. Joseph Parish (Jacksonville) in 2014, where he inaugurated a youth Mass and built a youth center. He also served as a member of the college of consultors and the presbyteral council of the diocese.

=== Auxiliary Bishop of Orange ===
Pope Francis appointed Nguyen as auxiliary bishop of the Diocese of Orange on October 6, 2017. During the diocesan press conference, he recalled that on September 27, he received a phone call from Archbishop Christophe Pierre, Apostolic Nuncio to the United States, who announced to him about his new role. Nguyen responded, saying he needed thirty minutes to call back, and Pierre agreed on the condition that he accepted the appointment. Nguyen was left "stunned and shaken" by the news. However, he accepted, and Bishop Kevin Vann of Orange then reached out to Nguyen and assisted him in his transition to California.

Bishop Dominic Mai Luong, who was the first Vietnamese auxiliary bishop of Orange, was believed by many, including Nguyen, to be his predecessor in many respects, and that "the torch was passed" from him to Nguyen. Mai was to be one of Nguyen's co-consecrators, but died on December 6, just a few weeks before the Mass. Bishop Robert Joseph Baker of Birmingham, who was the pastor of Christ the King while Nguyen served there, was chosen to take Mai's place in the ceremony.

On December 19, 2017, Nguyen was consecrated as a bishop by Vann at St. Columban Church in Garden Grove. Bishops Felipe de Jesús Estévez of St. Augustine and Baker were the co-consecrators. Also present at the Mass were Cardinals Roger Mahony and William Levada, as well as clergy from around the globe, which included some from Saint Joseph Seminary in Vietnam. Becoming the second Vietnamese American bishop, he leads the largest Vietnamese Catholic community in the country.

As auxiliary bishop, Nguyen additionally serves jointly with Timothy Edward Freyer as vicar general of the diocese.

=== Personal life ===
Nguyen has a passion for music and can play guitar. He is also an avid tennis player, and immediately signed up for a gym membership upon arriving in Orange. Nguyen is also an honoree of the Order of the Holy Sepulchre, which was awarded to him by the Pope. The insignia of the papal order is also present on his coat of arms.

== Episcopal succession ==
Catholic Church titles
| Preceded by - | Auxiliary Bishop of Orange; 2017-Present | Succeeded by - |
