= List of churches in the Diocese of Orange =

This is a list of current and former Roman Catholic churches in the Roman Catholic Diocese of Orange in California, which includes most of Orange County. The diocese is organized into seven deaneries of seven to twelve parishes or worship centers each.

== Deanery 1 ==
This deanery contains parishes in Westminster, Garden Grove and other Orange County communities.

Name	Image	Location	Description/Notes
Blessed Sacrament		14072 Olive St, Westminster	Established in 1947 by the Columban Fathers; mother church to ten other parishes.
Christ Cathedral		13280 Chapman Ave, Garden Grove	Formerly the parish of St. Callistus, founded in 1961. Redesignated Christ Cathedral Parish in 2014 after the diocese's acquisition of the former Crystal Cathedral, built in 1981; former St. Callistus campus sold to Shepherd's Grove
Korean Martyrs Catholic Center		7655 Trask Ave, Westminster	Founded in 1977 for Korean immigrants.
Poong Jesus Nazareno Filipino Center			
St. Columban		10801 Stanford Ave, Garden Grove	Founded as a mission of St. Isidore's. Became a parish 1953, current church dedicated in 1968.
St. Hedwig		11482 Los Alamitos Blvd, Los Alamitos	Established in 1960, merged with St. Isidore; renovated in 1990
St. Irenaeus		5201 Evergreen Ave, Cypress	Founded in 1961.
St. Polycarp		8100 Chapman Ave, Stanton	Established as a mission in the 1920s; became a parish in 1961; current church dedicated in 1962

== Deanery 2 ==
This deanery contains parishes in Orange, Yorba Linda and other Orange County communities along with one center.

Name	Image	Location	Description/Notes
Holy Family		566 South Glassell St, Orange	Served as the cathedral of the diocese from 1976 to 2019
La Purisma		11712 N. Hewes St, Orange	Founded for Mexican farm workers in 1923. First church built in 1958, current church dedicated in 2005.
San Antonio de Padua del Cañon		5800 E Santa Ana Canyon Rd, Anaheim Hills	First chapel dedicated to St. Anthony of Padua, dedicated in 1860 to serve Rancho Cañón de Santa Ana; became part of St. Boniface parish. New parish of San Antonio erected in 1977, first mass in current church celebrated in 1991.
Santa Clara de Asis		22005 Ave de la Paz, Yorba Linda	Founded in 2001; first mass celebrated at St. Francis of Assisi School.
St. Angela Merici		585 S. Walnut Ave, Brea	Organized 1951 as a mission of St. Mary's in Fullerton, designated parish in 1957.
St. Joseph		717 N Bradford Ave, Placentia	Founded in 1952, dedicated in 1953.
St. Martin de Porres		19767 Yorba Linda Blvd, Yorba Linda	Founded in 1970, original church completed in 1972. Current church dedicated in 1982.
St. Norbert		300 E. Taft Ave, Orange	Founded in 1963, current church dedicated in 1967.
St. Pope John Paul II Polish Center		3999 Rose Dr, Yorba Linda	

== Deanery 3 ==
This deanery contains parishes in Anaheim, Fullerton and other Orange County communities.

Name	Image	Location	Description/Notes
Our Lady of Guadalupe		900 W. La Habra Blvd, La Habra	
St. Anthony Mary Claret		1450 E. La Palma Ave, Anaheim	
St. Boniface		120 N. Janss St, Anaheim	Oldest continuously operating Catholic church in Orange County; founded in 1860 for German immigrants; current church dedicated in 1964
St. Juliana Falconieri		1316 North Acacia Ave, Fullerton	Founded in 1965; staffed by Servites since 1993
St. Justin Martyr		2050 W. Ball Rd, Anaheim	
St. Mary's		400 W. Commonwealth Ave, Fullerton	Established 1912.
St. Philip Benizi		235 S. Pine Dr, Fullerton	Established by the Servite Order in 1957 at the behest of the Archdiocese; originally met at Merilark Roller Rink. First church dedicated August 1959, destroyed by arson in 2000. Current church opened 2005.
St. Pius V		7691 Orangethorpe Ave, Buena Park	Founded in 1948. Current church dedicated in 1994. Staffed by Augustinians Fathers from 1977 to 2005.
St. Thomas the Apostle Korean Center		412 N. Crescent Way, Anaheim	

== Deanery 4 ==
This deanery only contains parishes in Santa Ana.

Name	Image	Location	Description/Notes
Christ Our Savior		2000 West Alton Ave, Santa Ana	Founded in 2005 with the original intent to make it thecathedral parish; current church dedicated in 2021
Immaculate Heart of Mary		1100 S Center St, Santa Ana	Founded as a mission of St. Anne's.
Our Lady of Guadalupe Delhi		541 E Central Ave, Santa Ana	
Our Lady of Guadalupe Santa Ana		1322 E Third St, Santa Ana	Founded in 1922
Our Lady of La Vang		288 S Harbor Blvd, Santa Ana	Founded in 2001, church dedicated in 2006.
Our Lady of the Pillar		1622 W 6th St, Santa Ana	Founded in 1965 as a mission of Our Lady of Lourdes
St. Anne		1344 S Main St, Santa Ana	Founded in 1923.
St. Barbara		730 S Euclid St, Santa Ana	Founded in 1962; current church dedicated in 1965
St. Joseph		727 Minter St, Santa Ana	
Vietnamese Catholic Center		1538 Century Blvd, Santa Ana	

== Deanery 5 ==
This deanery contains parishes in Huntington Beach, Costa Mesa and other Orange County communities.

Name	Image	Location	Description/Notes
Holy Family		13900 Church Place, Seal Beach	Founded in 1963 as a mission serving Leisure World residents; became a parish in 1969.
Holy Spirit		17270 Ward St, Fountain Valley	
St. Anne		340 10th St, Seal Beach	
St. Bonaventure		16410 Springdale St, Huntington Beach	Founded in 1965
St. Joachim		1964 Orange Ave, Costa Mesa	Founded in 1947 using a chapel and other former buildings of the Santa Ana Army Air Base. Chapel moved and dedicated in 1948. Current church dedicated in 1965. Mother church to St. John the Baptist.
St. John the Baptist		1015 Baker St, Costa Mesa	
St. Mary's by the Sea		321 10th St, Huntington Beach	
Ss. Simon and Jude		20444 Magnolia St, Huntington Beach	Founded in 1905 as St. Mary's mission of St. Joseph's Parish in Santa Ana, became a parish in 1912. Rededicated to Saints Simon and Jude in 1921. Current church dedicated in 1973. Staffed by Franciscans from 1964 to 2020.
St. Vincent de Paul		8345 Talbert Ave, Huntington Beach	Founded in 1977 from the territory of Saints Simon and Jude, Saint Bonaventure, and Holy Spirit Parishes. Staffed by Vincentian Fathers from 1977 to 1995. Current church dedicated in 2002.

== Deanery 6 ==
This deanery contains parishes in Newport Beach, Irvine and other Orange County communities.

Name	Image	Location	Description/Notes
Our Lady of Mt. Carmel		1441 W Balboa Blvd, Newport Beach	
Our Lady of Peace Korean Center		14010 Remington, Irvine	
Our Lady Queen of Angels		2046 Mar Vista Dr, Newport Beach	Founded in 1961
St. Cecilia		1301 Sycamore Ave, Tustin	Founded in 1957
St. Elizabeth Ann Seton		9 Hillgate, Irvine	Founded in 1971 as a mission of Our Lady Queen of Angels Parish in Newport Beach. Became a parish in 1976. Current church dedicated in 1994.
St. John Neumann		2532 Dupont Dr, Irvine	
St. John Vianney Chapel		314 Marine Ave, Balboa Island	Chapel of ease administered by Our Lady of Mt. Carmel Parish
St. Kilian		26872 Estanciero Dr, Mission Viejo	Founded in 1970, current church dedicated in 2013.
St. Nicholas		24252 El Toro Rd, Laguna Woods	
St. Thomas More		51 Marketplace, Irvine	Founded as a mission of St. John Neumann Parish in 1996; current church dedicated in 2009.
Solano		22082 Antonio Pkwy, Rancho Santa Margarita	
Santiago de Compostela		21782 Lake Forest Dr, Lake Forest	

== Deanery 7 ==
This deanery contains parishes in San Clemente, Laguna Beach and other Orange County communities.

Name	Image	Location	Description/Notes
Corpus Christi		27231 Aliso Viejo Pkwy, Aliso Viejo	Founded in 1999
Holy Trinity		1600 Corporate Dr, Ladera Ranch	Founded in 2005. Current church dedicated in 2017. Church contains an 18th-century tabernacle and stained glass from the Marywood Chapel, which served the former diocesan offices.
Mission Basilica San Juan Capistrano		31520 Camino Capistrano, San Juan Capistrano	Used the Serra Chapel of the former Mission San Juan Capistrano until the current structure was completed in 1986. Designated a minor basilica in 2003.
Our Lady of Fatima		105 N La Esperanza, San Clemente	Founded in 1947
St. Catherine of Siena		1042 Temple Terrace, Laguna Beach	Founded as a mission in 1908. Became a parish in 1931.
St. Edward the Confessor		33926 Calle La Primavera, Dana Point	Chapel (now dedicated to San Felipe de Jesus) built in 1950 as a chapel-of-ease for Our Lady of Fatima Parish in San Clemente. Became a parish in 1969, current church dedicated in 1994.
St. Timothy		29102 Crown Valley Pkwy, Laguna Niguel	Founded in 1980, current church consecrated in 1999

== Other Catholic parishes ==
Name	Image	Location	Description/Notes
Annunciation		995 N. West St, Anaheim	Byzantine Catholic Church. Parish founded in 1969.
Holy Cross		451 W. Madison Ave, Placentia	Melkite Catholic Church. Founded as a mission in 1973, church consecrated in 1999
St. John Maron		300 South Flower St, Orange	Maronite
St. Thomas Apostle Forane		5021 W. 16th St, Santa Ana	Syro-Malabar

== Former churches ==
- Our Lady of Lourdes, Santa Ana - Absorbed by Our Lady of La Vang in 2006
- St. Callistus, Garden Grove - Parish was redesignated Christ Cathedral after the purchase of the former Crystal Cathedral; the former St. Callistus campus was sold to and used by the former Crystal Cathedral Ministries until 2018.
- St. Isidore, Los Alamitos - Parish established in 1921, moved to new church in Los Alamitos in 1926. Suppressed 1960 in favor of St. Hedwig's. Re-opened for services in 1962, closed 1999 due to earthquake retrofit costs.
