= Jaime Soto =

American Catholic prelate (born 1955)

His Excellency, The Most Reverend Jaime Soto
- Bishop of Sacramento
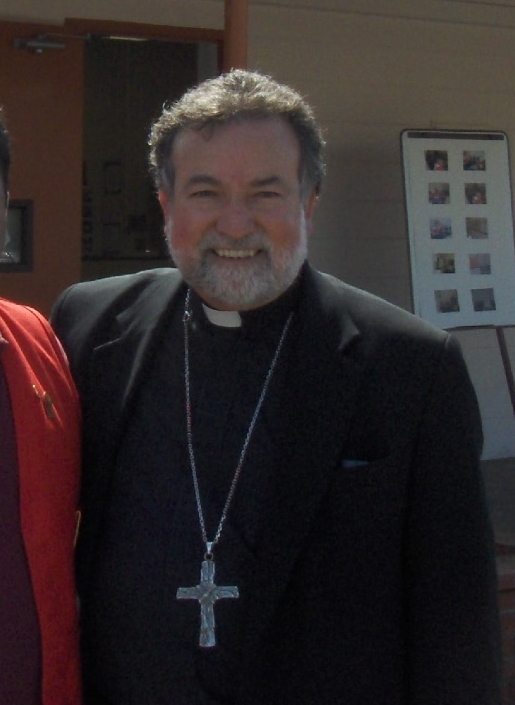
- Bishop Soto on March 19, 2008.
- Church: Roman Catholic
- Diocese: Sacramento
- Appointed: October 11, 2007
- Installed: November 29, 2008
- Predecessor: William Weigand
- Previous posts: Auxiliary Bishop of Orange and Titular Bishop of Segia (2000-2007); Coadjutor Bishop of Sacramento (2007-2008)

Orders
- Ordination: June 12, 1982 by William Robert Johnson
- Consecration: May 31, 2000 by Tod Brown, Michael Patrick Driscoll, and Norman Francis McFarland

Personal details
- Born: December 31, 1955 (age 70) Inglewood, California, US
- Denomination: Roman Catholic
- Education: St. John's Seminary College; Columbia University School of Social Work
- Motto: Gozo y esperanza (Spanish for 'Joy and hope')
- Styles
- Reference style: His Excellency; The Most Reverend
- Spoken style: Your Excellency
- Religious style: Bishop

Jaime Soto (born December 31, 1955) is an American Catholic prelate serving as Bishop of Sacramento since 2007. He previously served as an auxiliary bishop of the Diocese of Orange in Southern California from 2000 to 2007.

== Biography ==
=== Early life and education ===
Soto was born on December 31, 1955, at Daniel Freeman Hospital in Inglewood, California. He is the eldest of seven children of a Mexican family. His father, Oscar Soto, was a telephone company engineer. In 1956, the Soto family moved to Stanton, California, where he attended St. Polycarp School. He also played Mass in his backyard with his siblings, knowing he wanted to be a priest as early as the second grade.

Soto graduated from Mater Dei High School in Santa Ana, California, in 1974. He then entered St. John's Seminary College in Camarillo, California. He obtained a Bachelor of Arts degree in philosophy there in 1978 and a Master of Divinity degree in 1982.

=== Priesthood ===
Soto was ordained to the priesthood in Orange at Holy Family Cathedral for the Diocese of Orange by Bishop William Robert Johnson on June 12, 1982. After his ordination, the diocese assigned Soto as associate pastor of St. Joseph Parish in Santa Ana.

In 1984, Soto traveled to New York City to attend the Columbia University School of Social Work, graduating in 1986 with a Master of Social Work degree. After returning to Orange County that same year, Soto was named associate director of Catholic Charities for the diocese. Later in 1986, he was appointed director of immigration and citizenship services within the local Catholic Charities. Soto was involved with the implementation of the Immigration Reform and Control Act of 1986 as well.

Bishop Norman F. McFarland appointed Soto as episcopal vicar for the Hispanic community in the diocese on March 3, 1989. He was raised by the Vatican to the rank of honorary prelate in 1990. In addition to his work with the Hispanic community, Soto was named diocesan vicar for charities on March 1, 1999.

=== Auxiliary Bishop of Orange ===
On March 23, 2000, Soto was appointed as an auxiliary bishop of Orange and titular bishop of Segia by Pope John Paul II. He received his episcopal consecration at St. Columban Church in Garden Grove, California, on May 31, 2000, from Bishop Tod Brown, with Bishops Michael Driscoll and Norman McFarland serving as co-consecrators. On June 11, 2003, Soto served as a principal co-consecrator for Auxiliary Bishop Dominic Mai Luong.

Soto attended World Youth Day 2005 in Cologne, Germany, joining nine other American bishops in leading catechetical sessions. As auxiliary bishop, Soto counseled Hispanics diagnosed with HIV/AIDS, led monthly services for inmates at the Orange County Men's Jail and promoted such Hispanic rituals and events as the procession of Our Lady of Guadalupe and the Day of the Dead.

=== Coadjutor Bishop and Bishop of Sacramento ===
Soto was named as coadjutor bishop of Sacramento by Pope Benedict XVI on October 11, 2007 to assist Bishop William Weigand. Soto was installed on November 19, 2007, in the Cathedral of the Blessed Sacrament. When Weigand retired on November 30, 2008, Soto automatically succeeded him.

Soto is the Grand Prior of the USA Northwestern Lieutenancy of the Equestrian Order of the Holy Sepulchre of Jerusalem. Soto in August 2020 excommunicated Reverend Jeremy Leatherby for his persistent refusal to recognize Pope Francis as the legitimate pope of the Catholic Church. Leatherby had been removed from public ministry in 2016 after the diocese received an accusation of his having an inappropriate relationship with a woman.

=== USCCB committee positions ===
Within the United States Conference of Catholic Bishops (USCCB), Soto is chair of the Committee on Cultural Diversity in the Church, a member of the Committee on Evangelization and Catechesis, and a consultant to the Committee on International Justice and Peace. He is also the chairman of the Catholic Legal Immigration Network, Inc. (CLINIC).

On November 17, 2010, Soto was appointed head of the Catholic Campaign for Human Development (CCHD), a USCCB agency. The CCHD faced allegations that it funded groups advocating abortion rights, contraception rights, and same-sex marriage. These reports led a coalition of conservative Catholic and anti-abortion groups to launch a boycott of the national collection. At least ten American bishops announced support for the boycott. Soto's appointment came one day after Archbishop Timothy Dolan was elected USCCB president.

== Viewpoints ==
=== Abortion ===
Soto, in January 2024, called for a day of reparation for the "sin of abortion". He asked parishioners to pray and fast in its observance.

=== Immigration ===
In a 2023 editorial, Soto condemned the use of undocumented immigrants as political pawns by politicians after greeting a plane load of them flown to Sacramento by Florida Governor Ron DeSantis.

=== Same-sex relationships ===
In 2008, Soto spoke at a conference for the National Association of Catholic Diocesan Lesbian and Gay Ministries, saying that the "homosexual lifestyle" is sinful. Soto stated:

"Sexual relations between people of the same sex can be alluring for homosexuals but it deviates from the true meaning of the act and distracts them from the true nature of love to which God has called us all. For this reason, it is sinful."

=== Premarital sex ===
In his 2008 speech, Soto spoke against premarital sex, stating:

"Sexual intercourse, outside of the marriage covenant between a man and a woman, can be alluring and intoxicating but it will not lead to that liberating journey of true self-discovery and an authentic discovery of God. For that reason, it is sinful."

=== Racism ===
In July 2020, Soto condemned the toppling of the statue of Catholic missionary Saint Junípero Serra Ferrer in Capitol Park in Sacramento. While condemning the oppression of the indigenous peoples in California by Spanish authorities in the 18th century, Soto claimed that Serra had fought to protect the native people.

== Honors ==
In 2003, Soto was inducted to the inaugural Mater Dei High School Ring of Honor.

== See also ==
- Catholic Church hierarchy
- Catholic Church in the United States

Catholic Church titles
Preceded by William Weigand	Bishop of Sacramento; 2008–present	Succeeded by Incumbent
Preceded by -	Auxiliary Bishop of Orange; 2000-2007	Succeeded by -
