= Dominic Mai Luong =

Vietnamese American Catholic prelate (1940-2017)

His Excellency, The Most Reverend Dominic Mai Luong
- Auxiliary Bishop of Orange
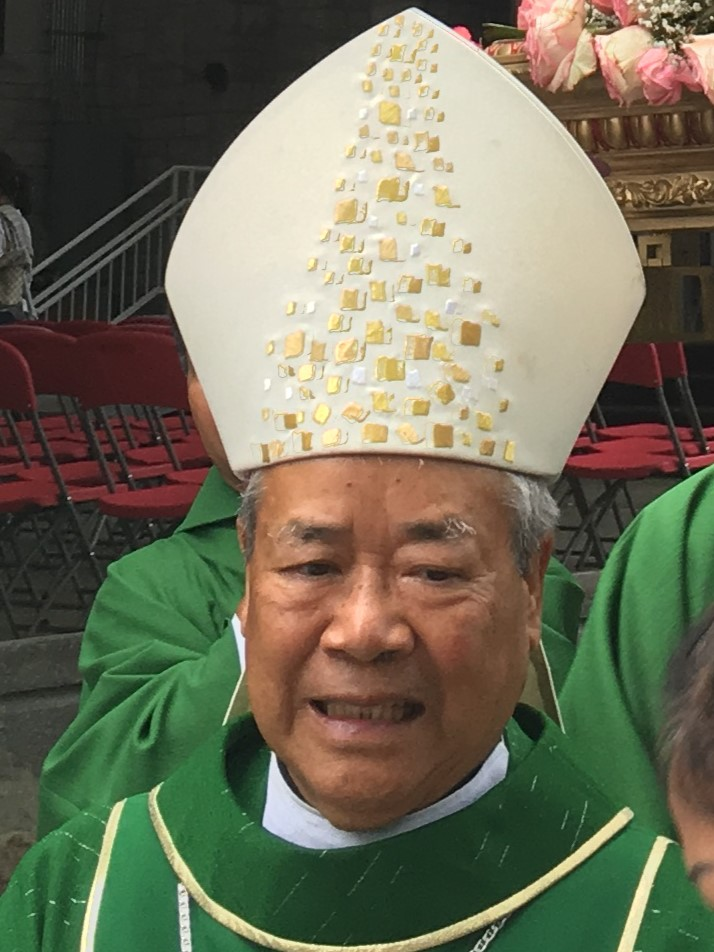
- Luong in 2016 at the Marian Days pilgrimage in Carthage, Missouri.
- Native name: Đa Minh Mai Thanh Lương
- Province: Los Angeles
- Diocese: Orange
- Appointed: 25 April 2003
- Term ended: 20 December 2015
- Other post: Titular Bishop of Cebarades (2003-2017)

Orders
- Ordination: 21 May 1966 by James A. McNulty
- Consecration: 11 June 2003 by Tod Brown, Alfred Clifton Hughes, and Jaime Soto

Personal details
- Born: 20 December 1940 Trực Ninh, French Indochina
- Died: 6 December 2017 (aged 76) Orange County, California, US
- Motto: You are strangers and aliens no longer; (Anh chị em không phải người xa lạ)
- Styles
- Reference style: His Excellency; The Most Reverend
- Spoken style: Your Excellency
- Religious style: Bishop

Dominic Mai Thanh Luong (20 December 1940 – 6 December 2017) was a Vietnamese American Catholic prelate who served as an auxiliary bishop of Orange in California from 2003 to 2015. He was the first Vietnamese bishop in the United States.

== Early life and education ==
Luong was born in Trực Ninh of the province and near the city of Nam Định on 20 December 1940, the youngest of nine children. His father worked as a real estate notary. He received his early education at a French Vietnamese elementary school, and afterwards attended Holy Family Seminary High School.

In 1954, he left home against his father's wishes to enter a seminary in Saigon.

In 1956, he was sent to continue his studies in the United States, where he enrolled at a diocesan seminary in Buffalo, New York two years later. He completed his philosophical and theological studies at St. Bernard's Seminary, Rochester, New York.

== Priesthood ==
On 21 May 1966, Luong was ordained to the priesthood. Although ordained for the Diocese of Đà Nẵng, the increasing violence of the Vietnam War prevented him from returning to his native country.

He pursued postgraduate studies at Canisius College in Buffalo, where he earned a Master of Science degree in biology and psychology in 1967. He then served as a chaplain at a hospital in Buffalo until 1975, when he became a curate at St. Louis Church, also in Buffalo.

In 1976, Luong was incardinated as a priest of the Archdiocese of New Orleans at the invitation of Archbishop Philip Hannan, who assigned him to the spiritual care of Vietnamese refugees in southern Louisiana.

He became an American citizen the following year and was named director of the Vietnamese Apostolate. The parish was initially called Vietnamese Martyrs Chapel, and started as a mobile home. A local landowner later sued the community due to lack of permission to have the mobile home on his property. Luong contacted Hannan, and the archbishop later found a proper location for the chapel, which was later formally established as Mary Queen of Vietnam Church in New Orleans, with Luong becoming the founding pastor in 1983.

In addition to his pastoral duties, Luong was made director of the National Center for the Vietnamese Apostolate in 1989. He was made a monsignor in 1986, and served as a member of the archdiocesan priests' council (1987–92) and dean of New Orleans East (2002–03).

== Episcopacy ==
On 25 April 2003, Luong was appointed auxiliary bishop of the Diocese of Orange, California, and titular bishop of Cebarades by Pope John Paul II. He received his episcopal consecration on 11 June from Bishop Tod David Brown, with Archbishop Alfred Clifton Hughes and Bishop Jaime Soto serving as co-consecrators. He selected as his episcopal motto: "You Are Strangers And Aliens No Longer" (Ephesians 2:19). He became the first Vietnamese American Bishop.

Luong has been an outspoken proponent for the rights of the Catholics in Vietnam. In an interview, he stated that these restrictions on religious freedom caused the laity of the Church in Vietnam to be stuck in a "pre-Vatican II" era, where the lay faithful are not as involved in the life of the Church as they should be in the "post-Vatican II era".

The Vatican announced that his resignation was accepted on 20 December 2015, his 75th birthday.

== Death ==
Luong died on 6 December 2017, at age 77, at Saint Joseph Hospital in Orange County, California.

== See also ==
- Catholic Church hierarchy
- Catholic Church in the United States
- Historical list of the Catholic bishops of the United States
- List of Catholic bishops of the United States
- Lists of patriarchs, archbishops, and bishops

== Episcopal succession ==
Catholic Church titles
Preceded by -	Bishop of Orange; 2003-2015	Succeeded by -
