= Tod Brown =

American Roman Catholic bishop (1936–2023)

His Excellency, The Most Reverend Tod David Brown
- Bishop of Orange
- Diocese: Orange
- Appointed: June 30, 1998
- Installed: September 3, 1998
- Retired: September 21, 2012
- Predecessor: Norman Francis McFarland
- Successor: Kevin Vann
- Previous post: Bishop of Boise (1989–1998)

Orders
- Ordination: May 1, 1963 by Aloysius Joseph Willinger
- Consecration: April 3, 1989 by William Levada, Sylvester William Treinen, and Thaddeus Anthony Shubsda

Personal details
- Born: November 15, 1936 San Francisco, California, U.S.
- Died: October 15, 2023 (aged 86) Orange, California, U.S.
- Education: St. John's Seminary; Pontifical Gregorian University; University of San Francisco
- Motto: Come Lord Jesus

Ordination history of Tod Brown
History
Episcopal consecration
- Consecrated by: William Levada (Portland)
- Date: April 3, 1989
Episcopal succession
Bishops consecrated by Tod Brown as principal consecrator
- Jaime Soto: May 31, 2000
- Dominic Mai Luong: June 11, 2003
- Cirilo Flores: March 19, 2009

Styles of Tod David Brown
- Reference style: His Excellency; The Most Reverend
- Spoken style: Your Excellency
- Religious style: Bishop

Tod David Brown (November 15, 1936 – October 15, 2023) was an American prelate of the Roman Catholic Church. He served as bishop of the Diocese of Boise in Idaho from 1989 to 1998 and as bishop of the Diocese of Orange in Southern California from 1998 to 2012.

Born and raised in Northern California, Brown studied in California and in Rome before being ordained to the priesthood in 1963. As a priest, Brown held several positions in the Diocese of Monterey-Fresno. In 1988, Pope John Paul II appointed Brown as bishop of Boise and he was consecrated in April 1989. He was appointed the third Bishop of Orange in 1998 and held that position until he reached the mandatory retirement age for bishops in 2012.

Brown is known for negotiating a $100 million legal settlement for sexual abuse victims in the Diocese of Orange and for purchasing the Crystal Cathedral for the diocese.

== Biography ==
=== Early life ===
Tod Brown was born on November 15, 1936, in San Francisco to George W. and Edna Anne (née Dunn) Brown, Tod Brown has a younger brother, Daniel. His ancestry includes Danish, Irish, English, and Azorean nationalities.

After receiving his primary education in Northern California, Tod Brown attended Ryan Preparatory Seminary in Fresno, California. He then attended St. John's Seminary in Camarillo, California, where he obtained his Bachelor of Arts degree. Brown studied in Rome at the Pontifical North American College and the Pontifical Gregorian University, there earning a Bachelor of Sacred Theology degree. Brown also earned a Master of Arts degree in biblical theology and education from the University of San Francisco.

=== Priesthood ===
On May 1, 1963, Brown was ordained to the priesthood by Bishop Aloysius Joseph Willinger at St. John Cathedral in Fresno, California, for the Diocese of Monterey-Fresno. During his priestly ministry, Brown served as a parochial vicar, pastor, chairman of the Divine Worship Commission, chairman and member of the Presbyteral Council and Priests Pension Committee, and member of the Diocesan Board of Education. He was chancellor, curial moderator, and vicar general of Monterey as well.

=== Bishop of Boise ===
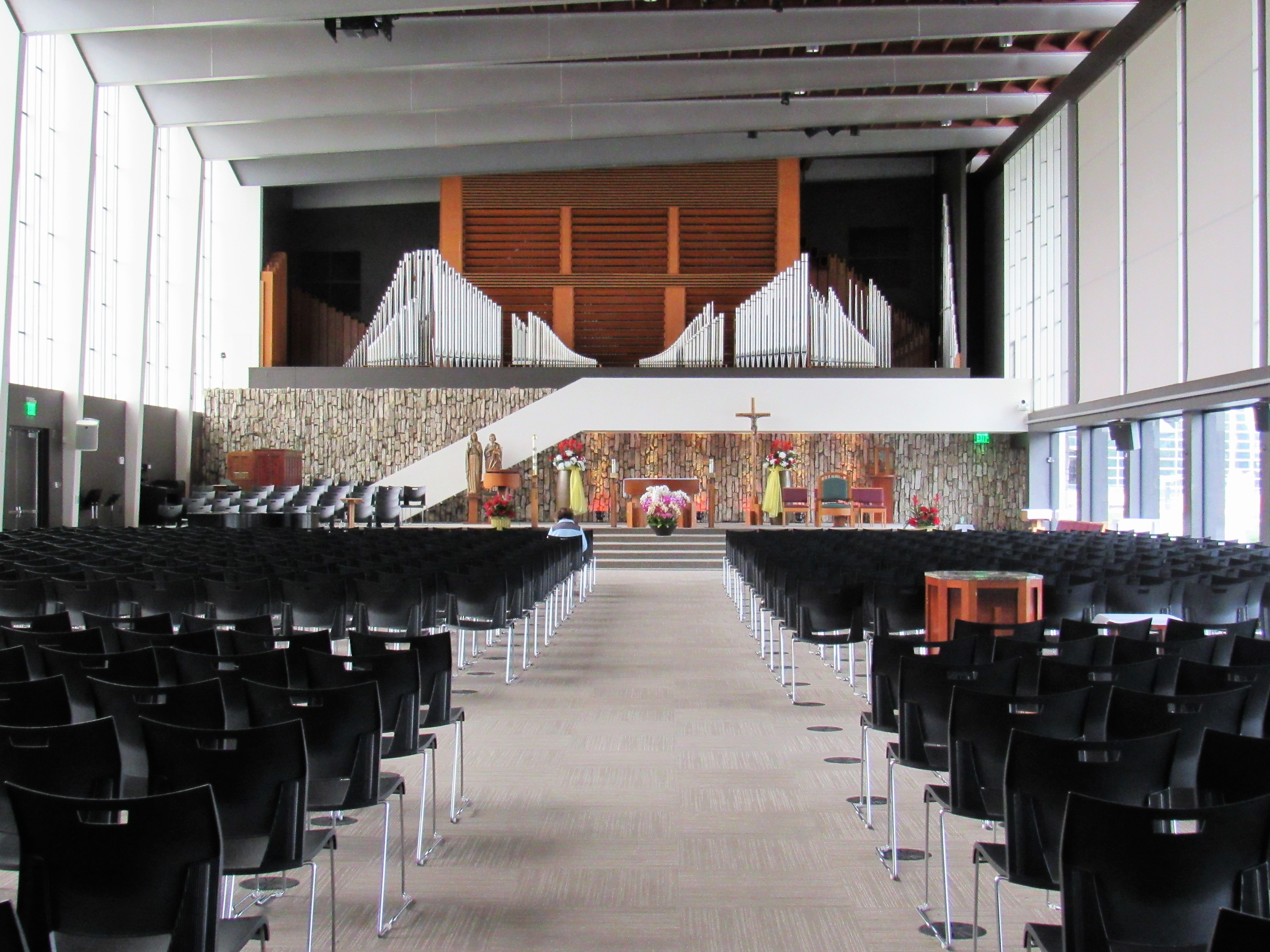
Christ Cathedral, Orange, California (2018)

On December 27, 1988, Pope John Paul II appointed Brown as the sixth bishop of Boise. He was consecrated at the Boise State University Pavilion on April 3, 1989, by Archbishop William Levada, with Bishops Sylvester Treinen and Thaddeus Shubsda serving as co-consecrators bishops. Brown assumed as his episcopal motto, "Come Lord Jesus" (Revelation 22:20).

In February 1993, Brown revealed that Revend James E. Worsley, a priest at Our Lady of the Rosary Parish in Caldwell, Idaho, had voluntarily left his post in that parish. In 1992, parishioner T.J. Hopper had accused Worsley of sexually abusing him over a five-year period. The abuse started on a 1975 camping trip near Idaho City, Idaho. After Hicks' accusations, the diocese transferred Worsley to Our Lady Parish.

In December 1993, Brown and the diocese were named in a lawsuit by two brothers who alleged sexual abuse by Luke Meunier, a priest serving in the diocese. The acts occurred in the 1970s when the boys were minors. Meunier had been previously caught in the act by diocese officials with other boys and been receiving counseling for pedophilia. In court, the diocese legal team successfully argued that since Meunier was actually incardinated, or under the supervision, of a Canadian diocese, the Diocese of Boise was not responsible for his acts.

=== Bishop of Orange ===
On June 30, 1998, John Paul II appointed Brown as the third bishop of Orange. On December 4, 2004, Brown announced a $100 million legal settlement to 87 victims of sexual abuse in the diocese. At that time, it was the largest settlement of sexual abuse claims against the Catholic Church in US history. Brown was an active participant in the settlement negotiations. He made the following statement:

I want to take this opportunity to again extend on behalf of the Diocese of Orange and myself, a sincere apology, a request for forgiveness and a heartfelt hope for reconciliation and healing.

In a 2007 interview with the Orange County Register, Scott Hicks stated that in 1965 Brown, then a priest, sexually abused him several times when Hicks was a 12-year-old at Our Lady of Perpetual Help Parish in Bakersfield, California. The Diocese of Fresno investigated Hicks' accusations in 1997 and found they lacked any credible basis. The case file was turned over to Kern County investigators in 2002, who took no action.

On October 10, 2007, Judge Gail Andler opened a contempt of court hearing on Brown regarding Monsignor John Urell, a diocese official responsible for managing sexual abuse accusations. Brown had sent Urell to a treatment center for priests in Canada despite the fact that Urell was still testifying in court on a sexual abuse case. Brown pleaded not guilty. The contempt citation was later dropped as a condition of a $7 million case settlement. The female victims had been minors at Mater Dei High School in Santa Ana, California, and Santa Margarita High School in Rancho Santa Margarita, California. They had been abused there by lay workers

Within the United States Conference of Catholic Bishops (USCCB) Brown chaired the BCEIA Subcommittee on Interreligious Dialogue and was on the committee for Orthodox-Roman Catholic Bishop's Dialogue and the Pontifical Council on Interreligious Dialogue. He was also a chairman of the Laity Committee and the Committee on Ecumenism and Interreligious Affairs.

In November 2011, the diocese purchased the Crystal Cathedral in Garden Grove, California in bankruptcy court from Robert Schuller Ministries. In a Los Angeles Times article, Brown mentioned that over the years, visiting Catholic clerics from other countries always wanted to visit the cathedral. The article also mentioned that the population of the diocese had doubled during Brown's tenure, increasing the need for more facilities. The facility, renamed Christ Cathedral, was consecrated as the seat of the diocese in 2019.

=== Retirement ===
On September 21, 2012, Brown's resignation as bishop of Orange was accepted by Pope Benedict XVI as Brown had reached his 75th birthday. His replacement was Bishop Kevin Vann, bishop of the Diocese of Fort Worth.

Tod Brown died in Orange, California, on October 15, 2023, at the age of 86.

== See also ==
- Catholic Church hierarchy
- Catholic Church in the United States
- Historical list of the Catholic bishops of the United States
- List of Catholic bishops of the United States
- Lists of patriarchs, archbishops, and bishops

== Episcopal succession ==
Catholic Church titles
Preceded by Norman Francis McFarland	Bishop of Orange; 1998–2012	Succeeded by Kevin Vann
Preceded by Sylvester William Treinen	Bishop of Boise; 1989–1998	Succeeded by Michael Patrick Driscoll
