= Andrew Dũng-Lạc =

Vietnamese Catholic martyr

Saint Andrew Dũng-Lạc
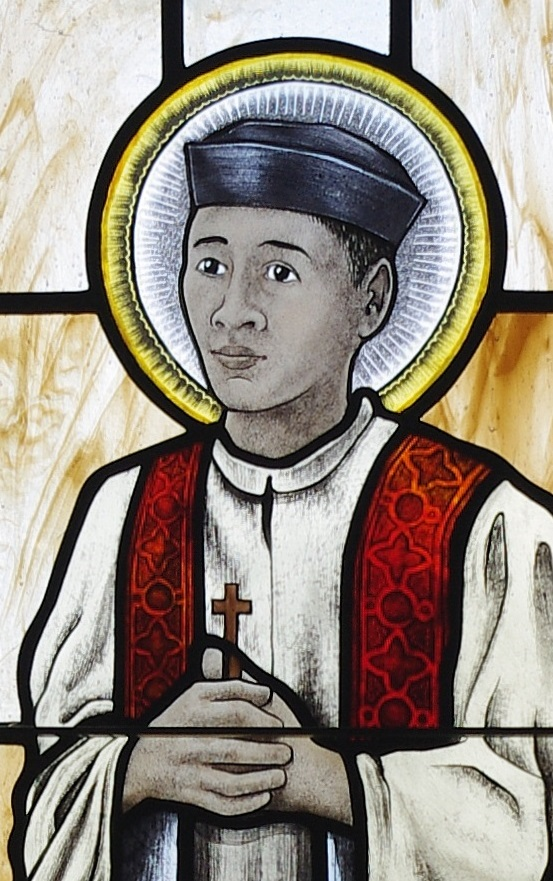
- Andrew Dũng-Lạc, detail from a stained glass window in St. Paul the Apostle Catholic Church, Westerville, Ohio

Martyr
- Born: 1795; Bắc Ninh, Đàng Ngoài, Đại Việt
- Died: 21 December 1839; Hanoi, Bắc Kỳ, Vietnam
- Venerated in: Catholic Church
- Beatified: 21 November 1900, Vatican City by Pope Leo XIII
- Canonized: 19 June 1988 by Pope John Paul II
- Feast: 24 November (General Roman Calendar) 21 December (Roman Martyrology) 10 December (Hanoi)
- Patronage: Diocese of Orange

Andrew Trần An Dũng-Lạc (Vietnamese: Anrê Trần An Dũng Lạc, Vietnamese pronunciation: [aːn˧re˧ tɕən˨˩ aːn˧ zuŋ˧˥ lak˧˨], roughly as "Trun Ahn Zoong Lak"; c. 1795 – 21 December 1839) was a Vietnamese Roman Catholic priest. He was executed by beheading during the reign of Minh Mạng. He was canonized by Pope John Paul II on 19 June 1988 and recognized as one of the 117 Vietnamese Martyrs.

== Biography ==
Trần An Dũng was born in 1795 in the Đại Việt empire, what is now Vietnam, to a poor family in the province of Bắc Ninh, which was in the northern part of Vietnam. At age twelve, his family relocated to Hanoi seeking work, where he encountered a Catholic catechist who provided shelter and instructed him in the Christian faith; he received baptism and the name Andrew. He took the name Andrew at his baptism (Anrê Dũng) and was ordained a priest on 15 March 1823. His preaching and humble life drew many converts, though Christians faced severe persecution under Emperor Minh Mạng, who in 1832 banned foreign missionaries and demanded public renunciation of faith by trampling crucifixes. Arrested in 1835, Dũng Lạc was ransomed by parishioners and adopted a new name, Lạc, while relocating to evade capture, but persecution persisted. In 1839, he was seized again in Hanoi alongside Fr. Peter Thí, whom he had visited for confession; both were ransomed, rearrested, tortured, and beheaded on December 21, and thus he is memorialized as Andrew Dũng-Lạc (Anrê Dũng Lạc). His memorial is 24 November; this memorial celebrates all of the Vietnamese Martyrs of the 17th, 18th, and 19th centuries (1625–1886).Subsequent persecutions inflicted some of Christianity's most brutal martyrdoms on Vietnamese Catholics, including branding with "ta đạo" ("false religion"), confiscation of property, village destruction, and inventive tortures like beheading, suffocation, flaying, or caging. Despite this, the faith endured, establishing deep roots; by the late 20th century, Catholics comprised about 10% of Vietnam's population.

On June 19, 1988, Pope John Paul II canonized Dũng Lạc and 116 companions—117 Vietnamese martyrs total—amid opposition from Vietnam's communist government, which barred official representatives; thousands from the diaspora attended. Their shared feast day is November 24.

== Veneration ==
=== Churches Named after the Saint ===
- St. Andrew Dung-Lac Parish, West Hartford, Connecticut, USA
- St. Andrew Dung-Lac and Companions Parish, Abbeville, Louisiana, USA
- St. Andrew Dung-Lac Parish, Oklahoma City, Oklahoma, USA
- St. Andrew Dung-Lac Parish, Lansing, Michigan, USA
- St. Andrew Dung-Lac Parish, Aloha, Oregon, USA
- St. Andrew Dung-Lac and Companions Catholic Church, Lincoln, Nebraska, USA

== See also ==
- Vietnamese Martyrs
- Catholic Church in Vietnam
