= Isabel Piczek =

Hungarian-American painter (1927–2016)

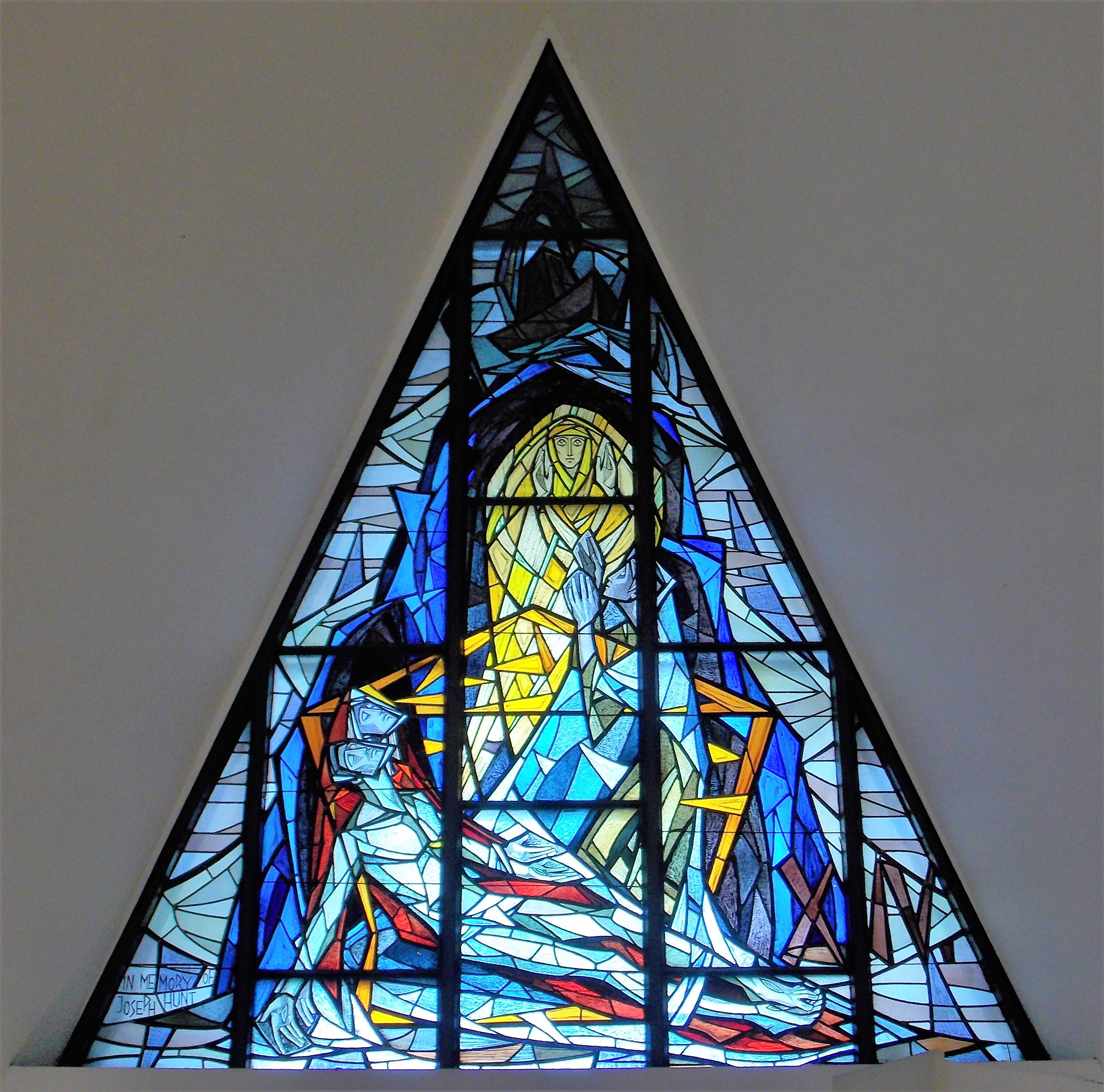
Stained Glass window at Guardian Angel Cathedral, Las Vegas

Isabel Helen Piczek (November 14, 1927 – September 29, 2016) was a Hungarian born ecclesiastical artist perhaps best known for her study of the Shroud of Turin, and who lived in Los Angeles. Her sister, Edith Piczek [died 2012], was also a noted religious artist.

Piczek, and her sister Edith, were born in Hungary, where her father Zoltán Piczek (born 1897) was a noted artist and art professor, and graduated from the Academy of Fine Arts in Budapest. After World War II, the sisters fled to Rome during the Communist dictatorship in Hungary to pursue their work in sacred art. There, whilst still only teenagers, they won a 1949 competition to paint a mural at Rome’s Pontifical Biblical Institute.

By 1955 they were in Canada and shortly after arrived in Los Angeles to pursue their combined talents. In Las Vegas, Edith designed the 2,000 square-foot mosaic on the façade of Guardian Angel Cathedral that illustrated the roles of the Guardian Angel. Isabel created the Stained glass windows that portray the Stations of the Cross for the same church. The two also collaborated on mosaics and the windows for Holy Family Cathedral in Orange, California and artwork in Saint Thomas Aquinas Cathedral in Reno, Nevada. Isabel created a 300 square foot figurative stained glass entrance for the Basilica of the National Shrine of the Immaculate Conception in Washington, D.C.

In 1992, Piczek was honored by Pope John Paul II in recognition of her prolific artistic achievements, examples of which can be found in nearly 500 different cathedrals, churches and other buildings across the world. Cardinal Roger Mahony, Archbishop of Los Angeles, conferred on Piczek admission into the Order of St. Gregory the Great, and the title Dame of Saint Gregory, whereby she became one of only 70 Knights and Dames throughout the world to hold this honor.
