= William Robert Johnson =

American bishop (1918–1986)

His Excellency, The Most Reverend William Robert Johnson
- Bishop of Orange; Titular Bishop of Blera
- Church: Roman Catholic Church
- See: Diocese of Orange
- In office: June 16, 1976 to July 28, 1986
- Successor: Norman Francis McFarland
- Other posts: Auxiliary Bishop of Los Angeles; 1971 to 1976; Titular Bishop of Blera

Orders
- Ordination: May 28, 1944 by John J. Cantwell
- Consecration: March 25, 1971 by Timothy Manning

Personal details
- Born: November 19, 1918 Tonopah, Nevada, US
- Died: July 28, 1986 (aged 67) Orange, California, US
- Education: St. John's Seminary; Catholic University of America
- Motto: Caritas Christi (The love of Christ)

Styles of William Robert Johnson
- Reference style: The Most Reverend
- Spoken style: Your Excellency
- Religious style: Monsignor

William Robert Johnson (November 19, 1918 – July 28, 1986) was an American prelate of the Roman Catholic Church. He served as bishop of the Diocese of Orange in California from 1976 until his death in 1986. He previously served as an auxiliary bishop of the Archdiocese of Los Angeles in California from 1971 to 1976.

== Biography ==
=== Early life ===
William Johnson was born on November 19, 1918, in Tonopah, Nevada, to Jorgen and Marie (née O'Connell) Johnson. In the early 1920s, the family moved to Los Angeles, California, where he enrolled at St. Ignatius School. He attended Los Angeles College, the minor seminary of what was then the Diocese of Los Angeles-San Diego, from 1932 to 1938. He completed his theological studies at St. John's Seminary in Camarillo, California.

== Priesthood ==
Johnson was ordained to the priesthood for the Archdiocese of Los Angeles by Archbishop John J. Cantwell on May 28, 1944 in Los Angeles, California. After several years of pastoral work, Johnson was sent to the Catholic University of America in Washington, D.C., where he earned a Master of Social Work degree. He was named assistant director of the Catholic Welfare Bureau in 1948, and later succeeded Monsignor Alden J. Bell as director in 1956. Johnson was elected to the board of directors for the National Conference of Catholic Charities in 1960, becoming president in 1964.

The Vatican elevated Johnson to the rank of papal chamberlain in 1960 and domestic prelate in 1965. In addition to his duties as director of the Catholic Welfare Bureau, Johnson served as pastor of Holy Name of Jesus Parish, the first Catholic parish for African Americans in Los Angeles, from 1962 to 1968. He was pastor of American Martyrs Parish in Manhattan Beach, California (1968–71), and became parochial vicar for St. Vibiana's Cathedral Parish in 1970.

=== Auxiliary Bishop of Los Angeles ===
On February 19, 1971, Johnson was appointed auxiliary bishop of Los Angeles and titular bishop of Blera by Pope Paul VI. He received his episcopal consecration at St. Vibiana Cathedral in Los Angeles on March 25, 1971, from Archbishop Timothy Manning, with Archbishop Joseph T. McGucken and Bishop Alden Bell serving as co-consecrators. He selected as his episcopal motto: Caritas Christi (Latin: "Charity of Christ"). As an auxiliary bishop, he assisted Archbishop Manning for five years.

=== Bishop of Orange ===
Johnson was named by Paul VI as the first bishop of the newly erected Diocese of Orange on March 24, 1976. His installation took place at the Cathedral of the Holy Family in Orange, California, on June 16, 1976. He celebrated mass with inmates at the Orange County Jail every Christmas, and established a Department of Hispanic Ministries in 1979. Johnson described the Catholic Church before the Second Vatican Council of the early 1960s as "a fairly rigid, centralized structure from the top down to the parish," and declared, "I certainly relish the changes that have occurred in the Church since" the Council. He was an outspoken advocate of nuclear disarmament, and encouraged Catholics to support the settlement of refugees from Southeast Asia.

=== Death ===
Johnson suffered from kidney disease and related illnesses for the last year of his life, eventually forcing him to use a wheelchair. William Johnson died from a bacterial infection at St. Joseph Hospital in Orange, California, on July 28, 1986, at age 67.

Catholic Church titles
Preceded by none	Bishop of Orange; 1976–1986	Succeeded by Norman Francis McFarland
