= Roman Catholic Diocese of Orange =

Latin Catholic ecclesiastical jurisdiction in California, USA

Coordinates: 33.8031°N 117.8320°W

Diocese of Orange in California Dioecesis Arausicanae in California Diócesis de Orange Giáo phận Quận Cam
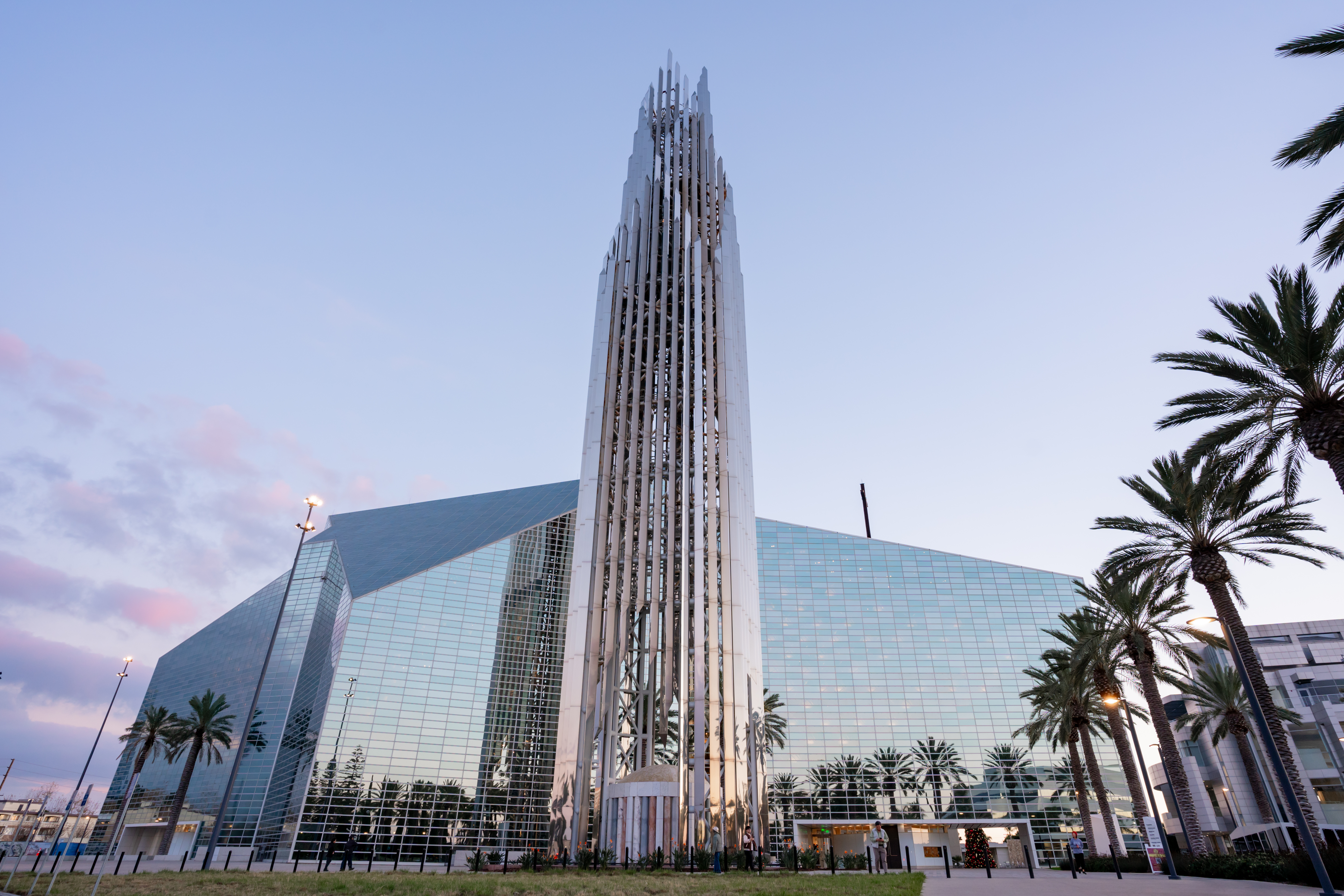
- Christ Cathedral

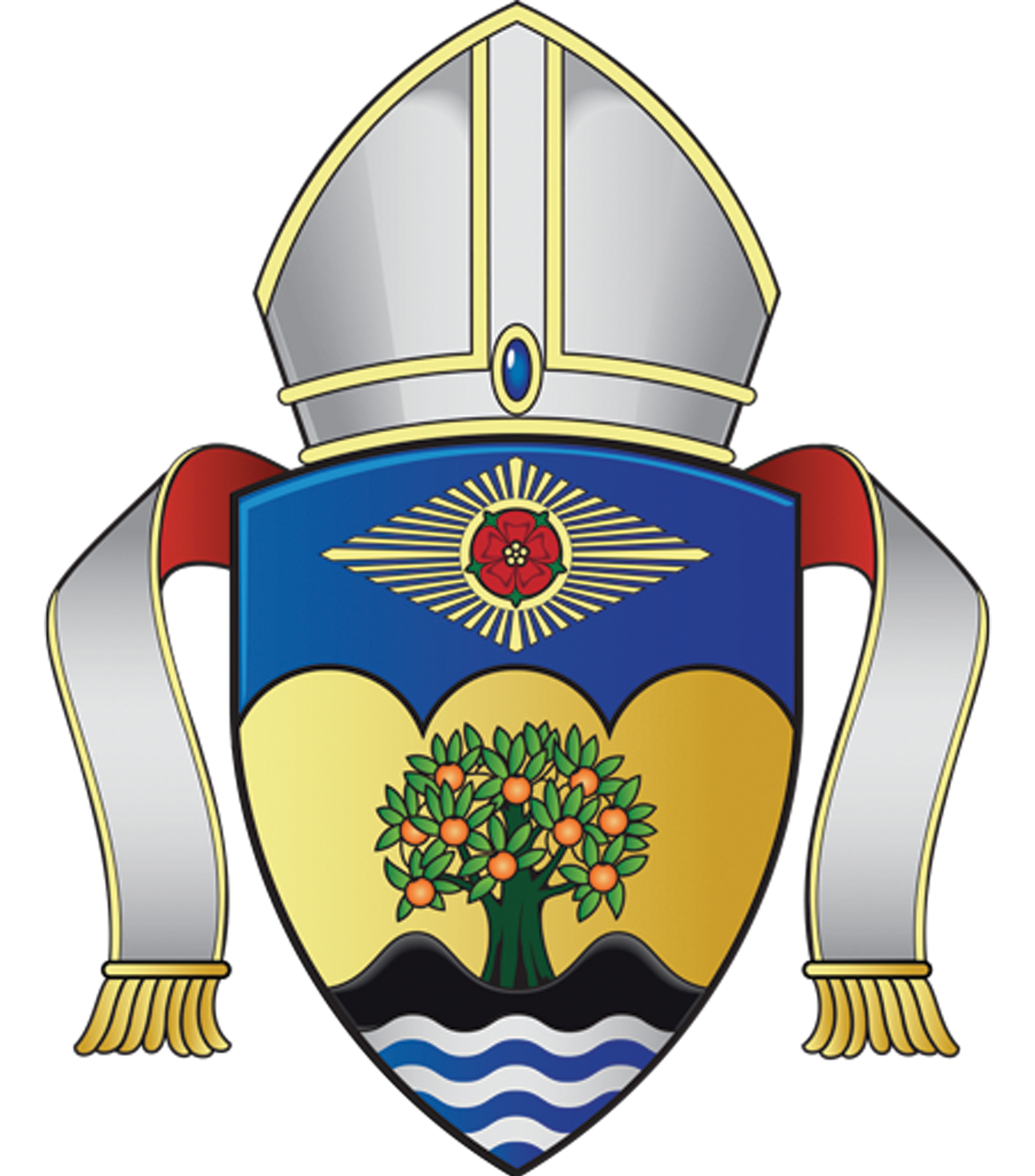
- Coat of arms

Location
- Country: United States
- Territory: Orange County
- Ecclesiastical province: Los Angeles

Statistics
- Population: Total; Catholics: (as of 2024); 3,170,435; 1,360,598 (42.7%)

Information
- Denomination: Catholic
- Sui iuris church: Latin Church
- Rite: Roman Rite
- Established: March 24, 1976
- Cathedral: Christ Cathedral
- Patron saint: Our Lady of Guadalupe; Saint Andrew Dũng-Lạc

Current leadership
- Pope: Leo XIV
- Bishop: Kevin Vann
- Metropolitan Archbishop: José Gómez
- Auxiliary Bishops: Timothy Edward Freyer; Thanh Thai Nguyen
- Vicar General: Timothy Edward Freyer; Thanh Thai Nguyen

Map
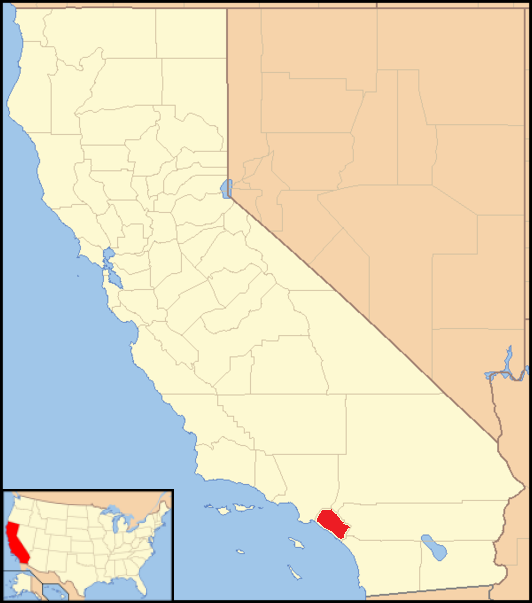

Website
- rcbo.org

The Diocese of Orange in California (Latin: Dioecesis Arausicanae in California; Spanish: Diócesis de Orange; Vietnamese: Giáo phận Quận Cam) is a diocese of the Catholic Church that covers all of Orange County, California, in the United States.

It is a suffragan diocese in the ecclesiastical province of the metropolitan Archdiocese of Los Angeles. The diocesan cathedral is Christ Cathedral in Garden Grove. The Diocese of Orange was erected in 1976, then grew rapidly with immigrants from Asia and Latin America.

As of 2026, the bishop is Kevin Vann. The diocesan patron saints are Our Lady of Guadalupe and Andrew Dũng-Lạc.

== History ==
=== 1700 to 1840 ===
During the 18th century, all of California was a Spanish colony, part of the province of Las Californias in the Spanish Viceroyalty of New Spain. The Catholic presence in present-day Orange County dates to the 1776 founding of Mission San Juan Capistrano by Junipero Serra and the Franciscan order.

In 1804, the Spanish split the province of California into two territories:

- Alta California (Upper California) This included the modern American states of California, Nevada, Arizona, and Utah, along with western Colorado and southwestern Wyoming.
- Baja California Territory (Lower California). This consisted of the modern Mexican states of Baja California and Baja California Sur.

After the end of the Mexican War of Independence in 1821, Mexico took control of Alta California. The Mexican Government in 1835 secularized all of the missions in coastal California, including San Juan Capistrano.

In 1840, Pope Gregory XVI set up the Diocese of California. California. The new diocese included both Alta California and Baja California. Gregory XVI set the episcopal see at present-day San Diego in Alta California. The first bishop of the new diocese was Francisco Garcia Diego y Moreno. Moreno designated the Mission Santa Barbara in Santa Barbara as his pro-cathedral.

=== 1840 to 1900 ===
In 1848, Mexico ceded Alta California to the United States at the close of the Mexican–American War. The government of Mexico then complained to the Vatican about San Diego, now an American city, having jurisdiction over the Mexican parishes in Baja California. In response, the Vatican in 1849 divided the Diocese of California:

- Baja California became a Mexican jurisdiction, an apostolic administration, later an apostolic vicariate (legal predecessor of the current Archdiocese of Tijuana)
- Alta California became the Diocese of Monterey. The Vatican moved the see city from San Diego to Monterey because it was move centrally located. The Royal Presidio Chapel in Monterey became the cathedral of the new American diocese.

Pope Pius IX split the Diocese of Monterey in 1853, erecting the Metropolitan Archdiocese of San Francisco. He designated the Diocese of Monterey as a suffragan diocese of the new archdiocese The Orange County area remained in the Diocese of Monterey.

In 1859, Pius IX changed the name of the diocese to the Diocese of Monterey-Los Angeles due to the growth of Los Angeles. St. Boniface, the oldest continually operating Catholic church in Orange County, was dedicated in Anaheim in 1872.

The Dominican Sisters of Mission San Jose in 1889 established St. Catherine's Academy in Anaheim as a coeducation day school and a boarding school for girls. It also became an ophanage for boys. Today It is a boys school.

=== 1900 to 2000 ===
St. Mary's, the first Catholic church in Fullerton, was dedicated in 1912. The Sisters of St. Joseph of Orange opened St. Joseph Hospital in the City of Orange in 1920. It is today St. Joseph Hospital Orange. The first parish in the City of Orange, Holy Family, was established in 1921.

In 1922, Pope Pius XI suppressed the Diocese of Monterey-Los Angeles, erecting in its place the Diocese of Los Angeles-San Diego and the Diocese of Monterey-Fresno. The Orange County area would remain part of the Diocese of Los Angeles-San Diego, succeeded by the Archdiocese of Los Angeles, for the next 54 years. In 1933, the Sisters of St. Joseph purchased Fullerton General Hospital for $23,000. The Sisters of St. Joseph in 1957 opened St. Jude, a new hospital in Fullerton to replaced Fullerton General, which they had closed in 1953. It is today Providence St. Jude Medical Center.

On March 24, 1976, Pope Paul VI established the Diocese of Orange. Auxiliary Bishop William Johnson of the Archdiocese of Los Angeles was appointed the first bishop. Johnson designated Holy Family Church in Orange as cathedral of the new diocese. Johnson died in 1986; Bishop Norman Francis McFarland of the Diocese of Reno succeeded him the same year. McFarland retired as bishop of Orange in 1998. Bishop Tod David Brown from the Diocese of Boise was appointed by Pope John Paul II that same year to replace him.

=== 2000 to present ===
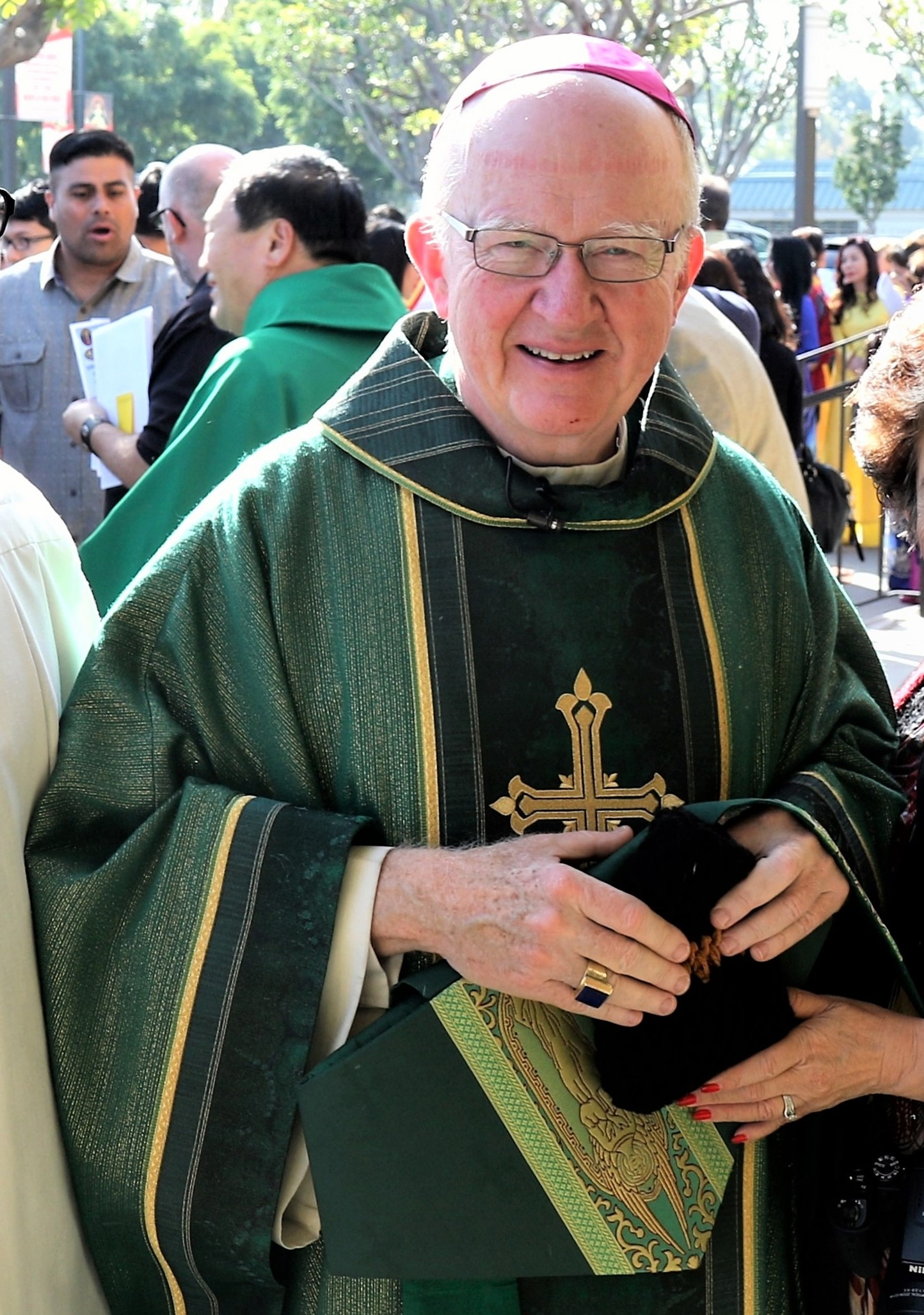
Bishop Vann (2017)

The diocese grew rapidly as the local population swelled with Catholic immigrants from Vietnam, the Philippines, and Latin America. In 2005, Bishop Brown apologized to 87 victims of clergy sexual abuse and announced a settlement of $100 million, following two years of mediation. Additionally, 91 victims received an average of $659,000 each. In 2010, the diocese claimed a Catholic population of over 1.2 million.

In November 2011, the diocese purchased the Crystal Cathedral in Garden Grove, California, in bankruptcy court from Robert Schuller Ministries. In a December 2011 Los Angeles Times article, Brown mentioned that over the years, visiting Catholic clerics from other countries always wanted to visit Crystal Cathedral. The article also mentioned that the population of the diocese had doubled during Brown's tenure, increasing the need for more facilities.

At the mandatory retirement age, Brown retired as bishop of Orange in 2012. The Vatican named Bishop Kevin Vann of the Diocese of Fort Worth to succeed him. The new Christ Cathedral, was consecrated as the seat of the diocese in 2019. In 2020, Vann sued the former administrator of the Orange Catholic Foundation. Vann alleged that the administrator had defamed him by suggesting Vann wanted to obtain funds from the Foundation for COVID-19 pandemic relief, but actually used them for sex abuse claims against the diocese. The diocese in July 2025 opened the Filipino Catholic Center in Anaheim.

Police in September 2025 arrested an Alabama man who drove to St. Michael's Abbey to threaten the religious brothers. His car contained brass knuckles, knives, body armor and high capacity magazines for a firearm. He had previously been sending threatening emails to the abbey.

In November 2025, Vann dedicated the Shroud of Turin Museum at Christ Cathedral, which was funded by private donors and cost $5 million to construct. The museum contains exhibits on the life of Jesus and the Shroud of Turin, which is housed in the Chapel of the Holy Shroud in Turin, Italy.

== Bishops ==
Coat of arms of the diocese prior to 2012

=== Bishops of Orange ===
1. William Robert Johnson (1976–1986)
2. Norman McFarland (1986–1998)
3. Tod David Brown (1998–2012)
4. Kevin Vann (2012–present)

=== Auxiliary bishops ===
- John Thomas Steinbock (1984–1987), appointed Bishop of Santa Rosa in California and later Bishop of Fresno
- Michael Patrick Driscoll (1989–1999), appointed Bishop of Boise
- Jaime Soto (2000–2007), appointed Bishop of Sacramento
- Dominic Mai Luong (2003–2015)
- Cirilo Flores (2009–2012), appointed Coadjutor Bishop and later Bishop of San Diego
- Timothy Edward Freyer (2017–present)
- Thanh Thai Nguyen (2017–present)

== Parishes ==
As of 2026, the Diocese of Orange has 71 parishes and centers.

== Cathedral ==
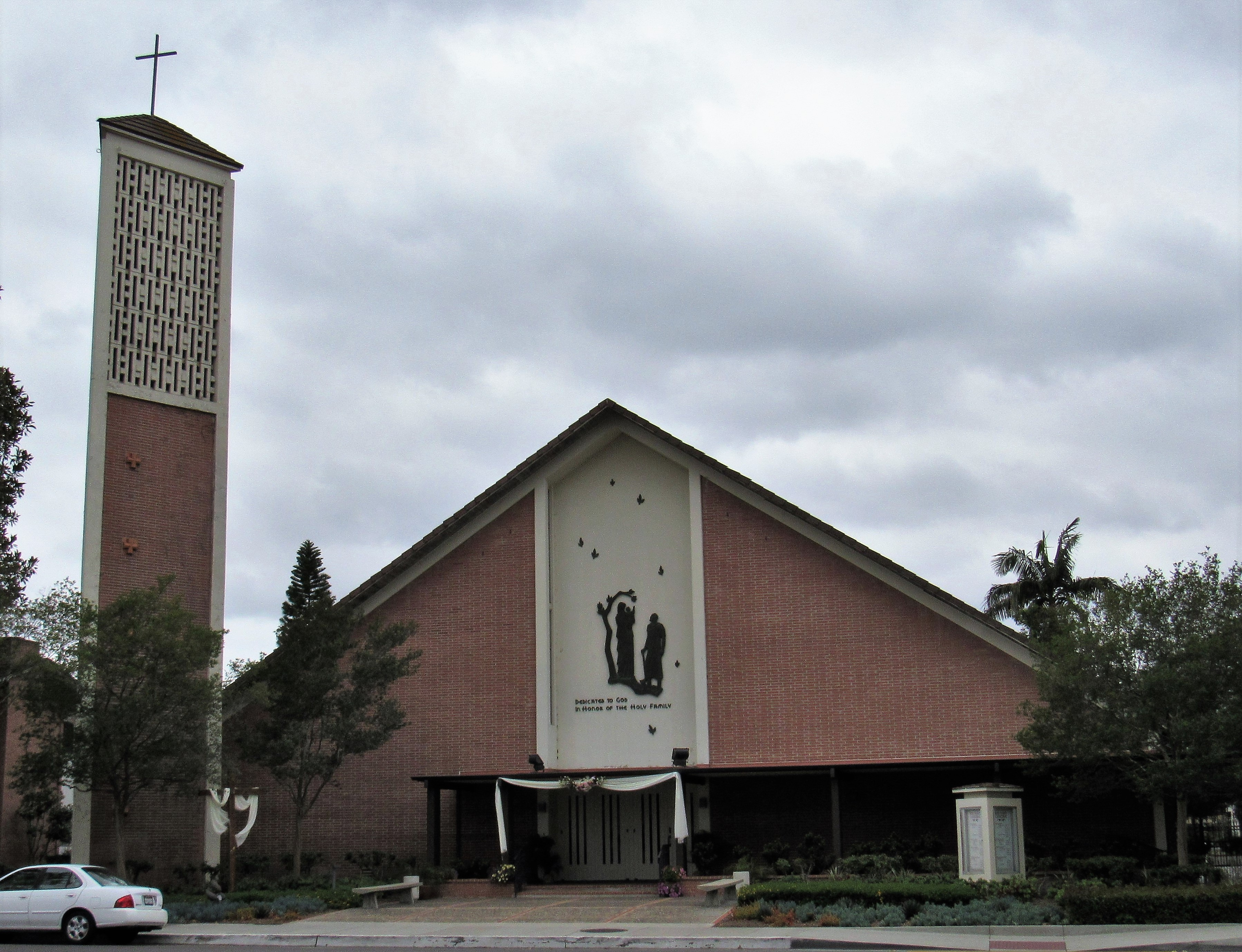
Holy Family Cathedral, Orange (2018)

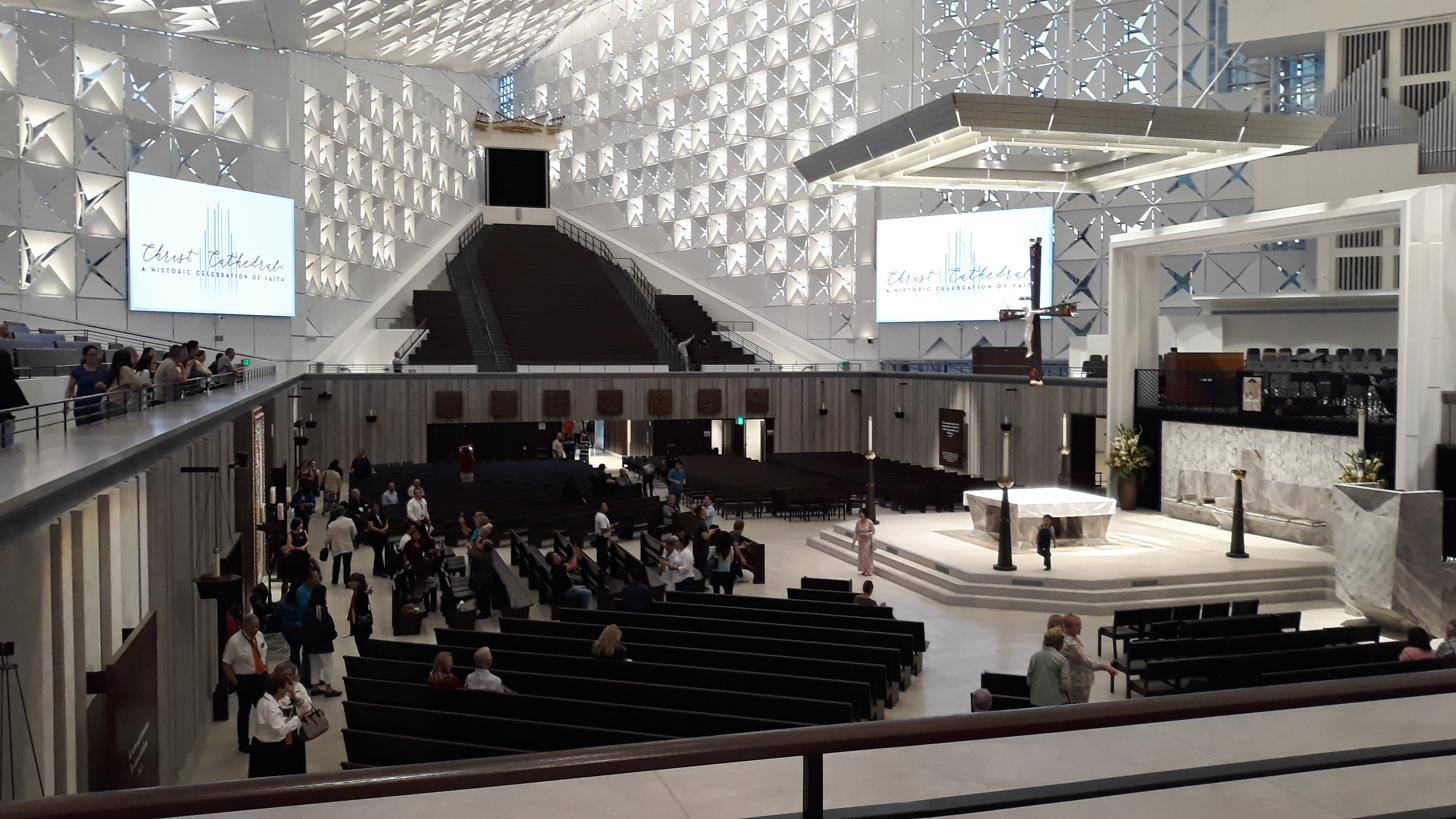
Christ Cathedral, Garden Grove (2019)

In 2001, Bishop Brown first announced plans to build a new cathedral to replace the Cathedral of the Holy Family. However, with the onset of the Catholic sexual abuse scandal in the diocese, Brown deemed it "inappropriate" then to raise funds for a new cathedral. In 2005, the diocese purchased land in Santa Ana and established Christ Our Savior Cathedral Parish, planning to build a cathedral there. The cost of the cathedral project was estimated at $200 million.

In October 2010, Crystal Cathedral Ministries, the Protestant congregation that owned Crystal Cathedral in Garden Grove, filed for bankruptcy protection. Later in 2010, the diocese announced its interest in buying the building and converting it into a Catholic cathedral. The diocese considered the purchase as a potential cost and time-saving alternative over building a new cathedral.

In 2011, a U.S. bankruptcy court judge approved the sale of Crystal Cathedral and its campus to the diocese for $57.5 million; the sale was finalized in February 2012. At that time, the diocese removed "Cathedral" from Christ Our Savior Parish's name, repurposing it as a parish church. In June 2012, the diocese announced that Crystal Cathedral would be renamed "Christ Cathedral". The Vatican had approved the building's new name, fpllowing suggestions from the diocese and its members.

In 2014, the diocese announced a $72 million plan to renovate the cathedral building to meet Catholic liturgy requirements while maintaining its architectural qualities. Construction began in 2017 and was completed in 2019.

== Education ==
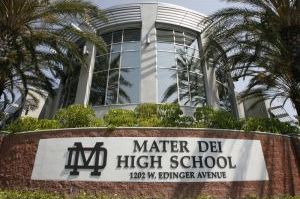
Mater Dei High School (2014)

As of 2026, the Diocese of Orange has 16 pre-schools, 31 elementary school and six high schools serving approximately 17,000 students.

=== High schools ===
==== Diocesan ====
- Mater Dei High School – Santa Ana
- Rosary Academy – Fullerton
- Santa Margarita Catholic High School – Rancho Santa Margarita

==== Independent ====
- JSerra Catholic High School – San Juan Capistrano
- Servite High School – Anaheim
