= Norman Francis McFarland =

American prelate (1922–2010)

His Excellency, The Most Reverend Norman Francis McFarland
- Bishop of Orange; Titular Bishop of Bida
- Church: Roman Catholic Church
- See: Diocese of Orange
- Predecessor: William Robert Johnson
- Successor: Tod David Brown
- Other posts: Bishop of Reno-Las Vegas; 1976 to 1987; Auxiliary Bishop of San Francisco; 1970 to 1976; Titular Bishop of Bida

Orders
- Ordination: June 15, 1946 by John J. Mitty
- Consecration: September 5, 1970 by Joseph McGucken

Personal details
- Born: February 21, 1922 Martinez, California, US
- Died: April 16, 2010 (aged 88) Orange, California, US
- Education: Saint Patrick Major Seminary; Catholic University of America
- Motto: In veritate ambulare (To walk in truth)

Styles of Norman McFarland
- Reference style: The Most Reverend
- Spoken style: Your Excellency
- Religious style: Monsignor

Norman Francis McFarland (February 21, 1922 – April 16, 2010) was an American Catholic prelate who served as bishop of Orange in California from 1987 until 1998. He previously served as an auxiliary bishop of the Archdiocese of San Francisco in California from 1970 to 1976 and the first bishop of Reno-Las Vegas in Nevada from 1976 to 1987.

McFarland's reputation as bishop of Orange has been tainted by documentation proving that he covered up allegations of sexual abuse against minors in the diocese.

== Biography ==
=== Early life ===
Norman McFarland was born on February 21, 1922, in Martinez, California, the third oldest son of Francis and Agnes (Kotchevar) McFarland. He attended public schools in Martinez. After deciding to become a priest, McFarland enrolled at Saint Joseph Seminary, the minor seminary in Mountain View, California. He continued his education at Saint Patrick Major Seminary in Menlo Park, California, earning his Bachelor of Arts degree in 1943.He then remained there to study theology and sacred scriptures.

=== Priesthood ===
McFarland was ordained to the priesthood in San Francisco, California, on June 15, 1946, by Archbishop John J. Mitty for the Archdiocese of San Francisco. After his ordination, the archdiocese assigned McFarland as an associate pastor at St. Andrew's Parish in Oakland, California. Mitty in 1948 sent him to attend the Catholic University of America in Washington, D.C., where he earned a Doctor of Canon Law degree.

After returning to California, McFarland served in several archdiocesan positions, including as a marriage tribunal official.Between 1951 and 1958, he also taught at the San Francisco College for Women in San Francisco. He also served as chaplain to the Saints Cosmas and Damian Guild of Catholic Pharmacists

=== Auxiliary Bishop of San Francisco ===
McFarland was appointed by Pope Paul VI as an auxiliary bishop of San Francisco and Titular Bishop of Bida on June 5, 1970. He was consecrated at Holy Name of Jesus Church in San Francisco on September 5, 1970, by Archbishop Joseph McGucken. His principal co-consecrators were Bishops Hugh Donohoe and Merlin Guilfoyle. McFarland was appointed as the vicar for finance, vicar for seminarians, and pastor-in-residence at Old Mission Dolores in San Francisco

On April 4, 1974, the Vatican dispatched McFarland to Reno, Nevada. At that time, the Diocese of Reno was in a dire financial crisis due to poor investments by the previous bishop. It was facing a bankruptcy filing in eight days unless it could pay $3.2 million in debts. McFarland spent the next week soliciting funds from other dioceses and Catholic organizations. He succeeded in raising $4 million, averting bankruptcy. McFarland continued his work to stabilize the financial standing of the diocese. On December 6th, the Vatican officially named McFarland as the apostolic administrator of Reno.

=== Bishop of Reno and Reno-Las Vegas ===
Paul VI appointed McFarland as bishop of Reno on February 10, 1976. McFarland expanded the funding for the Catholic Charities chapter in the diocese. Recognizing the explosive growth of Southern Nevada, McFarland recommended that the Vatican renamed the diocese. On October 13, 1976, the pope changed the Diocese of Reno to the diocese of Reno-Las Vegas.

Along with his time in Reno and Las Vegas, McFarland made many trips to Catholic communities throughout the large state. Despite the poverty of the diocese, he was able to increase donations to the diocesan branch of Catholic Charities from $360,000 to $4.5 million. He was a frequent contributor to the Frontier Shepherd, the diocesan newspaper.

=== Bishop of Orange ===
McFarland was appointed as bishop of Orange by Pope John Paul II on December 29, 1986, after the death of Bishop William Johnson. McFarland was installed as its bishop on February 24, 1987. In 1995, after hearing McFarland's homily at the red mass for Orange County, several Orange County Bar Association member lawyers formed the St. Thomas More Society of Orange County.

McFarland in February 1998 underwent successful surgery at Hoag Hospital in Newport Beach, California, to repair an aortic aneurysm in his abdomen.

=== Retirement and legacy ===
Prior to his 76th birthday in 1998, McFarland submitted his resignation as bishop of Orange, which was accepted by John Paul II on June 30, 1998. In 2003, McFarland was inducted to the Ring of Honor of Mater Dei High School in Santa Ana, California.

In 2005, the Orange County Register reported that McFarland and other diocesan officials had covered up the sexual abuse of minors by Reverend John E. Ruhl and Thomas Hodgman, choir director at Mater Dei High School.

- In 1992, a man accused Ruhl, the pastor of St. Joseph Parish in Placentia, California, of sexually abusing him as a boy in 1976 as St. Vincent de Paul Seminary in Montebello, California. McFarland immediately removed him from the parish. Ruhl confirmed to McFarland that he had wrapped duct tape around the boy's genitals to prevent him from masturbating. McFarland did not inform the parish about this crime.
- Hodgman in 1989 admitted to the Mater Dei principal that he had sexual relationships with two girls and impregnated one of them. After Hodgman left his employment, the diocese instructed school employees to not mention the sexual abuse allegations.

Norman McFarland died of a heart attack at his home in Orange, California, on April 16, 2010. His mass of the resurrection was held at Holy Family Cathedral in Orange on April 23, 2010. He is buried in Holy Sepulchre Cemetery in Orange.

== Episcopal succession ==
Ordination history of Norman Francis McFarland
History
Episcopal consecration
- Consecrated by: Joseph McGucken
Episcopal succession
Bishops consecrated by Norman Francis McFarland as principal consecrator
- Michael Patrick Driscoll: March 6, 1990

McFarland's direct apostolic succession is delineated from Cardinal Scipione Rebiba. Over 91% of the world's more than 4,000 Catholic bishops alive today trace their episcopal lineage back to Rebiba.

== Sources ==
- The Roman Catholic Diocese of Orange www.rcbo.org Retrieved: 2010-04-20.
- The Most Reverend Norman Francis McFarland, D.D., J.C.D. www.rcbo.org Retrieved: 2010-04-20.

Catholic Church titles
Preceded by Michael Joseph Green	Bishop of Reno-Las Vegas; 1976–1986	Succeeded by Daniel F. Walsh
Preceded by William Robert Johnson	Bishop of Orange; 1986–1998	Succeeded by Tod David Brown
