= Incardination and excardination =

Catholic law tying clergy to a superior

Incardination is the formal term in the Catholic Church for a cleric being under a bishop or other ecclesiastical superior. It is also sometimes used to refer to laity who may transfer to another part of the church. Examples include transfers from the Western Latin Church to an Eastern Catholic Church, or from a territorial diocese to one of the three personal ordinariates for former Anglicans. Its antonym, excardination, denotes that a member of the clergy has been freed from one jurisdiction and is transferred to another.

== Tied to diocese or superior ==
As one part of the hierarchy of the Catholic Church, every Catholic priest or deacon must have an ordinary as a superior. Such an ordinary is most often a diocesan bishop, but can also be a leader of a religious order, such as the Jesuits or Franciscans, or some other ecclesiastical superior.

The purpose of incardination is to ensure that no cleric is "freelance", without a clear ecclesiastical superior to whom the cleric is accountable and who in turn is responsible for the cleric.

== Canon law ==
The Second Vatican Council recognised that the global distribution of priests in the 1960s was uneven, and invited priests in dioceses which were "rich in vocations" to offer, subject to permission from their bishop, to serve in "regions, missions or endeavors which are poor in numbers of clergy", and to this end, ordered that "present norms of incardination and excardination should be so revised that, while this ancient institution still remains intact, they will better correspond to today's pastoral needs".

Incardination in the Latin Church is dealt with in canons 265–272 of the 1983 Code of Canon Law, and there is a similar canonical institution in the law of the Eastern Catholic Churches, which appears in the Code of Canons of the Eastern Churches, Title X «Clerics», Chapter II «Ascription of Clerics to an Eparchy», Canons 357–366.

Incardination does not cease until the moment when that cleric is incardinated as a subject of another superior. An excardination from one diocese, for instance, does not become effective until the moment of incardination to another, so there is no gap during which the clergyman is not clearly answerable to a definitely determined superior.

A priest or deacon may move from diocese to diocese taking a new position, including moving to a new country, while formally still being incardinated in his original diocese, and therefore still under the supervision of his original diocese's bishops, at least formally, by canon law. For instance, a Philippine diocesan priest may be assigned to a parish in the United States for decades but still be formally incardinated in his original Philippine diocese.

== Civil law ==
Questions of civil jurisdiction can come into conflict with canon law in situations where a priest is on temporary assignment remotely while he remains incardinated to his diocese of origin. This applied in the case of a French priest involved in a car accident which killed two people, while at his temporary post in California. The question arose in a civil suit, whether the Diocese of Fresno (California), where he was working, was responsible legally although the priest remained incardinated in France (Stevens v. Roman Catholic Bishop of Fresno). The civil court ruled that it was.

== Terminology ==
Both "incardination" and "excardination" are derived from the Latin cardo (pivot, socket, or hinge), from which the word cardinal is also derived: hence the Latin verbs incardinare (to hang on a hinge or fix) and excardinare (to unhinge or set free).

== Procedures ==
During an ordination ceremony, prior to the actual sacrament of Holy Orders itself, the man places himself under a promise of obedience to his bishop or other ordinary of a particular church, or makes an acknowledgment of a pre-existing vow of obedience to a prior, abbot, or other superior in an institute of consecrated life or society of apostolic life.
