= Kevin Vann =

American Catholic prelate (born 1951)

His Excellency, The Most Reverend Kevin Vann KC*HS
- Bishop of Orange
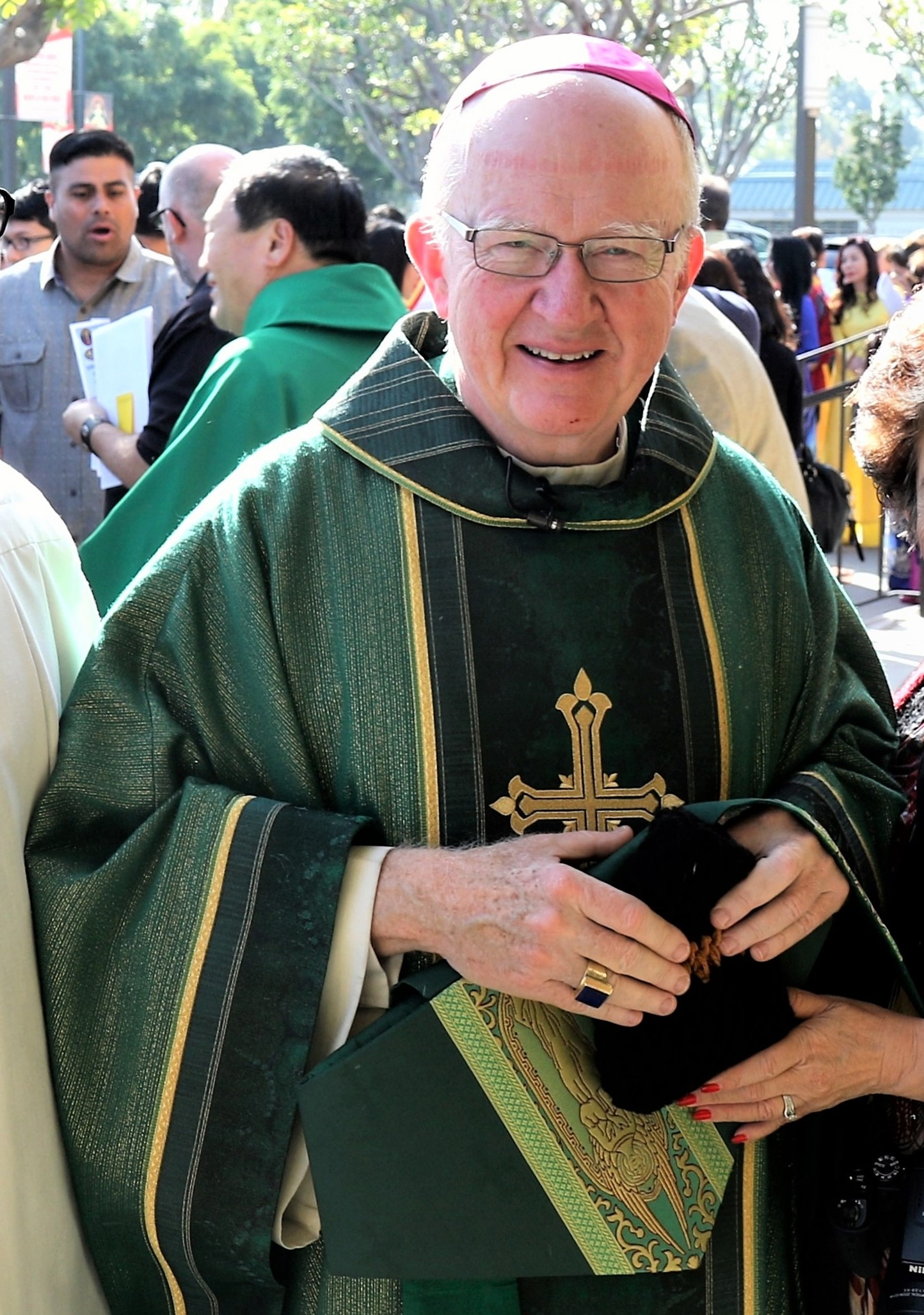
- Vann in 2017
- Diocese: Orange
- Appointed: September 21, 2012
- Installed: December 10, 2012
- Predecessor: Tod Brown
- Other post: Ecclesiastical Delegate, Pastoral Provision (2011–)
- Previous posts: Bishop of Fort Worth (2005–2012); Coadjutor Bishop of Fort Worth (2005)

Orders
- Ordination: May 30, 1981 by Joseph Alphonse McNicholas
- Consecration: July 13, 2005 by José Horacio Gómez, Raymond Leo Burke, George Joseph Lucas

Personal details
- Born: Kevin William Vann; May 10, 1951 (age 75) Springfield, Illinois, US
- Parents: William Vann; Theresa Jones
- Education: Springfield College in Illinois; Millikin University (BS); Kenrick-Glennon Seminary (MDiv); Pontifical University of Saint Thomas Aquinas (JCD)
- Motto: In fide et dileccione in Christo Iesu (Latin for 'In the faith and love in Christ Jesus')
- Styles
- Reference style: His Excellency; The Most Reverend
- Spoken style: Your Excellency
- Religious style: Bishop

Kevin William Vann (born May 10, 1951) is an American Catholic prelate serving as Bishop of Orange in California since 2012. Vann previously served as Bishop of Fort Worth in Texas from 2005 to 2012.

Vann is the ecclesiastical delegate for the Pastoral Provision for former Anglican priests.

== Early life and education ==
The eldest of six children, Kevin William Vann was born on May 10, 1951, in Springfield, Illinois, to William and Theresa (née Jones) Vann. William was a postal worker and Theresa a nurse and clinical instructor at St. John's Hospital in Springfield.

After graduating from Griffin High School in Springfield, Vann entered Springfield College. In 1974, he obtained a Bachelor of Science degree in medical technology from Millikin University in Decatur, Illinois. After graduating from Millikin, Vann worked as a medical technologist at St. John's Hospital.

In 1976, after deciding to become a priest, Vann entered the Immaculate Conception Diocesan Seminary in Springfield. He then went to Kenrick-Glennon Seminary in St. Louis, Missouri one year later, finishing there in 1981

== Priesthood ==
Vann was ordained to the priesthood for the Diocese of Springfield in Illinois by Bishop Joseph McNicholas at the Cathedral of the Immaculate Conception in Springfield on May 30, 1981. After his 1981 ordination, Vann traveled to Rome to resided at the Pontifical North American College while studying in that city. He was awarded a Doctor of Canon Law degree from the Pontifical University of St. Thomas Aquinas in Rome in early 1985. During his time at the Pontifical University of St. Thomas Aquinas, he became a classmate of Rev. Robert Prevost, OSA, who would later become Pope Leo XIV.

After Vann's return to Springfield in 1985, the diocese assigned him as parochial vicar at Blessed Sacrament Parish. During this time, he served as judge, defender of the bond, and procurator on the diocesan tribunal from 1985 to 1994, also serving on the metropolitan court of appeals for the Province of Chicago. Between 1989 and 1990, Vann was also parochial administrator of St. Mary Parish in Pittsfield, Illinois, Holy Redeemer Parish in Barry, Illinois, and Holy Family Parish in Griggsville, Illinois.

Vann was pastor of St. Benedict Parish in Auburn, Illinois (1990–1992) and later of Our Lady of Lourdes Parish in Decatur, Illinois (1992–2001). While serving at Our Lady of Lourdes, he was also:

- Judicial vicar for the Inter-diocesan Tribunal of Second Instance for the Province of Chicago (1994–2005)
- Parochial administrator of St. Isidore Parish in Bethany, Illinois, Sacred Heart Parish in Dalton City (1995–1997), and Our Lady of the Holy Spirit Parish in Mount Zion (1995)
- Dean of the Decatur deanery from 1996 to 2001
- Bishop's contact for the Hispanic ministry in 1999

Vann also taught canon law at Kenrick-Glennon Seminary.

Vann became pastor of Blessed Sacrament Parish in 2001. During his tenure at Blessed Sacrament, he oversaw a $2.2 million capital campaign for refurbishing the church, as part of its 75th anniversary celebration. In addition to his pastoral duties, he was also named vicar for clergy in the diocesan chancery. The Vatican elevated Vann to the rank of honorary chaplain in 2002. In 2004, Vann, along with Bishop George Lucas, prohibited Senator Dick Durbin from receiving communion due to his positions on abortion.

== Coadjutor Bishop and Bishop of Fort Worth ==
On May 17, 2005, Vann was appointed coadjutor bishop of Fort Worth by Pope Benedict XVI to assist Bishop Joseph Delaney, who was in poor health. Delaney died on July 12, 2005, the day before Vann was to be consecrated as coadjutor bishop. The episcopal ordination went on as scheduled, and on July 13, 2005, Vann was consecrated as Bishop of Fort Worth.

Archbishop José Gómez served as his consecrator, with Archbishop Raymond Burke and Bishop George Lucas serving as co-consecrators, at the Daniel-Meyer Coliseum in Fort Worth. Vann selected as his episcopal motto In Fide Et Dileccione In Christo Iesu, "In the faith and love in Christ Jesus".

== Bishop of Orange ==
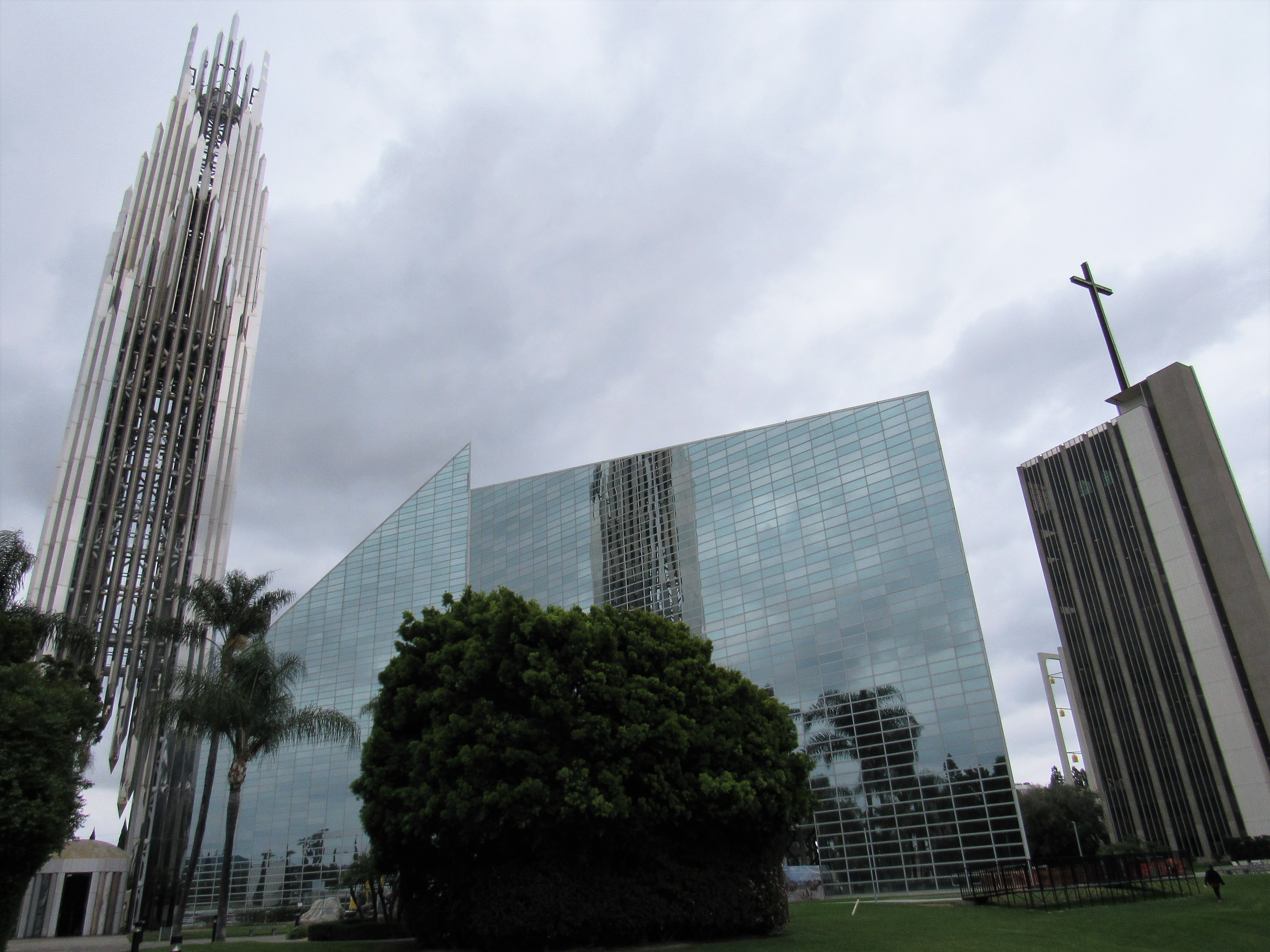
Christ Cathedral, Garden Grove, California (2018)

On September 21, 2012, Pope Benedict XVI appointed Vann as bishop of Orange to succeed the retiring Bishop Tod Brown. Vann was installed on December 10, 2012.

In July 2019, Vann dedicated Christ Cathedral in Garden Grove, California. Originally serving as the Crystal Cathedral, the diocese purchased the building in early 2012 from the bankrupt Robert Schuller ministries. On November 1, 2020, Vann sued the former administrator of the Orange Catholic Foundation. Vann claimed that the administrator had defamed him by suggesting Vann wanted to obtain funds from the foundation for COVID-19 pandemic relief, but actually use them for sex abuse claims against the diocese.

Vann speaks Spanish and Vietnamese. Within the United States Conference of Catholic Bishops (USCCB), Vann has been a member of the committees on marriage, family life, laity and youth, and the subcommittee on marriage and family life.

== Viewpoints ==
=== Abortion ===
In 2004, Vann said that he would be "reticent" in giving communion to US Senator Dick Durbin (D-IL), a former parishioner at Blessed Sacrament, whose "pro-choice position puts him really outside of communion or unity with the Church's teachings on life".

During the 2008 US presidential election, Vann and Bishop Kevin Farrell issued a joint statement in which they declared that

"We cannot make more clear the seriousness of the overriding issue of abortion—while not the only issue—it is the defining moral issue, not only today, but of the last 35 years ... As Catholics we are morally obligated to pray, to act, and to vote to abolish the evil of abortion in America."

== See also ==
- Catholic Church hierarchy
- Catholic Church in the United States
- Historical list of the Catholic bishops of the United States
- List of Catholic bishops of the United States
- Lists of patriarchs, archbishops, and bishops

== Episcopal succession ==
Catholic Church titles
Preceded by Tod David Brown	Bishop of Orange; 2012–present	Incumbent
Preceded by Joseph Patrick Delaney	Bishop of Fort Worth; 2005–2012	Michael Fors Olson
