= Holy Family Catholic Church (Orange, California) =

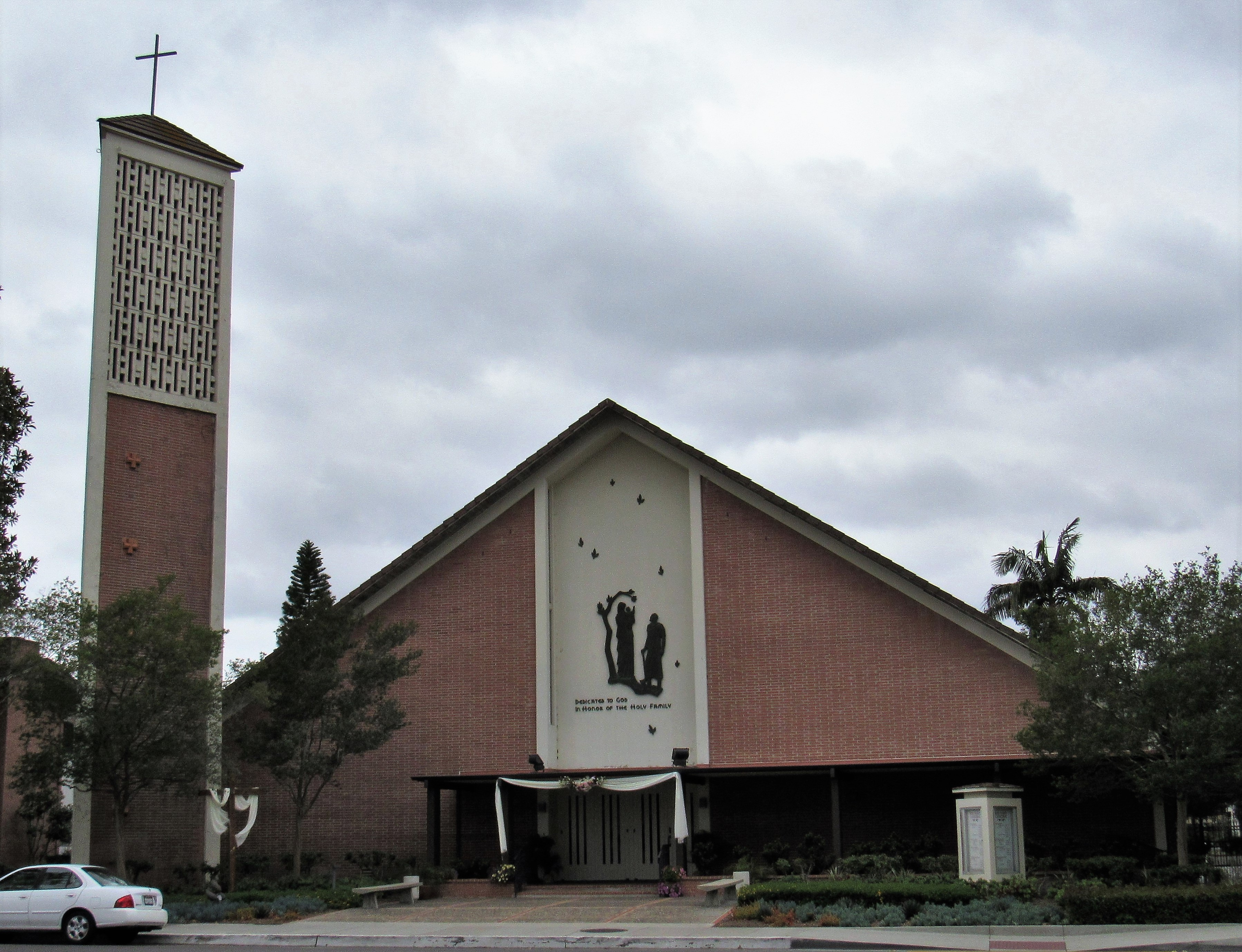

- Location in Southern California
- 33°46′47″N 117°51′13″W
- Location: 566 S. Glassell St. Orange, California
- Country: United States
- Denomination: Catholic
- Website: hforange.org

History
- Status: Parish church
- Founded: 1921
- Dedication: January 8, 1961

Architecture
- Style: Modern
- Completed: 1958

Specifications
- Materials: Brick

Administration
- Diocese: Orange

Clergy
- Bishop: Kevin Vann
- Pastor: Sy Nguyen

Holy Family Catholic Church, located in Orange, California, United States, is a parish church in the Diocese of Orange. It served as the cathedral of that diocese, from the diocese's establishment in 1976, until Christ Cathedral in Garden Grove, California, the former Crystal Cathedral, was dedicated on July 17, 2019. Because of this, Holy Family Cathedral changed its name to Holy Family Catholic Church. Holy Family Parish predates the establishment of the Diocese of Orange.

== History ==
The first Mass in what is now the Holy Family Parish is believed to have been celebrated by a Spanish expeditionary force in 1769. Holy Family Parish was established in 1921, and the first Mass was celebrated on December 18 of the same year. Orange was part of what was then known as the Diocese of Monterey-Los Angeles. The original church received a remodeling in 1930 that gave it a Mission Revival appearance. The site for the present parish buildings was purchased in 1949 and the current church building was completed in April 1958. The church was dedicated in January 1961. The church was selected to be the diocesan cathedral when Orange County was split from the Archdiocese of Los Angeles to form the Diocese of Orange in June 1976. It served as the cathedral until Christ Cathedral was dedicated on July 17, 2019. In December 2020, Holy Family changed its name to Holy Family Catholic Church, while still being considered the first cathedral of the Diocese of Orange.

== Art ==
Mosaics in the cathedral were created by Los Angeles-based Hungarian artist Isabel Piczek, and the stained glass windows were created by her sister Edith. The tabernacle, located to the north of the altar, is the work of German artist Egino Günther Weinert. Composed of six enamel cloisonné panels that depict Eucharistic images, it was commissioned by Monsignor Art Holquin when the church's interior was being renovated. Holquin was able to acquire the last tabernacle created by Weinert for Christ Cathedral.

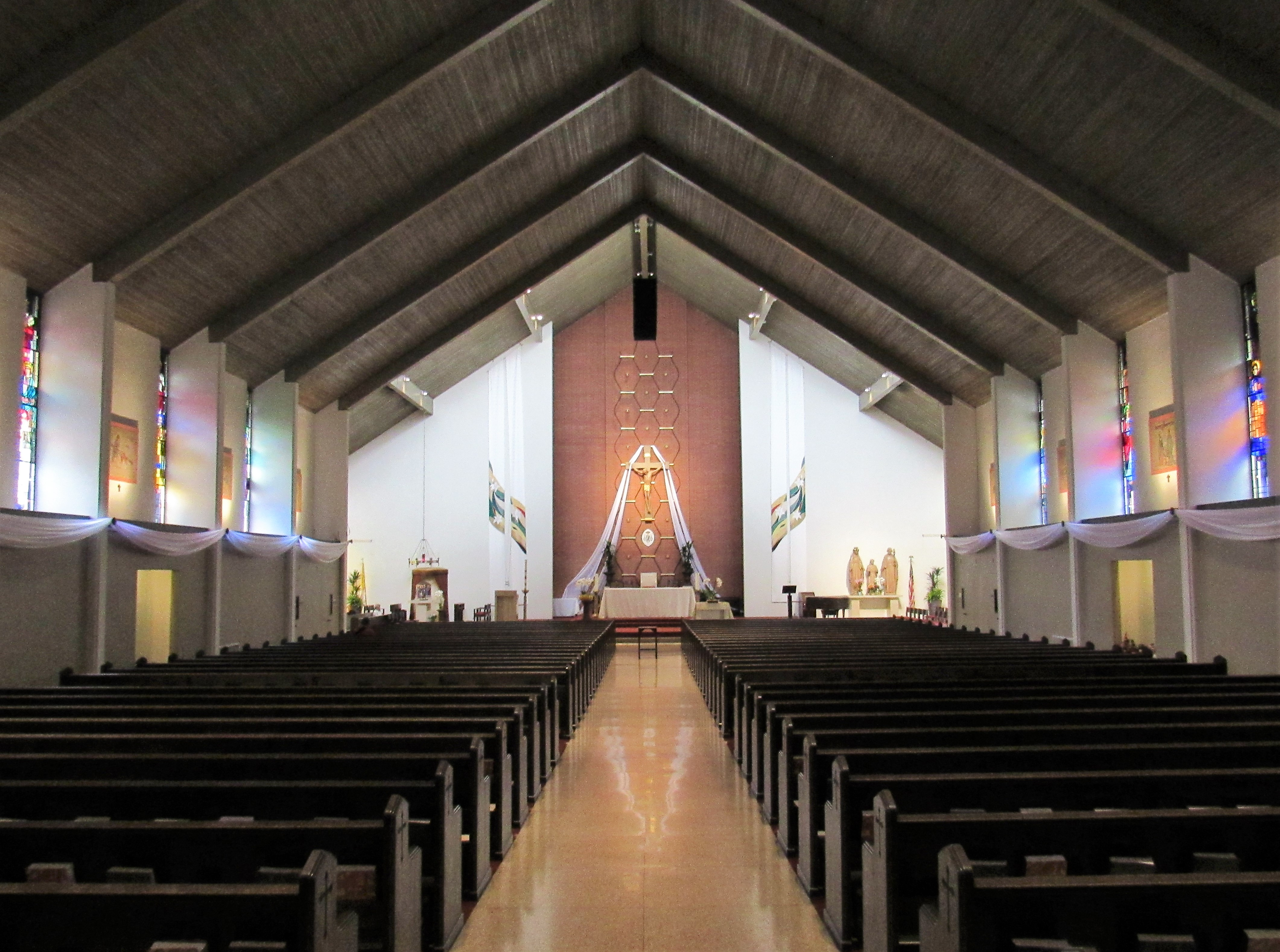
Main nave toward altar

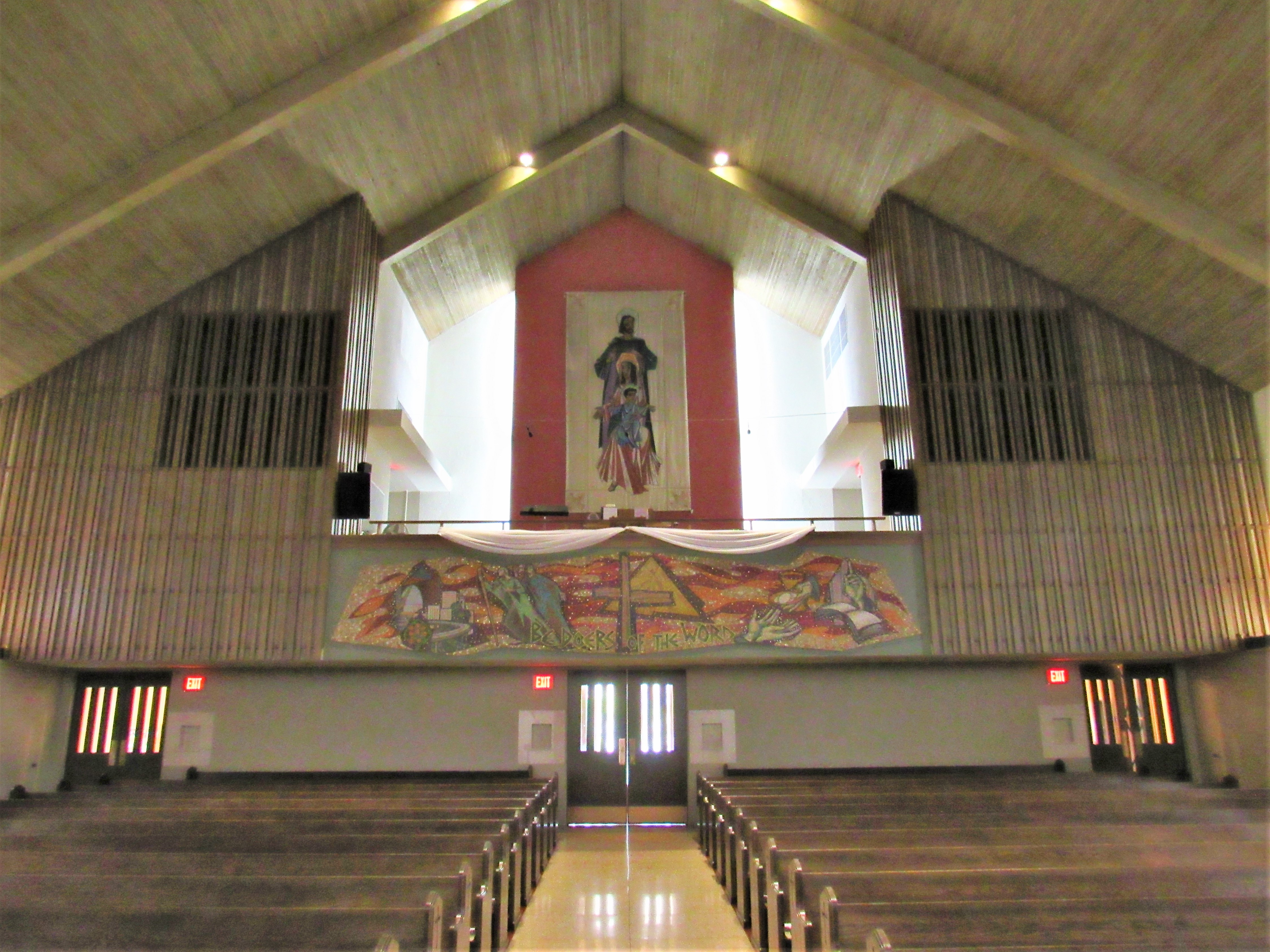
Main nave toward gallery

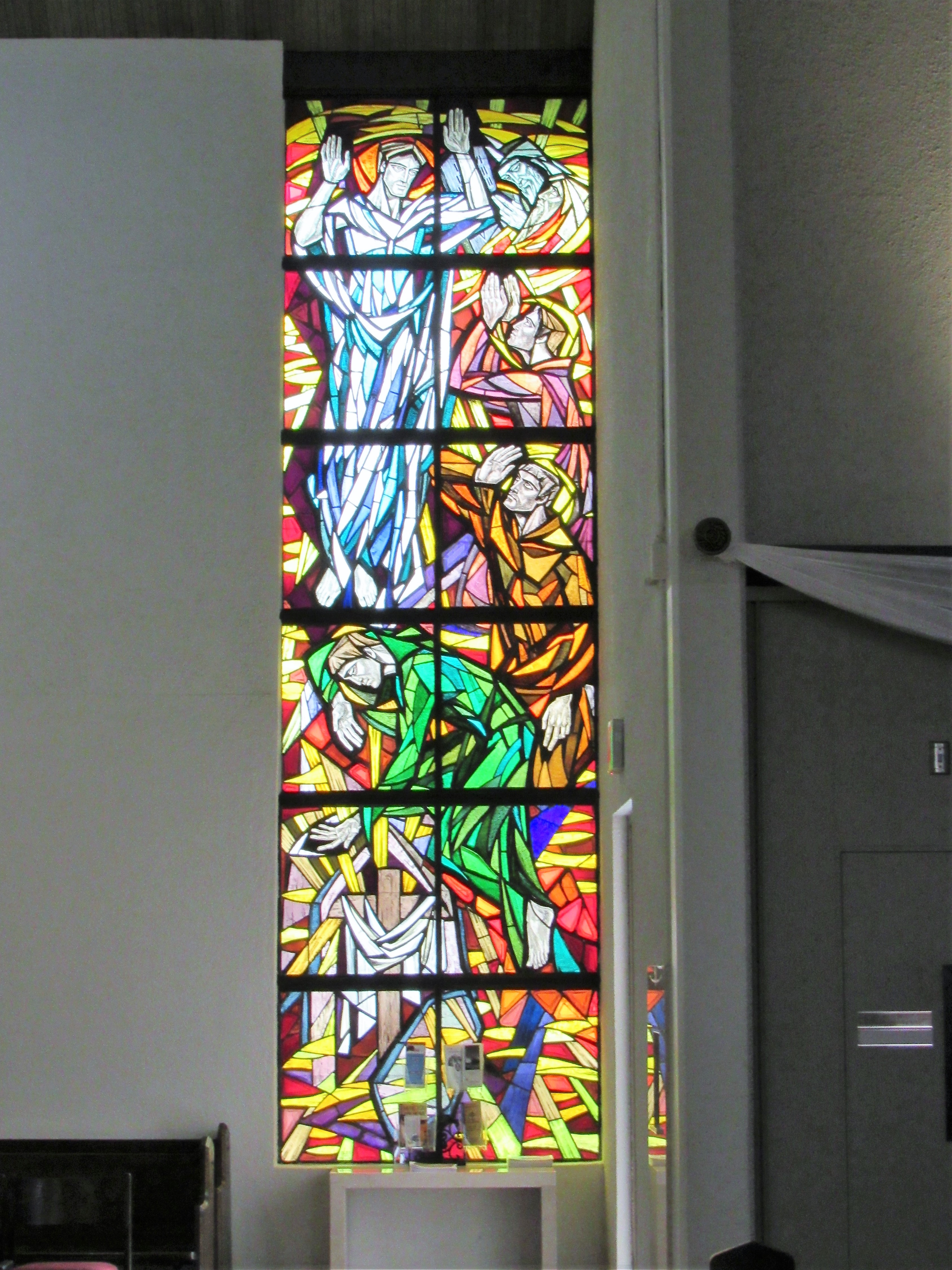
Stained glass window

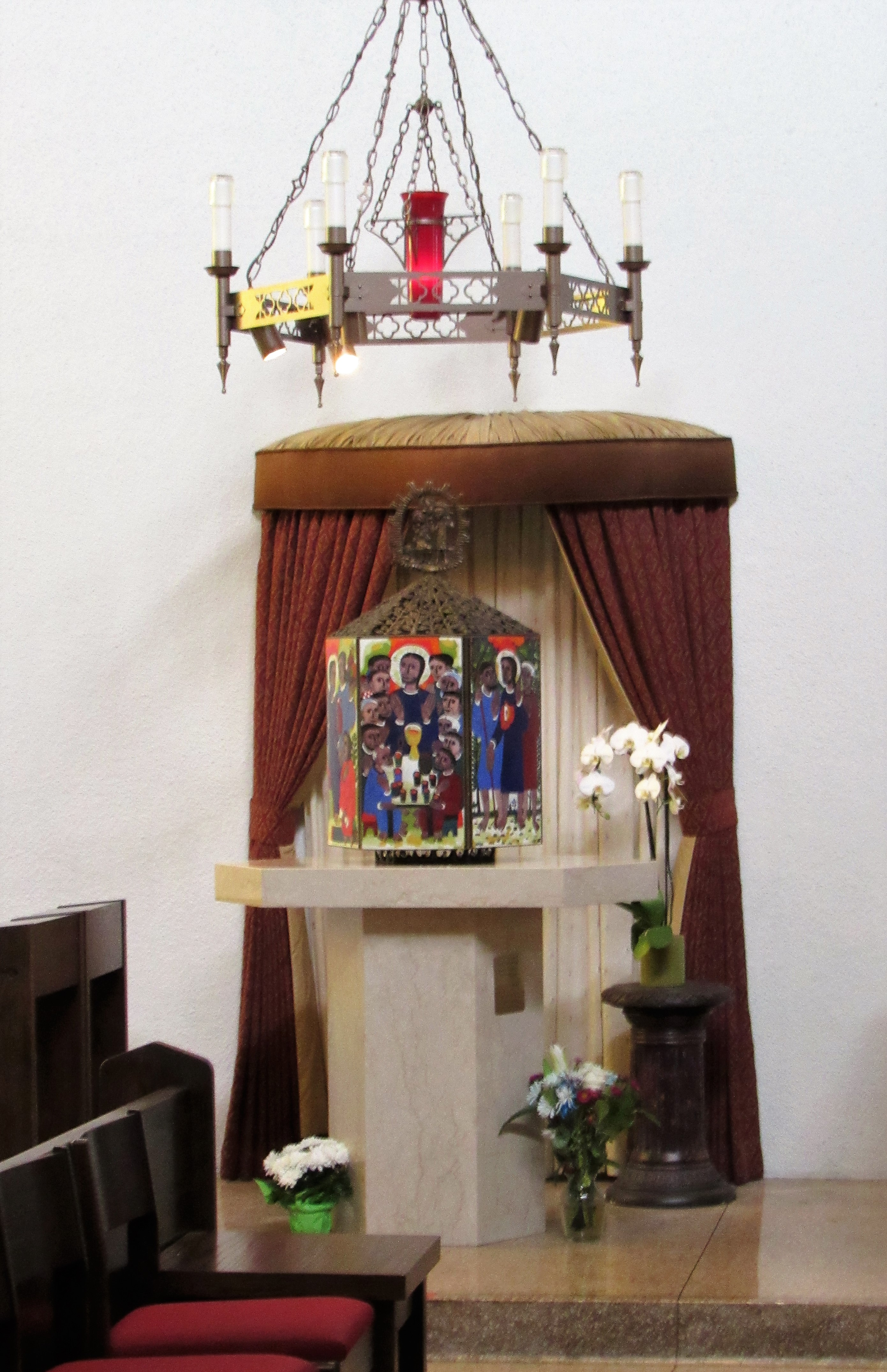
Weinert tabernacle

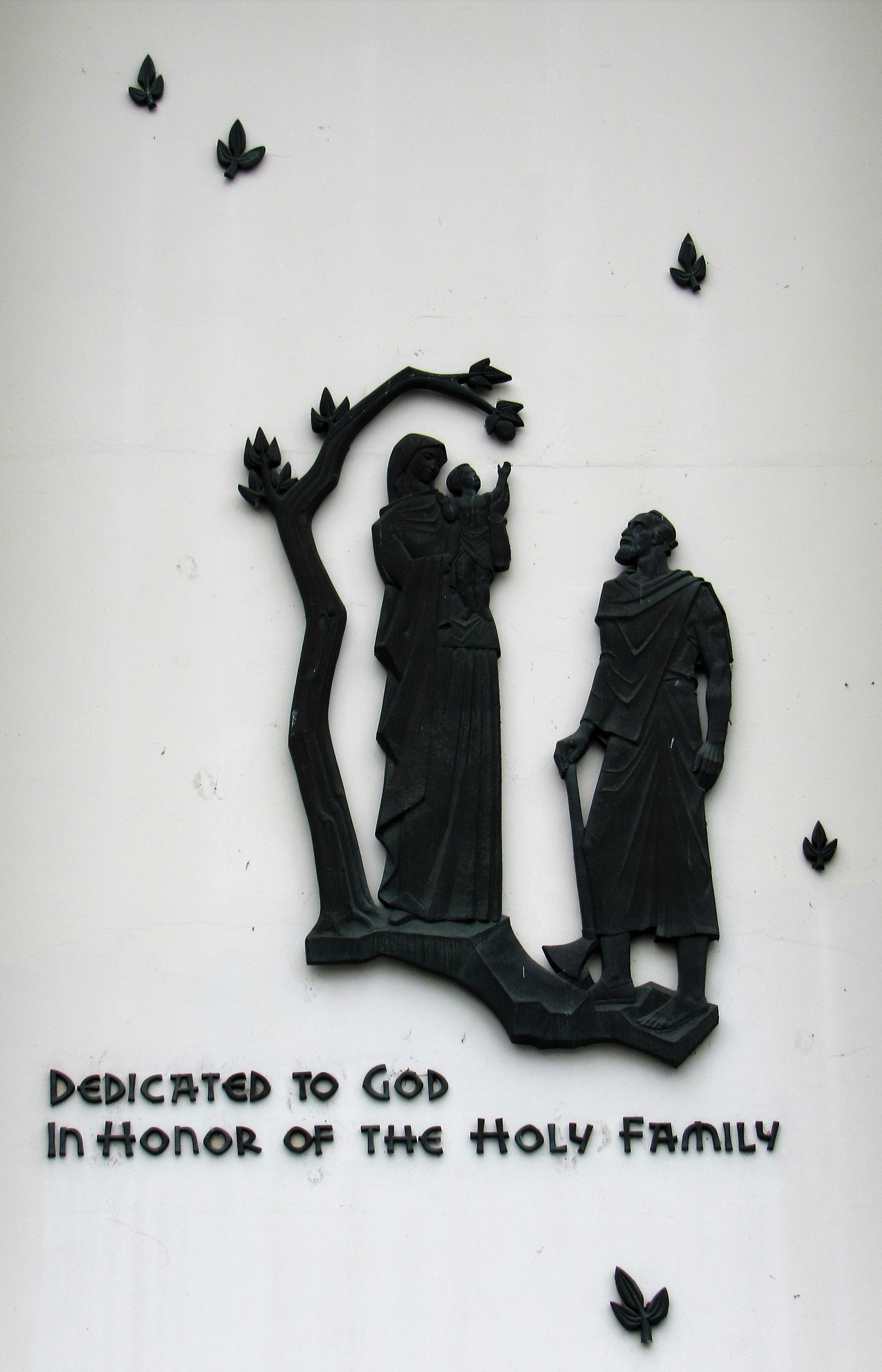
Facade decoration

== Events ==
Holy Family Parish holds a fiesta each September.

== See also ==
- List of Catholic cathedrals in the United States
- List of cathedrals in the United States
