= Thomas Robert Zinkula =

21st-century Roman Catholic Archbishop and Prelate

His Excellency, The Most Reverend Thomas Robert Zinkula DD, JD, JCL
- Metropolitan Archbishop of Dubuque
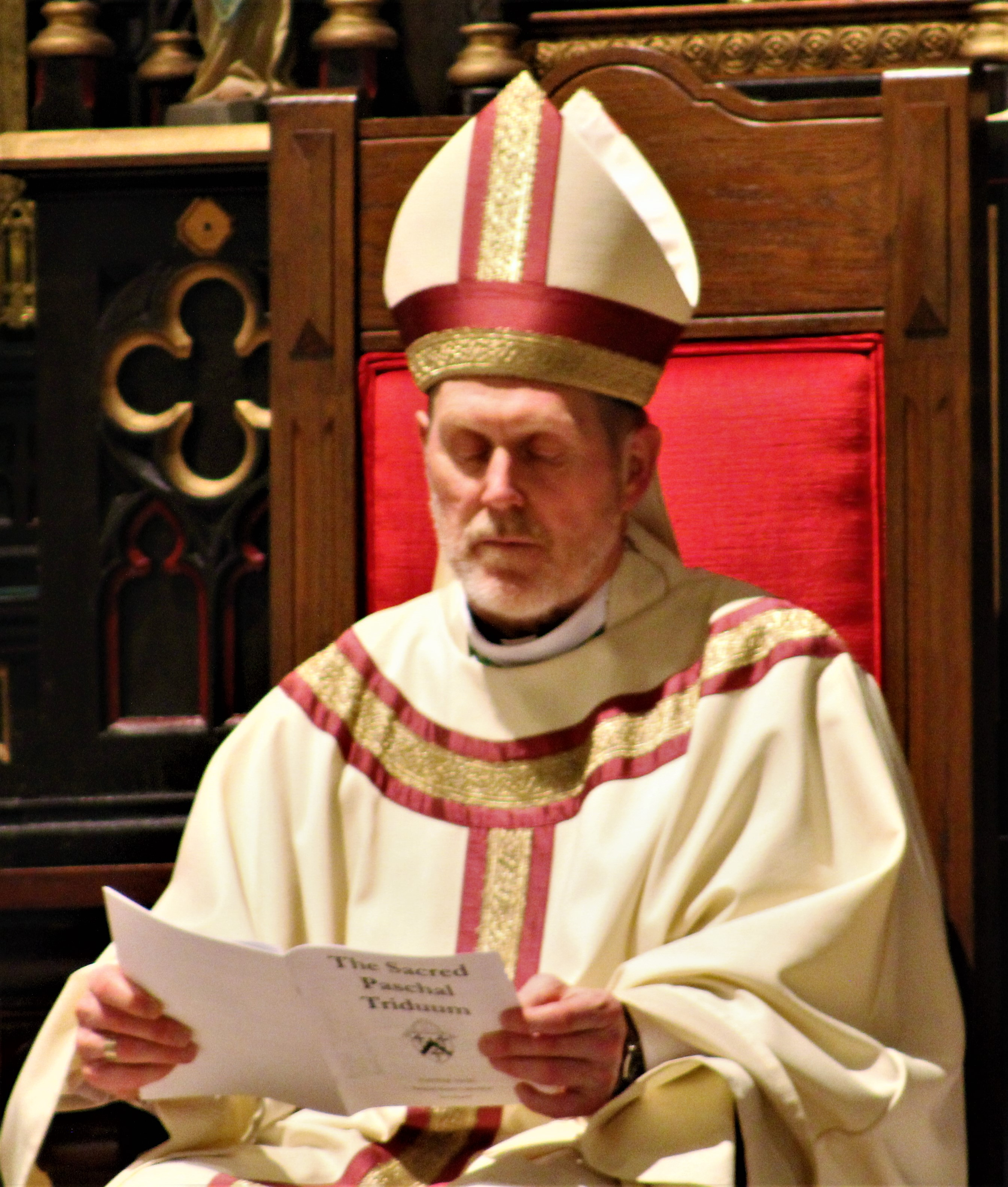
- Zinkula in 2022
- Church: Catholic
- Archdiocese: Dubuque
- Appointed: July 26, 2023
- Installed: October 18, 2023
- Predecessor: Michael Owen Jackels
- Previous post: Bishop of Davenport (2017-2023)

Orders
- Ordination: May 26, 1990 by Daniel Kucera
- Consecration: June 22, 2017 by Michael Owen Jackels, Martin John Amos, and Jerome Hanus

Personal details
- Born: April 19, 1957 (age 69) Mount Vernon, Iowa, US
- Education: Cornell College; University of Iowa School of Law; Theological College (Catholic University of America); Saint Paul University
- Motto: Fiat voluntas tua (Thy will be done)

Styles of Thomas Robert Zinkula
- Reference style: His Excellency; The Most Reverend
- Spoken style: Your Excellency
- Religious style: Archbishop

Ordination history of Thomas Robert Zinkula
History
Episcopal consecration
- Consecrated by: Michael Jackels
Episcopal succession
Bishops consecrated by Thomas Robert Zinkula as principal consecrator
- Dennis G. Walsh: September 27, 2024
- John Edward Keehner: May 1, 2025

Thomas Robert Zinkula (born April 19, 1957) is an American Catholic prelate who has served as Archbishop of Dubuque since 2023. He previously served as Bishop of Davenport from 2017 to 2023.

== Biography ==
=== Early life and education ===
Thomas Zinkula was born on April 19, 1957, in Mount Vernon, Iowa, to Robert and Mary (Volz) Zinkula. He grew up on a farm with eight siblings. In 1975, Zinkula graduated as the valedictorian from Mount Vernon High School. He received a bachelor's degree in mathematics, economics and business from Cornell College in Mount Vernon. Zinkula was inducted into the Athletic Hall of Fame at Cornell as a defensive lineman for the college football team.

After college, Zinkula worked for one year as an actuary for Life Investors in Cedar Rapids, Iowa. He then entered the University of Iowa College of Law in Iowa City, Iowa, earning a Juris Doctor in 1983. He practiced law for three years with the Simmons, Perrine, Albright & Ellwood law firm in Cedar Rapids, Iowa.

Zinkula studied for the priesthood at Theological College at the Catholic University of America in Washington, D.C., receiving a Master in Theology degree in 1990. He earned a licentiate in canon law from Saint Paul University in 1998.

=== Priesthood ===
Zinkula was ordained a priest for the Archdiocese of Dubuque by Archbishop Daniel Kucera on May 26, 1990, at St. Raphael's Cathedral in Dubuque.

After his 1990 ordination, the archdiocese assigned Zinkula as the assistant pastor of St. Columbkille's Parish in Dubuque. He was transferred in 1993 to become assistant pastor at St. Joseph the Worker Parish in Dubuque. In 1996, he returned to Saint Paul University, where he earned a Licentiate of Canon Law in 1998.

On his return to Iowa in 1998, the archdiocese assigned Zinkula as pastor of St. Joseph Parish in Rickardsville, Iowa and sacramental priest for St. Francis Parish in Balltown, Iowa and Saints Peter and Paul Parish in Sherrill, Iowa from 1998 to 2002. He served as a judge at the Archdiocesan Tribunal from 1998 to 2000 and as judicial vicar from 2000 to 2010. He was pastor of Holy Ghost Parish in Dubuque from 2005 to 2007. Holy Ghost was clustered with Sacred Heart and Holy Trinity parishes to form the Holy Spirit Pastorate, which he served as pastor from 2007 to 2011.

Zinkula served as the episcopal vicar for the Cedar Rapids Region of the archdiocese from 2012 to 2014, and as the rector of St. Pius X Seminary in Dubuque from 2014 to 2017. Zinkula was named a monsignor by Pope Benedict XVI in 2012.

=== Bishop of Davenport ===
Coat of arms as bishop of Davenport

On April 19, 2017, Pope Francis named Zinkula the ninth bishop of Davenport. When notified of his appointment by text message, Zinkula assumed it was a prank by a seminarian. He was ordained a bishop at St. John Vianney Church in Bettendorf, Iowa, by Archbishop Michael Jackels of Dubuque, with Bishop Martin Amos and Archbishop Jerome Hanus as co-consecrators.

In June 2019, Zinkula indicated that the diocese would comply with a request from the Iowa Attorney General for sexual abuse records on clergy in the diocese.

In 2023, Zinkula reduced the number of deaneries in the diocese from six to five. The new configuration took into consideration the location of parishes and parish clusters and how priests are assigned to them. The diocese was heavily involved in the synodal process in preparation for the Sixteenth Ordinary General Assembly of the Synod of Bishops in 2023 During the continental stage of the preparation process, Zinkula was one of eight bishops on the North American Synod Team.

In January 2021, Zinkula formed a committee to draft a policy regarding sexual and gender identity issues. They spent over two years studying the issue. On October 4, 2023, Zinkula promulgated Guidelines for Pastoral Accompaniment of Sexual and Gender Minorities.

=== Archbishop of Dubuque ===
On July 26, 2023, Pope Francis appointed Zinkula as the eleventh archbishop of Dubuque. He was installed on October 18, 2023, by Cardinal Christophe Pierre at the Church of the Nativity in Dubuque.

== See also ==
- Catholic Church hierarchy
- Catholic Church in the United States
- Historical list of the Catholic bishops of the United States
- List of Catholic bishops of the United States
- Lists of patriarchs, archbishops, and bishops

Catholic Church titles
Preceded by Martin John Amos	Bishop of Davenport; 2017-2023	Succeeded by Dennis G. Walsh
Preceded by Michael Owen Jackels	Archbishop of Dubuque; 2023-Present	Succeeded by Incumbent
