= Love Holy Trinity Blessed Mission =

United States Catholic organization

The Group's Logo.

Love Holy Trinity Blessed Mission (LHTBM) is an American organization based in Chicago, Illinois. It represents itself as a Roman Catholic mission. The group is active in Iowa, Illinois, and Wisconsin. The organization was founded in Chicago, and is currently led by Kyo McDonald and Father Len Kruzel, a former priest of the Archdiocese of Chicago. LHTBM began as a series of prayer meetings and Bible study groups in 1992. McDonald and Kruzel oversaw the expansion of the group into Iowa, Illinois, and Wisconsin.

The organization is currently seeking approval from the Vatican to become a formal religious order. The order is made up of lay Brothers and Sisters who live in a communal setting. LHTBM owns a convent and school in Chicago, a number of properties in Dubuque, Iowa, and a farm near Bellevue, Iowa that it plans to use as a retreat center. The Bellevue property was sold for $965,000 in May 2007 as reported in local news outlets.

== Controversy ==
LHTBM is the subject of much controversy. The organization itself claims a commitment to scripture and prayer, and that it has helped many to make their faith a more important and meaningful part of their lives. Some say the organization is a cult, expressing concerns over the group's interpretation of Catholic religious teachings and citing demands of obedience from members as well as detachment from relatives and the outside world.

Msgr. James Barta, Vicar General of the Dubuque Archdiocese, said that members seem to believe that McDonald was in direct communion with God. He said, "I asked them one time, who is your superior, who is your guide, your mentor in all of this? They said, Kyo McDonald. And I said well, who is her superior, who is her guide, her mentor? They said, the Holy Spirit. So, that's a big jump there".

The Dioceses of Madison, Rockford, and the Archdiocese of Dubuque have all issued formal statements warning local Catholics not to associate with the group. Dubuque Archbishop Jerome Hanus has stated that the group is not an approved Catholic group, that Catholics should avoid the group, and that the group is not to distribute literature on church property or use church facilities for meetings.

The notification by Dubuque Archbishop Jerome Hanus was partially in response to a situation where a young woman, who had planned to attend Loras College, suddenly moved to the group's convent in Chicago just before she was due to begin classes. She has specifically claimed in a letter that was provided to the Dubuque Telegraph Herald that she joined the group of her own free will. But members of her family as well as other people believe that may not be the case. Another letter penned by Fahey surfaced in March 2007. This letter was submitted to the Belvidere, Illinois city council seeking permission to relocate LHTBM headquarters to an old hospital in the city. The council unanimously rejected the request.

On Friday, September 23, 2005, Chicago Cardinal Archbishop Francis George also banned the group from meeting in Archdiocesan facilities. George indicated that Fr. Kruzel had been recalled and reassigned to a regular pastoral position.

While many Catholics support the decisions of the Bishops to issue formal warnings against the group, members of the LHTBM itself have expressed disappointment over the decision. Members of the group have compared their situation to those of other religious orders, who faced difficulties when first formed, as well as the early persecutions of Christians.

In December 2005, the group came under fire by city officials in Chicago over zoning issues. Their main Chicago facility was in a neighborhood designated as B1-1 Neighborhood Shopping District. The complex included a community center and a school. But the facility apparently included a church on the main floor - which the city indicated needed a special use permit, and two exterior signs that also needed special permits. The city also wanted the group to maintain parking spots for people visiting the church as well as employees of the community center. Officials indicated that the group was creating a public nuisance and asked for an injunction in court.
