= Dennis G. Walsh =

American Catholic prelate (born 1965)

His Excellency, The Most Reverend Dennis G. Walsh
- Bishop of Davenport
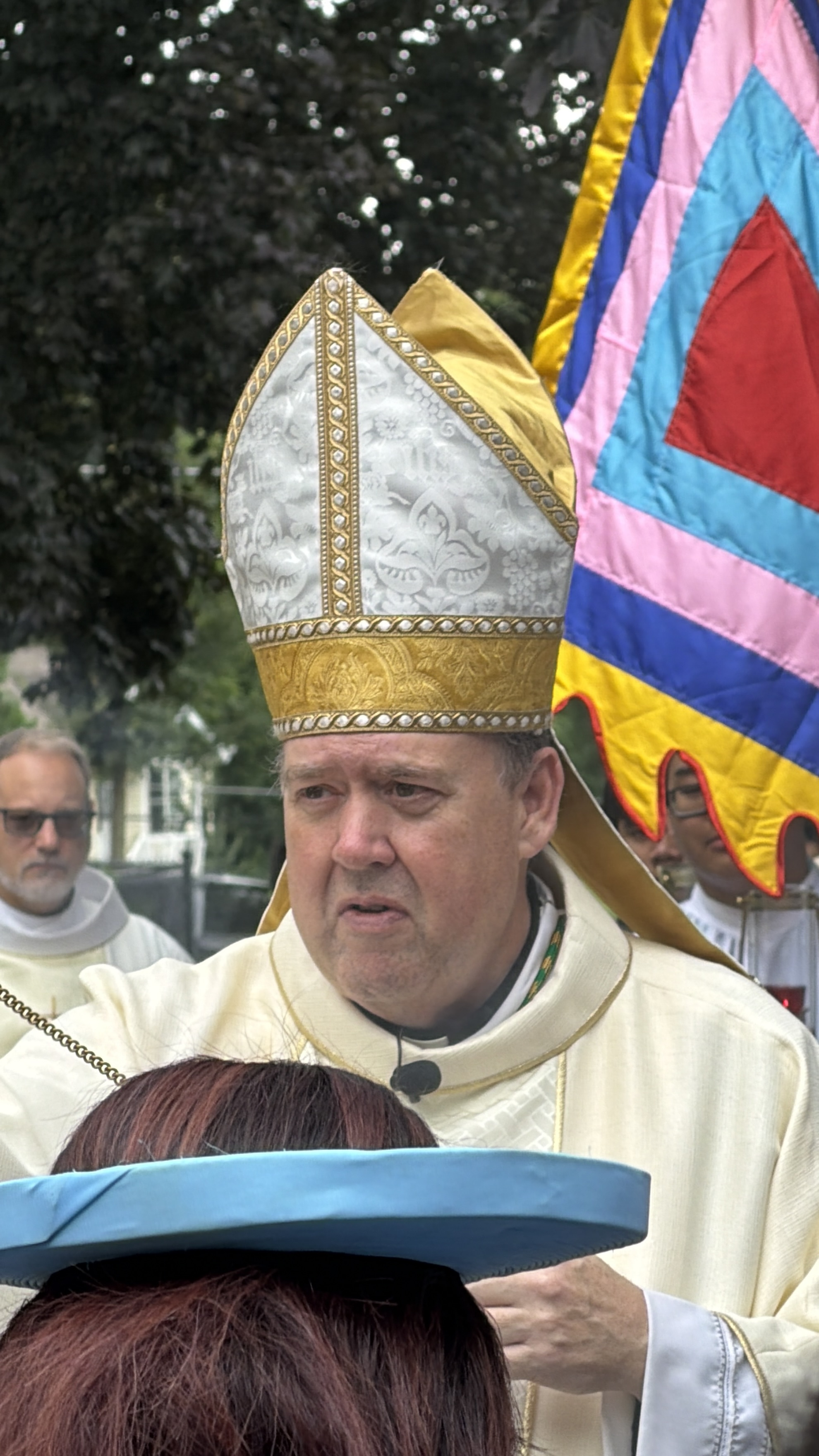
- Walsh in 2026 at a Vietnamese celebration
- Church: Catholic Church
- Diocese: Davenport
- Appointed: June 25, 2024
- Installed: September 27, 2024
- Predecessor: Thomas Robert Zinkula

Orders
- Ordination: May 27, 1992 by John Joseph Glynn
- Consecration: September 27, 2024 by Thomas Robert Zinkula, Martin John Amos, and Daniel Edward Thomas

Personal details
- Born: July 16, 1965 (age 61) Lima, Ohio, US
- Education: St. Alphonsus College; Washington Theological Union
- Motto: In manus tuas Domine (Latin for 'Into your hands Lord')
- Styles
- Reference style: His Excellency; The Most Reverend
- Spoken style: Your Excellency
- Religious style: Bishop

Dennis Gerard Walsh (born June 16, 1965) is an American Catholic prelate serving as the Bishop of Davenport since 2024. When he was ordained a priest, he was a member of the Congregation of the Most Holy Redeemer and later became a priest in the Diocese of Toledo, Ohio.

== Biography ==
=== Early life and education ===
Walsh was born on July 16, 1965, in Lima, Ohio, to Daniel and Marilyn Walsh. He was educated at the Elida Local School District where he graduated in 1983. He received a Bachelor of Arts degree in philosophy from St. Alphonsus College in Suffield, Connecticut. He professed temporary religious vows as a Redemptorist in 1986 and final vows in 1991. He studied for the priesthood at Washington Theological Union in Washington, D.C. where he received a Master of Divinity degree in 1992.

=== Priesthood ===
Walsh was ordained a priest for the Redemptorists on May 27, 1992, in the Crypt Church of the Basilica of the National Shrine of the Immaculate Conception in Washington, D.C., by Bishop John Joseph Glynn.

After his ordination, the Redemptorists sent Walsh to Iglesia de San Antonio de Padua in Guayama, Puerto Rico, where he studied Spanish. After returning to Maryland, they assigned him as parochial vicar at St. Michael Parish in Baltimore. Walsh was transferred in 1994 to Immaculate Conception Parish in the South Bronx, New York City, then in 1998 to St. Mary Parish in Sandusky, Ohio. In 2000, he was incardinated, or transferred, from the Redemptorists to the Diocese of Toledo, Ohio.

In 2002, the diocese assigned Walsh as pastor of St. John the Evangelist Parish in Defiance, Ohio. He then served as the pastor of St. Patrick of Heatherdowns Parish in Toledo, Ohio. In 2015, he was appointed pastor of St. John the Evangelist Parish in Delphos, Ohio and St. John the Baptist Parish in Landeck, Ohio. St. Patrick Parish in Spencerville, Ohio and head of school for St. John the Evangelist Elementary and High School were added to his responsibilities in 2016. Walsh has also served on various boards and commissions of the diocese.

== Bishop of Davenport ==
On June 25, 2024, Pope Francis named Walsh as the tenth bishop of Davenport. He was ordained and installed as bishop on September 27, 2024 in Sacred Heart Cathedral in Davenport, Iowa. Archbishop Thomas Zinkula of Dubuque was the ordaining bishop with Bishop Emeritus Martin Amos of Davenport and Bishop Daniel Thomas of Toledo as co-consecrators.

== See also ==
- Catholic Church hierarchy
- Catholic Church in the United States
- Historical list of the Catholic bishops of the United States
- List of Catholic bishops of the United States
- Lists of patriarchs, archbishops, and bishops

Catholic Church titles
Preceded by Thomas Robert Zinkula	Bishop of Davenport; 2024–Present	Succeeded by Incumbent
