= St. Mary's Catholic Church (Nichols, Iowa) =

Historic church building in Iowa, United States

- St. Mary’s Roman Catholic Church
- U.S. National Register of Historic Places
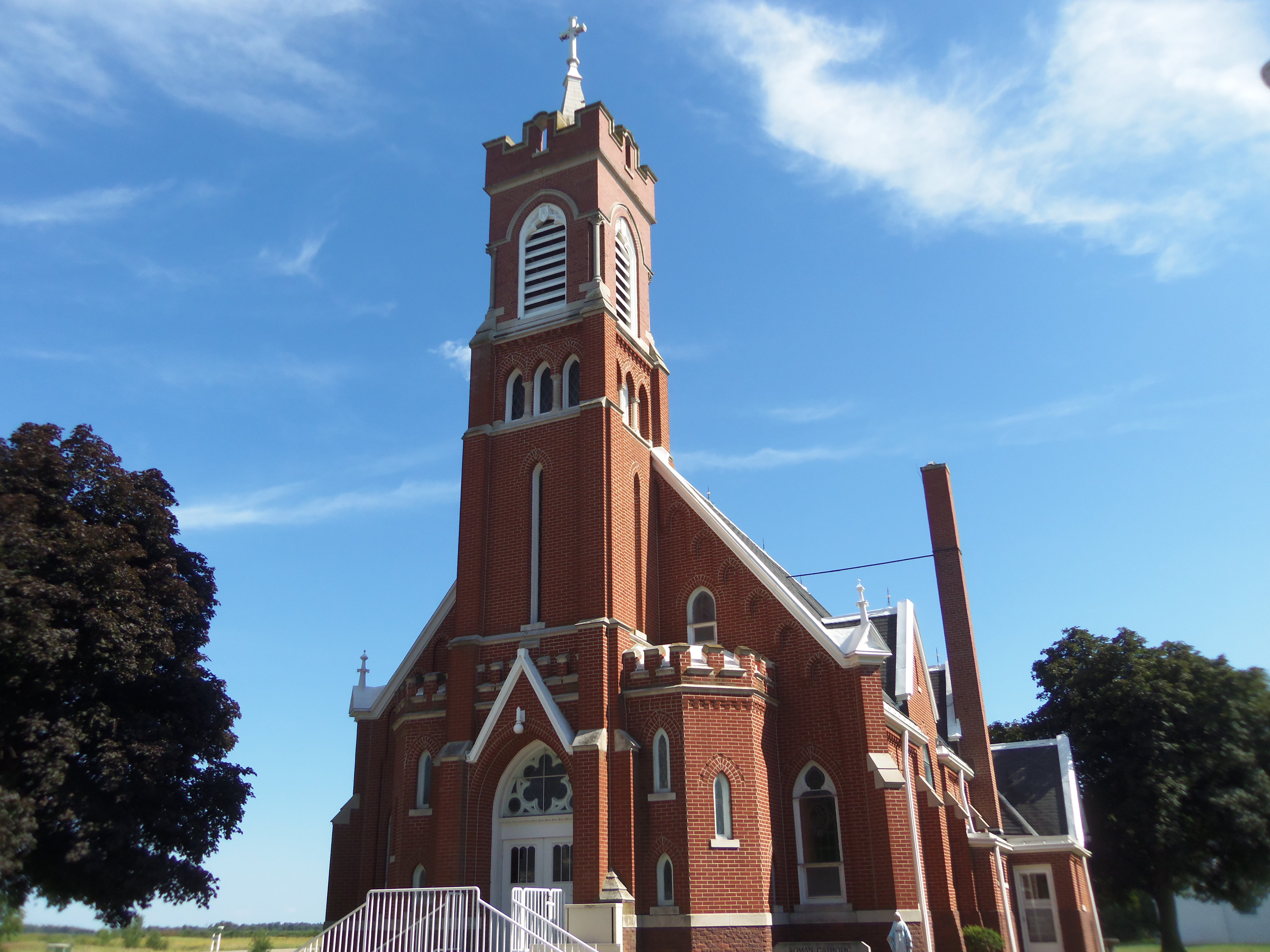

- Location within Iowa Location within the United States
- Location: 314 Grand Ave. Nichols, Iowa
- Coordinates: 41°28′41.3″N 91°18′32″W
- Area: less than one acre
- Built: 1920
- Architectural style: Gothic Revival
- NRHP reference No.: 100008198
- Added to NRHP: September 19, 2022

St. Mary's Catholic Church is a parish church of the Diocese of Davenport. The church is located in Nichols, Iowa, United States. The parish was founded in 1874 in the Diocese of Dubuque in what was then called Nichols Station. At the same time, a church building was constructed. A resident pastor was assigned to the parish in 1877. St. Mary's was incorporated into the Diocese of Davenport when it was founded in 1881. The original church building was destroyed in a fire. The present brick, Gothic Revival structure was completed in 1920. It was listed on the National Register of Historic Places in 2022.
