= Diocese of Davenport =

Latin Catholic jurisdiction in the US

Diocese of Davenport Diœcesis Davenportensis
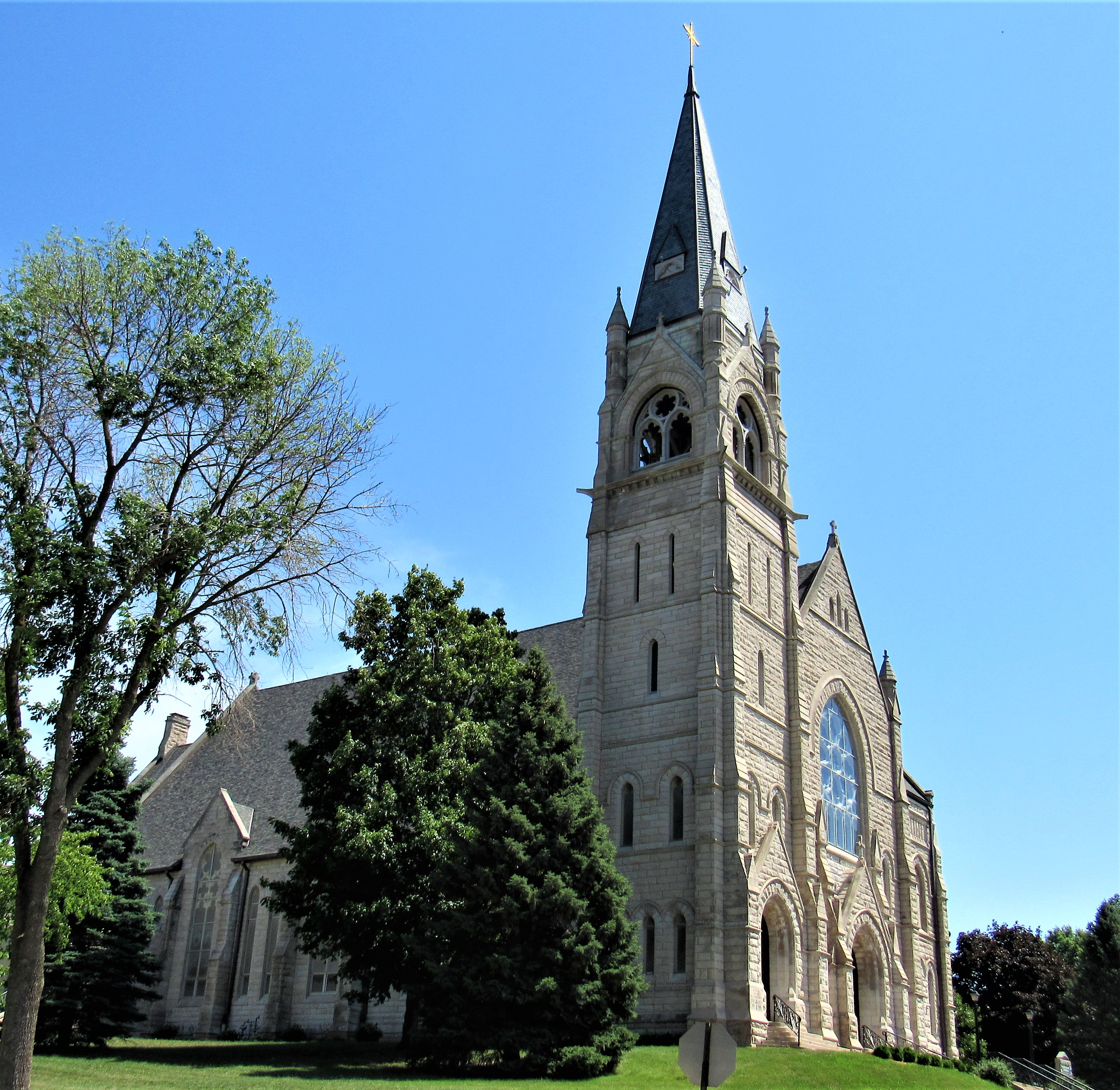
- Sacred Heart Cathedral

- Coat of arms

Location
- Country: United States
- Territory: 22 Counties in the Southeast quadrant of Iowa
- Ecclesiastical province: Dubuque
- Coordinates: 41°32′48.34″N 90°34′57.93″W

Statistics
- Area: 11,438 sq mi (29,620 km^{2})
- Population: Total; Catholics: (as of 2013); 784,000; 104,300 (13.3%)
- Parishes: 78

Information
- Denomination: Catholic
- Sui iuris church: Latin Church
- Rite: Roman Rite
- Established: May 8, 1881 (145 years ago)
- Cathedral: Sacred Heart Cathedral

Current leadership
- Pope: Leo XIV
- Bishop: Dennis Gerard Walsh
- Metropolitan Archbishop: Thomas Zinkula
- Vicar General: Very Rev. Jason Crossen
- Bishops emeritus: Martin John Amos

Map
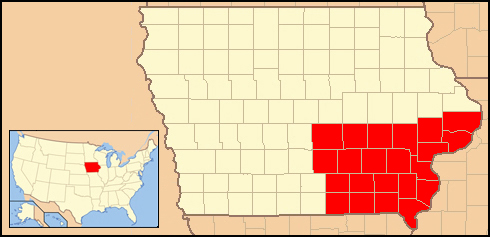

Website
- davenportdiocese.org

The Diocese of Davenport (Latin: Diœcesis Davenportensis) is a diocese of the Catholic Church for the southeastern quarter of the state of Iowa in the United States. The bishop is Dennis Gerard Walsh. The see city for the diocese is Davenport, where Sacred Heart Cathedral is located.

== Territory ==
The Diocese of Davenport covers the territory to the immediate west of the Mississippi River and borders on the Missouri state line on the south. It includes the following counties: Appanoose, Cedar, Clinton, Davis, Des Moines, Henry, Iowa, Jasper, Jefferson, Johnson, Keokuk, Lee, Louisa, Mahaska, Marion, Monroe, Muscatine, Poweshiek, Scott, Van Buren, Wapello and Washington

== History ==
=== 1800 to 1850 ===
From the time of the Louisiana Purchase in 1803 down to 1827, present-day Iowa was part of the Diocese of New Orleans. With the establishment of the Diocese of St. Louis in 1826, Iowa was transferred from New Orleans. The Society of Jesus began sending missionaries around the Mississippi Valley in the early 1830s. In 1837, the Vatican erected the Diocese of Dubuque, covering Iowa and adjoining territories.

St. Anthony's Parish in Davenport was established around 1837 by the Dominican missionary Samuel Mazzuchelli. Its church was built in 1838 on land donated by French-Potawatomi entrepreneur Antoine Le Claire. The building served as a church, city hall, courthouse, schoolhouse, public forum, and gathering place for the citizens of Davenport.

In 1839, the French missionary Jean-Antoine-Marie Pelamourgues was named the first resident pastor of St. Anthony's. His duties included attending the communities of Muscatine, Burlington, Iowa City, Columbus Junction, DeWitt, Lyons, and Stephenson, Illinois, across the Mississippi River from Davenport. Pelamourgues studied to improve his English; when German immigrants began to arrive, he took up that language as well.

The first Catholic church in Burlington was St. Paul, built by Mazzuchell in 1840. In 1841, he constructed a small log church for St. Mary of the Assumption, the first parish in Iowa City.

=== 1850 to 1900 ===
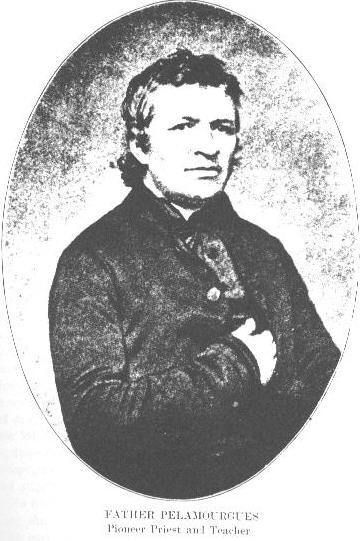
J.A.M. Pelamourges

In 1856, Pelamourgues helped establish the parish of St. Kunigunda in Davenport, where mass was celebrated in Latin and German. When the German pastor at St. Kunigunda refused to celebrate mass in English for Irish immigrants, Pelamourgues erected St. Mary's Parish for them two blocks away.

The Sisters of Charity of the Blessed Virgin Mary in 1859 opened the Immaculated Conception Academy, the first Catholic school for girls in Davenport.When John Hennessy was appointed bishop of Dubuque in 1866, he requested that the Vatican divide Iowa into two dioceses, with the new diocese covering the lower half of the state. The Vatican did not take any actions at that time.

The Sisters of Mercy arrived in Davenport in 1869 with plans to open a school. However, after seeing the conditions in the Scott County Poor Farm, they decided to open a hospital instead. Mercy Hospital opened in Davenport later that year. Today it is MercyOne Genesis Davenport Medical Center.In 1873, the sisters opened a second Mercy Hospital in Iowa City. Today it is University of Iowa Health Care Medical Center Downtown.

By the late 1870s, the Vatican was ready to establish a second diocese in Iowa. Hennessy suggested locating it in Des Moines, but the Vatican chose Davenport instead.

=== 1881 to 1900 ===
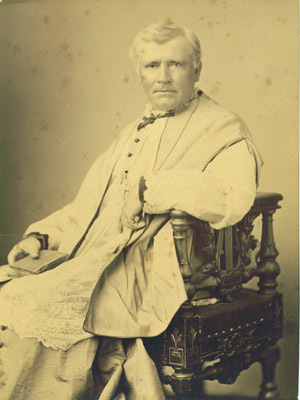
Bishop McMullen (pre-1884)

On May 8, 1881, Pope Leo XIII erected the Diocese of Davenport. He selected John McMullen, vicar general of the Archdiocese of Chicago, to serve as the first bishop of the new diocese. As bishop, McMullen chose St. Margaret's Church in Davenport as the new cathedral. Arriving in Davenport, he was greeted by a large crowd of Catholics and Protestants.

McMullen quickly embarked on a tour of the parishes in his diocese. He traveled the diocese by stagecoach, buggy, lumber wagon, hand car and train. While on visitation, he administered confirmations and other sacraments in many locations.McMullen called the diocese's first synod in 1882 to set its procedures and regulations. By December 1882, McMullen had confirmed over 13,000 people. After almost two years as bishop, McMullen died in 1883.

Henry Cosgrove, the diocesan administrator and cathedral rector, was appointed by Leo XIII as the second bishop of Davenport in 1884. Deciding that St. Margaret's was no longer adequate as a cathedral, Cosgrove constructed Sacred Heart Cathedral in 1891 to replace it. He established Sacred Heart Asylum in Davenport in 1895, operated by the Sisters Servants of the Sacred Heart. The Congregation of the Humility of Mary took over the asylum in 1896. Sacred Heart Asylum later became St. Vincent's Home for orphans

=== 1900 to 1930 ===
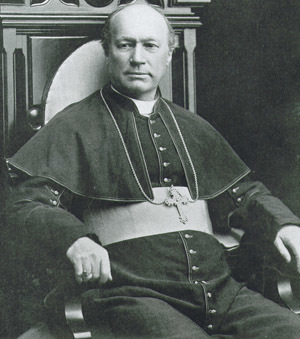
Bishop Cosgrove (1906)

Cosgrove supported the national Temperance Movement and called for a moral crusade in the diocese, especially in Davenport. In 1903, he was quoted in the national media as labeling Davenport "the wicked city of its size in America". This was due to the Bucktown District, an area of speakeasies and brothels close to the cathedral.

In 1904, at Cosgrove's request, Pope Pius X named James J. Davis, vicar general and cathedral rector, as coadjutor bishop of the diocese to assist with its administration. Cosgrove presided over the diocese's second synod the same year. When Cosgrove died in 1906, Davis became bishop of Davenport. At this time, the Vatican started planning for a new diocese in Des Moines. Rather than splitting the Diocese of Davenport into two small dioceses, Davis proposed that Vatican redraw all the diocese boundaries in Iowa. The Archdiocese of Dubuque had 109,000 Catholics and the Diocese of Sioux City had 50,000 Catholics. He opposed the Vatican leaving their boundaries alone while splitting the Diocese of Davenport. Under the existing plan, Davenport would have 35,000 Catholics and Des Moines 25,000 Catholics.

In 1911, Pius X rejected Davis' request and erected the new Diocese of Des Moines from the Diocese of Davenport. However, Pius X did sever Clinton County from the archdiocese and gave it to the Diocese of Davenport. This change gave the diocese 50,000 Catholics out of a total population of 589,000.

As Davis' health declined he requested an auxiliary bishop to assist him. Edward Howard of the Dubuque archdiocese was appointed by Pope Pius XI on December 13, 1923. He was appointed Archbishop of Oregon City eight months prior to Davis' death. After Davis died in 1926, Pope Pius XI named Henry Rohlman as the fourth bishop of Davenport. In 1928, Rohlman commissioned a study to assess the social problems in the diocese. The result of this study was the establishment of Catholic Charities in 1929. Its immediate focus was the welfare of the children at St. Vincent's Home in Davenport.

=== 1930 to 1966 ===
The diocese celebrated its Golden Jubilee in 1931. The next year, Rohlman convoked the diocese's third synod to bring the diocese's regulations in line with the 1917 Code of Canon Law. The synod also set the salary for pastors at $1,000 per year, plus household expenses, and salaries for associate pastors and chaplains at $500. Catholic Charities set up their offices in the Kahl Building. They were joined in 1932 with the chancery and the newly established superintendent of schools. All of these offices and the bishop's office moved into a property on Church Square behind St. Anthony's Church downtown. It was renamed the Cosgrove Building after Cosgrove. The Catholic Messenger, an independent Catholic newspaper published in Davenport, was experiencing financial problems during the Great Depression of the 1930s; the diocese purchased it in 1937 to use as the diocesan newspaper.

Pope Pius XII named Rohlman as coadjutor archbishop of Dubuque in 1944 ; the pope replaced him in Davenport with Bishop Ralph Hayes, rector of the Pontifical North American College in Rome. Catholic school enrollment reached their highest enrollments during Hayes’ episcopate. Elementary school enrollment reached its highest mark in 1960 with 12,074 students and high schools in 1965 with 4,129 students. The National Catholic Welfare Council held a four-day conference in Davenport in 1949, focusing on the themes of industry, education, and rural life. Hayes established the Papal Volunteers of Latin America in the diocese in 1961 in response to a plea from Pope John XXIII. The diocese sent missionaries to Cuernavaca, Mexico and Ponce, Puerto Rico.

=== 1966 to 1993 ===
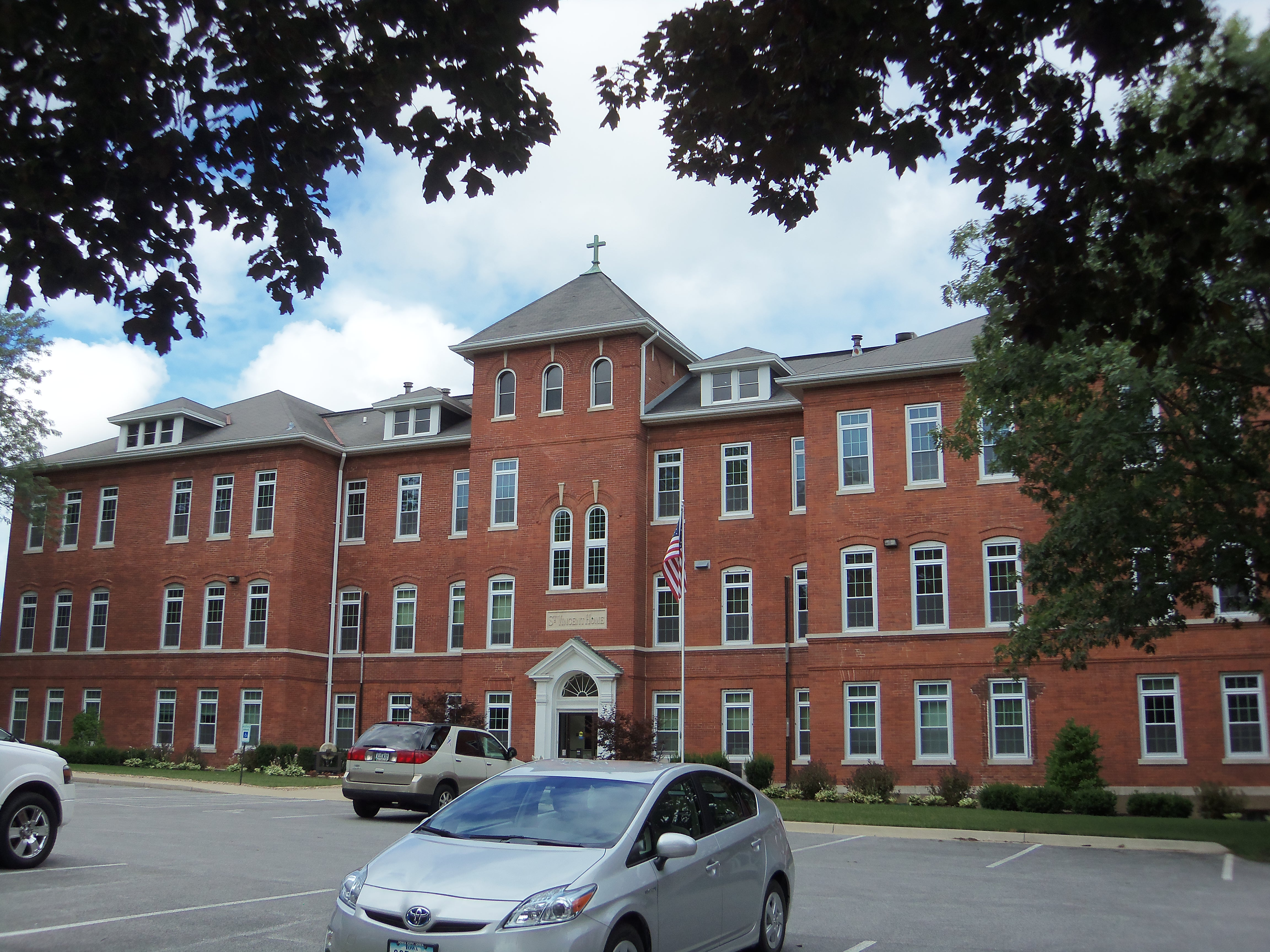
St. Vincent Center – Davenport (2013)

Hayes retired in 1966 after 22 years as bishop of Davenport. To replace him, Pope Paul VI named Auxiliary Bishop Gerald O'Keefe of the Archdiocese of St. Paul. O'Keefe established a sister's council for the members of women's religious orders in 1967 and a lay council in 1970. He created the first diocesan pastoral council and created a diocesan board of education. Procedures for due process were written in the late 1960s. In 1978, O'Keefe established the permanent diaconate in the diocese. The first class of deacons was ordained in 1980. A deacons council was also organized.

O’Keefe joined with Bishops Arthur O'Neil of Rockford and John Franz of Peoria to create an office that assisted migrant workers with job and education services. In 1972, the Social Action department established an Immigration Office. The diocese sent priests to Mexico to learn Spanish and to immerse themselves in its culture. Three Spanish-speaking deacons were ordained in 1981.

The economic recession of the 1980s impacted the diocesan population and resources. In 1991, O'Keefe announced a plan for clustering and closing smaller parishes, reflecting both the reduced number of priests and the lower diocese population. The diocese also witnessed a decline in enrollment in Catholic schools, leading to the merger or closing of schools. In 1970, there were ten hospitals in the diocese; by the time O'Keefe retired in 1993, they were reduced to three.

=== 1993 to 2010 ===
To replace O'Keefe, Pope John Paul II named Auxiliary Bishop William Franklin of Dubuque as the next bishop of Davenport in 1993. Franklin established an Office of Pastoral Services that combined the ministries of liturgy, education, and social action. He replaced the pastoral council with a pastoral council convocation.

The Redemptorists, who had served the diocese for 89 years, left in 1997 due to their declining numbers. That same year, the Sisters of St. Francis in Clinton built the Canticle, a new motherhouse in Clinton.

In 2001, John Paul II bestowed papal honors on 26 people of the diocese. The pope named four priests as chaplains to his holiness, eight laymen as knights of St. Gregory the Great, and three women as dames of the Order of St. Gregory the Great Eleven men and women received the cross oro ecclesia et pontifice. The three female recipients were the first in the history of the diocese.Franklin in 2004 assembled a task force to examine the viability of parishes. He retired as bishop of Davenport in 2006.

In 2006, Pope Benedict XVI appointed Auxiliary Bishop Martin Amos of the Diocese of Cleveland as the eighth bishop of Davenport. Two days before Amos assumed office, the diocese filed for Chapter 11 Bankruptcy protection. Bankruptcy forced the diocese to sell off property, including the bishop's residence, to pay for a financial settlement to sexual abuse victims. Amos had previously requested a small fixer-upper house to live in, believing the bishop's residence too big for him.

The diocese also sold the chancery building, the St. Vincent Center, and its surrounding property to St. Ambrose University in May 2009. At the same time, the diocese initiated a $22 million capital campaign to replenish diocesan finances and fund other projects. In March 2010, the diocese repurchased St. Vincent Center and 5 acres (2.0 ha) of land from St. Ambrose.

=== 2010 to present ===
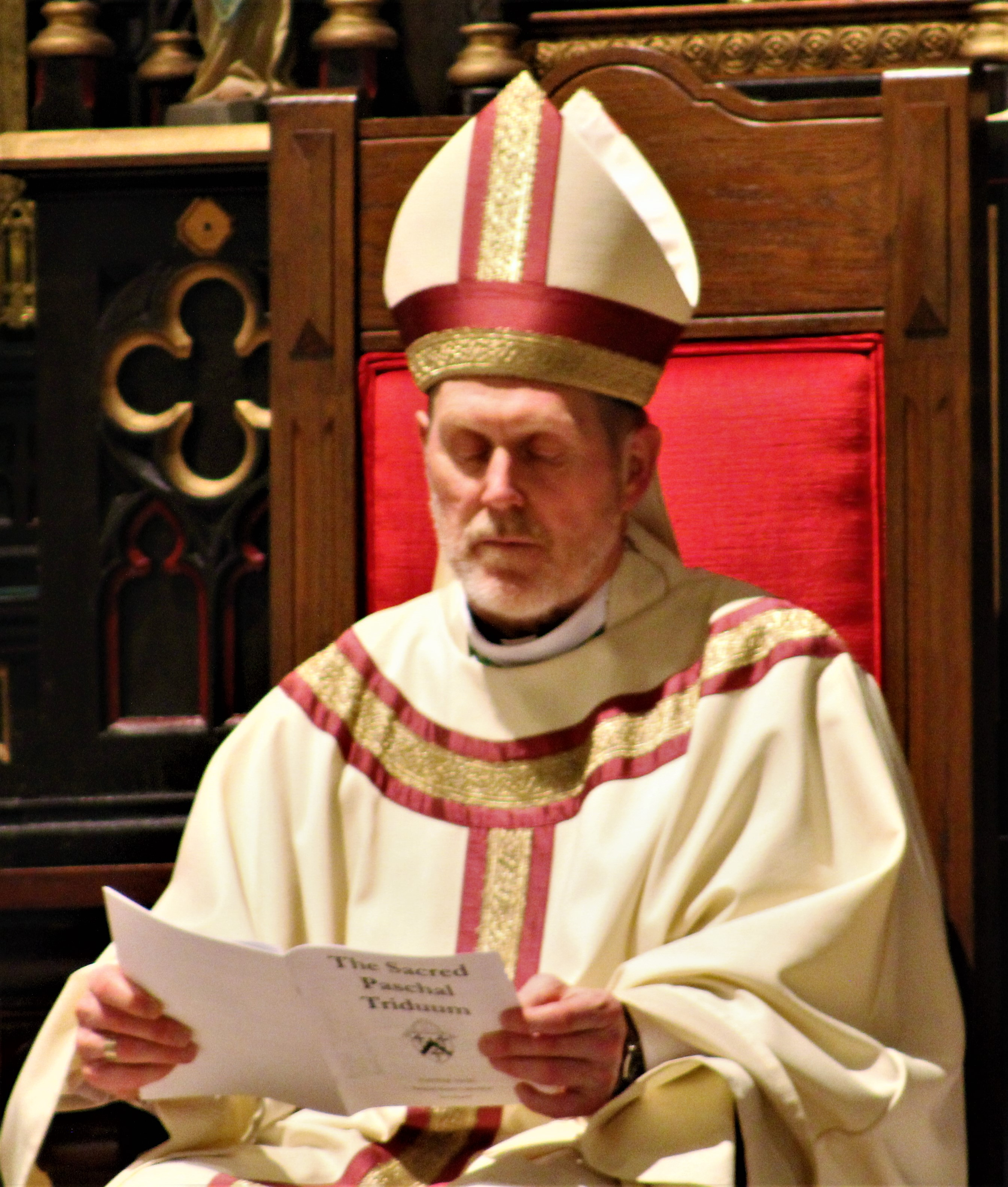
Bishop Zinkula (2022)

In July 2010, the diocese re-established Catholic Charities. The organization was initially introduced into the diocese in 1929 by Rohlman, but it had been discontinued in 1968. Amos retired as bishop of Davenport in 2017.

Thomas Zinkula from Dubuque was appointed bishop of Davenport by Pope Francis in 2017. Zinkula reduced the number of deaneries in the diocese from six to five in May 2023. In July 2023, Zinkula was named archbishop of Dubuque. Dennis G. Walsh was named bishop of Davenport by Francis in June 2024.

== Sex abuse cases ==
In 2002, Bishop Franklin received allegations of sexual abuse of minors in the 1970s by the priest William Wiebler. After Wiebler confessed the abuse to Franklin, the bishop ordered him to enter the Vianney Renewal Center, a treatment facility for priests in Dittmer, Missouri. However, Wiebler checked himself out of the facility and never returned to the diocese. He was laicized in 2006.In 2004, the diocese settled the claims of 37 sexual abuse victims for $9 million; Wiebler was named as an abuser in 12 of these lawsuits.

The diocese in October 2006 filed for Chapter 11 protection. By November 2007, the bankruptcy court had allocated $37 million in legal settlements to 156 victims. That same month, Bishop Amos announced that the board of trustees of St. Ambrose University had decided to remove O'Keefe's name from the school library as a result of his covering up of sexual abuse by priests in the diocese.

In 2014, documents revealed that James Janssen, who sexually abused boys and was laicized in 2004, stated in court during lawsuits that "I'm very sick." Janssen died in 2015.

== Higher education ==
=== Current institutions ===
==== St. Ambrose University ====
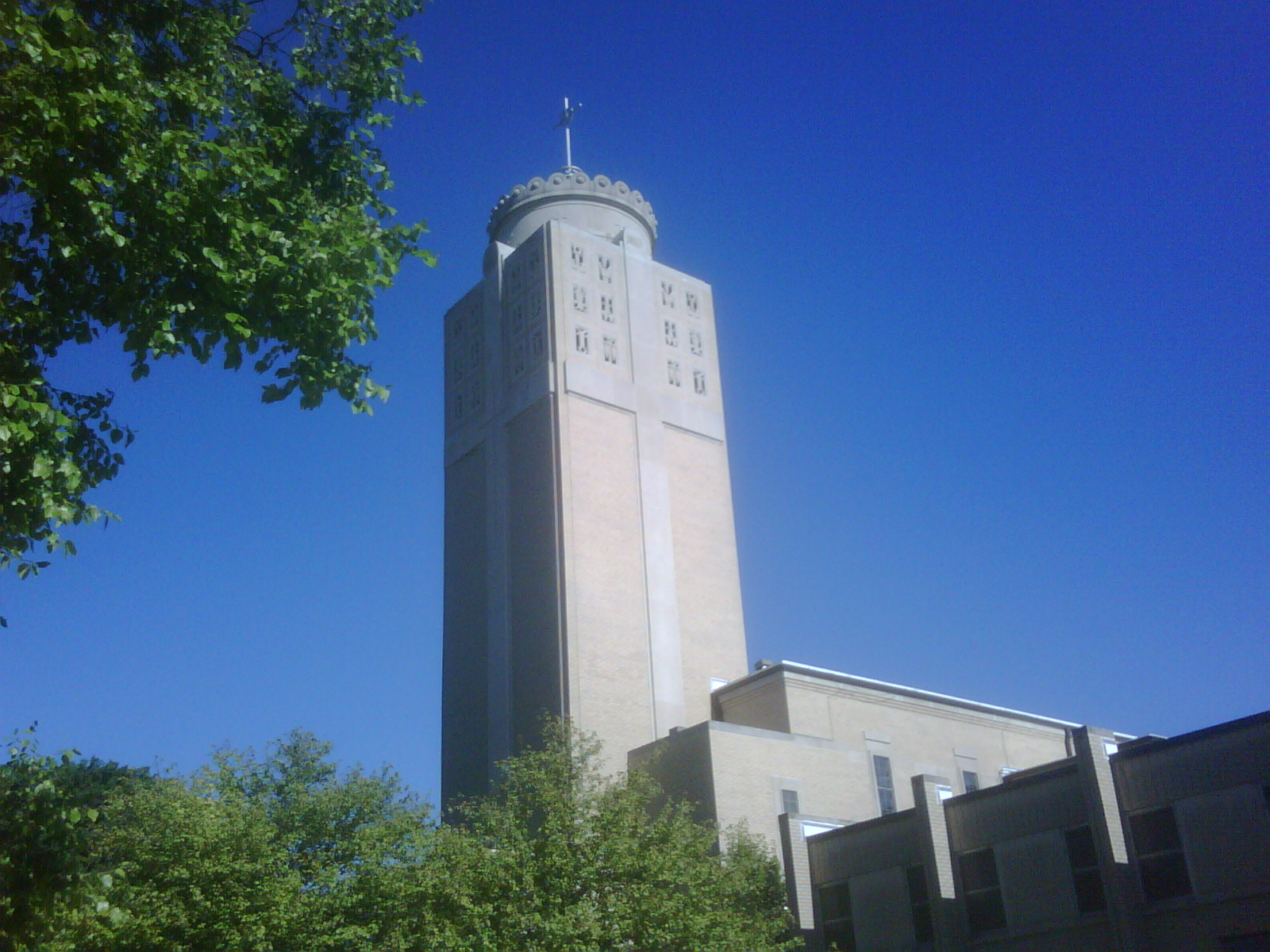
Christ the King Chapel at St. Ambrose University – Davenport (2010)

Saint Ambrose in Davenport was founded in 1882 by Bishop McMullen. Located in the school building of St. Margaret's Cathedral, it was then a seminary and commerce school for young men. St. Ambrose moved to its current location in 1885 and became St. Ambrose College in 1908. In 1987, St. Ambrose College became St. Ambrose University.

==== Campus ministry, University of Iowa ====
Since 1947, the diocese has supported the Newman Catholic Student Center at the University of Iowa in Iowa City.

=== Defunct institutions ===
==== Visitation Academy/Ottumwa Heights College ====
The Congregation of the Humility of Mary founded Visitation Academy in 1864 at their mother house in Ottumwa. The academy underwent several name changes until 1930, when it became Ottumwa Heights College. Ottumwa Heights merged with Indian Hills Community College (IHCC) in 1979 and closed in 1980. IHCC now occupies the Ottumwa Heights campus.

==== Marycrest College/Marycrest International University ====
Mount Saint Clare College – Clinton (1920)

The Congregation of the Humility of Mary founded Marycrest College in Davenport in 1939 as the woman's division of St. Ambrose. It became a separate college in the 1950s and became coeducational in 1969. In 1990, Marycrest was renamed Teikyo Marycrest University and in 1996 as Marycrest International University. Marycrest closed in 2002.

==== Mount St. Claire College/Franciscan University ====
The Sisters of St. Francis of Assisi established Mount St. Claire College for women in 1918 in Clinton. The college began offering online graduate courses in 2002 and changed its name to Franciscan University. In 2004, the school modified its name to Franciscan University of the Prairies. In 2005, the Sisters sold the school to Bridgepoint Education, Inc. which closed it in 2016.

== Coat of arms ==
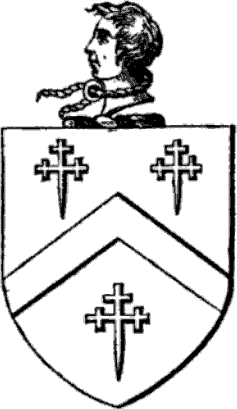
Davenport family

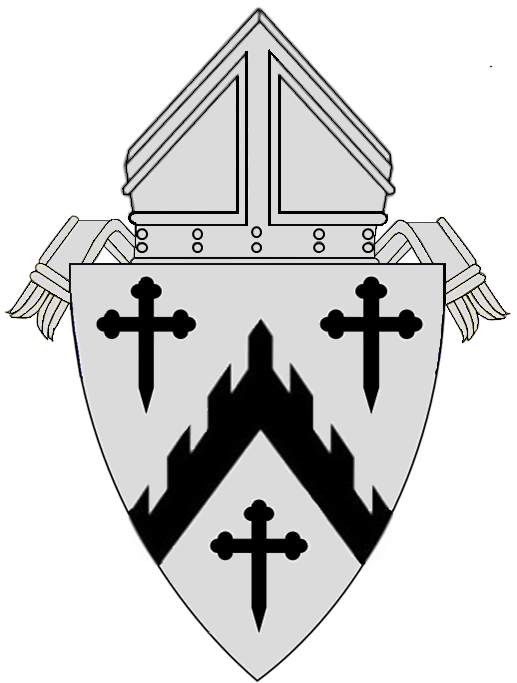
Diocese of Davenport

The coat of arms for the Diocese of Davenport was designed after the arms used by members of a Davenport family in England. The see city of the diocese is named for Colonel George Davenport, a native of Lincolnshire. The family's arms are described as, "Argent (white or silver), a chevron sable (black) between three cross crosslets fitchée of the second." The diocesan shield maintains the same color scheme. The black chevron is replaced with a black crenellated tower that alludes to Colonel Davenport's connection with the military and Fort Armstrong, which was located on an island in the Mississippi River across from the city of Davenport. It also recalls that the city was the state's first military headquarters during the American Civil War.

Another change from the family arms is the ends of the crosslets are rounded, or bottony. They reflect the shamrock of Saint Patrick that alludes to the Holy Trinity. The crosses on the arms of the Archdiocese of Dubuque have rounded ends also.

== Bishops ==
Bishops of Davenport
From	Until	Name	Notes
1881	1883	John McMullen †	Appointed bishop June 14, 1881; consecrated July 25, 1881; installed July 30, 1881; died in office July 4, 1883
1884	1906	Henry Cosgrove †	Appointed bishop July 11, 1884; consecrated and installed September 14, 1884; died in office December 22, 1906
1906	1926	James Joseph Davis †	Appointed Titular Bishop of Milopotamus and Coadjutor Bishop October 7, 1904; consecrated November 30, 1904; succeeded December 22, 1906; died in office December 2, 1926
1927	1944	Henry Patrick Rohlman †	Appointed bishop May 20, 1927; consecrated July 25, 1927; installed July 26, 1927; appointed Titular Archbishop of Macra and Coadjutor Archbishop of Dubuque September 8, 1944
1944	1966	Ralph Leo Hayes †	Previously Bishop of Helena and rector of the Pontifical North American College; appointed Bishop of Davenport November 16, 1944; installed January 11, 1945; appointed Titular bishop of Naraggara and Bishop Emeritus October 20, 1966; died July 5, 1970
1966	1993	Gerald Francis O'Keefe †	Previously Auxiliary Bishop of St. Paul; appointed Bishop of Davenport October 20, 1966; installed January 4, 1967; resigned November 12, 1993; died April 12, 2000
1993	2006	William Edwin Franklin †	Previously Auxiliary Bishop of Dubuque; appointed Bishop of Davenport November 12, 1993; installed January 20, 1994; resigned October 12, 2006; died April 10, 2026
2006	2017	Martin John Amos	Previously Auxiliary Bishop of Cleveland; appointed Bishop of Davenport October 12, 2006; installed November 20, 2006; resigned April 19, 2017
2017	2023	Thomas Robert Zinkula	Appointed bishop April 19, 2017; ordained and installed June 22, 2017; appointed Archbishop of Dubuque July 26, 2023
2024	present	Dennis Gerard Walsh	Appointed bishop June 25, 2024; ordained and installed September 27, 2024

Auxiliary Bishops of Davenport
From	Until	Name	Notes
1923	1926	Edward Daniel Howard †	Appointed Titular Bishop of Isaura December 23, 1923; consecrated April 8, 1924; appointed Archbishop of Oregon City April 30, 1926

Other priests of the diocese of Davenport who became bishops
From	Until	Name	Notes
1881	1884	Henry Cosgrove †	Appointed Bishop of Davenport July 11, 1884
1881	1906	James Joseph Davis †	Appointed Titular Bishop of Milopotamus and Coadjutor Bishop of Davenport October 7, 1904
1911	1936	William Lawrence Adrian †	Appointed Bishop of Nashville February 2, 1936
1939	1968	Maurice John Dingman †	Appointed Bishop of Des Moines April 2, 1968
1950	1983	Lawrence Donald Soens †	Appointed Bishop of Sioux City June 15, 1983
1994	2011	Robert Dwayne Gruss	Appointed Bishop of Rapid City May 26, 2011; Appointed Bishop of Saginaw May 24, 2019
2004	2025	Thomas Joseph Hennen	Appointed Bishop of Baker July 10, 2025

== Historic structures ==
The following structures are listed on the National Register of Historic Places (NRHP). Some of the structures are no longer part of the diocese but have historical significance to the parish.

Name	Image	Year	Location	Style	Architect	Notes
Ambrose Hall		1885	518 W. Locust Street, Davenport; 41°32′20″N 90°34′51″W	Second Empire	Victor Huot	Administrative building at St. Ambrose University
Antoine LeClaire House		1855	630 E. 7th Street, Davenport; 41°31′37″N 90°33′54″W	Italianate		Former residence of Bishops McMullen and Cosgrove. Antoine LeClaire helped establish St. Anthony's and the cathedral parishes in Davenport.
Church of All Saints		1879–1885	301 S. 9th Street, Keokuk; 40°23′50″N 91°23′25″W	Gothic Revival	William John Dillenburg	Church of All Saints since the three Keokuk parishes consolidated in 1982. Built as St. Peter's Church
Democrat Building		1923	411 Brady Street, Davenport; 41°31′26″N 90°34′26″W	Late 19th and Early 20th Century American Movements	Rudolph J.Clausen	The Catholic Messenger newspaper headquarters, housing its newsroom and printing press. Now a loft residence building
F.H. Miller House		1871	1527 Brady Street, Davenport; 41°32′9″N 90°34′26″W	Italianate	W.L. Carroll	Owned by Saint Ambrose University. Former residence of Bishops Davis and Rohlman and the novitiate for the Sisters of St. Francis of Assisi of Clinton
Henry Kahl House		1920	1101 W. 9th Street, Davenport; 41°31′41″N 90°35′18″W	Mission Revival; Spanish Revival	Arthur Ebeling	Part of the former Kahl Home for the Aged and Infirm, operated by the Carmelite Sisters
Marycrest College Historic District		1938	W. 12th Street, Davenport; 41°31′48″N 90°35′52″W	Queen Anne, others	Multiple	The former Marycrest College campus. It includes the Petersen Mansion.
Old St. Mary's Rectory		1854	610 E. Jefferson Street, Iowa City; 41°39′48″N 91°31′54″W	Greek Revival		Original wood frame rectory for St. Mary's parish in Iowa City. It was moved to E. Jefferson Street when the current rectory was built. A private residence today
Regina Coeli Monastery		1916	1401 Central Avenue, Bettendorf; 41°31′51″N 90°30′45″W	Mission Revival; Spanish Revival; Romanesque Revival; Late Gothic Revival	Arthur Ebeling	Now a drug and alcohol rehab facility. Former residence for Carmelite nuns from 1916 to 1975 and later for Franciscan brothers. It was then a hotel.
Sacred Heart Cathedral		1891	422 E. 10th Street, Davenport; 41°31′49″N 90°34′8″W	Late 19th and 20th Century Revivals, Gothic Revival, Tudor Gothic	James J. Egan	Historic complex includes the cathedral church, the rectory and the former convent
St. Anthony's Church		Original church: 1838; Present church: 1853	407 and 417 Main Street, Davenport; 41°31′26″N 90°34′31″W	Greek Revival	Multiple	First parish church in the diocese. Its original building is the oldest church building in use in Iowa. The historic complex includes both the original and current church.
St. Boniface Church		1908	2500 N. Pershing Boulevard, Clinton; 41°52′27″N 90°10′50″W	Gothic Revival	Martin Heer	Houses the Catholic Historical Center at St. Boniface. Parish merged with the other four Clinton parishes in 1990 to form Jesus Christ, Prince of Peace Parish. The parish used the building until 2007.
St. Irenaeus Church		1871	2811 N. 2nd Street, Clinton; 41°52′42″N 90°10′39″W	Gothic Revival	W.W. Sanborn	Vacant building. The parish merged with the other four Clinton parishes in 1990 to form Jesus Christ, Prince of Peace Parish. The parish used it until 2008.
Church of St. John the Baptist		1885	712 Division Street, Burlington; 40°48′28″N 91°6′31″W	Gothic Revival	William John Dillenburg	Parish church for Divine Mercy Parish after the Burlington-area parishes consolidated in 2017.
St. Joseph's Church		1876	1 mile east of the junction of County Road G76 and SE. 97th Street, Marion County; 41°12′12″N 93°18′29″W	Romanesque Revival, Late Gothic Revival		Part of an historic district that also includes the cemetery. The parish closed in the 1990s.
St. Joseph's Church		1883	601 N. Marquette Street, Davenport; 41°31′33″N 90°35′24″W	Gothic Revival	Victor Hout	Now owned by an Evangelical Christian outreach ministry
St. Joseph's Church		1886	509 Avenue F, Fort Madison; 40°37′54.03″N 91°18′24.2″W	Gothic Revival		Now a wedding chapel. The church, rectory, convent and school buildings are part of an historic district.
St. Joseph Hospital		1925	312 E. Alta Vista Avenue and 317 Vanness Avenue, Ottumwa; 41°02′13.83″N 92°23′56.84″W			Former hospital campus operated by the Sisters of Humility
St. Mary's Academy		1888	1334 W. 8th Street, Davenport; 41°31′40″N 90°35′38″W	Romanesque Revival		Former school building for St. Mary's parish. It became a residence for clergy teaching at St. Ambrose Academy and later Assumption High School. It was sold by the diocese.
St. Mary's Church		1885	516, 519, 522, and 525 Fillmore Street, Davenport; 41°31′30″N 90°35′39″W	Romanesque Revival, Colonial Revival	Victor Hout, Clause & Burrows	Included in the historic complex with rectory, convent, and school buildings
St. Mary of the Assumption Church		1871	1031 Avenue E, Fort Madison; 40°38′0″N 91°19′0″W	Gothic Revival	Walch & Schmidt	Part of Holy Family Parish in Fort Madison
St. Mary's Church		1867	220 E. Jefferson Street, Iowa City; 41°39′46″N 91°31′54″W	Romanesque Revival		Complex includes the church and rectory buildings
St. Mary's Church		1920	314 Grand Avenue, Nichols; 41°28′41″N 91°18′32″W	Gothic Revival		
St. Mary's Church		1907	41 St. Mary's Street, Riverside; 41°29′0″N 91°34′54″W	Late Gothic Revival, Romanesque Revival, Colonial Revival	Multiple	Part of an historic district that also includes the rectory, the original church building and the former school building
St. Michael's Church		1867	County Road F 52, Holbrook; 41°35′24″N 91°54′48″W	Late Gothic Revival, Romanesque Revival, Colonial Revival	Multiple	Part of a historic district that includes the cemetery, rectory and Ancient Order of Hibernians Hall. The parish closed in the 1990s.
St. Patrick's Church		1912	U.S. Route 34 west of Albia, Georgetown; 41°0′48″N 92°57′20″W	Gothic Revival	Rev. Timothy Clifford	
St. Paul's Church		1895	508 N. 4th Street; Burlington; 40°48′43.32″N 91°6′10.11″W	Gothic Revival	James J. Egan	Part of Divine Mercy Parish since the Burlington-area parishes consolidated in 2017.
Saints Peter and Paul Church		1898	Southeast of Harper, Clear Creek; 41°18′19″N 92°0′20″W	Gothic Revival	Ferdinand S. Borgolte	Former parish church. The parish merged with St. Elizabeth in Harper and St. Mary's in Keota to form Holy Trinity Parish in 1992. In 2009, the building was sold.
Saints Peter and Paul Catholic Church		1916	1165 NE. Taft Avenue, Solon; 41°50′57″N 91°27′49″W	Late 19th and 20th Century Revivals	R. K. Parkinson	Former parish church. The parish consolidated in 1996 with St. Mary's in Solon. Building was sold.
St. Thomas More Parish Center		1929	108 McLean Street, Iowa City; 41°40′09.9″N 91°32′30″W	Tudor Revival	Myron Edwards Pugh	Built as Sigma Pi fraternity house in 1929, the building served as the first Catholic Student Center and Newman Club at the University of Iowa. It went to St. Thomas More Parish in 1969. An apartment building since 2009.
Selma Schricker House		1902	1430 Clay Street, Davenport; 41°31′49.89″N 90°35′41.77″W	Georgian Revival	Clausen & Clausen	Residence of Bishops Rohlman, Hayes, O'Keefe and Franklin.

== Education ==
As of 2026, the Diocese of Davenport had 17 preschools, 13 elementary schools and five high schools.

=== High schools ===
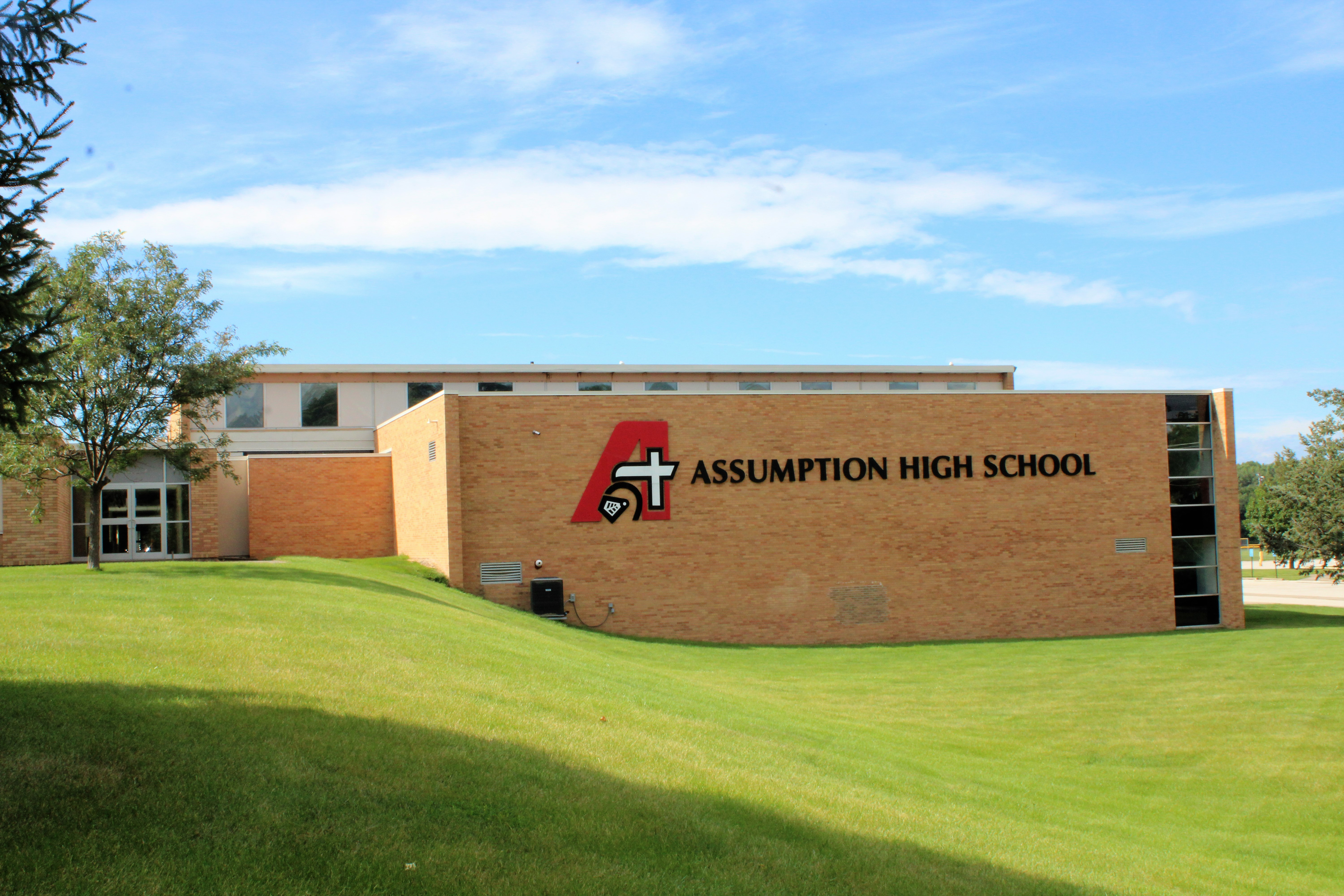
Assumption High School (2022)

School	Location
Assumption High School	Davenport
Holy Trinity JR/SR High School	Fort Madison
Burlington Notre Dame High School	Burlington
Prince of Peace Catholic School	Clinton
Regina High School	Iowa City
