= Michael Owen Jackels =

Roman Catholic priest, bishop, and archbishop

His Excellency, Most Reverend Michael Owen Jackels
- Metropolitan Archbishop emeritus of Dubuque
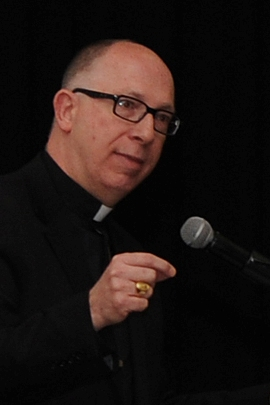
- Jackels in 2013
- Church: Catholic Church
- Archdiocese: Dubuque
- Appointed: April 8, 2013
- Installed: May 30, 2013
- Retired: April 4, 2023
- Predecessor: Jerome Hanus
- Successor: Thomas Robert Zinkula
- Previous post: Bishop of Wichita (2005–2013)

Orders
- Ordination: May 30, 1981 by Glennon P. Flavin
- Consecration: April 4, 2005 by Joseph F. Naumann, Fabian Bruskewitz, and Thomas Olmsted

Personal details
- Born: April 13, 1954 (age 72) Rapid City, South Dakota
- Education: St. Pius X Seminary; Mount St. Mary's Seminary; Pontifical University of Saint Thomas Aquinas
- Motto: Ecce adsum (English: Here I am)

Styles of Michael Owen Jackels
- Reference style: His Excellency; The Most Reverend
- Spoken style: Your Excellency
- Religious style: Archbishop

Ordination history of Michael Owen Jackels
History
Episcopal consecration
- Consecrated by: Joseph Naumann
- Date: April 4, 2005
Episcopal succession
Bishops consecrated by Michael Owen Jackels as principal consecrator
- Thomas Robert Zinkula: June 22, 2017
- William Michael Joensen: September 27, 2019

Michael Owen Jackels (born April 13, 1954) is an American Catholic prelate who served as Archbishop of Dubuque from 2013 to 2023. He previously served as Bishop of Wichita from 2005 to 2013.

== Early life and education ==
Michael Jackels was born in Rapid City, South Dakota, on April 13, 1954. A child of a military family, he lived in Wyoming, Spain and California before finally settling in Nebraska to complete his secondary studies. Jackels says that as a young man, he became a Buddhist. However, after reading a Bible from a Protestant co-worker at a country club, he decided to return to Catholicism.

Jackels attended the University of Nebraska–Lincoln, then entered St. Pius X Seminary in Kentucky in 1975. He earned his Bachelor of Philosophy degree from St. Pius X in 1977. In 1981, Jackels completed his Master of Theology degree at Mt. Saint Mary's Seminary in Emmitsburg, Maryland.

== Priesthood ==
Jackels was ordained a priest for the Diocese of Lincoln by Bishop Glennon Flavin on May 30, 1981. His first assignment was as the associate pastor of the Cathedral of the Risen Christ Parish and as a teacher at Pius X High School in Lincoln. From 1982 to 1985, Jackels was assigned as associate pastor of St. Thomas Aquinas Parish on the campus of the University of Nebraska–Lincoln. In addition to his teaching duties at Pius X High School, he also served as the assistant vocations director for the diocese during this period.

In 1985, Jackels embarked on doctoral studies at the Pontifical University of St. Thomas Aquinas in Rome, earning his Doctor of Sacred Theology degree in 1989. His dissertation was a study of Catherine of Siena.

After returning to Lincoln, Jackels served for the next eight years as the diocesan director of religious education, the master of ceremonies, the co-vicar for religious, and the chaplain for the School Sisters of Christ the King community in Lincoln. In 1994, Pope John Paul II named Jackels a prelate of honor, granting him the title of monsignor. Jackels returned to Rome in 1997 to work for the Congregation for the Doctrine of the Faith under then Cardinal Joseph Ratzinger, the future Pope Benedict XVI.

=== Bishop of Wichita ===
John Paul II appointed Jackels as bishop of the Diocese of Wichita in January, 2005. On April 4, 2005, Jackels was consecrated by Archbishop Joseph Naumann. Bishops Fabian Bruskewitz and Thomas J. Olmsted served as co-consecrators. Because of the size of the crowd in attendance and the small size of the Cathedral of the Immaculate Conception, Jackels' consecration took place at the larger Church of the Magdalen.

Jackels helped to establish the St. Katherine Drexel School Fund, which aids financially strapped Catholic schools within the diocese.

=== Archbishop of Dubuque ===
On April 8, 2013, Pope Francis appointed Jackels as archbishop of the Archdiocese of Dubuque. He was installed by Archbishop Carlo Vigano, apostolic nuncio to the United States, on May 30, 2013, at the Church of the Nativity in Dubuque.

In 2019, Jackels experienced a heart attack and was hospitalized for six weeks, after which he returned to his duties.

=== Retirement ===
On April 4, 2023, Jackels resigned as archbishop of Dubuque for health reasons.

== Viewpoints ==
Jackels joined the other three Kansas bishops in approving a pastoral letter opposing embryonic stem cell research.

He has spoken against same-sex marriage and abortion rights for women as well. He also opposes the death penalty and has written about the need for more just immigration laws. Jackels also voted to approve language changes in the mass to bring the English translation into a better accord with the original Latin at the June 2006 meetings of the USCCB in Los Angeles.

== Episcopal succession ==
Catholic Church titles
Preceded by Jerome Hanus	Archbishop of Dubuque; 2013–2023	Succeeded by Thomas Robert Zinkula
Preceded by Thomas J. Olmsted	Bishop of Wichita; 2005–2013	Succeeded by Carl A. Kemme
