= Parish Apartments =

- Sigma Pi Fraternity House
- U.S. National Register of Historic Places
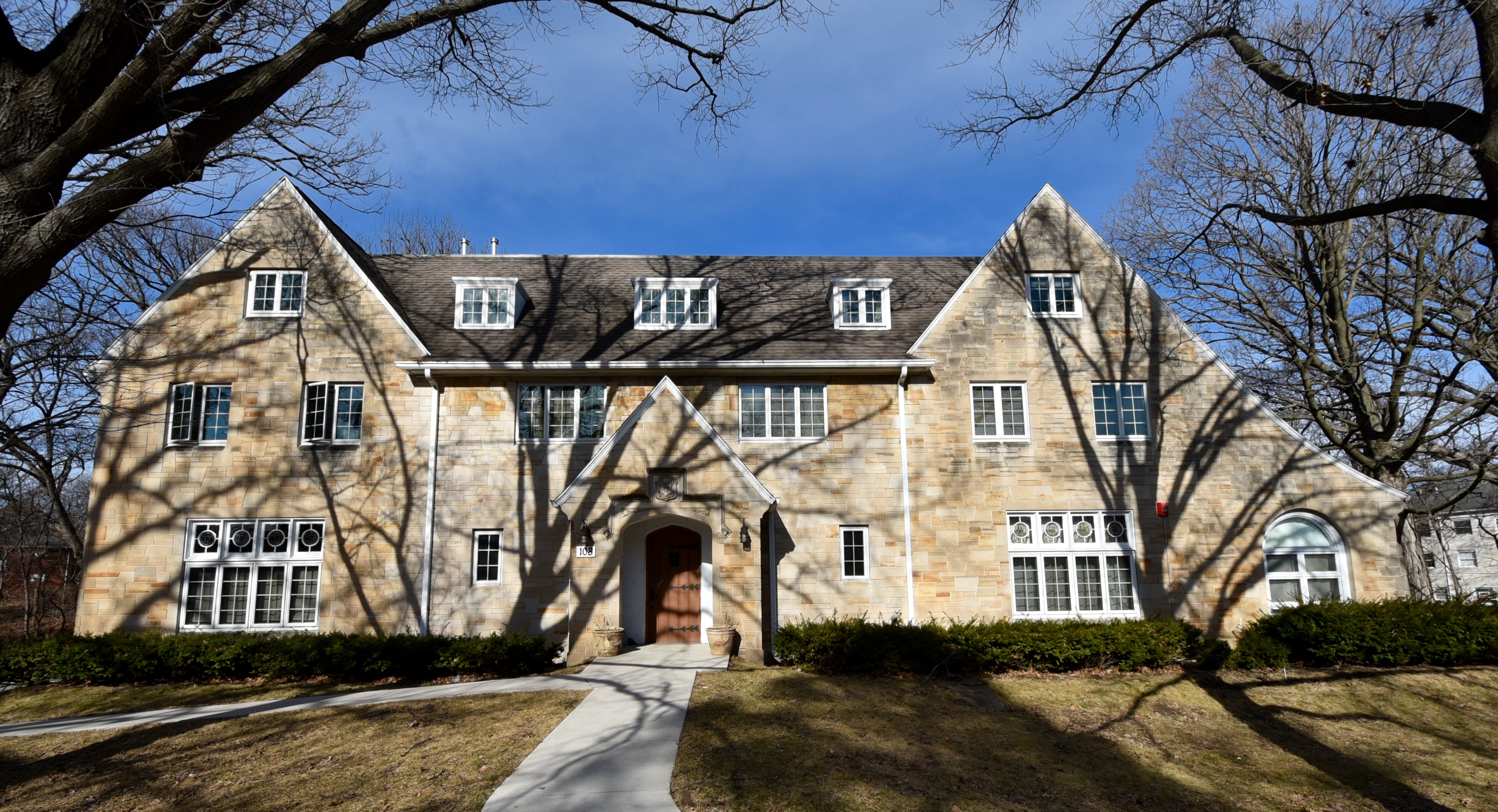

- Location within Iowa Location within the United States
- Location: 108 McLean St. Iowa City, Iowa
- Coordinates: 41°40′09.9″N 91°32′30″W
- Area: less than one acre
- Built: 1929
- Architectural style: Tudor Revival
- NRHP reference No.: 13001019
- Added to NRHP: December 31, 2013

Parish Apartments, also known as the Sigma Pi Fraternity House and the St. Thomas More Parish Center, is a historic building located in Iowa City, Iowa, United States. It was listed on the National Register of Historic Places in 2013 as the Sigma Pi Fraternity House.

== History ==
=== Fraternity ===
Located in the Manville Heights neighborhood, Parish Apartments was built as a fraternity house for Sigma Pi in 1929. The design for the three-story stone Tudor Revival structure is attributed to Madison, Wisconsin architect Myron Edwards Pugh. It was built at the height of fraternity house construction at the University of Iowa.

Xi Psi Phi fraternity joined Sigma Pi in the house in 1936, and Psi Omega joined two years later. The residency of these other fraternities was most likely due to a decline in enrollment during the Great Depression. It was not enough, however, as First Trust and Savings Bank of Davenport acquired the building at a sheriff's sale in 1943.

=== Catholic church ===
In 1945, the property was transferred to the Catholic Diocese of Davenport for use as the Catholic Student Center and Newman Club for Catholic students who were enrolled at the University of Iowa. Edna Mahan, a University of Iowa graduate, and president of the Diocesan Council of Catholic Women, was instrumental in securing the building. Bishop Henry Rohlman had established the student center in 1944 with Rev. Leonard Brugman as the first director.

Under the patronage of St. Thomas More, the building housed a chapel until 1947. A Quonset hut was used as a church from 1947 to 1965 when a new church was built on Riverside Drive under the direction of Rev. J. Walter McEleney. This building remained the student center until 1969 when the Rev. Robert Walter moved it to the former school building at St. Mary's Church and St. Thomas More became a territorial parish the following year. The parish continued to use the building as a parish center until it moved to Coralville in 2009.

=== University ===
The former church building was sold to the university for an organ and music concert hall. The building was converted into sixteen one-bedroom and studio apartments.

== See also ==
- North American fraternity and sorority housing
