= Milwaukee Railroad Shops Historic District =

Historic district in Iowa, United States

- Milwaukee Railroad Shops; Historic District
- U.S. National Register of Historic Places
- U.S. Historic district
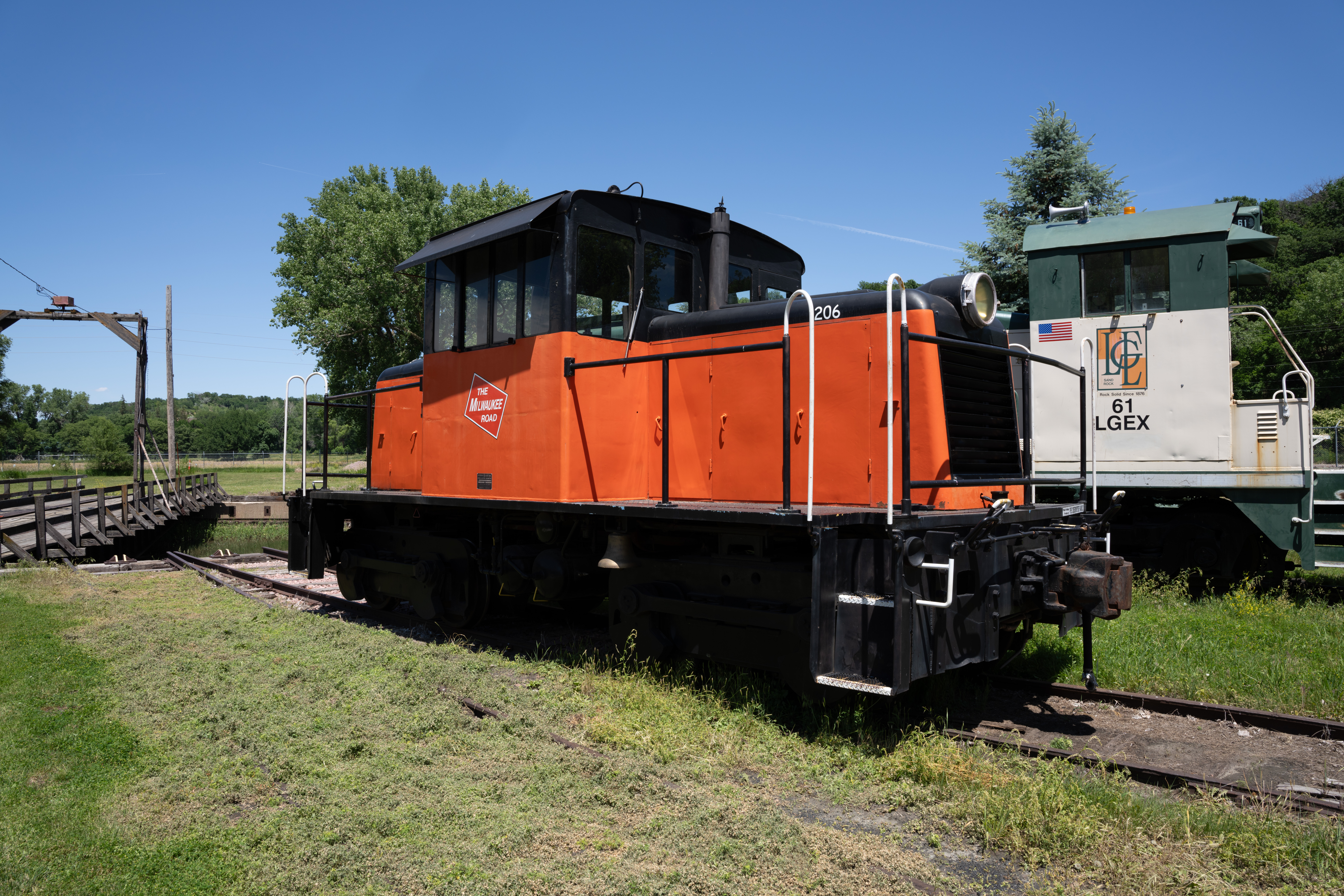
- A Milwaukee Road switcher at the museum

- Location within Iowa Location within the United States
- Location: 3400 Sioux River Rd. Sioux City, Iowa
- Coordinates: 42°31′38.6″N 96°28′34.3″W
- Area: 30 acres (12 ha)
- NRHP reference No.: 100002243
- Added to NRHP: October 22, 2018

The Milwaukee Railroad Shops Historic District, also known as the Sioux City Railroad Museum, is a nationally recognized historic district located in Sioux City, Iowa, United States. It was listed on the National Register of Historic Places in 2018. At the time of its nomination it contained 41 resources, which included six contributing buildings, 16 archaeological sites, six contributing structures, and 14 contributing objects.

The first railroad to arrive in town was the Sioux City and Pacific in 1868. Eventually, eight railroads would serve Sioux City before consolidations reduced the number to six, making the city the tenth largest rail center in the country in the 1920s and 1930s. In 1912 the Chicago, Milwaukee, St. Paul and Pacific Railroad (Milwaukee Road) announced they would build a repair shop terminal in Sioux City. Construction began in 1916 and it was completed two years later. At its height during World War II, the terminal employed 560 workers. They overhauled 35 steam locomotives a day, servicing over 70 trains a day, and maintained thousands of rail cars every year. By the mid-1950s the number of employees dropped to ten after the railroad's conversion to diesel engines was complete. The railroad tore down many of the obsolete buildings and structures beginning in 1954, and the roundhouse was reduced from 30 stalls to six. The Milwaukee Road filed for bankruptcy in 1977. They sold their property in Sioux City to a farm machinery salvage company in 1981, and by 1987 it fell into a state of disrepair.

The Siouxland Historical Railroad Association acquired the property in 1995 and converted the facility into a museum, incorporating the roundhouse. In 2024 the museum announced plans in conjunction with the American Heartland Railroad Society to restore Great Northern 4-6-2 No. 1355 to operation.
