= Holy Ghost Catholic Church (Dubuque, Iowa) =

Historic district in Iowa, United States

- Holy Ghost Catholic Historic District
- U.S. National Register of Historic Places
- U.S. Historic district
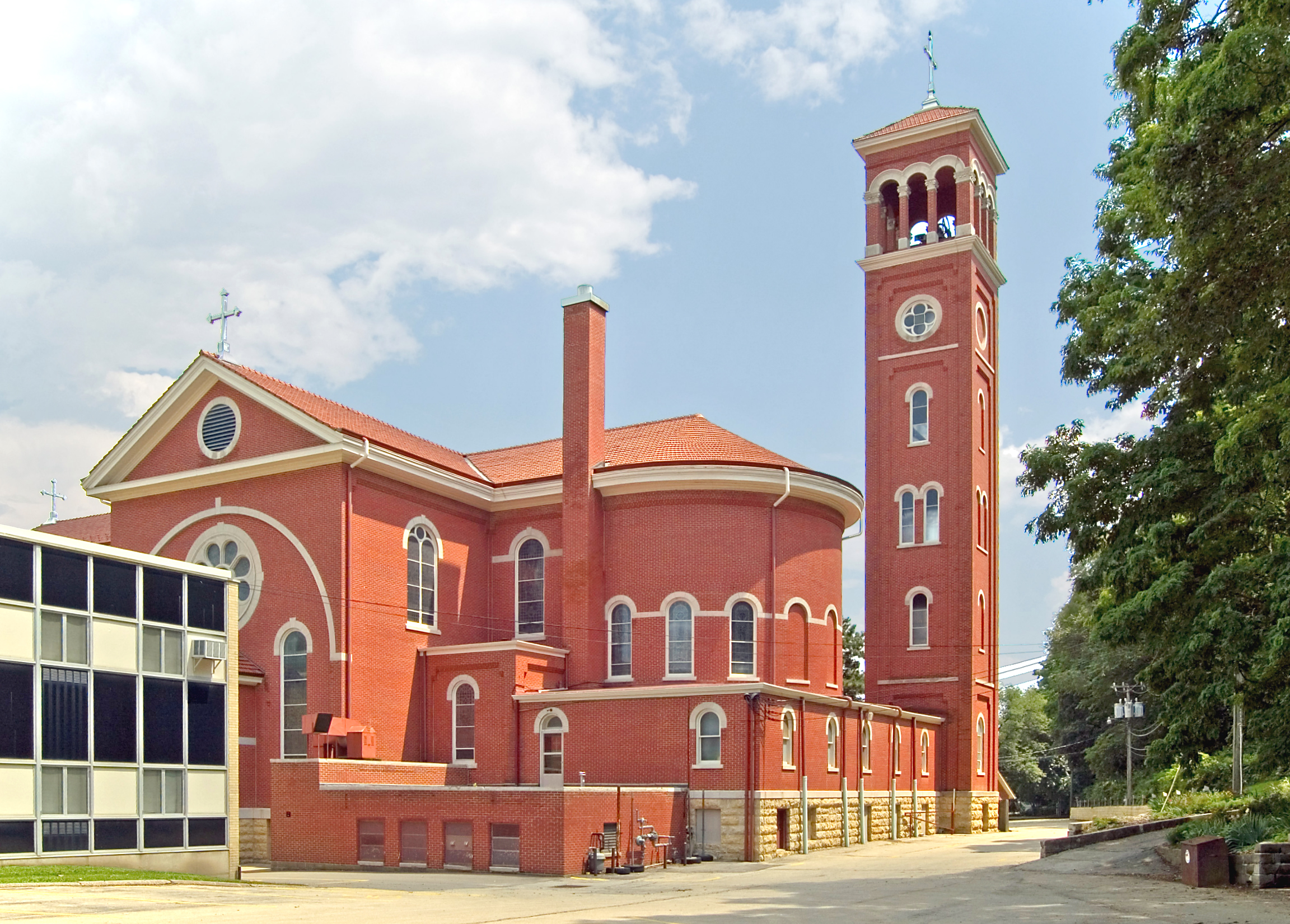
- Rear-view of Holy Ghost Church

- Location within Iowa Location within the United States
- Location: 2887-2921 Central Ave. Dubuque, Iowa
- Coordinates: 42°31′26″N 90°40′46″W
- Built: 1916 (church)
- Architect: Martin Heer; Guido Beck
- Architectural style: Romanesque Revival; Late 19th and 20th Century Revivals
- MPS: Dubuque, Iowa MPS
- NRHP reference No.: 11000661
- Added to NRHP: September 15, 2011

Holy Ghost Catholic Church is a Catholic parish located within the city of Dubuque, Iowa, United States. It is part of the Archdiocese of Dubuque. The church, school, rectory, and convent were listed together as a historic district on the National Register of Historic Places in 2011.

== History ==
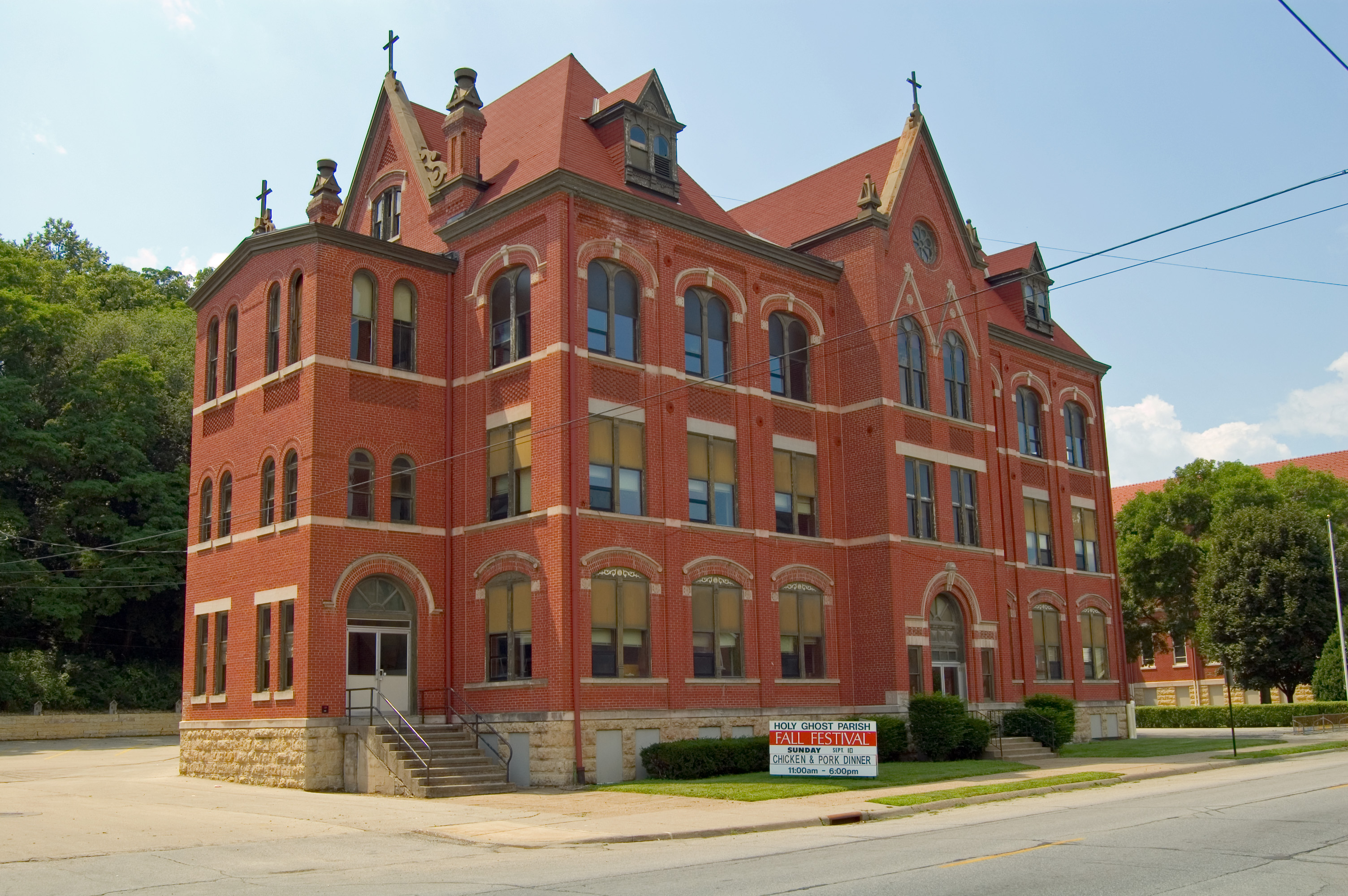
Elementary school next to church.

The parish was formed in 1896 in response to a population explosion in the northern parts of Dubuque. Sacred Heart Church had been established in 1879, and a new large church capable of seating 1,100 was built in 1888. But within a few years church officials realized that even with a new building that Sacred Heart wasn't able to keep up with the growing population. In response Holy Ghost parish was formed.

A combination church and school structure was built at the 2900th block of what today is known as Central Avenue. Within a few years a large church building designed by Guido Beck was built just to the north of the old building.

In July 2001, Wahlert High School and all Dubuque Catholic Elementary Schools and the Catholic Early Childhood Centers, joined to become a system called Holy Family Catholic Schools. This resulted in the consolidation of and closure of several long time schools, including Holy Trinity, Nativity, Sacred Heart, St. Joseph Key West, St. Joseph The Worker, St. Mary's, and St. Patrick's. Besides Holy Ghost, the other remaining elementary schools are Resurrection Elementary School, St. Anthony Elementary School, and St. Columbkille Elementary School.
