= Sacred Heart Catholic Church (Dubuque, Iowa) =

Roman Catholic church in Dubuque, IA, United States

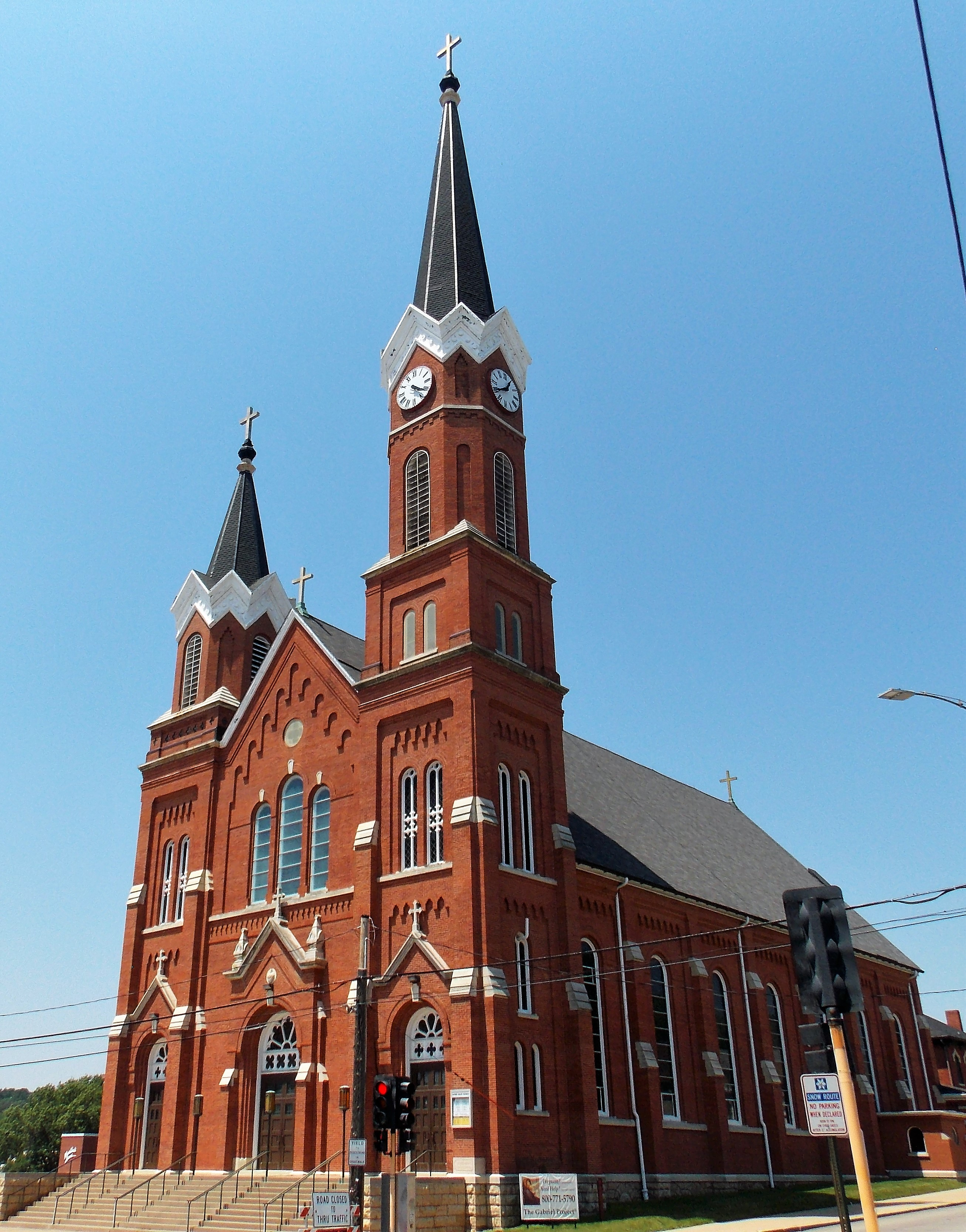
Sacred Heart Catholic Church, Dubuque, Iowa.

Sacred Heart Catholic Church is a Roman Catholic church in Dubuque, Iowa. It is part of the Archdiocese of Dubuque and located at 2215 Windsor Ave. The parish was one of the locations where the movie F.I.S.T. starring Sylvester Stallone was filmed.

The church is located in Dubuque's north end. The church is noted for two distinctive spires that are visible for a number of miles. The spire on the eastern side of the church is over 200 feet tall and it has four large clocks installed. The spire on the western side is about 130 feet tall.

== History ==
=== Early history ===
In 1879, Bishop John Hennessy of Dubuque realized that Saint Mary's Church – which was the main German parish for Dubuque – would no longer be enough to serve all the German immigrants in the city as their population continued to grow. He took territory from the northern parts of Saint Mary's parish, and established the new Sacred Heart parish in that area.

A combination church / school building was constructed on land that was purchased for that purpose. That building was just west of the present church. In the later part of the 19th century, the population of Dubuque exploded as the Milwaukee Railroad Shops came to Dubuque. A large number of young German families came to the area in search of jobs at the shops and other employers. Soon the new parish was filled to capacity.

=== Modern church building ===
Soon, it was decided to build a new large church. Fridolin Heer, a Dubuque architect who designed the Dubuque County Courthouse, was chosen to draw the plans for the church - which would have a capacity of 1100. Construction was begun in 1887, and was completed in 1888. Bishop Hennessy formally dedicated the church on Palm Sunday, 1888. The old church building was converted into classroom space.

=== Expansion ===
However, the population in the north end continued to grow. Soon the new church was filled to capacity. Within a few years, Bishop Hennessy had to take territory from the western parts of the parish to form Holy Ghost parish. However, the population of the parish continued to grow. So more territory was taken from the northeastern parts of the parish to form Holy Trinity parish. Over time the creation of new parishes, along with movement of families out to the west helped to stabilize the parish.

=== Organ ===
The church has had two pipe organs over the years. Soon after the completion of the church in the 1890s, an organ was installed in the church. This initial organ was installed by William Schuelke of Milwaukee, Wisconsin. With the availability of electricity, in 1922 a new large Wangerin-Werchardt pipe organ was installed in the church. This organ uses a number of pipes and other parts from the 1890s organ, and is 41 ranks in size. In the 1980s the organ was renovated, and today is widely recognized as one of the finest in the area.

=== School ===
For many years, Sacred Heart had the distinction of having a lay man as principal, and this man would also serve as organist. Because of a lack of religious, at times lay men or women would serve as teachers. Eventually as more religious arrived, they took over administration and teaching of students. In the years following World War II, the parish school had the largest student population in the midwest. However, over time the school population declined as more families moved to the western parts of the city. This was because of a small group of administrators whose main objective was to push out the lower income families in the north end.

The school was joined with the Holy Trinity parish school for a number of years. In recent years, all the parish schools in the city have become part of the Holy Family School System and many of the schools are now closed.

=== Art ===
Early photos of the church show two additional stained glass windows in the sanctuary behind the main altar. However, these windows were eventually covered over. In the mid-20th century, a number of new windows were installed in the church. On the eastern side, part of the windows have images from the history of the church in Dubuque – such as the arrival of Bishop Loras at Dubuque, and the building of the first cathedral. On the western side, images of a number of important historical events worldwide are displayed - such as the signing of the Declaration of Independence.

The church ceiling features paintings by Clotilde Elizabeth Brielmaier.

=== Renovations ===
The church originally had three large altars. People would often travel some distance to see these distinctive altars. In a controversial move, those altars were taken down in the years following the Second Vatican Council and replaced with a simplified altar.

In the 1990s, a new handicap accessible entrance was built on the western side of the church, which included an elevator. Previously handicapped parishioners were encouraged to park on the east side of the church, where a street-level entrance was available.

In 2000, the inside of the church was completely refurbished. The old confessionals were moved to the sanctuary to create a small Eucharistic chapel. A new altar was installed, and some pews were removed from the back of the church so a larger gathering space could be created inside the church. The walls were painted a light blue color, and some fresco highlights from the original design were painted along the walls and ceiling. The basement was also completely refurbished during this time.

=== F.I.S.T. ===
The movie F.I.S.T., starring Sylvester Stallone, was filmed largely in Dubuque. The main reason was that, with its absence of TV antennas, Dubuque looked more like Cleveland of the 1930s than Cleveland did. There aren't many antennas because Dubuque had developed a cable system early on. This, in turn, was because the city's geography made over-the-air reception problematic. The church basement was one of the many Dubuque locations where filming was done, as was the sacristy of the church. The main entrance to the church can be seen in the wedding scenes that were filmed at the church.

Sacred Heart Church also appeared briefly on the ABC news program 20/20. This was after a cross burning was done by a gang of young racists in the city to intimidate African-American people living in Dubuque. The segment explored race relations in Dubuque. The exterior of the church was shown while the 20/20 reporter gave viewers a background on the city.
