= Jerome Hanus =

American prelate

His Excellency The Most Reverend Jerome George Hanus O.S.B.
- Archbishop Emeritus of Dubuque
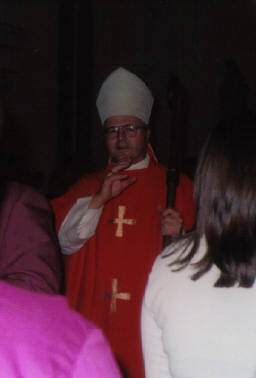
- Archdiocese: Dubuque
- Appointed: August 23, 1994
- Installed: October 16, 1995
- Retired: April 8, 2013
- Predecessor: Daniel Kucera
- Successor: Michael Jackels
- Previous posts: Coadjutor Archbishop of Dubuque (1994–1995); Bishop of Saint Cloud (1987–1994); Abbot of Conception Abbey (1977–1987)

Orders
- Ordination: July 30, 1966 by Gerald Thomas Bergan
- Consecration: August 24, 1987 by John Roach, John Joseph Sullivan, and George Henry Speltz

Personal details
- Born: May 26, 1940 (age 86) Brainard, Nebraska, US
- Parents: Leo A. Hanus & Kristine Polak
- Education: Conception Seminary; Princeton University; Pontifical University of St. Anselm
- Motto: Prodesse magis quam praeesse (To serve rather than to rule)
- Coat of arms

Styles of Jerome George Hanus
- Reference style: His Excellency; The Most Reverend
- Spoken style: Your Excellency
- Religious style: Archbishop

Ordination history of Jerome Hanus
History
Episcopal consecration
- Consecrated by: John Roach
- Date: August 24, 1987
Episcopal succession
Bishops consecrated by Jerome Hanus as principal consecrator
- R. Walker Nickless: January 20, 2006

Jerome George Hanus, O.S.B. (born May 26, 1940) is an American prelate of the Roman Catholic Church, presiding as archbishop of the Archdiocese of Dubuque in Iowa from 1995 until 2013.

A member of the Order of Saint Benedict, Hanus served as abbot of Conception Abbey from 1977 to 1987. He also served as bishop of the Diocese of Saint Cloud in Minnesota from 1987 to 1994 and coadjutor archbishop of the Archdiocese of Dubuque from 1994 to 1995.

== Biography ==
=== Early life and education ===
George Hanus was born on May 26, 1940, in Brainard, Nebraska, to Leo A. and Kristine (née Polak) Hanus. The third of eight children, he has three brothers and four sisters. He received his early education at parochial schools in Dwight, Nebraska, and Bellwood, Nebraska, Hanus graduated from St. John Vianney Seminary in Elkhorn, Nebraska in 1958.

Hanus joined the Order of Saint Benedict, at Conception Abbey in Conception, Missouri. He made his profession as a Benedictine monk on September 1, 1961, taking the name Jerome. Hanus studied at Conception Seminary College in Conception, Missouri, where he earned a Bachelor of Arts degree in 1963. He continued his studies at the Pontifical University of St. Anselm in Rome, receiving a Licentiate of Sacred Theology in 1967.

=== Priesthood ===
Hanus was ordained to the priesthood in the Order of Saint Benedict by Archbishop Gerald Bergan on July 30, 1966. After his ordination, Hanus taught scholastic theology at Conception Seminary College from 1967 to 1969. He studied moral theology at Princeton University, earning a Master of Arts degree in 1972. Hanus then returned to Conception Seminary, where he served as professor of religion from 1973 to 1976. From 1974 to 1976, Hanus was an adjunct professor of moral theology at the Pontifical University of St. Anselm.

Hanus was elected the sixth abbot of Conception Abbey on January 5, 1977, and received the abbatial blessing the next day. In addition to his role as abbot, he served as abbot president of the Swiss-American Congregation, to which the abbey belongs, from 1984 to 1987.

=== Bishop of Saint Cloud ===
Coat of arms as bihop of Saint Cloud

On July 6, 1987, Pope John Paul II appointed Jerome as the eighth bishop of Saint Cloud. He was consecrated on August 24, 1987, by Archbishop John Roach. Bishops John Sullivan and George Speltz were the principal co-consecrators.

=== Archbishop of Dubuque ===
On August 23, 1994, John Paul II appointed Hanus as the coadjutor archbishop of Dubuque. He was installed on October 27, 1994. In 1995, Archbishop Daniel Kucera sent his letter of resignation as archbishop of Dubuque to John Paul II, On October 16, 1995, Hanus automatically succeeded Kucera as the ninth archbishop of Dubuque.

As archbishop, Hanus implemented a strategic planning process throughout the archdiocese. He spoke to people in the archdiocese via videotaped messages played at mass in all the parishes. Parishioners received opportunities to respond and express their own views. Hanus then issued a vision statement, which spelled out his plans for the archdiocese. These plans included an increased role for the laity in leadership roles, necessitated by the priest shortage and the changing demographics of the archdiocese. These conditions also forced Hanus to combine and close a number of parishes.

On February 1, 2006, Hanus announced a $5 million financial settlement for 26 victims of sexual abuse by priests in the 1950s and 1960s in the archdiocese. Six deceased priests were mentioned in the document; the one living priest who was listed was later laicized.

On May 12, 2008, US Immigration and Customs Enforcement (ICE) raided the Agriprocessors meat packing plant in Postville, Iowa, detaining 398 employees who were overwhelmingly of Latino descent. In the wake of the raid, Hanus called for comprehensive immigration reform. He asked those attending at a prayer service to remember the scriptures;

"to treat the alien in your midst like your brother or sister, and that when you receive the alien, the foreigner, you are welcoming Christ."

In February 2012. Hanus suffered serious chest injuries when his car rolled over twice in a crash. Those injuries caused recurring body spasms that required hospitalizations and resulted in more arthritic pain.

== Retirement and legacy ==
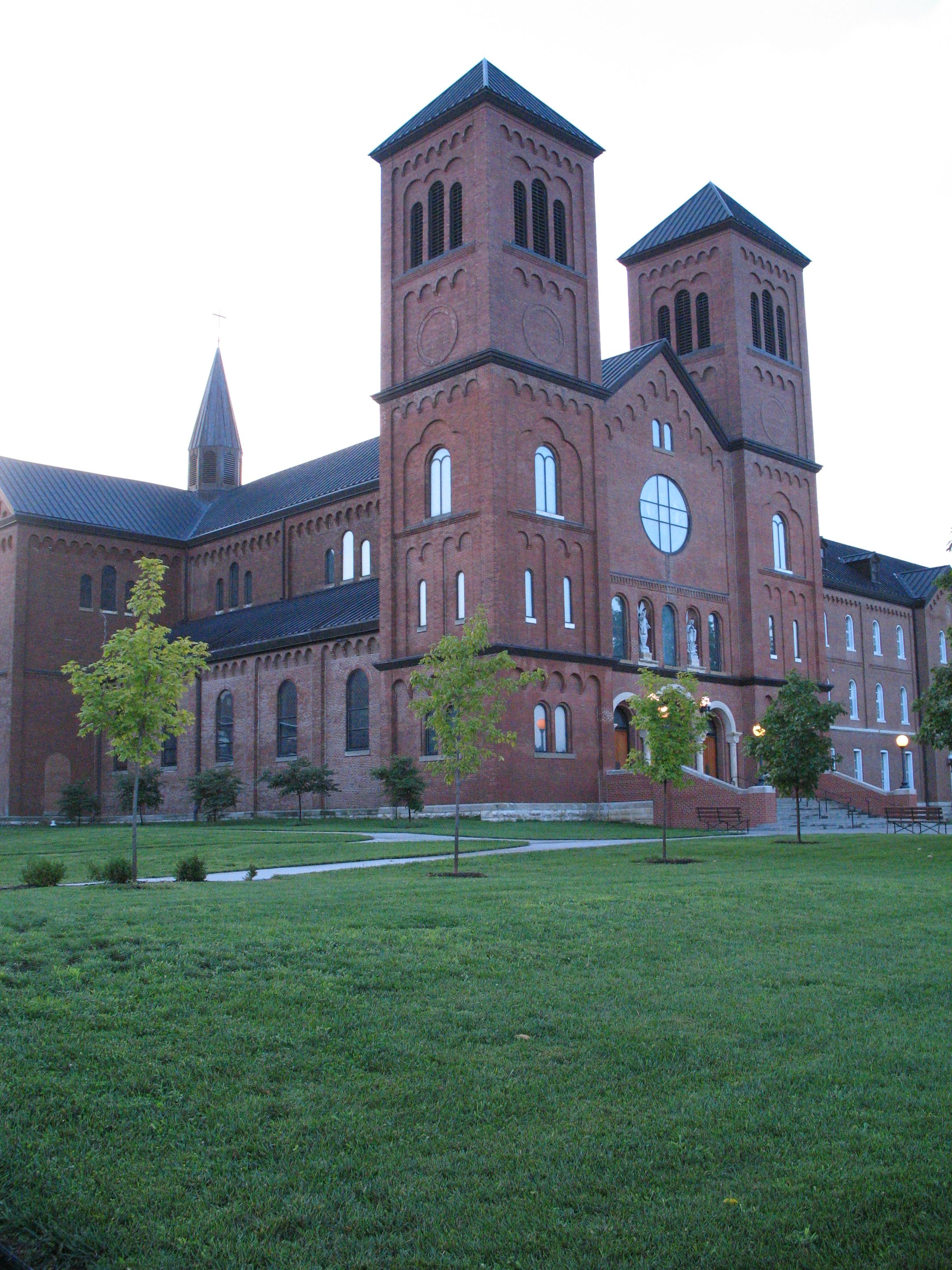
Conception Abbey, Conception, Missouri (2006)

Hanus submitted his resignation as archbishop for health reasons, which Pope Francis accepted. On April 8, 2013, Hanus announced that Francis had appointed Bishop Michael Jackels of the Diocese of Wichita to succeed him. Hanus acted as apostolic administrator for the archdiocese until Jackels was installed on May 30, after which he resumed his life as a monk in Missouri.

In April 2013, Hanus was scheduled to make a deposition in two sexual abuse lawsuits against Conception Abbey. The plaintiffs were two Missouri men who claimed that in the 1980s Reverend Bede Parry, a priest at the abbey, had abused them as boys. Hanus served as abbot of Conception Abbey during that period. The lawsuits claimed that Hanus met with Perry in 1981, before the alleged abuses occurred. In that meeting, Perry confessed to "inappropriate sexual relationships" with minors. Hanus ordered Perry to undergo psychological counseling, but allowed him to continue as the youth choir director. According to Perry, Hanus told him not to do it again.

== See also ==
- Catholic Church hierarchy
- Catholic Church in the United States
- Historical list of the Catholic bishops of the United States
- List of Catholic bishops of the United States
- Lists of patriarchs, archbishops, and bishops

== Episcopal succession ==
Catholic Church titles
Preceded by Daniel Kucera	Archbishop of Dubuque; 1994–2013	Succeeded by Michael Owen Jackels
Preceded by George Henry Speltz	Bishop of Saint Cloud; 1987–1994	Succeeded by John Francis Kinney
