= Archdiocese of Dubuque =

Latin Catholic jurisdiction in the US

Archdiocese of Dubuque Archidiœcesis Dubuquensis
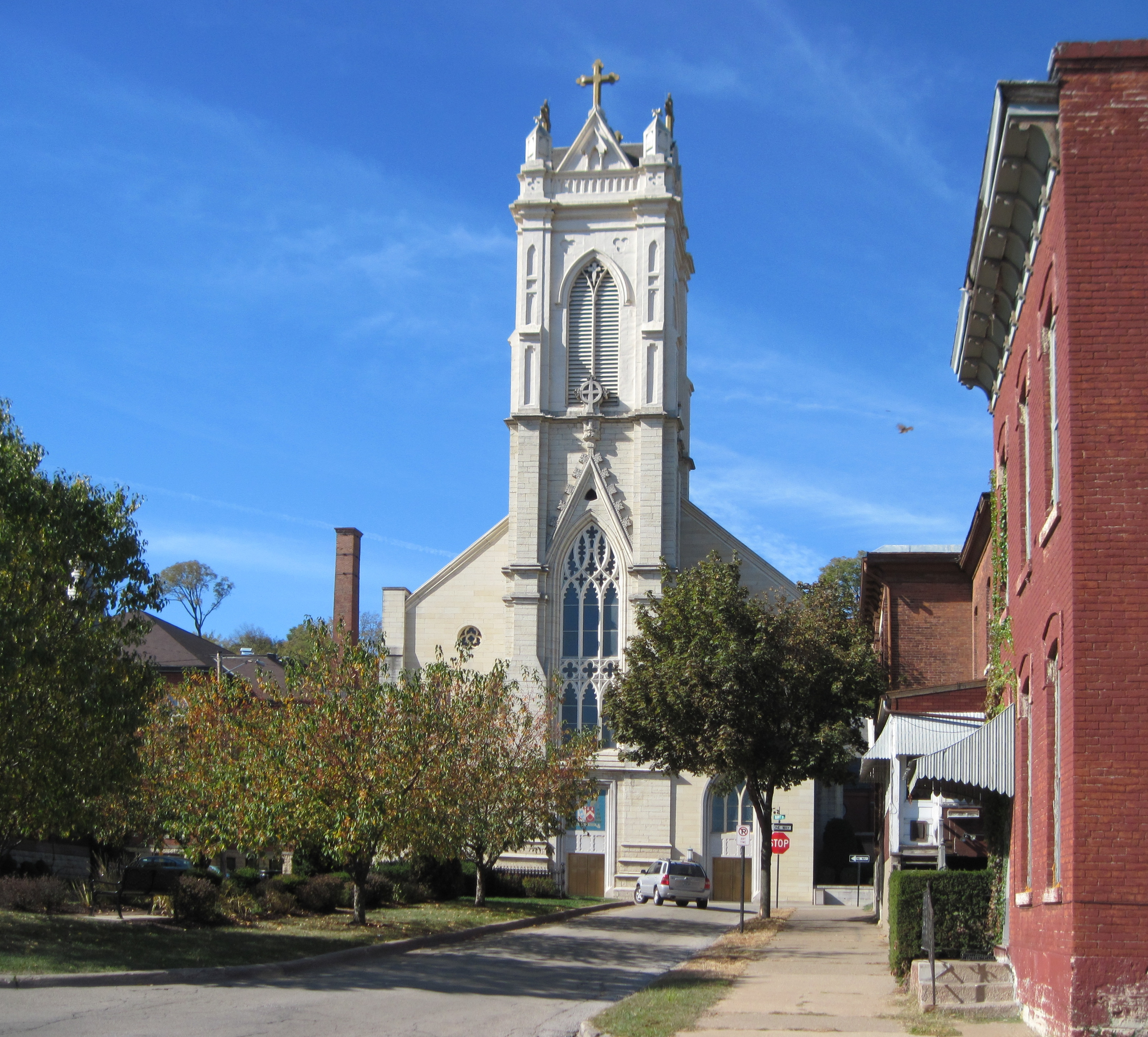
- St. Raphael's Cathedral

- Coat of arms

Location
- Country: United States
- Territory: 30 counties in Northeastern Iowa
- Ecclesiastical province: Dubuque
- Coordinates: 42°29′06″N 90°40′31″W

Statistics
- Area: 17,400 sq mi (45,000 km^{2})
- Population: Total; Catholics: (as of 2018); 1,010,471; 193,360 (19.1%)
- Parishes: 166

Information
- Denomination: Catholic
- Sui iuris church: Latin Church
- Rite: Roman Rite
- Established: July 28, 1837 (188 years ago)
- Cathedral: St. Raphael's Cathedral
- Patron saint: St. Raphael; St. John Vianney

Current leadership
- Pope: Leo XIV
- Archbishop: Thomas Robert Zinkula
- Metropolitan Archbishop: Thomas Robert Zinkula
- Vicar General: Rev. Msgr. Thomas E. Toale, Ph.D.
- Bishops emeritus: Jerome Hanus, O.S.B. Michael Owen Jackels

Map
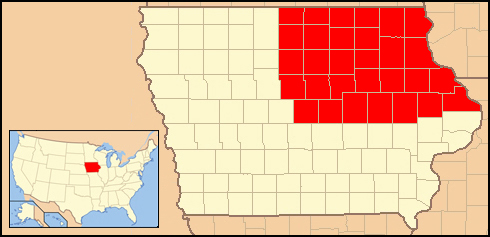

Website
- dbqarch.org

The Archdiocese of Dubuque (Latin: Archidiœcesis Dubuquensis) is an archdiocese of the Catholic Church in the northeastern quarter of the state of Iowa in the United States. Erected in 1837, the diocese was elevated to an archdiocese in 1893. It is a metropolitan archdiocese with three suffragan dioceses.

== Territory and personnel ==
The seat of the archdiocese is St. Raphael's Cathedral in Dubuque, named in honor of the Archangel Raphael. As of 2024, the archbishop is Thomas Zinkula.

The archdiocese is one of a few American archdioceses that is not based in a major metropolitan area. It includes all the Iowa counties north of Polk, Jasper, Poweshiek, Iowa, Johnson, Cedar, and Clinton counties, and east of Kossuth, Humboldt, Webster and Boone counties. It has an area of approximately 17,400 square miles (45,000 km^{2}).

As of 2023, the archdiocese had 173 priests and 143 permanent deacons serving 163 parishes divided into eight deaneries. The archdiocese had a Catholic population of approximately 183,700.

== History ==
=== 1673 to 1837 ===
The first Catholic presence in present-day Iowa was that of the French Jesuit missionary, Jacques Marquette. He traveled down the Mississippi River with the French explorer Louis Jolliet in 1673, stopping briefly at what is now Montrose in southern Iowa. The region would be under French and Spanish control for the next 131 years.

After the Louisiana Purchase of 1803, the Iowa region passed from French to American control. The few Catholics in the area were originally under the jurisdiction of the Diocese of Louisiana and the Two Floridas. In 1826, the Vatican transferred the Iowa region to the new Diocese of St. Louis. It would remain under this jurisdiction for the next 11 years.

The earliest Catholic settlers in the Iowa region were French-Canadian, German, and Irish. With the growth of the Catholic population, Bishop Joseph Rosati of St. Louis sent the Belgian Jesuit Charles Van Quickenborne to the newly founded Dubuque in 1833, where he organized the first parish. He was followed in 1834 by Charles Fitzmaurice, who began amassing funds to construct a church. When Fitzmaurice died of cholera in early 1835, Rosatis sent the Dominican friar Samuel Mazzuchelli to replace him.

Mazzuchelli ministered to a scattered Catholic population of under 3,000. In 1835, he dedicated the first church in the present day archdiocese, which he named St. Raphael.

=== 1837 to 1850 ===
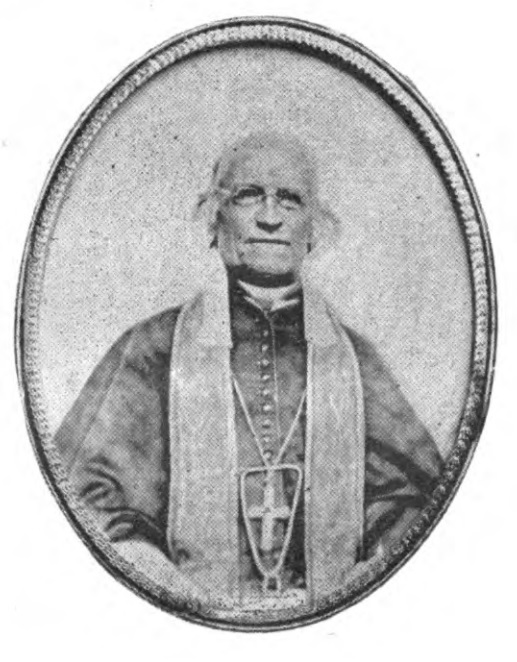
Bishop Loras

Pope Gregory XVI erected the Diocese of Dubuque on July 28, 1837, and named Mathias Loras from the Diocese of Mobile as its first bishop. This vast diocese covered the entire Iowa Territory along with what became the Minnesota Territory (including the Dakotas).

Gathering funds and personnel in Alabama, Loras arrived in Dubuque in 1839. He designated St. Raphael as the cathedral parish later that year. That same year, he establish St. Raphael Seminary in Dubuque, which in later years would become Loras College. Loras encouraged immigration to the area, especially German and Irish settlers.

Loras invited several religious orders to the diocese. In 1843, while visiting Baltimore, Loras met with several Sisters of Charity of the Blessed Virgin Mary. He convinced them to come to Dubuque, where they founded St. Joseph's Academy for girls. It became Clarke University in 1881. In 1849, with Ireland ravaged by the Great Famine, Irish Cistercians came to Iowa and built the New Melleray Abbey in Peosta.

=== 1850 to 1865 ===
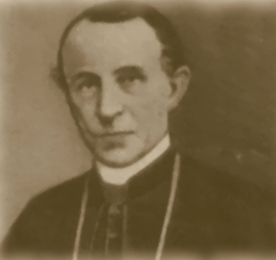
Bishop Smyth

In 1850, Pope Pius IX separated the Minnesota Territory from the Diocese of Dubuque to form the new Diocese of St. Paul. On January 9, 1857, at Loras's request, Pius IX appointed Clement Smyth, a Trappist priest, to assist Loras as a coadjutor bishop. In early 1858, Loras started the construction of the current St. Raphael's Cathedral. When Loras died on February 19, 1958, Smyth automatically succeeded him as the second bishop of Dubuque.

As the diocese expanded, Smyth successfully recruited Irish priests to the diocese, primarily from All Hallows College in Dublin. This caused discontent among the French-born priests in Dubuque, with many of them transferring to other dioceses. In 1863, Smyth consecrated Ephraim McDonnell as the first abbot for New Melleray after the Vatican elevated to an abbey. During his episcopacy the German Catholics in Dubuque began construction of a new St. Mary's church to replace the Church of the Holy Trinity.

In 1863, during the American Civil War, Smyth learned about a branch of the Knights of the Golden Circle (KCG) in Dubuque, a secret paramilitary society with sympathies for the Confederate South. Smyth told Catholic members of KCG to either quit the organization or be excommunicated. Smyth preached a stinging sermon after the assassination of President Abraham Lincoln on April 15, 1865. That evening, an arsonist set fire to Smyth's carriage house, killing his horses and destroying his carriage and the structure.

=== 1865 to 1893 ===
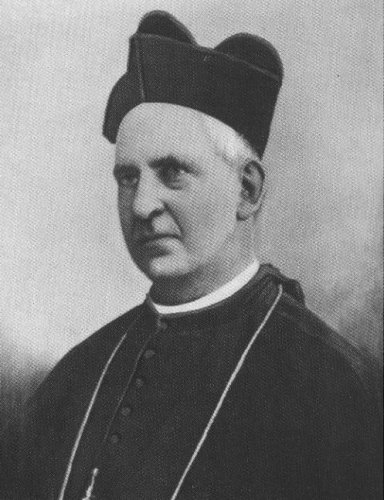
Archbishop Hennessy

Smyth died in 1865. On April 24, 1866, Pius IX appointed John Hennessey of Saint Louis as the third bishop of Dubuque. When he arrived in Dubuque, there were 27 priests, 30 churches, two schools and seven sisters.

During Hennessy's tenure, the population of Dubuque exploded as the Milwaukee Railroad opened a maintenance center in the city. Hennessey erected Sacred Heart, Holy Ghost, St. Anthony's, and Holy Trinity Parishes in Dubuque to deal with this population increase. In 1871, Nicholas E. Gonner, a Catholic immigrant from Luxembourg, founded the Catholic Printing Company in Dubuque, That same year, he started publishing the German language Luxemburger Gazette. In 1878, the Sisters of the Third Order of St. Francis of the Holy Family relocated from Iowa City to Dubuque to staff St. Mary's Orphan Home.

Hennessy was a strong proponent of Catholic education, terming public schools as "dens of iniquity" and "gates of hell".

Both Smyth and Hennessy believed that the diocese was becoming too big and should be split up. He proposed that the Vatican erect a new diocese in southern Iowa based in Des Moines. However, in 1881, Pope Leo XIII instead erected the Diocese of Davenport in southern Iowa.

By 1891, the diocese had 203 priests, 319 churches, 615 sisters, and over 135 parochial schools with 16,257 students.

=== 1893 to 1944 ===
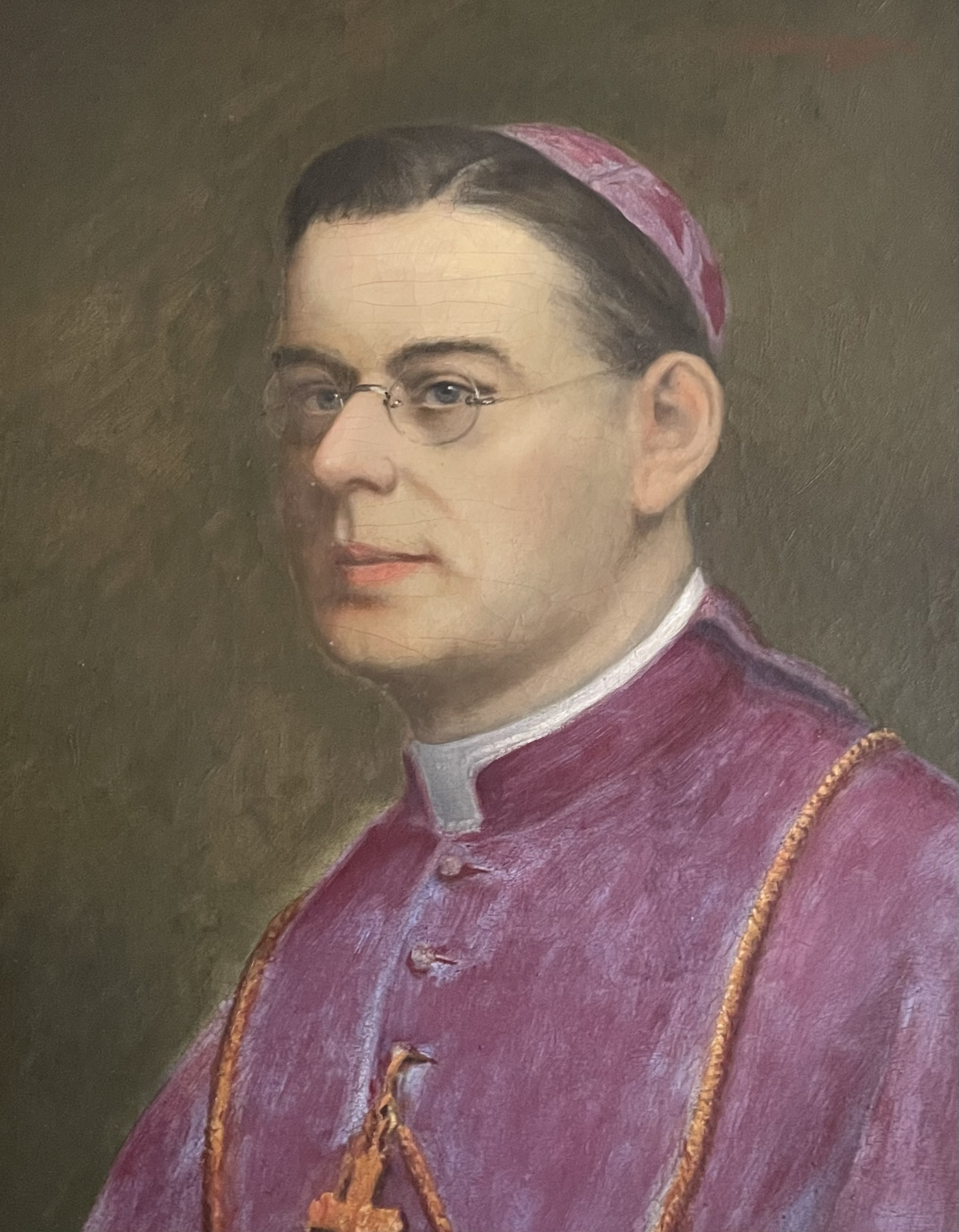
Archbishop Beckman

On June 15, 1893, Pope Leo XIII elevated the Diocese of Dubuque to the Archdiocese of Dubuque and Hennessey became the first archbishop. Hennessey died in 1900 and was buried in the mortuary vault that he had constructed under the cathedral. When Hennessey will was read, he had an estate of property and bank accounts exceeding $1,000,000. Since he was poor when assuming office, it was widely assumed that Hennessy had been taking money from the archdiocese.

After the death of Hennessey, Pope Pius X on July 24, 1900, appointed John J. Keane, titular archbishop of Damascus, as the second archbishop of Dubuque.

On January 15, 1902, Pius X erected the Diocese of Sioux City from the western half of the archdiocese. During his tenure as archbishop, John Keane encouraged postgraduate courses and ongoing education for priests, and doubled the faculty and buildings of St. Joseph's College. He established 12 academies for girls and two for boys in the archdiocese. Due to poor health, Keene resigned as archbishop of Dubuque in 1911.

To succeed John Keene, on August 11, 1911, Pius X appointed Bishop James Keane from the Diocese of Cheyenne as the next archbishop of Dubuque. One of James Keane's interests as archbishop was Columbia College, later called Loras College. When he came to Dubuque, Columbia had an enrollment of 330 students and a faculty of 20. By the time he died, Columbia had 700 students and 48 faculty members.

A strong believer in Catholic education, James Keane encouraged all Catholics in the archdiocese to support the parochial schools, even if they did not have children attending them. He also started the diocesan newspaper, the Witness. In 1928, the Sisters of Mercy opened Mount Mercy Junior College in Cedar Rapids. It was a two-year college for women that in 1960 became Mount Mercy University. Keene died on August 2, 1929.

On January 17, 1930, Pope Pius XI named Bishop Francis J. Beckman from the Diocese of Lincoln as archbishop of Dubuque. Impressed with the Catholic culture he had seen in Europe, Beckman began to collect fine art pieces. The Beckman collection includes works of Winslow Homer, Rembrandt, Rubens, and Van Dyck.

In 1936, promoter Phillip Suetter convinced Beckman to invest in a gold mine in Oregon. Beckman borrowed money on promissory notes to fund the project. It soon became clear that the project was a scam. In 1941, the Vatican ordered the creation of a Special Commission on Administration, composed of three American archbishops, to take control of the archdiocese's finances. In 1942, Suetter was convicted of violating the Securities and Exchange Act. With the diocese $600,000 in debt, the archbishops recommended to Pius XII that he appoint a coadjutor archbishop to run the archdiocese.

=== 1944 to 1984 ===
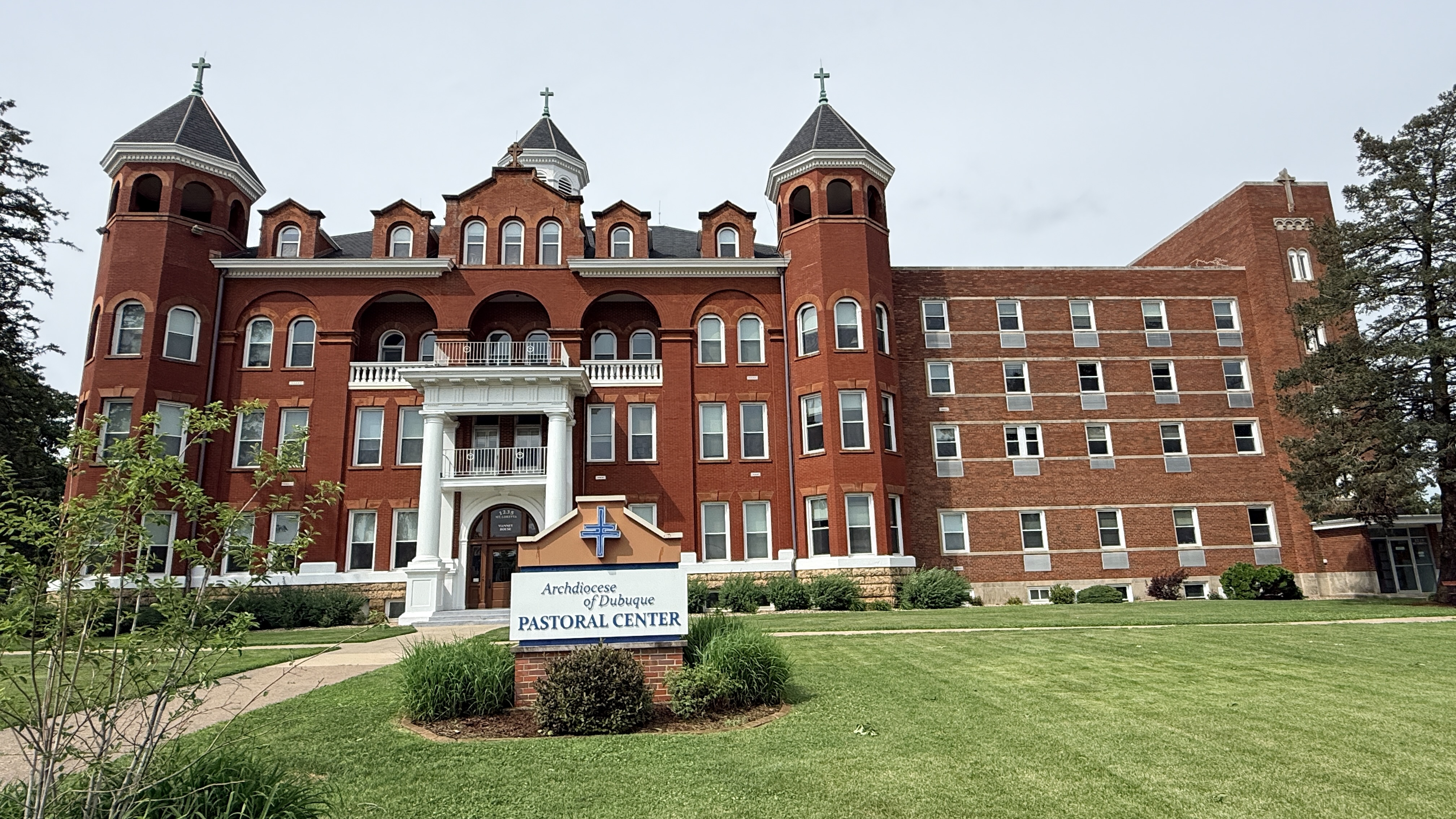
Archdiocesan Pastoral Center

On June 15, 1944, Pope Pius XII appointed Bishop Henry Rohlman from Davenport as coadjutor archbishop of Dubuque. When Beckman retired in 1947, Rohlman automatically succeeded him as bishop of Dubuque.

While Rohlman was archbishop, Christ the King Chapel was constructed at Loras College, St. Mary's Home for Children was built in Dubuque, and the number of priests in the archdiocese rose from 290 to 345. Rohlman, along with the other bishops in Iowa, re-established the Mount St. Bernard Seminary for the education of new priests in the province. The archdiocese built a $2.5 million home for the seminary in Dubuque.

On October 15, 1949, Pius XII named Bishop Leo Binz from the Diocese of Winona as coadjutor archbishop in Dubuque. When Rohlman retired on December 2, 1954, Binz replaced him. During his seven years as archbishop, Binz helped develop Catholic high schools in the archdiocese. He also established the North American Martyrs Retreat House in Cedar Falls, and expanded the archdiocesan branch of Catholic Charities. On December 16, 1961, Pope John XXIII named Binz as archbishop of Saint Paul.

John XXIII nominated Bishop James Byrne from the Diocese of Boise to be the next archbishop of Dubuque on March 7, 1962. After the Second Vatican Council (1962 to 1965), Byrne implemented many of its reforms in the archdiocese, including a priests senate, a clergy advisory board, and an advisory board for the assignment of priests to parishes. In 1964, the Trappist sisters founded Our Lady of the Mississippi Abbey in Dubuque.

=== 1983 to present ===
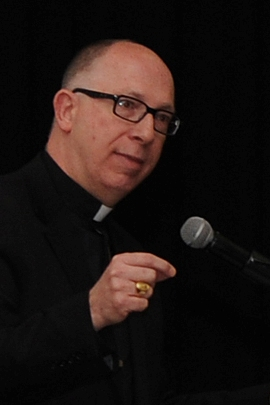
Archbishop Jackels

Byrne retired from office on August 23, 1983. On December 20, 1983, Pope John Paul II appointed Bishop Daniel Kucera of the Diocese of Salina as the eighth archbishop of Dubuque.

In 1987, Kucera launched a plan that divided the archdiocese into three regions with a resident bishop in each. The Dubuque Region was served by retired Archbishop James Byrne and Archbishop Kucera; the Cedar Rapids Region by Bishop Francis Dunn, and Waterloo Region by William Franklin who was consecrated as a bishop in April 1987. However, Bishop Kucera eventually dropped the plan after the death of Bishop Dunn in 1989 and Bishop Franklin's nomination as the head of the Diocese of Davenport.

In 1986 the archdiocese celebrated the 150th anniversary of its founding. John Paul II named Bishop Jerome Hanus from the Diocese of St. Cloud as coadjutor archbishop in Dubuque on August 23, 1994. When retired on October 16, 1995, Hanus became archbishop.

As archbishop, Hanus implemented a strategic planning process throughout the archdiocese. He sent videotaped messages to all the parishes to be played at mass. Parishioners were given opportunities to respond and express their own views. Hanus then issued a vision statement, which spelled out his plans for the archdiocese. These plans included an increased role for the laity in leadership roles, necessitated by the priest shortage and the changing demographics of the archdiocese. These conditions also forced Hanus to combine and close a number of parishes.

After Hanus retired in 2013, Pope Francis on April 8, 2013, appointed Bishop Michael Jackels from the Diocese of Wichita as the next archbishop of Dubuque. On April 24, 2023, a cardiac condition forced Jackels to immediately retire as archbishop. Francis appointed Bishop Emeritus Richard Pates from Des Moines to serve as the apostolic administrator, running the archdiocese.

On July 26, 2023, Francis appointed Thomas Zinkula from Davenport as the eleventh archbishop of Dubuque. As of October 2024, he is the current archbishop of Dubuque. In November 2025, the archdiocese announced another restructuring plan called "Journey in Faith". The archdiocese noted that mass attendance was down 46% since 2006, with marriages down 57%. The initial part of the plan centered on reducing the number of churches offering Sunday masses.

== Early parishes ==
=== St. John the Baptist ===
Founded in 1874, St. John the Baptist parish is now part of the St. Elizabeth Pastorate, a cluster of parishes in northern Dubuque County, Iowa. In July 1874, Bishop Hennessy granted Catholic residents of Centralia permission to build St. John the Baptist Church. They laid the cornerstone in the fall of 1874 and George W. Heer became the first pastor in 1875. When the railroad came through neighboring Peosta, Archbishop John Keane decided in 1923 to move St. John there. During the winter, parishioners would travel to services by horse-drawn bobsled. In 1989, the parish dedicated a new church building.

=== St. Francis ===
Founded in 1891, St. Francis Parish in Balltown is now part of the St. John Baptist de La Salle Pastorate. The parish traces its history to 1858 when area Catholics petitioned Bishop Loras to establish a parish for them. Loras visited Balltown and offered mass in a log cabin. In 1891, parishioners built a brick building to house a school and a convent. and established a cemetery. The school opened in September 1891 with 45 children. The priest celebrated mass in a small sanctuary adjoining the schoolroom.

In 1892, the parish laid the cornerstone for the St. Francis Church building. On August 27, 1976, the church was destroyed by fire. The parish built a new church, demolishing the old convent building to make room for it.

=== Ss. Peter and Paul ===
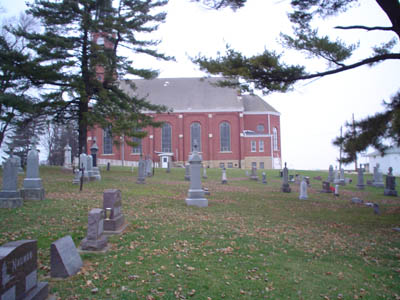
Ss. Peter and Paul Church, Sherrill, Iowa

Founded in 1852, Ss. Peter and Paul Parish in Sherrill, Iowa, is now part of the St. John Baptist de La Salle Pastorate.

Before the parish was founded, its Catholics had to travel 15 miles by ox-team to Dubuque to attend mass. With the influx of German Catholic immigrants to the area, Bishop Loras established the St. William Parish in Sherrill. It was renamed Ss. Peter and Paul Parish in 1860. In 1889, the parish replaced its original wood church with the current brick and stone Romanesque Revival structure. During the 1970s, the parish removed the original carved wood altars from the church and painted over its 19th-century wood trim.

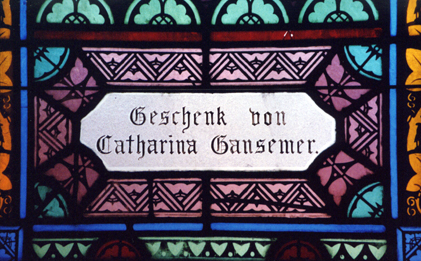
Stained glass panel at Ss Peter and Paul Church. Geschenk von means "gift of". Catharina Gansemer was the donor.

For over 100 years, the Franciscan Sisters of Perpetual Adoration (FSPA) of La Crosse, Wisconsin, operated the parish school. The school is now consolidated in Sherrill with the parish school from Balltown.

==== Others ====
Other early parishes in the diocese include St. Mary's, Sacred Heart, and Holy Ghost.

== Bishops ==
=== Bishops of Dubuque ===
1. Mathias Loras (1837–1858)
2. Clement Smyth, OCSO (1858–1865)
3. John Hennessy (1866–1893), elevated to Archbishop

=== Archbishops of Dubuque ===
1. John Hennessy (1893–1900)
2. John Keane (1900–1911)
3. James Keane (1911–1929)
4. Francis Beckman (1930–1946)
5. Henry Rohlman (1946–1954; Coadjutor 1944–1946)
6. Leo Binz (1954–1961), appointed Archbishop of Saint Paul and Minneapolis
7. James Byrne (1962–1983)
8. Daniel Kucera, OSB (1983–1995)
9. Jerome Hanus, OSB (1995–2013; Coadjutor 1994–1995)
10. Michael Owen Jackels (2013–2023)
11. Thomas Robert Zinkula (2023–present)

=== Auxiliary bishops ===
- Edward Aloysius Fitzgerald (1946–1949), appointed Bishop of Winona
- Loras Thomas Lane (1951–1956), appointed Bishop of Rockford
- George Biskup (1957–1965), appointed Bishop of Des Moines and later Archbishop of Indianapolis
- Loras Joseph Watters (1965–1969), appointed Bishop of Winona
- Francis John Dunn (1969–1989)
- William Edwin Franklin (1987–1993), appointed Bishop of Davenport

=== Other diocesan priests who became bishops ===
- Joseph Crétin, appointed Bishop of Saint Paul in 1850
- Jean-Antoine-Marie Pelamourgues, appointed Bishop of Saint Paul in 1858; did not take effect
- Thomas Mathias Lenihan, appointed Bishop of Cheyenne in 1896
- Mathias Clement Lenihan, appointed Bishop of Great Falls in 1904
- John Patrick Carroll, appointed Bishop of Helena in 1904 (he was born in Dubuque, but was a priest of Cleveland before he became a bishop)
- Daniel Mary Gorman, appointed Bishop of Boise in 1918
- Thomas William Drumm, appointed Bishop of Des Moines in 1919
- Edward Howard, appointed Auxiliary Bishop of Davenport in 1923 and later Archbishop of Oregon City
- Louis Benedict Kucera, appointed Bishop of Lincoln in 1930
- Joseph Clement Willging, appointed Bishop of Pueblo in 1941
- James Vincent Casey, appointed Auxiliary Bishop of Lincoln in 1957
- Raymond Philip Etteldorf, appointed Apostolic Delegate to New Zealand in 1968 and later an official of the (Vatican) Secretariat of State
- Justin Albert Driscoll, appointed Bishop of Fargo in 1970
- Thomas Robert Zinkula, appointed Bishop of Davenport in 2017 and later Archbishop of Dubuque.
- William Michael Joensen, appointed Bishop of Des Moines in 2019
- Scott E. Bullock, appointed Bishop of Rapid City in 2024

== Notable priests ==
- William Menster served as chaplain on US Navy Admiral Richard E. Byrd's fourth expedition to Antarctica in 1946. Menster became the first priest to set foot on the continent.
- US Navy Chaplain Aloysius Schmitt posthumously received the Navy and Marine Corps Medal and the Silver Star for his heroic service in Pearl Harbor, Hawaii, during the December 7, 1941 attack. With only a small porthole available for escape, Schmitt insisted on staying behind to help other sailors escape. He was the first American chaplain to die in World War II.

== Education ==
In the Archdiocese of Dubuque, the Catholic schools are all part of the Holy Family system. The archdiocese has three Catholic colleges: Loras College and Clarke University in Dubuque and Mount Mercy University in Cedar Rapids.

== Sexual abuse crisis ==
A large settlement was paid to victims by Archbishop Jerome Hanus in 2006.

== Sources ==
- Hoffman, Mathias M., Centennial History of the Archdiocese of Dubuque, Columbia College Press, Dubuque, Iowa, 1938.
