= James Vincent Casey =

American prelate (1914–1986)

His Excellency, The Most Reverend James Vincent Casey
- Archbishop of Denver; Titular Bishop of Citium
- See: Archdiocese of Denver
- Installed: February 18, 1967
- Term ended: March 14, 1986
- Predecessor: Urban John Vehr
- Successor: James Stafford
- Other posts: Auxiliary Bishop of Lincoln (1957); Bishop of Lincoln (1957–1967)

Orders
- Ordination: December 8, 1939
- Consecration: April 24, 1957 by Amleto Giovanni Cardinal Cicognani

Personal details
- Born: September 22, 1914 Osage, Iowa, US
- Died: March 14, 1986 (aged 71) Denver, Colorado, US
- Denomination: Roman Catholic Church
- Education: Loras College; Pontifical Gregorian University
- Motto: Nisi dominus (Unless the Lord)
- Coat of arms

James Vincent Casey (September 22, 1914 – March 14, 1986) was an American prelate of the Roman Catholic Church. He served as bishop of Lincoln, in Nebraska (1957–1967) and archbishop of Denver in Colorado (1967–1986).

== Biography ==
=== Early life and education ===
The youngest of two children, James Casey was born on September 22, 1914, in Osage, Iowa, to James Gordon Casey and Nina (née Nims) Casey. His father was a Democratic Party member of the Iowa House of Representatives from 1933 to 1935.

James Casey the younger attended Osage High School, where he was class president and captain of the football team. He then enrolled at Loras College in Dubuque, obtaining a Bachelor of Arts degree in 1936. The archdiocese then sent Casey to Rome to reside at the Pontifical North American College while attending classes at the Pontifical Gregorian University.

=== Priesthood ===
Casey was ordained to the priesthood for the Archdiocese of Dubuque in Rome by Bishop Ralph Leo Hayes on December 8, 1939. After his ordination, the archdiocese assigned Casey in 1940 as curate at St. John Parish in Independence, Iowa. During this period he also taught at the Catholic high school in Independence and coached boys' and girls' basketball.

In 1944, Casey enlisted as a chaplain in the United States Navy Chaplain Corps during World War II. He was embedded with US Marine Corps units in the South Pacific Theater, reaching the rank of lieutenant. After his discharge from the Navy in 1946, Casey moved to Washington D.C. to study canon law at the Catholic University of America. He earned a doctorate in canon law in 1949 with a thesis entitled "A Study of Canon 2222, Paragraph One". That same year Archbishop Henry Rohlman appointed Casey as his private secretary.

The Vatican raised Casey to the rank of papal chamberlain in 1952 and domestic prelate in 1954. He also served as moderator of the Catholic Lawyers Guild (1954–1957), director of the archdiocesan Family Life Bureau (1955–1957), and president of the Canon Law Society of America in Washington (1956–1957).

=== Auxiliary Bishop and Bishop of Lincoln ===
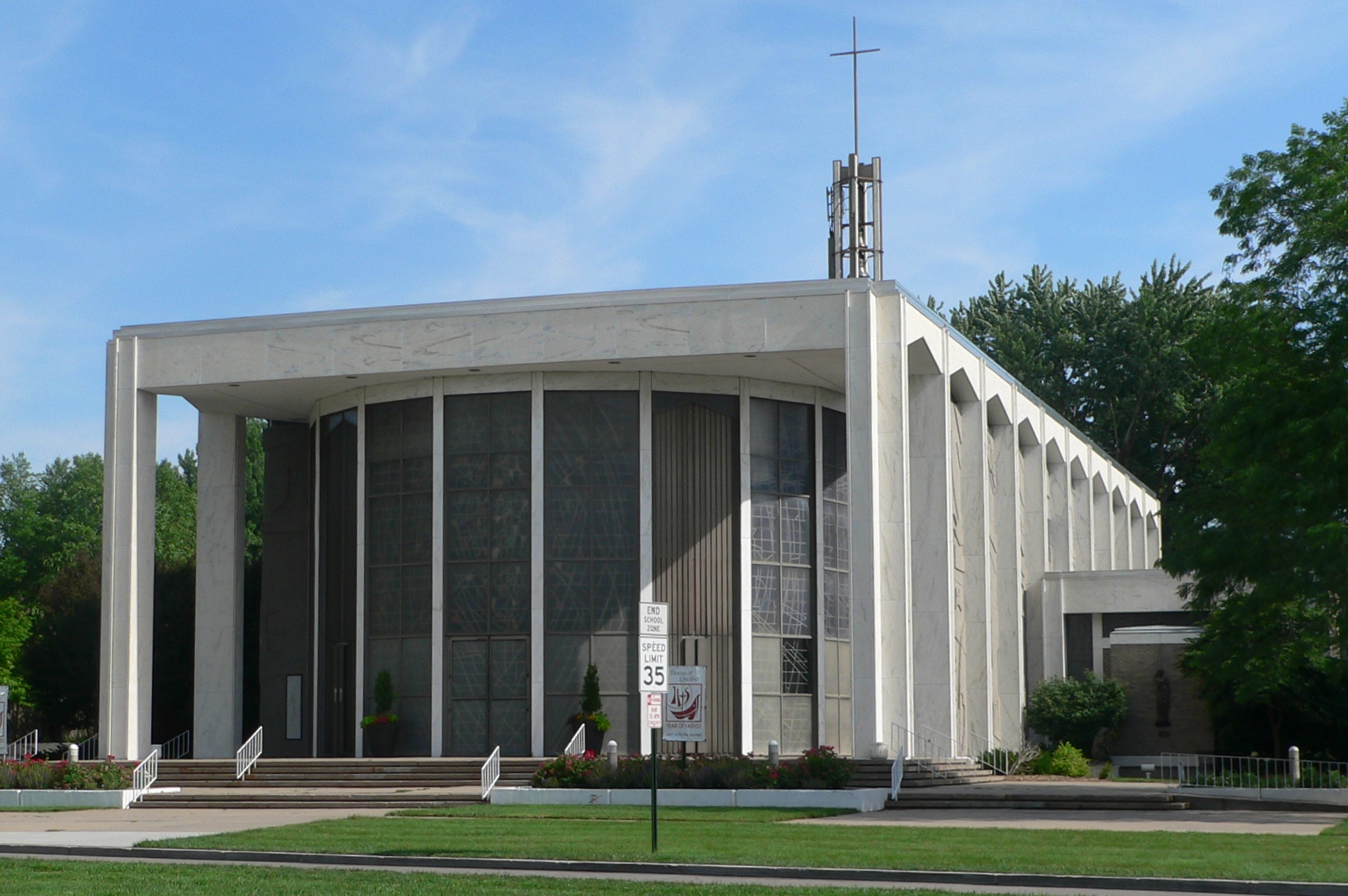
Cathedral of the Risen Christ, Lincoln, Nebraska (2013)

On April 5, 1957, Casey was appointed as an auxiliary bishop of Lincoln and titular bishop of Citium by Pope Pius XII. He received his episcopal consecration at Saint Raphael's Cathedral in Dubuque on April 24, 1957, from Archbishop Amleto Cicognani, with Archbishop Leo Binz and Bishop Loras Lane serving as co-consecrators.

Following the death of Bishop Louis Kucera in May 1957, Casey was named the sixth bishop of Lincoln by Pius XII on June 14, 1957. During his nine-year-long tenure, Kucera established a chancery building, a school for special needs children, a retreat house, several high schools and grade schools, and a Newman Center.

Casey's most prominent accomplishment was the erection of the Cathedral of the Risen Christ in Lincoln; he broke ground for the new cathedral in June 1963 and later dedicated it in August 1965. The Southern Nebraska Register declared that Casey "accomplished more for the Diocese of Lincoln in 10 years than any other comparable period in our history." Between 1962 and 1965, he attended all four sessions of the Second Vatican Council in Rome, which he described as "a revolution."

=== Archbishop of Denver ===
On February 18, 1967, Casey was appointed the second archbishop of Denver by Pope Paul VI. Soon after arriving in Denver, he earmarked $1 million in archdiocesan funds on efforts to help the poor. Among these efforts was the Samaritan House Homeless Shelter in Denver.; He created the archdiocesan Office of Hispanic Concerns in 1968, later raising it to the vicariate level in 1981.

An opponent of American participation in the Vietnam War, Casey encouraged US President Richard Nixon to "set a definite date for the withdrawal of our American military personnel from Vietnam at the earliest possible moment." In 1972, Casey moved out of the episcopal mansion in Cheesman Park in Denver and into a penthouse at the Park Lane Apartments in Washington Park. He gave greater power to laity and nuns, and was forced to close or consolidate several Catholic schools. He joined the Colorado Council of Churches, and allowed Catholics to participate in the crusades of the evangelist Billy Graham. During his 19-year-long tenure, Casey dedicated a total of twenty-four parishes. He also increased the number of priests from 327 to 356, and the number of Catholics from 261,844 to 330,270.

=== Death and legacy ===
While playing golf in October 1984, Casey collapsed from a ruptured artery in his abdomen. He suffered several setbacks during a long recovery, and delegated the administration of the archdiocese to his vicar general. On March 1, 1986, Casey was stricken with a cerebral aneurysm at his residence and then taken unconscious to St. Joseph Hospital in Denver. He underwent surgery the next day to remove a blood clot from his brain. Never regaining consciousness, James Casey died on March 14, 1986, at age 71.

Following his death, Colorado Governor Richard Lamm declared, "[Casey] didn't just talk about the relevance of religious belief, he lived it."

Catholic Church titles
Preceded by Louis Benedict Kucera	Bishop of Lincoln; 1957–1967	Succeeded by Glennon Patrick Flavin
Preceded by Urban John Vehr	Archbishop of Denver; 1967–1986	Succeeded by James Stafford
