= Ambrose Burke =

American Roman Catholic priest and president of Saint Ambrose College, Iowa (1895–1998)

Ambrose J. Burke
- Ambrose Burke, date unknown
- Born: November 27, 1895; Sigourney, Iowa, United States
- Died: October 6, 1998 (aged 102); Clinton, Iowa, United States
- Known for: 8th President of Saint Ambrose University

Monsignor Ambrose J. Burke (November 27, 1895 – October 6, 1998) was an English professor and Catholic priest who served as the eighth president of Saint Ambrose University (then Saint Ambrose College) from 1940 through 1956. A native of Iowa, he attended the college's high school program, and then the college itself, but was expelled from the seminary for a year and a half by the school's administrator for planning an evening of carousing. He eventually acquired a master's degree and a doctorate in English from Yale University and returned to St. Ambrose in 1921 as an instructor. He was appointed the school's president in 1940 and served for sixteen years, then the longest tenure of any St. Ambrose president. He worked as a pastor and a chaplain for many decades after and remained active until shortly before his death in October 1998, at the age of 102.

== Early life ==
Burke was born November 27, 1895, in Sigourney, Iowa. At the age of 14 he attended St. Ambrose Academy in Davenport, Iowa, which was then the high school program for Saint Ambrose University (then known as Saint Ambrose College) and has now been merged into Assumption High School. He then moved on to St. Ambrose College, but was expelled in his second year when his plans to go carousing were discovered by the school authorities. He was not permitted to return to the seminary for a year and a half. He was eventually ordained a priest of the Catholic Church in 1921 in Baltimore, Maryland.

== Career at St. Ambrose ==
Burke had also obtained his master's degree and doctorate in English studies from Yale University and returned to St. Ambrose in 1921 as an English instructor, eventually becoming the head of the department. In 1940 he was appointed to the presidency of the college by Henry Rohlman, then Bishop of the Diocese of Davenport, replacing Carl Meinberg after the latter's retirement. Although he claimed original that he did not want the job, as he would have preferred to continue teaching instead, he served in this capacity for sixteen years, the longest tenure in the post until Edward Rogalski's. During his presidency a library, an administrative building (McMullen Hall), and the Christ the King Chapel were constructed and enrollment reached a then-peak of over 1500 students. During this time he also hosted a three-part series on NBC's Catholic Hour entitled Sainthood, the Universal Vocation. He left the school in 1956 after accepting a position as pastor of St. Mary's Catholic Church.

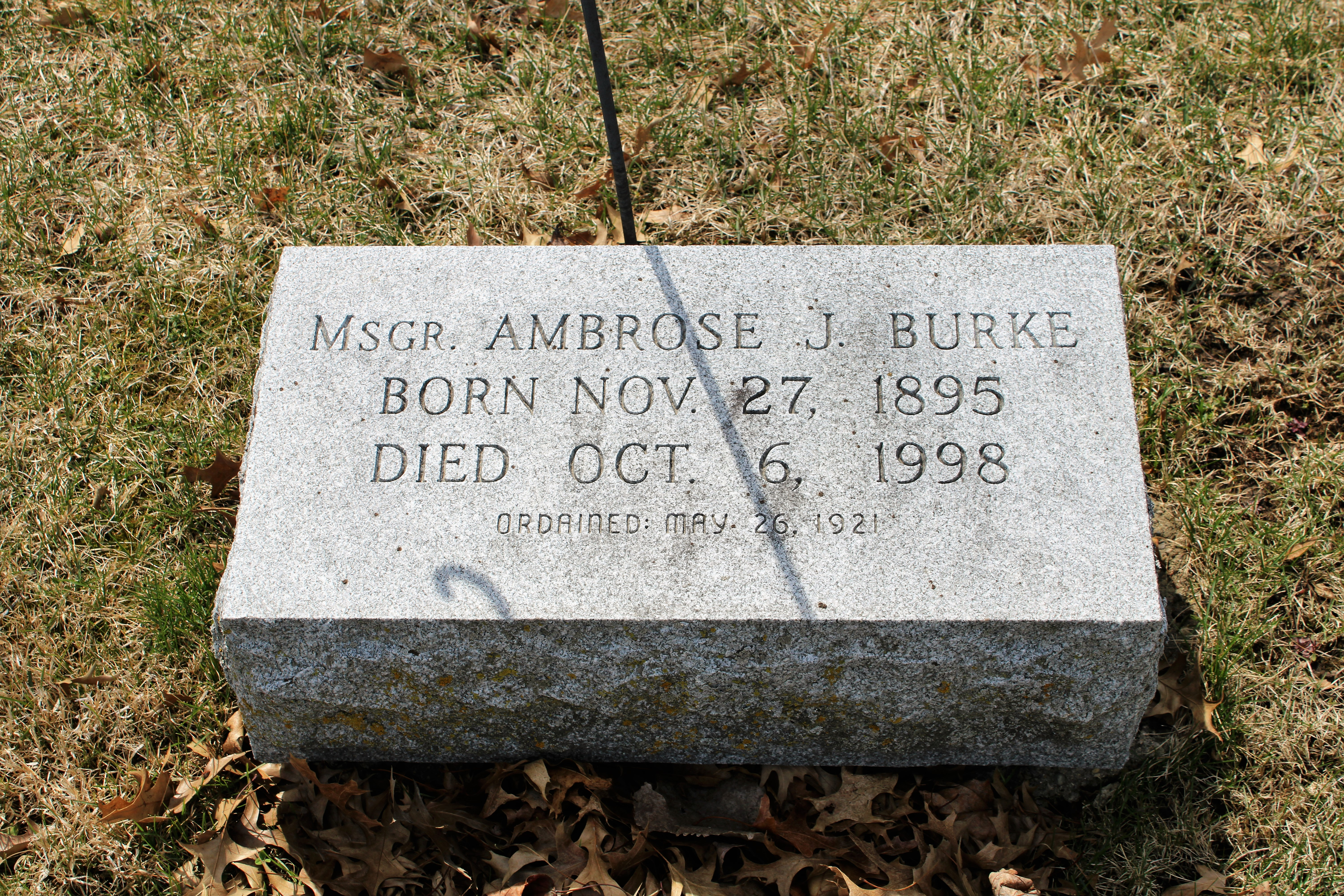
Msgr. Burke's grave in Mount Calvary Cemetery

== Later life ==
Burke remained at St. Mary's until 1973, when he reached his mandatory retirement, and then served for over a decade as chaplain at the city's Mercy Hospital. Although he was officially retired by 1986, he remained active into his late 90s and continued to attend conventions on Catholicism in Clinton. For his 100th birthday he celebrated a public mass in Clinton and attended a party the following day at St. Ambrose. He died on October 6, 1998, at the age of 102, in Clinton and was buried in Mount Calvary Cemetery in Davenport.

Academic offices
Preceded by Carl Meinberg	President of St. Ambrose University; 1940–1956	Succeeded by William J. Collins
