= Fabian Bruskewitz =

American Catholic bishop (born 1935)

His Excellency. The Most Reverend Fabian Wendelin Bruskewitz
- Bishop Emeritus of Lincoln
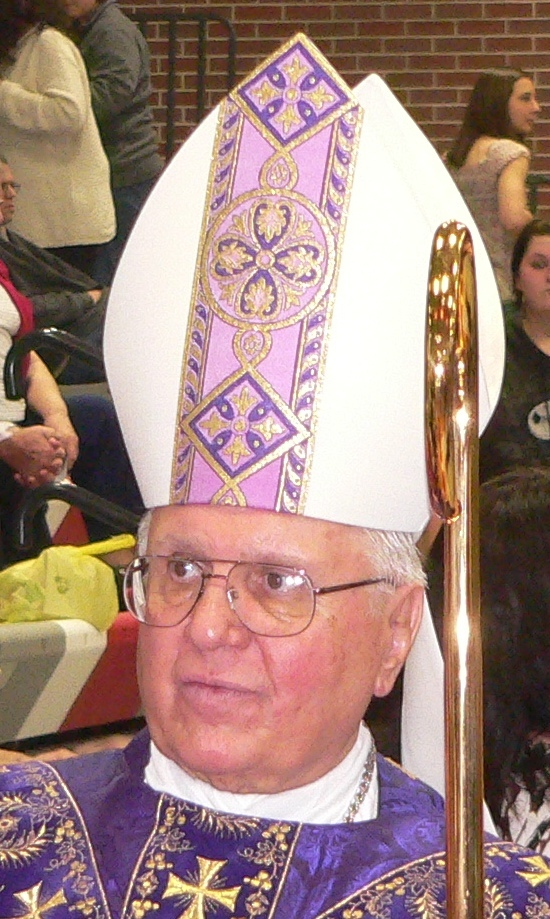
- Bruskewitz in 2011
- Diocese: Lincoln
- Appointed: March 24, 1992
- Installed: May 13, 1992
- Retired: September 14, 2012
- Predecessor: Glennon Flavin
- Successor: James D. Conley

Orders
- Ordination: July 17, 1960 by Luigi Traglia
- Consecration: May 13, 1992 by Daniel E. Sheehan, Leo Joseph Brust, and Glennon Patrick Flavin

Personal details
- Born: September 6, 1935 (age 91) Milwaukee, Wisconsin, U.S.
- Denomination: Roman Catholic
- Education: Pontifical North American College; Pontifical Gregorian University
- Motto: Sub tuum praesidium (Under thy protection)

Styles of Fabian Wendelin Bruskewitz
- Reference style: His Excellency; The Most Reverend
- Spoken style: Your Excellency
- Religious style: Bishop

Ordination history of Fabian Bruskewitz
History
Diaconal ordination
- Ordained by: Martin O'Connor
- Date: May 8, 1960
Priestly ordination
- Ordained by: Luigi Traglia
- Date: July 17, 1960
- Place: Basilica dei Santi Apostoli, Rome, Italy
Episcopal consecration
- Principal consecrator: Daniel Eugene Sheehan
- Co-consecrators: Leo Brust, Glennon Flavin
- Date: May 13, 1992
- Place: Cathedral of the Risen Christ, Lincoln, Nebraska

Fabian Wendelin Bruskewitz (born September 6, 1935) is an American prelate of the Roman Catholic Church who served as bishop of the Diocese of Lincoln in Nebraska, from 1992 to 2012.

== Biography ==
=== Early life ===
Fabian Wendelin Bruskewitz was born on September 6, 1935, in Milwaukee, Wisconsin. He attended a local parochial school before studying at St. Lawrence Seminary High School in Mount Calvary, Wisconsin and at St. Francis Seminary in St. Francis, Wisconsin. He went to Rome to reside at the Pontifical North American College while studying at the Pontifical Gregorian University.

=== Priesthood ===
Bruskewitz was ordained to the priesthood for the Archdiocese of Milwaukee by Cardinal Luigi Traglia on July 17, 1960, at the Basilica dei Santi Apostoli in Rome. Upon his return to the United States, the archdiocese assigned Bruskewitz as an assistant pastor in parishes near Milwaukee. He briefly taught at St. Francis Seminary.

During the mid-1950s, Bruskewitz returned to Rome for an assignment in the Congregation for Catholic Education in the Roman Curia, where he worked for eleven years. He received a Doctor of Dogmatic Theology degree from the Gregorian in 1969. He was raised by the Vatican to the rank of chaplain of his holiness in 1976, becoming an honorary prelate in 1980. That same year, Bruskewitz returned to Wisconsin became pastor of St. Bernard Parish in Wauwatosa.

=== Bishop of Lincoln ===
On March 24, 1992, Pope John Paul II appointed Bruskewitz as the eighth bishop of Lincoln. He received his episcopal consecration on May 13, 1992, from Archbishop Daniel E. Sheehan, with Bishops Glennon Flavin and Leo Brust serving as co-consecrators, at the Cathedral of the Risen Christ in Lincoln.

In 1998, according to a 2021 investigation by Nebraska Attorney General Doug Peterson, Bruskewitz met with Monsignor Leonard Kalin, the vocations director at the Newman Center at the University of Nebraska. The diocese had been receiving complaints of sexual harassment and assault by Kalin from seminarians and undergraduates at the university. In the meeting Kalin admitted having had 50 sexual encounters with other males. In response, Bruskewitz banned Kalin from dealing with anyone under age 40, but did not report him to authorities or suspend his ministerial privileges. A later note in Kalin's personal file stated that Kalin was not following the ban.

A 2005 report by the Catholic News Agency stated that the diocese had the highest priest-to-Catholic ratio in the United States. The article suggested that this was due to Bruskewitz' emphasis on orthodoxy, along with having a seminary in the diocese. According to one opinion writer, "Fidelity to the magisterium and traditional spirituality are strikingly manifest." Bruskewitz noted that

"The orthodoxy, conservatism, and enthusiasm of the clergy, both young and old, bear witness to the splendor of the Catholic priesthood in southern Nebraska."

Under Bruskewitz, the diocese was the only diocese in the United States where female altar servers were not allowed diocese-wide. Bruskewitz published a book entitled Bishop Fabian Bruskewitz: A Shepherd Speaks.

=== Retirement ===
On September 6, 2010, Bruskewitz submitted his letter of resignation to Pope Benedict XVI, having reached the mandatory retirement age of 75 for bishops. Benedict XVI accepted his resignation on September 14, 2012, and appointed Bishop James D. Conley as his successor.

In 2021, the Nebraska Attorney General report on sexual abuse by priests in Nebraska highlighted several instances in which Bruskewitz failed to follow canon law in handling allegations:

- Reverend John Copenhaver was accused in the early 1990s and 2001 of inappropriate behavior with a minor, but Bruskewitz did not suspend him or investigate the claim. In 2002, after another incident, Bruskewitz ordered Copenhaver to undergo counseling, but remain in his parish position. In 2021, Bruskewitz finally told Copenhaver to retire from ministry.
- Reverend James Benton was accused in 1997 of sexually touching a minor in the 1980s. The diocese did not investigate Benton, even after the victim met with Bruskewitz in 2002. Benton continued in pastoral assignments until another allegation was made against him in 2017.
- Reverend Thomas Dunavan was accused in 2001 by an 18-year-old woman of sexually groping her. She said that the diocese coerced her to recant her initial allegation two weeks later. The woman subsequently filed a sexual assault complaint against Dunavan with the local police. The diocese never investigated her claims.

== Views ==
=== Orthodox Catholic Views on Sexuality ===
In 1997, Bruskewitz publicly opposed attempts from other bishops within the United States Conference of Catholic Bishops (USCCB) to reach out to parents trying to cope with LGBTQ children through the pastoral document, "All our children". He called the document a “...calamity and frightening disaster...” and advised Catholics to ignore or oppose it.

Bruskewitz believes that most sexual abuse by Catholic priests is against adolescent boys and is rooted in "society's acceptance of homosexuality". He has emphasized therefore that bishops should never accept gay men into the priesthood because it encourages temptation as "priests are regularly in close proximity with children and young men". He attempted to persuade the USCCB to commission a study to examine potential links between sexual abuse by priests and allowing gay men into Catholic seminaries. The USCCB instead commissioned John Jay College of Criminal Justice in New York City to study sexual abuse by priests. Their report, The Causes and Context of Sexual Abuse of Minors by Catholic Priests in the United States, 1950-2010, was published in 2011.

In 2016, Bruskewitz described the practice of anal sex by gay men as a degeneration and a perversion that is "repulsive to normal human beings".

=== National guidelines on sex-abuse programs ===
Bruskewitz was occasionally at odds with the USCCB. For example, he rejected an audit by the USCCB National Review Board of his plans to implement national guidelines on sex-abuse programs, making reference to both the Review Board and Patricia O'Donnell Ewers, the former president of Pace University:

Some woman named Patricia O'Donnell Ewers, who is the chair of something called 'A National Review Board for the Protection of Children and Young People,' has said that her board 'calls for strong fraternal correction of the Diocese of Lincoln.' The Diocese of Lincoln has nothing to be corrected for, since the Diocese of Lincoln is and has always been in full compliance with all laws of the Catholic Church and with all civil laws...The Diocese of Lincoln does not see any reason for the existence of Ewers and her organization.

The issue brought the diocese to national attention. Bruskewitz was the only one of 195 American bishops who refused to sign the USCCB Charter for the Protection of Children and Young People. He suggested that the sexual abuse crisis in the Catholic church was linked to clerical dissent from Catholic sexual ethics more broadly dating to dissent from the papal encyclical, Humanae Vitae", which reaffirmed Catholic teaching on artificial birth control.

=== 1996 decree of automatic excommunication ===
Bruskewitz gained national attention in 1996 for decreeing automatic excommunication on Catholics in the diocese for membership in the following groups. In his statement, he asserted "Membership in these organizations or groups is always perilous to the Catholic Faith and most often is totally incompatible with the Catholic Faith."

- Call to Action, with its Nebraska affiliate Call to Action Nebraska. The group lobbies to change Catholic teaching on priestly celibacy, female priests, the selection process for bishops and popes, and artificial contraception.
- Planned Parenthood and Catholics for a Free Choice, for activities giving support for abortion
- The Hemlock Society, for its advocacy of euthanasia
- The Society of Saint Pius X and its St. Michael the Archangel Chapel, for "fraudulently advertising themselves in Lincoln as 'in full union with Rome,' causing confusion, ambiguity, and uncertainty on the part of many of the faithful in Lincoln..."
- Freemasonry and its affiliate organizations (Job's Daughters, DeMolay, Eastern Star and Rainbow Girls), for beliefs and practices considered incompatible with Catholicism.

Call to Action appealed to Rome against Bruskewitz's decree, but in 2006 the Congregation for Bishops upheld his action. Bruskewitz wrote in a letter to Call to Action at the time of the excommunications that "the difference between a Protestant and a dissenting Catholic is that a Protestant has integrity." Regis Scanlon considered that the controversy created by Bruskewitz's decree may have been one of the factors that led Cardinal Joseph Bernardin to initiate without success his "Catholic Common Ground Project" to bring American Catholic factions together, based on the belief, which Scanlon decried, that "limited and occasional dissent" from the magisterium of the Church was "legitimate".

=== Abortion and capital punishment ===
In 2004, Bruskewitz stated that he would deny the eucharist to Catholic politicians who support abortion rights, including 2004 US presidential candidate and then US Senator John Kerry. In 2005, Bruskewitz voted to approve a USCCB resolution calling for an end to the practice of capital punishment. However, he said, "One can disagree with the bishops' teaching about the death penalty and still present himself for holy Communion, but one cannot disagree with a teaching about abortion and euthanasia and present himself for holy Communion."

=== Tridentine Mass ===
Bruskewitz continued to revere the Tridentine Mass after the Novus Ordo Mass had become the ordinary form of the mass throughout the Catholic church. Before the release of the apostolic letter Summorum Pontificum by Benedict XVI in 2007, Bruskewitz was identified in The Wanderer as one of the few U.S. bishops "...who have been generous in the Ecclesia Dei indult application, as requested and emphasized repeatedly by the late Pope John Paul II."

=== Yoga ===
In 2015 Bruskewitz issued a public letter urging Catholic women not to engage in yoga. He argued that yoga has its root in Hinduism, and was thus “incompatible to Christianity.”

== Coat of arms ==
Coat of arms of Fabian Bruskewitz
Notes The coat of arms was designed by Paul J. Sullivan of Narragansett, Rhode Island when Bruskewitz became bishop of Lincoln. Adopted 1992 Escutcheon The left side of the shield displays the arms of the Diocese of Lincoln. The right side shows the personal arms of Bruskewitz. The right upper section contains a gyronny of red and silver with a gold plate and a dove. The right lower section is a slight variation of the arms of the Bruskewitz family. The first and fourth quarters have blue crosses. Motto For his motto, Bruskewitz selected the title and first line of an ancient hymn of Gregorian Chant to Mary, mother of Jesus "SUB TUUM PRAESIDIUM" which means "Under thy protection". Symbolism The gyronny is a variation on the arms of the Archdiocese of Milwaukee, where Bruskewitz previously served. The dove honors Saint Fabian, his baptismal patron. The lower portion honors his parents, Wendelin and Frances (Talsky) Bruskewitz.

== See also ==
- Catholic Church hierarchy
- Catholic Church in the United States
- Historical list of the Catholic bishops of the United States
- List of Catholic bishops of the United States
- Lists of patriarchs, archbishops, and bishops

== Episcopal succession ==
Catholic Church titles
Preceded by Glennon Patrick Flavin	Bishop of Lincoln; 1992 - 2012	Succeeded by James D. Conley
