= Ulrich Hauber =

U. A. Hauber
- Born: June 28, 1885; Bavaria, Germany
- Died: July 1, 1956 (aged 71); Davenport, Iowa, USA
- Known for: President of St. Ambrose College, Davenport, Iowa

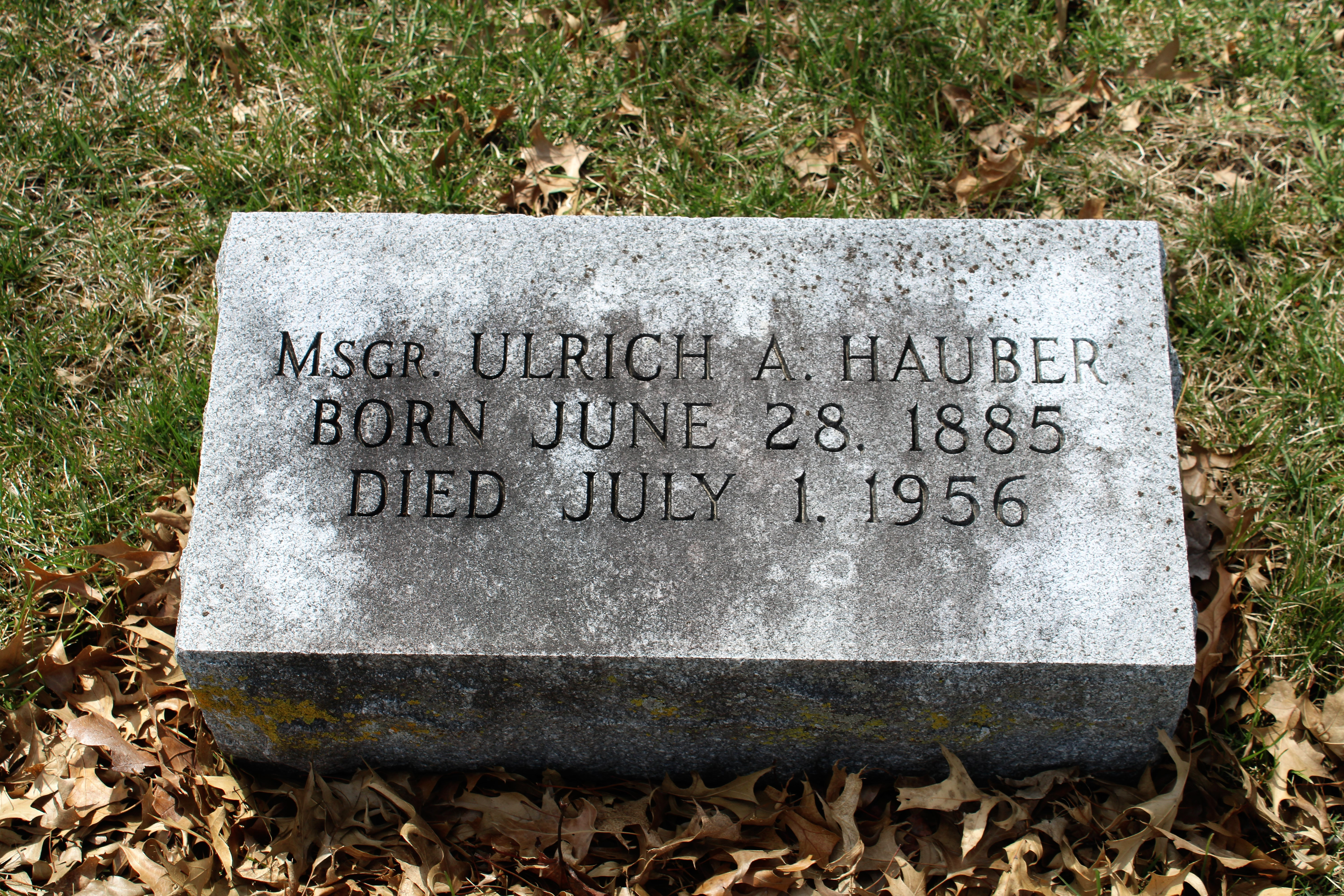
Msgr. Hauber's grave in Mount Calvary Cemetery, Davenport

Ulrich A. Hauber (June 28, 1885 – July 1, 1956) was a Catholic priest from the United States, who served as the fifth president of St. Ambrose College in Davenport, Iowa from 1926 to 1930.

Born June 28, 1885, in Bavaria, Germany, Hauber graduated from St. Ambrose College in 1905 and studied for the priesthood at St. Francis Seminary. He was ordained a priest for the Diocese of Davenport in St. Francis, Wisconsin in 1908, He received a doctorate in biology from the University of Iowa.

Hauber joined the faculty of St. Ambrose College, where he served for 48 years. A nationally known biologist, Hauber was the author of many textbooks, pamphlets and articles. At St. Ambrose College, Hauber was the chairman of the Division of Natural Sciences before becoming the fifth president. In the four years he was president he finished the construction of Davis Hall and built Lewis Halls. Until Davis Hall was built the entire college had been contained in Ambrose Hall. He also improved the academic standards of the college, which was accredited by the North Central Association on March 24, 1927. After his term as president ended he returned to the classroom. In 1937 Pope Pius XI named Hauber a Domestic Prelate upon the nomination of Bishop Henry Rohlman. He also served as chaplain at the Carmelite Monastery in Bettendorf, Iowa. Msgr. Hauber died July 1, 1956, and was the first person to be buried from the Christ the King Chapel.

Academic offices
Preceded by William Hannon	President of St. Ambrose University; 1926–1930	Succeeded by Martin Cone
