= St. Gregory the Great Seminary =

Catholic seminary in Seward, Nebraska

- The coat of arms of the seminary
- Motto: Pastores Dabo Vobis
- Motto in English: I Will Give You Shepherds
- Type: College seminary
- Established: 1998
- Parent institution: Diocese of Lincoln
- Religious affiliation: Catholic Church
- Rector: James Morin
- Location: 800 Fletcher Road, Seward, Nebraska, 68434-8145; 40°52′29″N 97°06′15″W
- Campus: Rural
- Website: www.sggs.edu

St. Gregory the Great Seminary is a Catholic diocesan college seminary in Seward, Nebraska, United States. It opened in 1998 and is operated by the Diocese of Lincoln.

== History ==
Prior to the establishment of St. Gregory the Great Seminary, seminarians for the Diocese of Lincoln, Nebraska were sent to seminaries all around the United States, including Mount St. Mary's in Emmitsburg, Maryland, and St. Charles Borromeo Seminary in Philadelphia. In 1996, Bishop Fabian Bruskewitz established a task force to examine the idea of creating a seminary in the diocese. In 1997, the diocese purchased the former Rivendell Psychiatric Hospital for Juveniles in Seward, Nebraska, for $1.35 million ($2.71 million in 2025); following the purchase, more than $1 million in renovations were done to convert the property.

The seminary opened in August 1998, with 21 seminarians from the Diocese of Lincoln. It was formally dedicated on August 27, in a ceremony attended by 1,200 people. Fr. John Rooney was the first rector. Initially, non-religious academic classes were taken at Concordia University Nebraska, a Lutheran university five minutes from the seminary.

During the Pope John Paul II's visit to the United States in 1999, Bishop Fabian Bruskewitz drove with the cornerstone of the seminary chapel in the trunk of his car to St. Louis, Missouri, to have the pontiff bless it after a Mass at the TWA Dome. Monsignor John Folda became rector of the seminary in 1999, a position he would hold until his appointment as bishop of the Diocese of Fargo in 2013. Renovations completed in 2000 added a Romanesque chapel seating 250 people and a library able to hold 85,000 volumes. The seminary was accredited by the Higher Learning Commission in 2010.

Rev. Jeffrey Eickhoff, who had been serving as a professor and academic dean at the seminary since 2002, was appointed rector of the seminary in 2013.

The seminary underwent a major expansion in 2017, adding fourteen dorm rooms, two classrooms, and a science laboratory. The new wing was blessed by Archbishop Christophe Pierre, apostolic nuncio to the United States, on April 22, 2018.

Rev. Brian Kane became the fourth rector of the institution on June 14, 2021.

== Academics ==
St. Gregory is a college seminary, providing four years of undergraduate philosophical education to those entering seminary directly out of high school, or two years of pre-theology philosophy for those who already have bachelor's degrees.

== Rectors ==
- Fr. John Rooney (1998–1999)
- Msgr. John Folda (1999–2013)
- Fr. Jeffrey R. Eickhoff (2013–2021)
- Fr. Brian P. Kane (2021–2026)
- Fr. James (Jim) Morin (2026–present)

== Sponsoring dioceses ==
As of 2026, the following dioceses and orders send seminarians to St. Gregory:

- Diocese of Colorado Springs
- Diocese of Fargo
- Diocese of Lincoln
- Archdiocese of Omaha
- Diocese of Pueblo
- Diocese of Santa Rosa

== See also ==
- Pope Saint Gregory the Great
