= William Shannahan =

Rt. Rev. Msgr. William P. Shannahan, PA
- Born: February 2, 1870; Wilton, Iowa, USA
- Died: October 22, 1937 (aged 67); Davenport, Iowa, USA
- Known for: President of St. Ambrose College, Davenport, Iowa

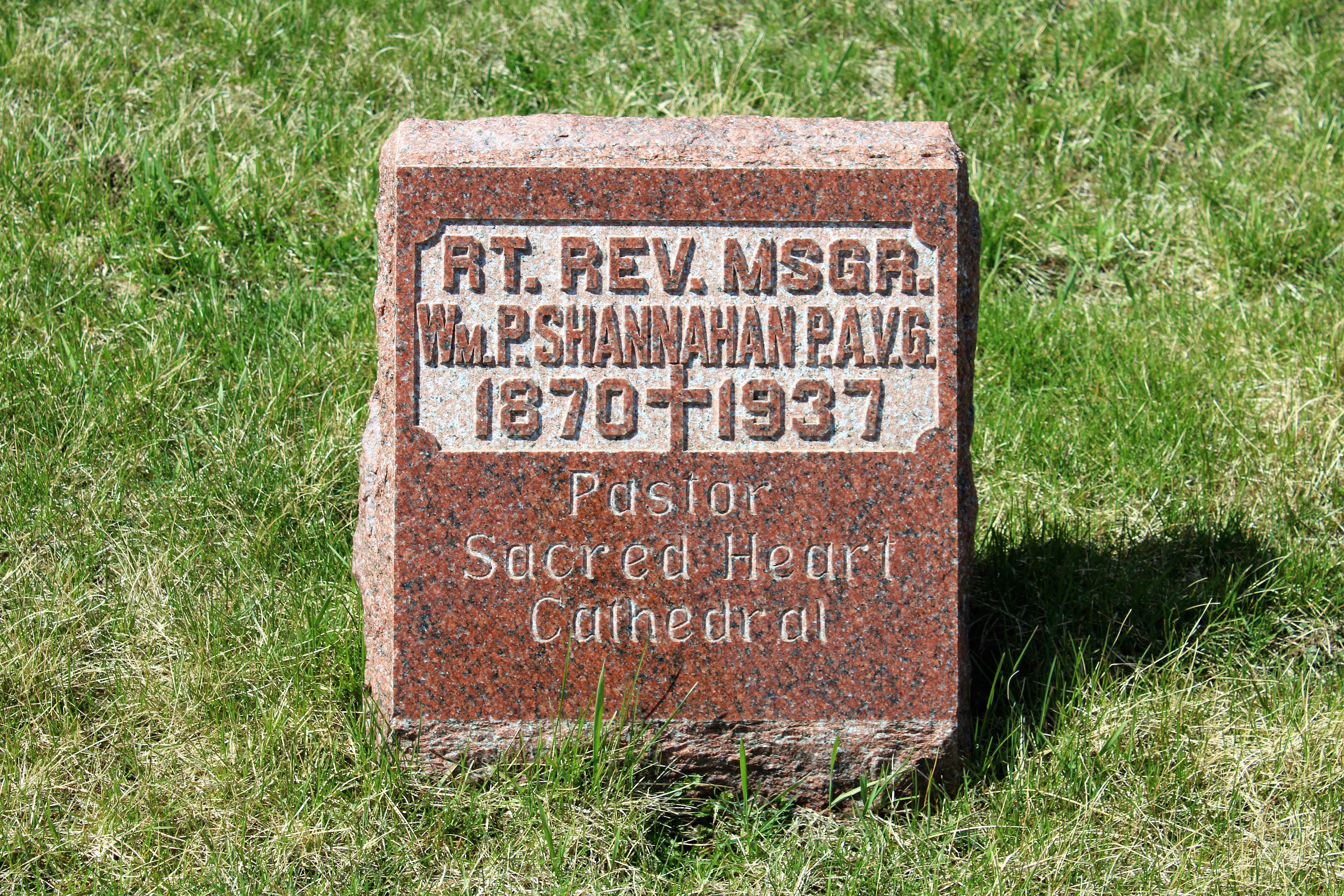
Msgr. Shannahan's grave in Mount Calvary Cemetery

William P. Shannahan (February 2, 1870 – October 22, 1937) was a late 19th and early 20th century Catholic priest in the United States who was the third president of St. Ambrose College in Davenport, Iowa, from 1906 to 1915.

== Biography ==
Shannahann, whose nickname was "Big Bill", was born in Wilton, Iowa, and raised in Williamsburg, Iowa. He was the St. Ambrose football team's first captain, and graduated from the institution in 1896. He studied for the priesthood at St. Paul Seminary and was ordained a priest for the Diocese of Davenport on May 8, 1899, in St. Paul, Minnesota, by Archbishop John Ireland. After ordination he spent a year in graduate studies at The Catholic University of America in Washington, D.C.

Shannahan taught in the philosophy department before taking his role as the president. During his term, the second east wing of Ambrose Hall was built in 1908, which contained an auditorium, classrooms, and living quarters. After leaving St. Ambrose, Shannahan was named pastor at St. Patrick's Church in Iowa City where he served until he was appointed as the rector and pastor of Sacred Heart Cathedral and vicar general of the diocese in 1932.

Bishop Henry Rohlman nominated Shannahan twice for Papal honors; the first time as a Domestic Prelate and the second time as a Protonotary Apostolic. Both honors were bestowed by Pope Pius XI. In the 1930s he worked with Msgrs. Martin Cone and George Giglinger to develop a local radio program on WOC that featured Catholic topics. Msgr. Shannahan died on October 22, 1937, at the age of 67.

Academic offices
| Preceded by John Flannagan | President of St. Ambrose University; 1906–1915 | Succeeded by William Hannon |
