= Carl Meinberg =

American Catholic priest

Rt. Rev. Msgr. Carl H. Meinberg
- Born: January 11, 1889; Keokuk, Iowa, US
- Died: April 15, 1975 (aged 86); Davenport, Iowa, US
- Known for: President of St. Ambrose College, Davenport, Iowa

Carl H. Meinberg (January 11, 1889 – April 15, 1975) was a 20th-century Catholic priest in the United States who served as the seventh president of St. Ambrose College in Davenport, Iowa, from 1937 to 1940. He is included by the Diocese of Davenport on a list of credibly accused abusers for the alleged abuse of at least four minors.

== Biography ==
Meinberg was born on January 11, 1889, in Keokuk, Iowa. He was educated at St. Francis School and St. Peter’s High School, both in Keokuk, and St. Ambrose College. He went on to St. Mary’s Seminary in Baltimore. He was ordained on May 30, 1914, at Sacred Heart Cathedral in Davenport by Bishop James Davis. He holds a Master’s Degree from The Catholic University of America. He also did graduate work at the University of Iowa and the University of Notre Dame.

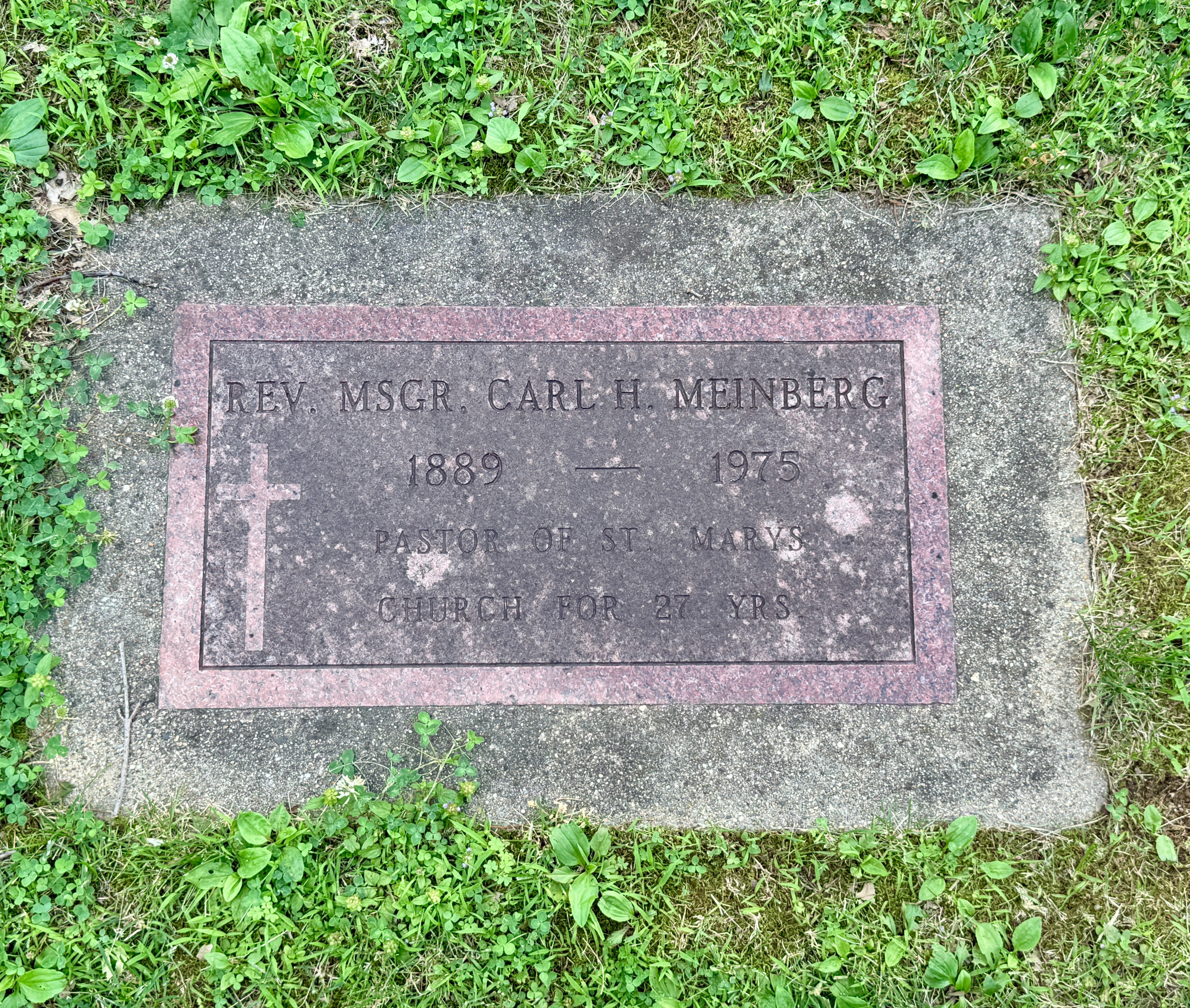
Msgr. Meinberg's grave

He became a member to the faculty at St. Ambrose College after his ordination to the priesthood. In his early years, Meinberg served as the head of the library, and was also the director of the choir and the orchestra. He taught in the departments of religion and Spanish, and eventually became the head of the history department and the campus spiritual director before becoming president. He served as the college president from November 1937 until February 1940. In 1939 Pope Pius XII named Meinberg a Domestic Prelate, upon the nomination of Bishop Henry Rohlman.

After leaving the presidency, Msgr. Meinberg became the pastor of St. Mary’s Church in Iowa City. His predecessor at St. Mary’s was Msgr. A.J. Schulte, the first president of St. Ambrose. During his 27 years as pastor the rectory and convent were renovated, and the church was redecorated. The parish celebrated its centennial in 1941. St. Mary’s High School merged with St. Patrick’s High School, upon the directive of Bishop Ralph L. Hayes, and created Regina High School. He also served as dean of the Iowa City Deanery. Msgr. Meinberg retired in August 1967 to St. Ambrose College. He died there on April 15, 1975, at the age of 86. He had two funerals one in Christ the King Chapel at St. Ambrose and one at St. Mary’s. He was buried in St. Joseph’s Cemetery in Iowa City.

Academic offices
| Preceded by Martin Cone | President of St. Ambrose University; 1937–1940 | Succeeded by Ambrose Burke |
