= William Hannon =

Rt. Rev. Msgr. William L. Hannon
- Born: March 21, 1879; Holbrook, Iowa, USA
- Died: 1950 (aged 70–71); Davenport, Iowa, USA
- Known for: President of St. Ambrose College, Davenport, Iowa

William Hannon (1879–1950) was a Catholic priest from the United States who served as the fourth president of St. Ambrose College in Davenport, Iowa, from 1915 to 1926.

Hannon was born March 21, 1879, in Holbrook, Iowa. He graduated from St. Ambrose College in 1901 and studied for the priesthood at Kenrick Seminary near St. Louis, Missouri. He was ordained a priest in St. Louis in June 1903.

He was assigned to the faculty of St. Ambrose and taught English and history at the school from 1904 until 1912. He was named vice president, a position in which he served until 1915 when he took over the presidency. Hannon led the first endowment drive which raised $600,000 and oversaw the construction of the first gymnasium. Construction of Davis Hall was also begun when Hannon was president. Up to this time Ambrose Hall was the only building at St. Ambrose. He also updated the faculty and the curriculum. Each year he sent one or two of the priests on the faculty to a university to earn graduate degrees. He also increased the faculty's salaries to make the positions more attractive. The president's salary was raised to $1,000 a year, and the priests on the faculty were paid $300 a year and after 15 years they were paid $800 a year.

After his term as president ended in 1926 Hannon was named the pastor of St. Mathias Church in Muscatine, Iowa. In 1935 Pope Pius XI named him a Domestic Prelate upon the nomination of Bishop Henry Rohlman. Msgr. Hannon served as chairman of the diocesan building commission under Bishop Ralph Hayes. He died in 1950 at the age of 71.

Academic offices
Preceded by William Shannahan	President of St. Ambrose University; 1915–1926	Succeeded by Ulrich Hauber
