= Glennon Patrick Flavin =

Catholic bishop (1916–1995)

His Excellency The Most Reverend Glennon Patrick Flavin
- Bishop of Lincoln; Titular Bishop of Ioannina
- See: Diocese of Lincoln
- Appointed: May 29, 1967
- Installed: August 1967
- Term ended: March 24, 1992
- Predecessor: James Vincent Casey
- Successor: Fabian Bruskewitz
- Other posts: Auxiliary Bishop of St. Louis (1957–1967); Titular Bishop of Ioannina (1957–1967)

Orders
- Ordination: December 20, 1941 by John J. Glennon
- Consecration: May 30, 1957 by Joseph Ritter

Personal details
- Born: March 2, 1916 St. Louis, Missouri, US
- Died: August 27, 1995 (aged 79) Denton, Nebraska, US
- Buried: Cathedral of the Risen Christ, Lincoln, Nebraska
- Denomination: Roman Catholic
- Education: St. Louis Preparatory Seminary; Kenrick Seminary
- Motto: Ut Christus Regnet (That Christ may reign)

Styles of Glennon Flavin
- Reference style: The Most Reverend
- Spoken style: Your Excellency
- Religious style: Bishop

Ordination history of Glennon Patrick Flavin
History
Priestly ordination
- Ordained by: John J. Glennon
Episcopal consecration
- Principal consecrator: Joseph Ritter
- Co-consecrators: Charles Herman Helmsing, Leo Christopher Byrne

Glennon Patrick Flavin (March 2, 1916 – August 27, 1995) was an American prelate of the Roman Catholic Church. He served as bishop of the Diocese of Lincoln in Nebraska from 1967 to 1992. He previously served as an auxiliary bishop of the Archdiocese of St. Louis in Missouri from 1957 to 1967.

== Biography ==
=== Early life ===
Glennon Flavin was born on March 2, 1916, in St. Louis, Missouri, the youngest of six children. His father was a police lieutenant. His brother Cornelius also joined the priesthood. After graduating from St. Louis Preparatory Seminary, Glennon Flavin studied at Kenrick Seminary in Shrewsbury, Missouri.

=== Priesthood ===
Flavin was ordained a priest for the Archdiocese of Saint Louis by Archbishop John J. Glennon at the Cathedral of Saint Louis on December 20, 1941. He then served as a curate at St. Michael Church and taught algebra at the Cathedral Latin School in St. Louis. In 1948, he was named assistant director of the archdiocesan Mission Office, becoming its director in 1956. He became a curate at the Cathedral of St. Louis and private secretary to Archbishop Joseph Ritter in 1949.

=== Auxiliary Bishop of St. Louis ===
On April 17, 1957, Flavin was appointed as an auxiliary bishop of St. Louis and titular bishop of Ioannina by Pope Pius XII. He received his episcopal consecration at the Cathedral of Saint Louis on May 30, 1957, from Archbishop Ritter, with Bishops Charles Helmsing and Leo Byrne serving as co-consecrators. Flavin selected as his episcopal motto: "Ut Christus Regnet" (Latin: "That Christ may reign").

In addition to his episcopal duties, Flavin was named pastor of Our Lady of Lourdes Parish in University City, Missouri, in 1960.

=== Bishop of Lincoln ===
Flavin was selected as the seventh bishop of Lincoln by Pope Paul VI on May 29, 1967. As bishop, Flavin greatly increased the number of priestly vocations during his tenure. He founded the School Sisters of Christ the King in 1976. In 1981, he prohibited women from serving as lectors during mass; in response, Archbishop Rembert Weakland called his actions "a step backward and offensive."

=== Retirement and legacy ===
After twenty-four years as bishop, Flavin retired on March 24, 1992. Glennon Flavin died from cancer at his residence in Denton, Nebraska, on August 27, 1995, at age 79. He is buried in the chapel of the Cathedral of the Risen Christ in Lincoln.

Catholic Church titles
Preceded by James Vincent Casey	Bishop of Lincoln; 1967–1992	Succeeded by Fabian Bruskewitz
Preceded by –	Auxiliary Bishop of St. Louis; 1957–1967	Succeeded by –
