= Louis Benedict Kucera =

Catholic bishop (1888–1957)

His Excellency, The Most Reverend Louis Benedict Kucera
- Bishop of Lincoln
- See: Diocese of Lincoln
- In office: 1930-1957
- Predecessor: Francis Beckman
- Successor: James Vincent Casey

Orders
- Ordination: June 8, 1915 by John Ireland
- Consecration: October 28, 1931 by Francis Beckman

Personal details
- Born: August 24, 1888 Wheatland, Minnesota, US
- Died: May 9, 1957 (aged 68) Lincoln, Nebraska, US
- Denomination: Roman Catholic
- Parents: John Wenceslaus and Mary (née Skluzacek) Kucera
- Education: St. John's College; College of St. Thomas; St. Paul Seminary
- Motto: Omnibus prodesse (To benefit everyone)

Styles of Louis Benedict Kucera
- Reference style: His Excellency; The Most Reverend
- Spoken style: Your Excellency
- Religious style: Bishop

Louis Benedict Kucera (August 24, 1888 – May 9, 1957) was an American prelate of the Roman Catholic Church. He served as bishop of the Diocese of Lincoln in Nebraska from 1930 until his death.

== Biography ==
=== Early life ===
Louis Kucera was born in Wheatland, Minnesota, to John Wenceslaus and Mary (née Skluzacek) Kucera, who were Bohemian immigrants. He attended St. John's College before studying at the College of St. Thomas, both in St. Paul, Minnesota. After his graduation in 1909, he was appointed to the West Point Military Academy in West Point, New York. However, Kucera declined the appointment, choosing instead to study for the priesthood. He then entered St. Paul Seminary in St. Paul.

=== Priesthood ===
Kucera was ordained to the priesthood for the Archdiocese of Dubuque on June 8, 1915, at the Cathedral of Saint Paul in St. Paul by Archbishop John Ireland. After his ordination, the archdiocese assigned Kucera as a curate at St. Patrick's Parish in Tama, Iowa In 1916, he was named professor of Latin and prefect of discipline at Columbia College in Dubuque. In 1925, Kucera was named pastor of Holy Trinity Parish in Protivin, Iowa.

=== Bishop of Lincoln ===
On June 30, 1930, Kucera was appointed the fifth Bishop of Lincoln by Pope Pius XI. He received his episcopal consecration at Saint Raphael Cathedral in Dubuque on October 28, 1930, from Archbishop Francis Beckman, with Bishops Thomas Drumm and Henry Rohlman serving as co-consecrators. The Vatican named Kucera as an assistant at the pontifical throne and in 1955 a count of the apostolic palace.

Kucera died in Lincoln on May 9, 1957, at age 68.

Catholic Church titles
Preceded by Francis Beckman	Bishop of Lincoln; 1930–1957	Succeeded by James Vincent Casey
