= Thomas Bonacum =

Irish-born American prelate

His Excellency, The Right Reverend Thomas Bonacum
- Bishop of Lincoln
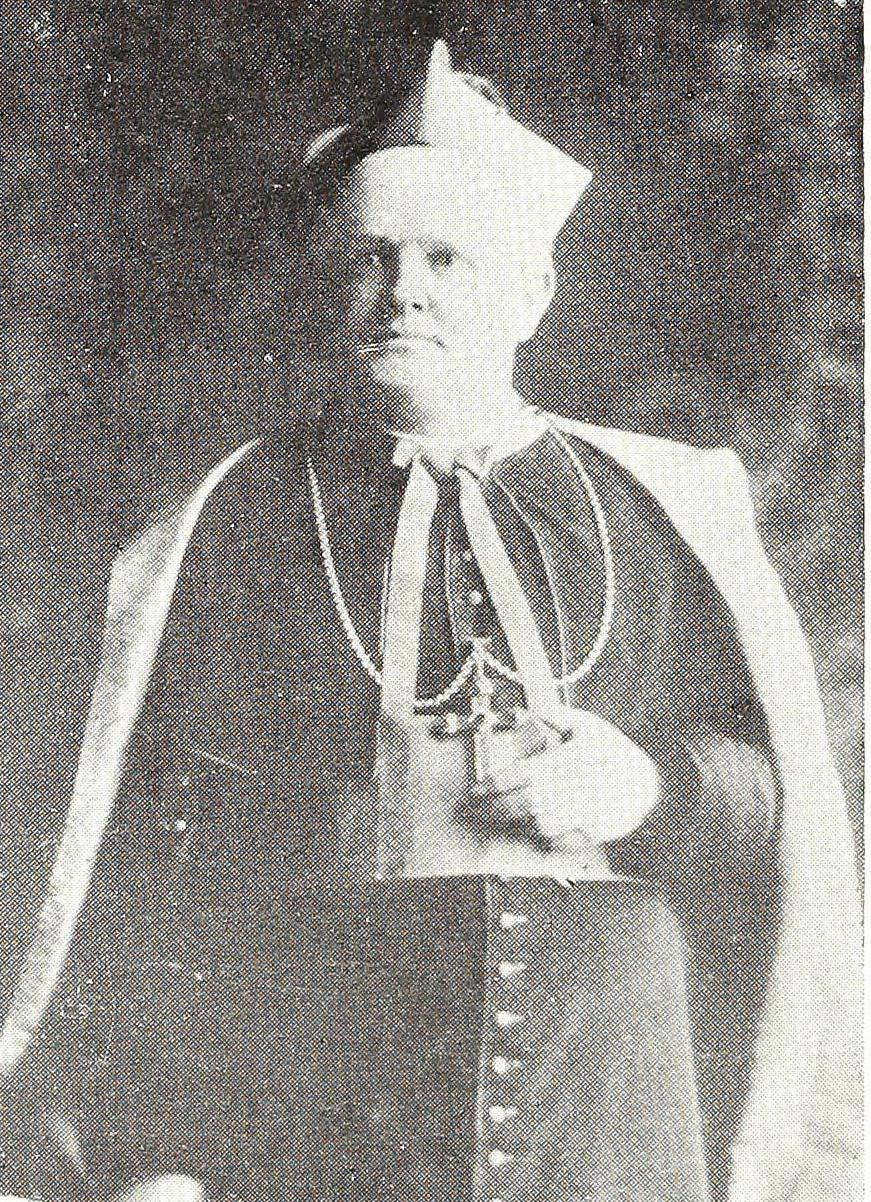
- Church: Catholic Church
- Diocese: Diocese of Lincoln
- Predecessor: Office established
- Successor: John Henry Tihen

Orders
- Ordination: June 18, 1870 by Joseph Melcher
- Consecration: November 30, 1887 by Peter Richard Kenrick

Personal details
- Born: January 29, 1847 Penane, County Tipperary, Ireland
- Died: February 4, 1911 (aged 64) Lincoln, Nebraska, U.S.
- Education: Saint Francis de Sales Seminary; St. Vincent's Seminary; University of Würzburg
- Motto: Per crucem victoria (Victory through the cross)

Thomas Bonacum (January 29, 1847 – February 4, 1911) was an Irish-born American prelate of the Catholic Church. He was the first bishop of the Diocese of Lincoln in Nebraska, serving from 1887 until his death in 1911.

== Biography ==
=== Early life ===
Thomas Bonacum was born January 29, 1847, in Penane, near Thurles, County Tipperary in Ireland, the youngest of four children of Edmund and Mary (née McGrath) Bonacum. While he was still an infant, the family immigrated to the United States in 1848, settling in St. Louis, Missouri.

Bonacum received his early education in St. Louis before attending Saint Francis de Sales Seminary in St. Francis, Wisconsin, from 1863 to 1867. Returning to Missouri, he completed his studies for the priesthood at St. Vincent's Seminary in Cape Girardeau, Missouri.

=== Priesthood ===
Bonacum was ordained a priest for the Archdiocese of St. Louis on June 18, 1870, at St. Mary of Victories Church in St. Louis by Bishop Joseph Melcher, the Bishop of Green Bay.

After his ordination, the archdiocese assigned Bonacum as assistant pastor of St. Joseph's Parish in Edina, Missouri. He was transferred in 1871 to St. Stephen's Parish in Indian Creek, Missouri. In 1874, the archdiocese appointed Bonacum as pastor of St. Peter's Parish in Kirkwood, Missouri.

In 1877. the archdiocese sent Bonacum to study at the University of Würzburg in the German Empire for two years. While there, he studied theology under Franz Hettinger and canon law and church history under Joseph Hergenröther. After returning to the United States, Bonacum served as pastor of St. Patrick's Parish in Rolla, Missouri, until 1880, when he was transferred to Immaculate Conception Parish in St. Louis. He remained there for a year before being named in 1882 as pastor of Holy Name Parish .

While pastor at Holy Name, Bonacum attended the third Plenary Council of Baltimore in Baltimore, Maryland, from November to December 1884, as a theological consultant to Archbishop Peter Kenrick. He greatly impressed the bishops at the council, who nominated Bonacum to be the first bishop of the proposed Diocese of Belleville in Illinois. However, the Vatican postponed the establishment of the diocese and Bonacum remained at St. Louis.

=== Bishop of Lincoln ===
On July 7, 1887, a cablegram from Rome announced that Pope Leo XIII had appointed Bonacum as the first bishop of the newly erected Diocese of Lincoln. The official papal document confirming his appointment was dated August 9, 1887, arriving the following September. Bonacum received his episcopal consecration on November 30, 1887, from Kenrick, with Bishop Louis Fink and Bishop James O'Connor serving as co-consecrators, at St. John's Church in St. Louis. Bonacum was installed on December 21, 1887, at St. Teresa's Pro-Cathedral in Lincoln.

In 1888, the first full year of Bonacum's episcopate, the diocese contained a Catholic population of 23,000 with 32 priests, 29 parishes, and three parochial schools. By the time of Bonacum's death in 1911, there was a Catholic population of 37,000 with 84 priests, 135 churches and 65 with resident pastors, and 28 parochial schools.

==== Egan dispute ====
In October 1888, Bonacum sued Patrick Egan, a prominent Lincoln citizen and later U.S. Ambassador to Chile, for failing to pay a pledge he had made for the improvement of St. Teresa's Pro-Cathedral. It was rumored that Egan, a staunch Republican, had reneged on the pledge because Bonacum had attended a Democratic Party reception. The case went to the Nebraska Supreme Court, which ruled in Bonacum's favor in January 1894, ordering Egan to pay the pledge.

==== Corbett dispute ====
In 1891, Bonacum brought Reverend Martin Corbett of Palmyra, Nebraska, with whom he had many quarrels, before a diocesan court of five priest. The court dismissed the charges against Corbett. In 1894, Bonacum told Corbett resign his position, which he refused to do. Bonacum then wrote a letter announcing Corbett's suspension to his congregation. In response, Corbett sued Bonacum for libel. The suit was dismissed in 1894. This was the first time a Catholic bishop was brought to criminal court in the United States.

==== Murphy dispute ====
A group of priests submitted a list of complaints against Bonacum to Archbishop Francesco Satolli, the apostolic delegate to the United States, in 1893. In retaliation, Bonacum tried in 1895 to expel one of those priests, Reverend William Murphy. Murphy had presided over the 1891 diocesan court trial for Martin Corbett. Murphy appealed his expulsion to church authorities. In 1896, an ecclesiastical court of the Archdiocese of Dubuque reversed Bonacum's decision and ordered him to pay a fine as well as Murphy's legal fees.

In 1900, Bonacum tried to remove Murphy from his position as pastor of St. Vincent's Parish in Seward, Nebraska, which also included charge of Immaculate Conception Church in Ulysses, Nebraska. When Murphy refused to step down, Bonacum excommunicated him and brought action in court to have him removed from the church property. This litigation would last for more than ten years, moving through both secular and ecclesiastical courts and even coming to the personal attention of Pope Pius X. On June 18, 1909, Bonacum came to Ulysses to evict Murphy from Immaculate Conception Church. However, Murphy had strong support from the congregation and a mob of more than 200 people forced Bonacum to leave. Even when the bishop tried to take a taxi out of town, the mob followed him and forced him to get out of the car and walk several miles to the next town.

That battle only ended in 1911, when both Bonacum and Murphy died; the bishop from natural causes and the priest from a car accident. As a result of their feud, Pius X issued a new rule prohibiting priests or bishops from suing a fellow clergyman in secular court.

=== Death and legacy ===
Thomas Bonacum died from complications of pneumonia and Bright's disease on February 4, 1911, aged 64. Upon his death, Lincoln mayor Don Love issued the following proclamation:

"By this sad event we have lost not only a great prelate but a distinguished and public-spirited citizen as well...It would be a fitting tribute to display emblems of mourning along our public streets and to close our offices and places of business during the hour of his funeral."

Catholic Church titles
| Preceded by none (diocese erected) | Bishop of Lincoln; 1887–1911 | Succeeded by John Henry Tihen |
