= Hastings Catholic Schools =

Location
- 521 North Kansas Avenue (St. Cecilia Middle/High School); 721 Creighton Avenue (St. Michael's Elementary School); Hastings, Nebraska 68901; United States
- 40°35′17″N 98°23′10″W

Information
- Type: Private school
- Religious affiliation: Roman Catholic
- Established: September 1, 1912
- Superintendent: Thomas Brouliette
- Principal: Cyrus R. Rowan (6-12 principal)
- Grades: K–12
- Colors: Blue and white
- Fight song: "On Wisconsin"
- Team name: Bluehawks/Hawkettes
- Accreditation: North Central Association of Colleges and Schools
- Website: www.stchastings.org

Hastings Catholic Schools is a private, Roman Catholic K-12 school system in Hastings, Nebraska, United States. It is located in the Roman Catholic Diocese of Lincoln.

The institution has two constituent parts: St. Michael's Elementary School, which provides instruction for preschool through grade five, and St. Cecilia Middle/High School, which provides instruction for grades six through 12, both on separate campuses.

As of the 2021–2022 academic year, the school has an agricultural education program.

== Athletics ==
St. Cecilia is a member of the Nebraska School Activities Association. They have won the following NSAA State Championships:

- Boys' football - 2000, 2009, 2010 (runner-up - 1983, 1995)
- Girls' volleyball - 1982, 1983, 1987, 1989, 1990, 2013 (runner-up - 1986, 1988)
- Boys' basketball - 1958, 1969, 2008, 2009, 2010 (runner-up - 1959)
- Girls' basketball - 1977, 1978, 1979, 2011 (runner-up - 1982, 2014)
- Boys' track and field - 1993, 2001, 2010, 2011 (runner-up - 2005, 2009)
- Girls' track and field - 1971, 1972, 1973, 1974, 1975, 1976, 1977, 1980 (runner-up - 2009)
- Boys' golf - 2008 (runner-up - 2009)
- Boys' cross country - 2009
