= Martin Cone =

Catholic priest (1882–1963)

Rt. Rev. Msgr. Martin Cone, Ph.D., PA
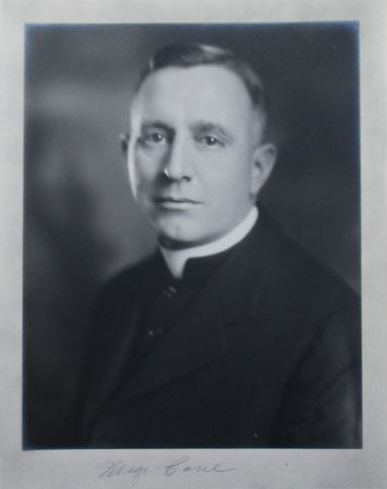
- Born: December 14, 1882; Clinton, Iowa, USA
- Died: 1963 (aged 80–81); Davenport, Iowa, USA
- Known for: President of St. Ambrose College, Davenport, Iowa

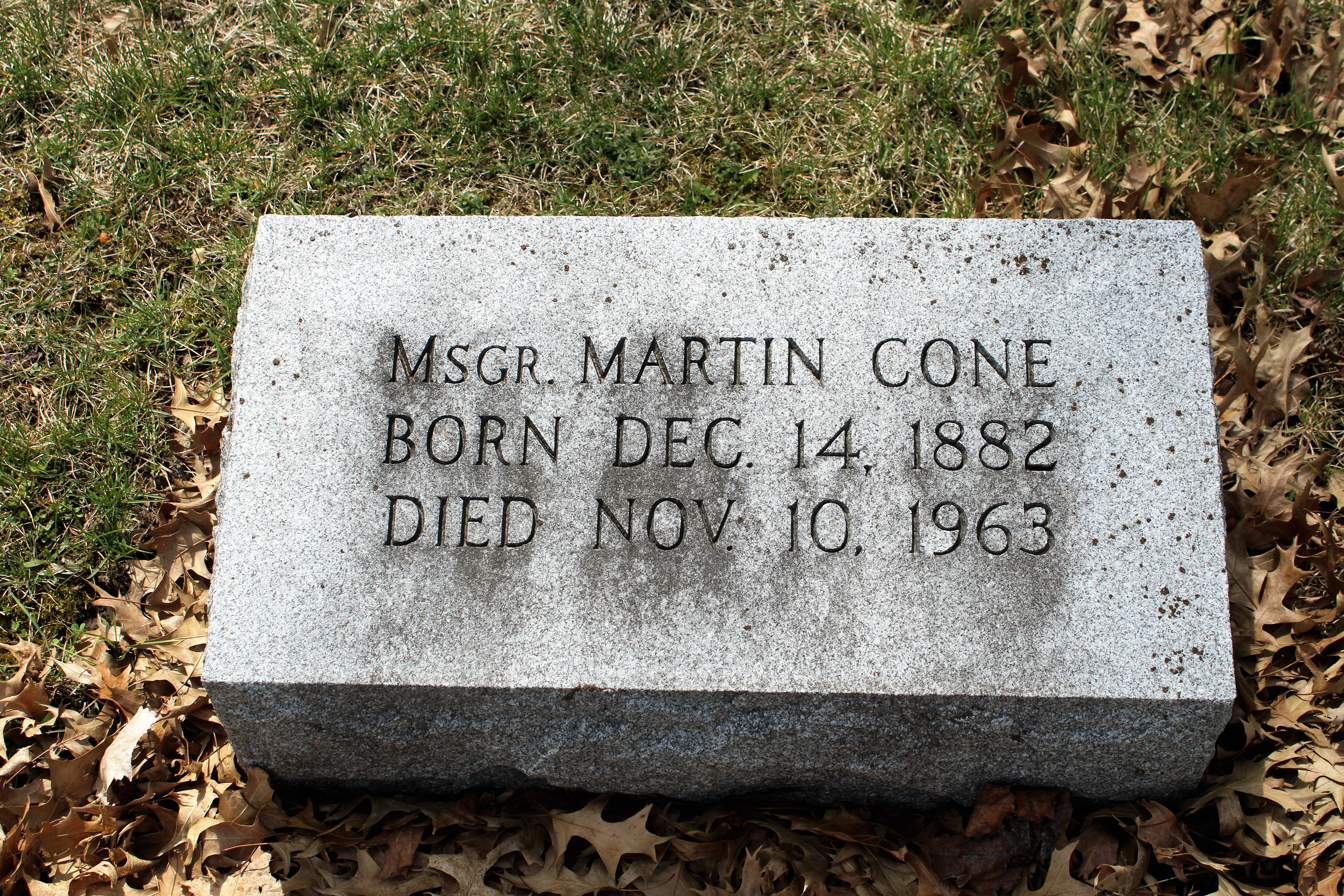
Msgr. Cone's grave in Mount Calvary Cemetery in Davenport

Martin Cone (1882–1963) was a Catholic priest in the United States and served as the sixth president of St. Ambrose College in Davenport, Iowa from 1930 to 1937.

== Biography ==
He was a native of Clinton, Iowa, and studied for the priesthood at St. Mary’s Seminary in Baltimore, where he was ordained a priest for the Diocese of Davenport on June 12, 1912. He did graduate studies at The Catholic University of America in Washington, DC and the University of Iowa where he earned a doctorate.

He was assigned to the faculty of St. Ambrose College after ordination. Cone was a social worker who taught social sciences at St. Ambrose for 16 years before becoming president. While serving at the college he was also pastor of St. Patrick’s parish in Villa Nova. Cone led the effort to bring Catholic Charities to the diocese in the late 1920s, and served as its first director from 1929 until his death in 1963. He had an interest in St. Vincent’s Home in Davenport where he helped to improve the living conditions of the children and professionalized the staff. As president at St Ambrose he took over at the beginning of the Great Depression. Cone is credited with building the faculty, taking over at a time when priests were paid $15 a month for teaching. Cone also instituted summer sessions on campus. He was also instrumental in developing a college for women in Davenport that would become Marycrest College. In the 1930s he worked with Msgrs. William Shannahan and George Giglinger to develop a local radio program on WOC that featured Catholic topics. In 1937 he joined the board of the diocesan newspaper, The Catholic Messenger.

Bishop Henry Rohlman nominated Father Cone for papal honors twice. In 1931 Pope Pius XI named him a Domestic Prelate. Pope Pius XII named him a Protonotary Apostolic in 1941.

After his presidency Msgr. Cone was appointed pastor and rector of Sacred Heart Cathedral, and vicar general of the Diocese of Davenport. When Bishop Rohlman became coadjutor archbishop of Dubuque in 1944, Msgr. Cone became administrator of the diocese until Bishop Ralph Leo Hayes was named Bishop of Davenport. In the 1940s he helped organize the diocese’s participation in the War Emergency and Relief Collection, which was sponsored by the National Catholic Welfare Council. He died in Davenport in 1963 at the age of 80.

Academic offices
Preceded by Ulrich Hauber	President of St. Ambrose University; 1930–1937	Succeeded by Carl Meinberg
