= Francis Beckman =

American prelate

His Excellency, The Most Reverend Francis Joseph L. Beckman S.T.D
- Archbishop of Dubuque; Titular Archbishop of Phulli
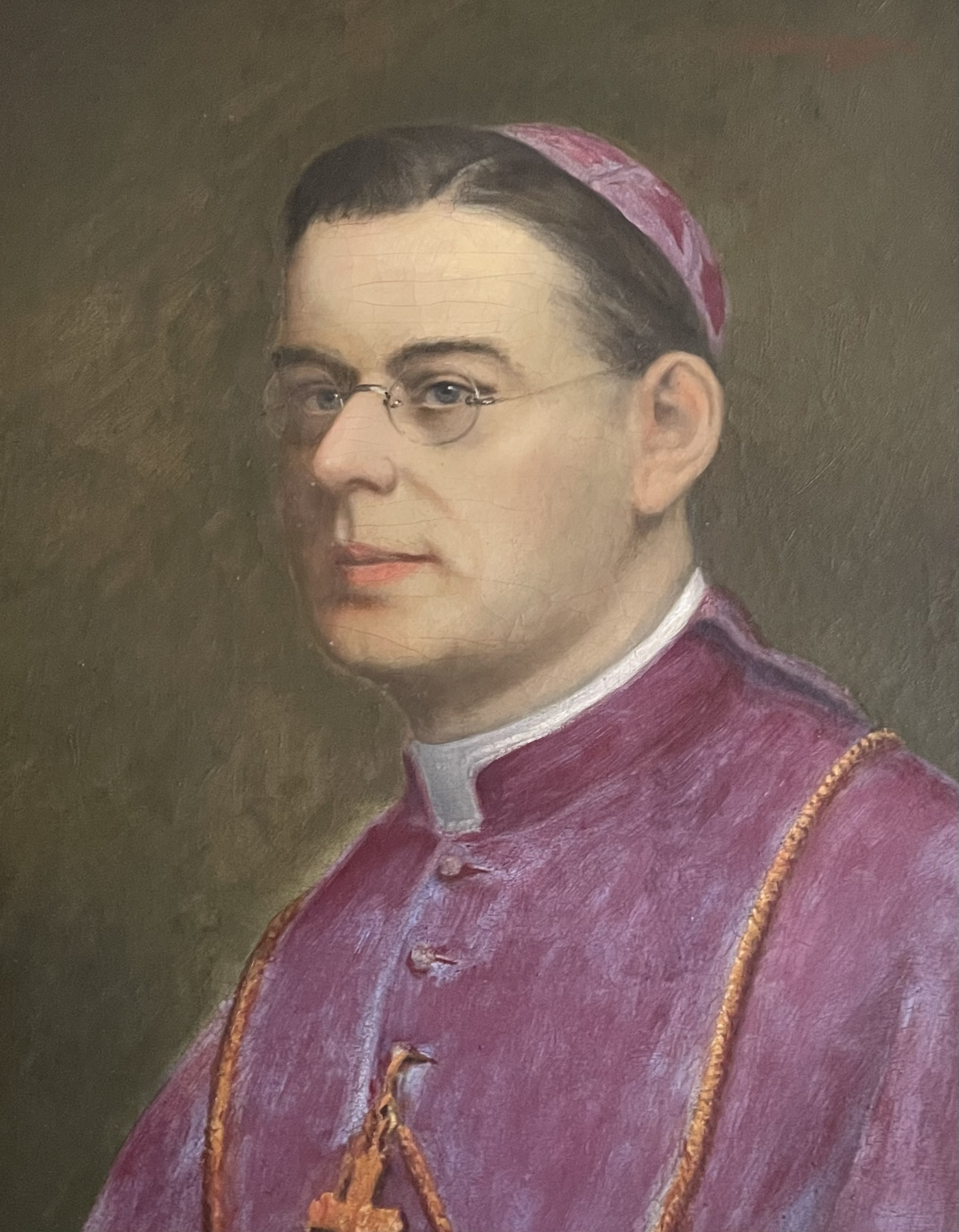
- Bishop Francis Beckman as depicted in a painting hanging in Mount St. Mary's Seminary in Cincinnati.
- Church: Roman Catholic Church
- See: Diocese of Dubuque
- In office: January 17, 1930 – Titular Archbishop of Phulli; November 11, 1946
- Predecessor: James John Keane
- Successor: Henry Rohlman
- Previous post: Bishop of Lincoln

Orders
- Ordination: June 20, 1902
- Consecration: May 1, 1924 by Henry K. Moeller

Personal details
- Born: October 25, 1875 Cincinnati, Ohio, US
- Died: October 17, 1948 (aged 72) Chicago, Illinois, US
- Education: University of Louvain; Pontifical Gregorian University
- Motto: Veritas liberabit vos (The truth will set you free)
- Coat of arms

Ordination history of Francis Beckman
History
Episcopal consecration
- Consecrated by: Henry K. Moeller
- Date: May 1, 1924
Episcopal succession
Bishops consecrated by Francis Beckman as principal consecrator
- Louis Benedict Kucera: October 28, 1930

Francis Joseph Beckman (October 25, 1875 – October 17, 1948) was an American Catholic prelate who served as Bishop of Lincoln from 1924 to 1930 and as Archbishop of Dubuque from 1930 to 1946.

== Biography ==
=== Early life ===
Francis Beckman was born on October 25, 1875, in Cincinnati, Ohio, to Francis and Elizabeth (née Fenker) Beckman. He studied at St. Gregory Seminary and Mount St. Mary's Seminary in Cincinnati. He then attended the University of Louvain in Leuven, Belgium, and the Pontifical Gregorian University in Rome.

=== Priesthood ===
Beckman was ordained to the priesthood in Cincinnati for the Archdiocese of Cincinnati on June 20, 1902, by Archbishop William Henry Elder. Following his ordination, Beckman received a Licentiate of Sacred Theology (1907) and later a Doctor of Sacred Theology (1908) from the Gregorian.

After his return to Cincinnati, Beckman joined the faculty of Mount St. Mary's Seminary, where he served as professor of philosophy and dogmatic theology (1908–1912). He was rector of Mount St. Mary's from 1912 to 1924. He also served as Censor Librorum and a consultor for the archdiocese.

=== Bishop of Lincoln ===
Coat of arms as bishop of Lincoln

On December 23, 1923, Beckman was appointed the fourth bishop of Lincoln by Pope Pius XI. He received his episcopal consecration on May 1, 1924, from Archbishop Henry Moeller at the Cathedral of St. Peter in Chains in Cincinnati. Bishops Joseph Schrembs of Cleveland and Joseph Chartrand of Indianapolis were the principal co-consecrators. Beckman served the diocese for almost six years. During his time in Lincoln, he served as apostolic administrator of the Diocese of Omaha from June 1926 to July 1928.

=== Archbishop of Dubuque ===
Pope Pius XI appointed Beckman as archbishop of Dubuque on January 17, 1930. Beckman shepherded the archdiocese through the Great Depression and World War II. During his tenure as archbishop, the St. Vincent de Paul Society, the Holy Name Societies, National Catholic Rural Life Conference, Conference on Industrial Relations, and the Catholic Youth Organization grew with his support. The Catholic Student's Mission Crusade, which he founded while in Cincinnati, held its 1935 convention in Dubuque. In 1939, Beckman renamed Columbia College in Dubuque as Loras College in honor of Dubuque's first bishop, Mathias Loras.

Impressed with the Catholic culture he had seen in Europe, Beckman began to collect fine art pieces. He started with a small collection of artifacts belonging to Reverend William Kessler at Columbia Academy in Dubuque. Beckman placed several art pieces in a museum at Columbia College. The Beckman collection, including works of Winslow Homer, Rembrandt, Rubens, and Van Dyck, was valued in 1938 at $1.5 million.

In 1936, promoter Phillip Suetter sold Beckman on investing borrowed money in gold mines. Suetter told Beckman that investing in mines in Oregon could bring the archdiocese $1 million per year in revenue. To invest in the gold mines, Beckman signed promissory notes on behalf of the archdiocese. However, the entire scheme was a fraud. Suetter was arrested and Beckman was forced to testify at his trial for security fraud.US President Franklin Roosevelt directed the Federal Bureau of Investigation (FBI) to investigate Beckman to determine the extent of his involvement in the scam. Soon the holders of the promissory notes began demanding repayment. The archdiocese sold Beckman's art collection to help pay off the investors. The ultimate loss to the archdiocese was around $600,000.

In December 1942, Beckman announced the construction of a chapel at Loras College to honor the death of Reverend Aloysius Schmitt, a priest from the archdiocese. He was serving as a military chaplain on the battleship USS Oklahoma during the December 1941 Japanese attack on Pearl Harbor. Schmitt helped 12 sailors escape the capsizing ship before losing his life.

As a result of all of Beckman's problems, on June 15, 1944, Pope Pius XII appointed Bishop Henry Rohlman of Davenport as coadjutor archbishop and apostolic administrator. Beckman remained archbishop of Dubuque, but the Vatican gave actual authority to Rohlman.

=== Retirement and legacy ===
Beckman remained archbishop of Dubuque until Pope Pius XII named him titular archbishop of Phulli and accepted his retirement on November 11, 1946. Following his retirement, Beckman moved back to Cincinnati.

Francis Beckman died at the Alexian Brothers Hospital in Chicago, Illinois, on October 17, 1948, at age 72. He was buried in the mortuary chapel of Saint Raphael's Cathedral in Dubuque.

== Viewpoints ==
=== Music ===
Beckman began a campaign against jitterbug and swing music in 1938. He spoke in October 1938 before the National Council of Catholic Women meeting in Biloxi, Mississippi. He denounced swing as "a degenerated musical system... turned loose to gnaw away the moral fiber of young people" which would lead one down a "primrose path to Hell."

=== Foreign policy ===
Beckman adopted a non-interventionist stance in the years before World War II. He wrote an open letter to Senator William Borah of Idaho encouraging him in his efforts to maintain American neutrality.

At a rally on October 20, 1939, after the start of World War II in Europe, Beckman praised the antisemitic radio priest Reverend Charles Coughlin in his stand for non-intervention by the United States. The next week, Beckman went on the radio with Coughlin and said that the Communists wanted the U.S. to enter the war so that, worn out by the war, Americans would become more susceptible to communist thought.

At an America First rally at Loras College in June 1941, Beckman denounced the repeal of the arms embargo provision of the Neutrality Acts of the 1930s, allowing the sale of arms by the United States to France and the United Kingdom. In October 1931, he made a speech that suggested wealthy Jewish financiers were responsible for the war:

This war is nothing more nor less than a struggle to re-establish the shattered boundaries of international finance. The entrenched internationalists had their day; they financed the world into eternal debt and milked whole peoples, grinding them down into the dust of poverty.

In November 1941, just weeks before the attack on Pearl Harbor, Beckman denounced American military aid to the Soviet Union, which had been invaded by Germany in June 1941.

Catholic Church titles
Preceded by James Keane	Archbishop of Dubuque; 1930–1946	Succeeded by Henry Rohlman
Preceded by Charles Joseph O'Reilly	Bishop of Lincoln; 1923–1930	Succeeded by Louis Benedict Kucera
