= James D. Conley =

American Catholic prelate (born 1955)

His Excellency, The Most Reverend James D. Conley
- Bishop of Lincoln
- Church: Catholic
- Diocese: Lincoln
- Appointed: September 14, 2012
- Installed: November 20, 2012
- Predecessor: Fabian Bruskewitz
- Previous posts: Apostolic Administrator of Denver (2011‍–‍2012); Auxiliary Bishop of Denver & Titular Bishop of Cissa (2008‍–‍2012)

Orders
- Ordination: May 18, 1985 by Eugene John Gerber
- Consecration: May 30, 2008 by Charles J. Chaput, Michael Owen Jackels, Paul Stagg Coakley

Personal details
- Born: March 19, 1955 (age 71) Kansas City, Missouri, US
- Education: University of Kansas; Mount St. Mary's Seminary; Alphonsian Academy
- Motto: Cor ad cor loquitur (Latin for 'Heart speaks to heart')

Ordination history
History
Priestly ordination
- Ordained by: Eugene Gerber
Episcopal consecration
- Principal consecrator: Charles Chaput
- Co-consecrators: Michael Jackels; Paul Coakley
- Styles
- Reference style: His Excellency
- Spoken style: Your Excellency
- Religious style: Bishop

James Douglas Conley (born March 19, 1955) is an American Catholic prelate serving as bishop of the Diocese of Lincoln in Nebraska. He served as an auxiliary bishop in the Archdiocese of Denver in Colorado from 2008 to 2012.

== Biography ==
=== Early life ===
James Douglas Conley was born on March 19, 1955, in Kansas City, Missouri, to Carl and Betty Conley. He was raised in a Presbyterian family and has one adopted sister, Susan. Conley is partly of Wea Native American descent through his paternal grandmother's family. The family moved to Denver, Colorado, in 1957 and to Arvada, Colorado, in 1959.

Conley attended Hoskinson Cottage School in Arvada before moving to Overland Park, Kansas at age eight. Conley graduated from Shawnee Mission West High School in Shawnee Mission, Kansas, in 1973, and then entered the University of Kansas (KU) in Lawrence, Kansas. Due to his Native American heritage, the Federal Bureau of Indian Affairs paid for a portion of his college education. Conley studied in KU's Integrated Humanities Program, whose courses on Greek and Roman classics led him to convert to Catholicism during his junior year of college on December 6, 1975.

Conley obtained a bachelor's degree in English Literature from KU in 1977, and then worked in construction in Kansas City, Kansas, before travelling through Europe. He considered a monastic vocation while staying at the Abbey of Notre Dame de Fontgombault in France.

Conley returned to Kansas in 1978 and worked on a friend's farm near Courtland, Kansas. In 1980, he decided to pursue a vocation to the priesthood and entered St. Pius X Seminary in Erlanger, Kentucky. Conley later studied at Mount St. Mary's Seminary in Emmitsburg, Maryland, where he earned a Master of Divinity degree in 1985.

=== Priesthood ===
Conley was ordained a priest at the Cathedral of the Immaculate Conception in Wichita by Bishop Eugene Gerber for the Diocese of Wichita on May 18, 1985. After his 1985 ordination, the diocese assigned Conley as associate pastor at St. Patrick Parish in Wichita.

In 1989, Conley went to Rome to attend the Alphonsian Academy of the Pontifical Lateran University. He received a Licentiate in Moral Theology in 1991. After his return to Kansas in 1991, Conley was appointed as chaplain of the Newman Center at Wichita State University in Wichita, Kansas, and diocesan director of the Respect Life Office. His parents converted to Catholicism in 1991; Conley administered the sacraments of baptism and confirmation to them.

In 1996, the Vatican appointed Conley to the Congregation for Bishops in Rome. He was also named as chaplain at the University of Dallas' Rome campus. He left his chaplain position in 1997 to serve as adjunct instructor of theology at Christendom College's Rome Campus He was raised to the rank of chaplain of his holiness by Pope John Paul II on February 9, 2001. After ten years in Rome, Conley returned to Wichita and was named pastor of Blessed Sacrament Parish.

=== Auxiliary Bishop of Denver ===
On April 10, 2008, Conley was appointed as an auxiliary bishop of Denver and titular bishop of Cissa by Pope Benedict XVI. He was consecrated on May 30, 2008, by Archbishop Charles Chaput, with Bishop Michael Jackels and Archbishop Paul S. Coakley serving as co-consecrators, at the Cathedral Basilica of the Immaculate Conception. His episcopal motto, "Cor Ad Cor Loquitur (Latin: "Heart Speaks To Heart"), is taken from the motto of Cardinal John Newman.

Speaking on the Affordable Care Act for expanded health insurance coverage that was proposed by the Obama Administration in November 2009, Conley stated that Catholic bishops:

"have a few simple but important priorities. First, everyone should have access to basic health care, including immigrants...Second, reform should respect the dignity of every person, from conception to natural death... Third, real healthcare reform needs to include explicit, ironclad conscience protections for medical professionals and institutions so that they cannot be forced to violate their moral convictions. Fourth—and this is so obvious it sometimes goes unstated—any reform must be economically realistic and financially sustainable."

In September 2011, when the Vatican appointed Chaput as archbishop of the Archdiocese of Philadelphia, Conley was named apostolic administrator of the Archdiocese of Denver. He fulfilled this responsibility until July 2012, when the Vatican named Bishop Samuel Aquila as the new archbishop of Denver.

=== Bishop of Lincoln ===
On September 14, 2012, Pope Benedict XVI appointed Conley as bishop of Lincoln, succeeding Bishop Fabian Bruskewitz. Conley was installed on November 20, 2012, at the Cathedral of the Risen Christ in Lincoln.

In 2003, the diocese had participated in the first audit of implementation of the Charter for the Protection of Children and Young People. However, Bruskewitz later declined to participate in later audits, claiming that he was awaiting refinements to the audit process. In 2015, Conley announced that the diocese would fully participate in the charter audits.

On December 13, 2019, Conley announced that he was taking a medical leave of absence to treat depression, anxiety, insomnia, and tinnitus. The Vatican appointed Archbishop George J. Lucas to serve as apostolic administrator of the diocese during Conley's leave of absence. Conley returned to active service on November 13, 2020.

== See also ==
- Catholic Church hierarchy
- Catholic Church in the United States
- Historical list of the Catholic bishops of the United States
- List of Catholic bishops of the United States
- Lists of patriarchs, archbishops, and bishops

Catholic Church titles
Preceded by Fabian Bruskewitz	Bishop of Lincoln; 2012–present	Incumbent
Preceded by Gianfranco Gardin OFM Conv	Titular Bishop of Cissa; 2008–2012	Succeeded by Gonzalo Alonso Calzada Guerrero
