= Catholic Diocese of Lincoln =

Latin Catholic territory in Nebraska, US

Coordinates: 40°48′35″N 96°40′31″W

Diocese of Lincoln Dioecesis Lincolnensis

Catholic
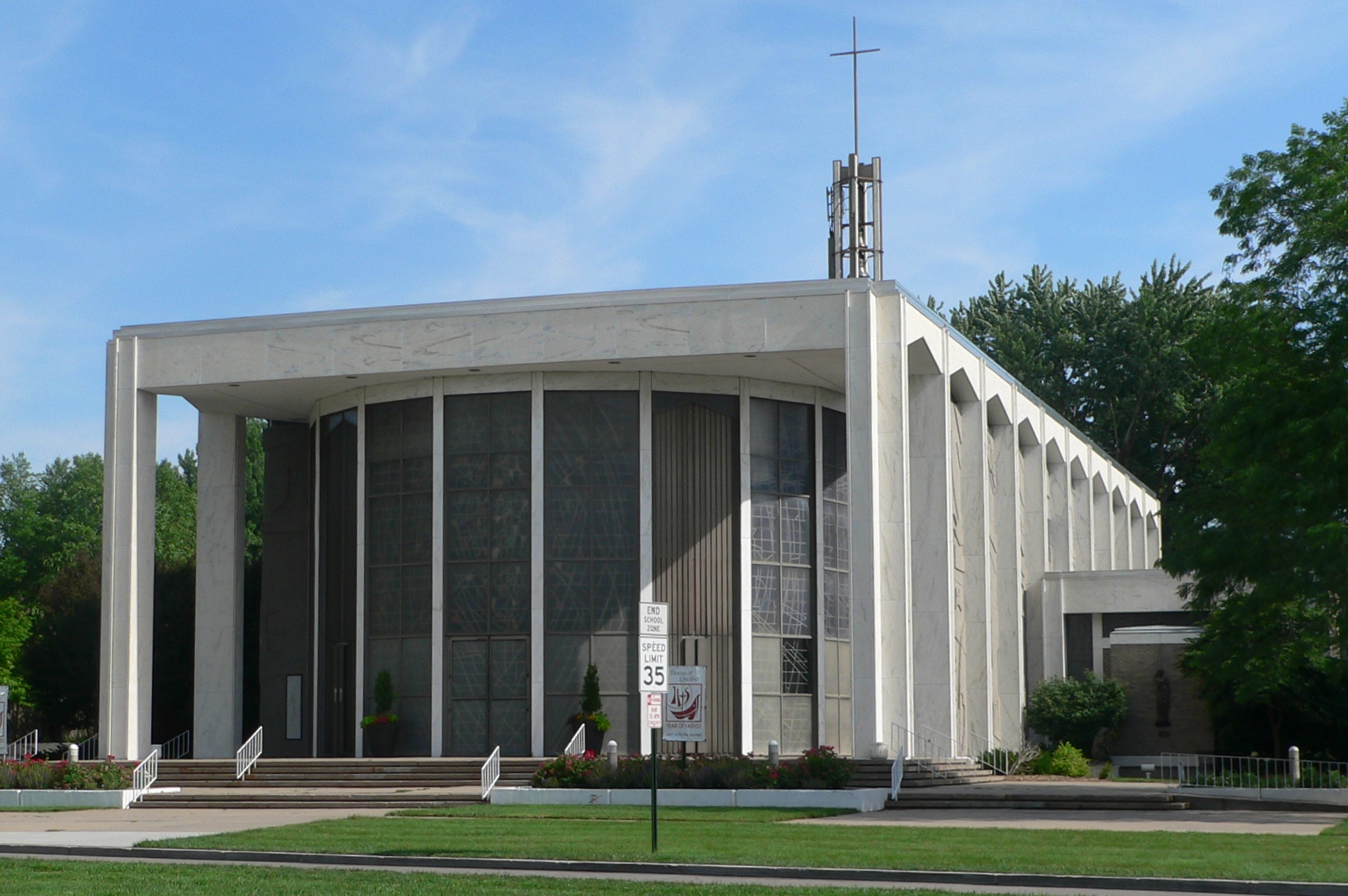
- Cathedral of the Risen Christ

- Coat of Arms of the Diocese of Lincoln

Location
- Country: United States
- Territory: The territory of Nebraska that lies south of the Platte River across southern Nebraska
- Ecclesiastical province: Omaha

Statistics
- Area: 23,844 sq mi (61,760 km^{2})
- Population: Total; Catholics: (as of 2020); 620,359; 95,104 (15.3%)
- Parishes: 134
- Schools: 30

Information
- Denomination: Catholic
- Sui iuris church: Latin Church
- Rite: Roman Rite
- Established: August 2, 1887 (139 years ago)
- Cathedral: Cathedral of the Risen Christ
- Patron saint: Immaculate Conception

Current leadership
- Pope: Leo XIV
- Bishop: James D. Conley
- Metropolitan Archbishop: Michael George McGovern
- Bishops emeritus: Fabian Bruskewitz

Map
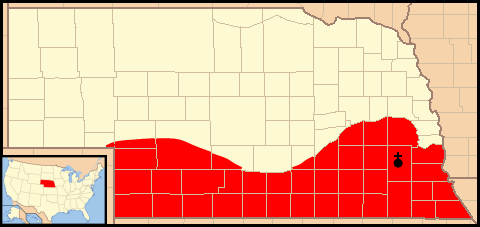

Website
- www.dioceseoflincoln.org

The Diocese of Lincoln (Latin: Dioecesis Lincolnensis) is a Latin Catholic diocese in Nebraska, United States, and comprises the majority of the eastern and central portions of the state south of the Platte River. It is a suffragan see to the archdiocese of Omaha. The episcopal see is in Lincoln, Nebraska.

The diocese was established in 1887, following the arrival of many Irish, German and Czech Catholic immigrants to the region. Bishop James D. Conley has been bishop there since 2012. The Cathedral of the Risen Christ is the cathedral parish of the diocese.

== History ==
=== 1800 to 1862 ===
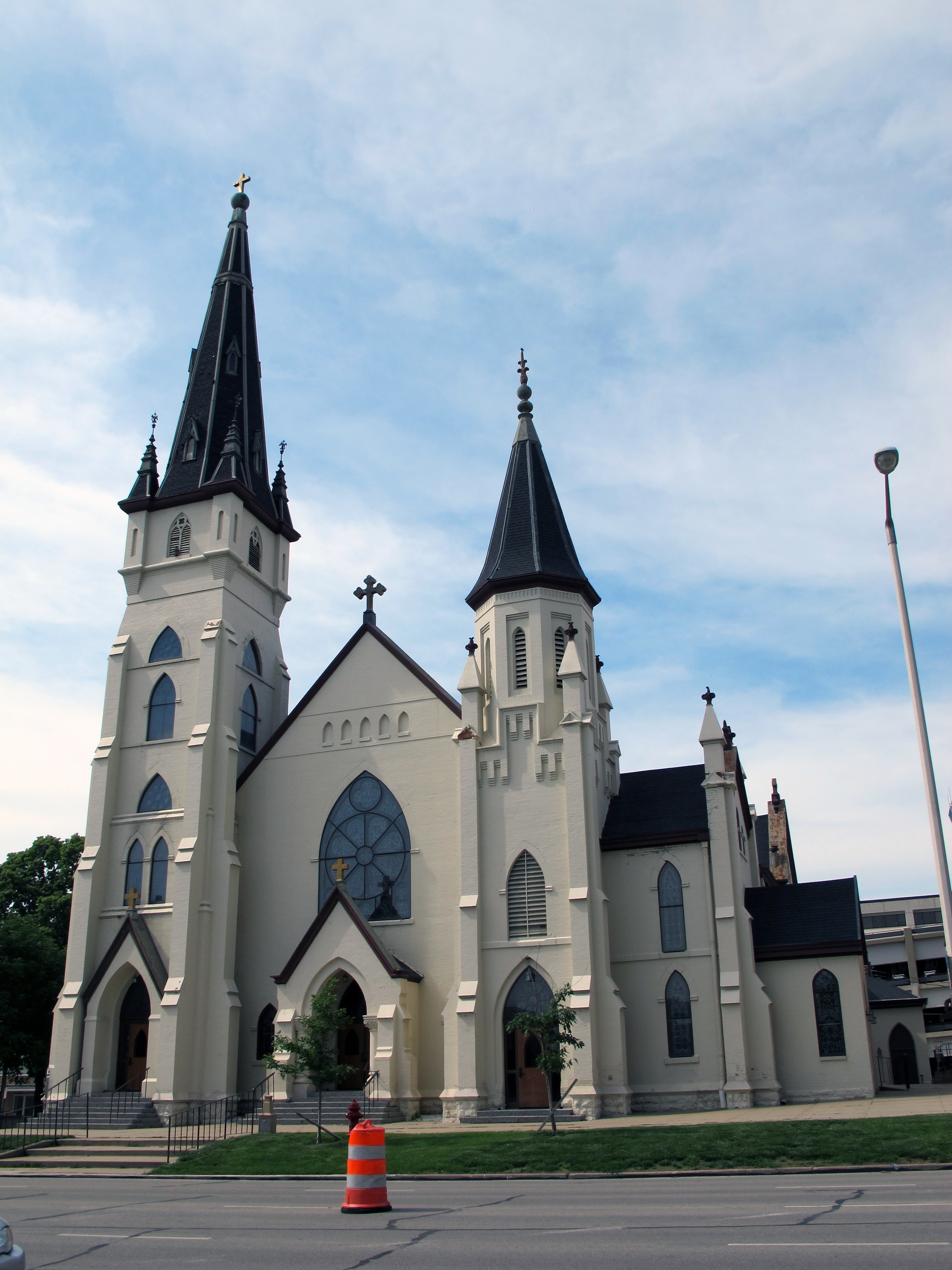
St. Mary's Church, Lincoln, Nebraska (2015)

The first Catholic missionary to visit Nebraska was Pierre-Jean De Smet, who crossed the Missouri River into Nebraska to baptize two infants of the Otoe people near present-day Bellevue in 1838. At that time, the area was under the jurisdiction of the Diocese of St. Louis. DeSmet later traveled along the Platte River to a council of the tribes.

Pope Pius IX in 1850 erected the Vicariate Apostolic of Indian Territory East of the Rocky Mountains. This huge jurisdiction contained the present-day states of Kansas, Nebraska, North and South Dakota, Colorado, Wyoming, and Montana. Pius IX named John Miège from St. Louis as the vicar apostolic. Four years later, in 1854, the US Congress created the Nebraska Territory, a vast area covering six future states.

The first Catholic parish in the Lincoln area was St. Benedict's, erected in 1856. It is the oldest parish in Nebraska. In 1857, Pius IX suppressed the Vicariate of the Indian Territory, creating instead the Vicariate Apostolic of Kansas, which included all of Nebraska.Pius IX appointed Miège as vicar of the new vicariate.

=== 1862 to 1887 ===
In 1862, Pastor Emmanuel Hartig dedicated St. Benedict's Church in Nebraska City, the oldest standing church in the state. During the American Civil War, Irish Catholic workers moved to Nebraska to transport goods for the war effort. They later built the Union Pacific railroad through the area. Nebraska was admitted as a state in 1867.

By the 1870s, large numbers of German and Czech Catholic immigrants were settling on farms in the region. The second apostolic vicar of Nebraska was James O'Connor, named by Pius IX in 1876. On August 2, 1885, the Vatican elevated the Apostolic Vicariate of Nebraska to the Diocese of Omaha.

=== 1887 to 1900 ===
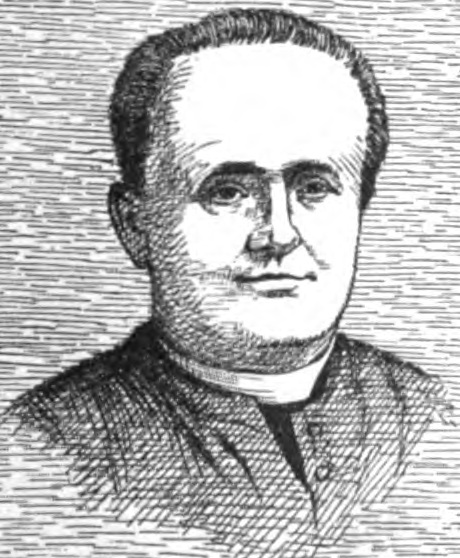
Bishop Bonacum (1886)

The Diocese of Lincoln was established on August 2, 1887, by Pope Leo XIII with territory taken from the Diocese of Omaha. He appointed Thomas Bonacum of St. Louis as the first bishop of Lincoln.

When Bonacum became bishop in 1888, the diocese had a Catholic population of 23,000 with 32 priests, 29 parishes, and three parochial schools. In 1888, Bonacum sued Patrick Egan, a prominent Lincoln citizen, for failing to pay a money pledge for St. Teresa's Pro-Cathedral. The case went to the Nebraska Supreme Court, which ordered Egan to pay the pledge.In 1889, the Sisters of St. Francis of Perpetual Adoration opened St. Elizabeth Hospital in Lincoln. It is today CHI Health St. Elizabeth.

In 1891, Bonacum brought the priest Martin Corbett of Palmyra before a diocesan court of five other priests. Bonacum and Corbett had undergone a series of disputes, leading to the court battle. The court dismissed the charges against Corbett. Bonacum then tried to force Corbett to resign his position in 1894. Corbett refused and later sued Bonacum in civil court for libel. The case was dismissed. Bonacum became the first Catholic bishop in the United States to be sued in civil court.

=== 1900 to 1957 ===
By the time of Bonacum's death in 1911, the diocese had a Catholic population of 37,000 with 84 priests, 135 churches and 65 with resident pastors, and 28 parochial schools. Later that year, John Tihen of St. Louis was appointed the second bishop of Lincoln. In December 2011, Tihen consecrated the Cathedral of Our Lady of the Immaculate Conception in LincolnTihen was appointed bishop of the Diocese of Denver in 1917.

Bishop Charles O'Reilly from the Diocese of Baker City was named the third bishop of Lincoln in 1918 by Pope Benedict XV. Early into his tenure at Lincoln, O'Reilly had to contend with the 1918 influenza pandemic, which claimed the lives of many priests and religious sisters in the diocese. He traveled to Rome in 1921 to recruit more priests, especially for the large Czech-speaking population in the diocese. During his five years as bishop, he established six new parochial schools and three new parishes.

After O'Reilly died in 1923, Pope Pius XI named Francis Beckman of the Archdiocese of Cincinnati as his replacement. In 1930, Beckman was named archbishop of the Archdiocese of Dubuque. His successor in Lincoln was Louis Kucera of Dubuque. Kucera served as bishop for 27 years until his death in 1957. Auxiliary Bishop James Casey of Lincoln succeeded Kucera that same year.

=== 1957 to 2000 ===
Casey built a chancery building in 1961 and the Our Lady of Good Counsel Retreat House in Waverly in 1963.He also constructed the Villa Marie School in Lincoln for special needs children, several high schools and grade schools, and a Newman Center. The most prominent development was the erection of the Cathedral of the Risen Christ in Lincoln; Casey broke ground on the new cathedral in June 1963 and dedicated it in August 1965. The Southern Nebraska Register declared that Casey "accomplished more for the Diocese of Lincoln in 10 years than any other comparable period in our history."

Priest James Benton was accused in 1997 of sexually touching a minor in the 1980s. The diocese did not investigate Benton, even after the victim met with Bruskewitz in 2002. The diocese allowed Benton to hold pastoral assignments until another allegation was made against him in 2017.

Casey was appointed archbishop of the Archdiocese of Denver in 1967; Auxiliary Bishop Glennon Flavin of St. Louis replaced him in Lincoln. Flavin founded the School Sisters of Christ the King in 1976. In 1981, Flavin prohibited women from serving as lectors during mass; in response, Archbishop Rembert Weakland called his actions "a step backward and offensive." Flavin retired in 1992 after 24 years as bishop of Lincoln.

To replace Flavin, Pope John Paul II selected Fabian Bruskewitz of the Archdiocese of Milwaukee in 1992. In 1996, Bruskewitz issued a statement forbidding Catholics in the diocese to join a number of organizations, including the Society of St. Pius X, Call to Action, Planned Parenthood, Catholics for Choice, the Hemlock Society, and various Masonic groups, under pain of excommunication.

In 1996, Bishop Fabian Bruskewitz established a task force to examine the idea of creating a seminary in the diocese. In 1998, St. Gregory the Great Seminary was opened in Seward.

=== 2000 to present ===
In 2006, Bruskewitz rejected the proposed undertaking of an audit by the National Review Board of the United States Conference of Catholic Bishops. The audit would have examined whether the diocese had effectively implemented national guidelines on sexual abuse programs. Bruskewitz retired as bishop of Lincoln in 2010. James D. Conley, formerly an auxiliary bishop from the Archdiocese of Denver, was appointed bishop by Pope Benedict XVI in 2012.

In June 2014, the chairman of the U.S. Conference of Catholic Bishops (USCCB) National Review Board for the Protection of Children reported that the Diocese of Lincoln was one of four American dioceses not in audit compliance. According to a 2015 statement by Conley, the diocese had complied with all church and civil laws on child abuse reporting and child protection; he stated that the audit process had been improved, and that the diocese would now participate in the USCCB audit.

In 2016, Conley gave permission for lay married men to enter the permanent diaconate in cooperation with the Archdiocese of Omaha's diaconate program. In early 2019, Conley reiterated diocesan policy of only allowing male altar servers, making it one of two dioceses in the country with that restriction.

In December 2019, Conley announced that he was taking a medical leave of absence to treat depression, anxiety, insomnia, and tinnitus. Archbishop George Joseph Lucas was appointed to serve as apostolic administrator during Conley's leave of absence. Conley returned to active service in November 2020.

In May 2021, Matthew Hecker became the first permanent deacon to be ordained for the diocese. In October, the diocese published a list of clergy, including Copenhaver and Benton, with credible accusations of sexual abuse of minors. In November, Nebraska Attorney General Doug Peterson published a report on sexual misconduct by clergy in Nebraska. It highlighted several instances since the early 1990s in which Bishop Bruskewitz did not follow canon law in handling allegations. In August 2025, the University of Nebraska, Lincoln apologized for a drag performance on campus that contains elements of the Catholic mass. Conley called the event "a blatant public display of faith-based discrimination". Conley in May 2026 announced that the diocese was opening Mater Filius, a maternity home in Lincoln for pregnant women in need of support.

== Coat of arms ==
Coat of arms of Catholic Diocese of Lincoln
Escutcheon Argent, a pales gules; on a chief azure a star of six points argent Symbolism The arms are a simplified version of the arms of the United States, in honor of Abraham Lincoln preserving the Union.

== Bishops ==
=== Bishops of Lincoln ===
1. Thomas Bonacum (1887–1911)
2. John Henry Tihen (1911–1917), appointed Bishop of Denver
3. Charles Joseph O'Reilly (1918–1923)
4. Francis Beckman (1924–1930), appointed Archbishop of Dubuque
5. Louis Benedict Kucera (1930–1957)
6. James Vincent Casey (1957-1967), formerly auxiliary bishop, appointed Archbishop of Denver
7. Glennon Patrick Flavin (1967–1992)
8. Fabian Bruskewitz (1992–2012)
9. James D. Conley (2012–present)

=== Diocesan priests who became bishops elsewhere ===
- Robert F. Vasa, appointed Bishop of Baker in 1999 and later Bishop of Santa Rosa in California
- Thomas Olmsted, appointed Coadjutor Bishop (in 1999) and later Bishop of Wichita and Bishop of Phoenix
- Michael Owen Jackels, appointed Bishop of Wichita in 2005 and later Archbishop of Dubuque
- John Folda, appointed Bishop of Fargo in 2013

== Schools ==
As of 2025, the Diocese of Lincoln was operating 27 schools with an approximate enrollment of 7600 students.

=== Secondary Schools ===
- Aquinas Catholic Middle and High School, David City
- Bishop Neumann Jr/Sr High School, Wahoo
- Hastings Catholic Schools, Hastings
- Lourdes Central Catholic, Nebraska City
- Pius X Catholic High School, Lincoln
- Sacred Heart School, Falls City (K through 12)

=== Seminary ===
- St. Gregory the Great Seminary, Seward
- Our Lady of Guadalupe Seminary, Denton
