= Lourdes Central Catholic School =

Location
- 412 Second Avenue; Nebraska City, (Otoe County), Nebraska 68410; United States
- Coordinates: 40°40′43″N 95°51′1″W

Information
- Type: Private, coeducational
- Motto: "Tradition of Excellence"
- Religious affiliation: Roman Catholic
- Superintendent: Fr. Jonathan Haschke
- Principal: Jon Borer
- Grades: K–12
- Student to teacher ratio: 1:20
- Hours in school day: 7 1/2
- Colors: Royal blue and white
- Song: "Notre Dame Victory March"
- Athletics: Football, volleyball, men's and women's basketball, and track
- Athletics conference: Pioneer Conference
- Team name: Knights
- Tuition: $850 - $2000
- Activities Director: Kris Lien
- Website: lourdescentralcatholic.org

Lourdes Central Catholic School is a private, Roman Catholic pre-kindergarten through 12th Grade school in Nebraska City, Nebraska. It is located in the Roman Catholic Diocese of Lincoln and is the consolidated school of nine Catholic parishes in Nebraska City, Paul, Julian, Syracuse, Peru, Auburn, Avoca, and Plattsmouth.

== History ==
Saint Benedict's Parish in Nebraska City founded Saint Benedict's Parochial School in 1861, with the assistance of the Benedictine Sisters of Pennsylvania. In 1865 Annunciation Academy, a girls' school, was founded and in 1880 Saint Mary's School. Falling enrollment led to the closure of Saint Mary's in 1891, with the building being sold to the Nebraska City Public Library Committee, and in 1908 Annunciation Academy closed because of insufficient funds to repair the building. The following year Saint Bernard's Academy was opened in the former home of a local judge, William Hayward. It was coeducational, with boarding facilities for girls, and was operated by the Bernadine Madames of Ollignies, Belgium, until 1920, when the Ursuline Sisters of Kentucky replaced them after passage of a state law disqualifying non-citizens from teaching in schools. In 1927, the Ursulines took over Saint Benedict's also, and that school moved into a new building in 1951.

Lourdes Central Catholic School was later built to house the high school students from Saint Mary's, Saint Benedict's, and the parishes in Julian, Paul, and Dunbar, and a new Saint Mary's School, an elementary school, was subsequently attached to it. The two Nebraska City parishes consolidated their elementary schools in 1963, dividing the grades between the two buildings, and the high school became a junior-senior high school in 1966.
