= Leo Joseph Brust =

American Roman Catholic bishop

Most Reverend Leo Joseph Brust
- Auxiliary Bishop of Milwaukee
- In office: August 22, 1969 - April 16, 1991

Orders
- Ordination: May 30, 1942
- Consecration: October 16, 1969

Personal details
- Born: January 7, 1916 St. Francis, Wisconsin
- Died: January 31, 1995 (aged 79) Milwaukee, Wisconsin
- Denomination: Catholic Church

Leo Joseph Brust (January 7, 1916 – January 31, 1995) was the Roman Catholic titular bishop of Suelli who served as an auxiliary bishop of the Roman Catholic Archdiocese of Milwaukee.

== Biography ==
Born in St. Francis, Wisconsin, Brust was ordained to the priesthood on May 30, 1942.

In 1964, in his role as chancellor for the Archdiocese of Milwaukee, Monsignor Brust opposed efforts led by Milwaukee’s black community to integrate the school system by enforcing an order to keep Catholic parishes and schools from participating in a school boycott and then later prohibiting Fr. James Groppi and Fr. William Whelan from participating in the boycott.

On August 22, 1969, Pope Paul VI appointed Brust auxiliary bishop and he was consecrated on October 16, 1969.

Bishop Brust retired on April 16, 1991.

== Notes ==
Catholic Church titles
Preceded by –	Auxiliary Bishop of Milwaukee; 1969–1991	Succeeded by –
