= The Catholic Hour (TV series) =

American television series

The Catholic Hour is a 60-minute American television drama anthology series produced by the National Broadcasting Company (NBC) and the National Council of Catholic Men. It premiered on October 1, 1951, and ran until 1967.

Among its writers were Rod Serling and James Costigan. Guest stars included Martin Sheen, Mildred Dunnock, Edward Mulhare, Eugene Roche, and Michael Constantine.

The series's first color broadcast occurred on Easter Sunday in 1954.

Effective January 5, 1969, the program was renamed Guideline.

== Episodes ==
The Catholic Hour sometimes presented episodes in multi-part series. They included

- August 1955 - contemporary Catholic authors - four parts
- January 1958 - "Rome Eternal" - four parts.
- August 1961 - "England Revisited" - four parts

== Critical response ==
The trade publication Broadcasting wrote that two episodes featuring contemporary Catholic authors' works in August 1955 could serve as models for other religious programs. The review said that the first broadcast "was beautifully done", while the second failed to reach that level. It pointed out the lack of any "involved pitch for the church or any arm thereof" while the broadcasts were entertaining and presented ideas for viewers to accept or reject.

A review in The New York Times praised the January 5, 1958, episode as "a compelling excursion into history". The review cited "excellent camera work, an informative script ... and a stirring musical score".
