= Cathedral of the Risen Christ (Lincoln, Nebraska) =

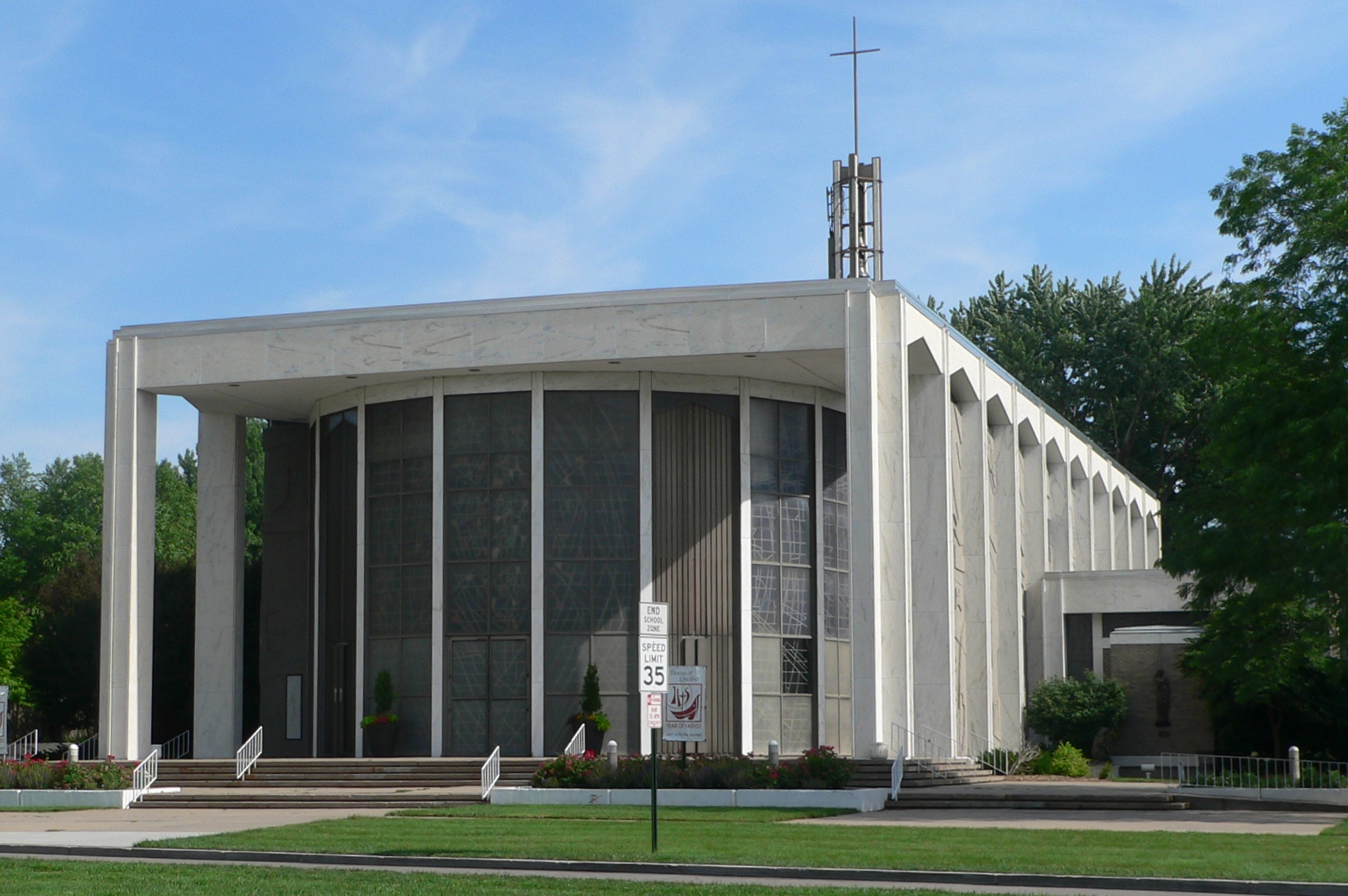
- Cathedral of the Risen Christ
- 40°46′49″N 96°40′13″W
- Location: 3500 Sheridan Boulevard; Lincoln, Nebraska
- Country: United States
- Denomination: Roman Catholic
- Website: www.cathedraloftherisenchrist.org

History
- Status: Cathedral
- Founded: 1926
- Dedication: Resurrection

Architecture
- Architect: Leo A. Daly
- Style: Modern
- Completed: 1965

Administration
- Diocese: Diocese of Lincoln
- Deanery: Lincoln

Clergy
- Bishop: Most Rev. James D. Conley
- Rector: Msgr. Thomas Fucinaro

The Cathedral of the Risen Christ is the mother church of the Roman Catholic Diocese of Lincoln, Nebraska, United States.

The cathedral parish traces its roots back to Holy Family Church, a parish founded in 1926 and organized in 1932. On June 20, 1963, the construction was begun on Cathedral of the Risen Christ. The new cathedral was dedicated on August 18, 1965.

Eucharistic adoration has continued in the cathedral parish perpetually since October 1, 1959.

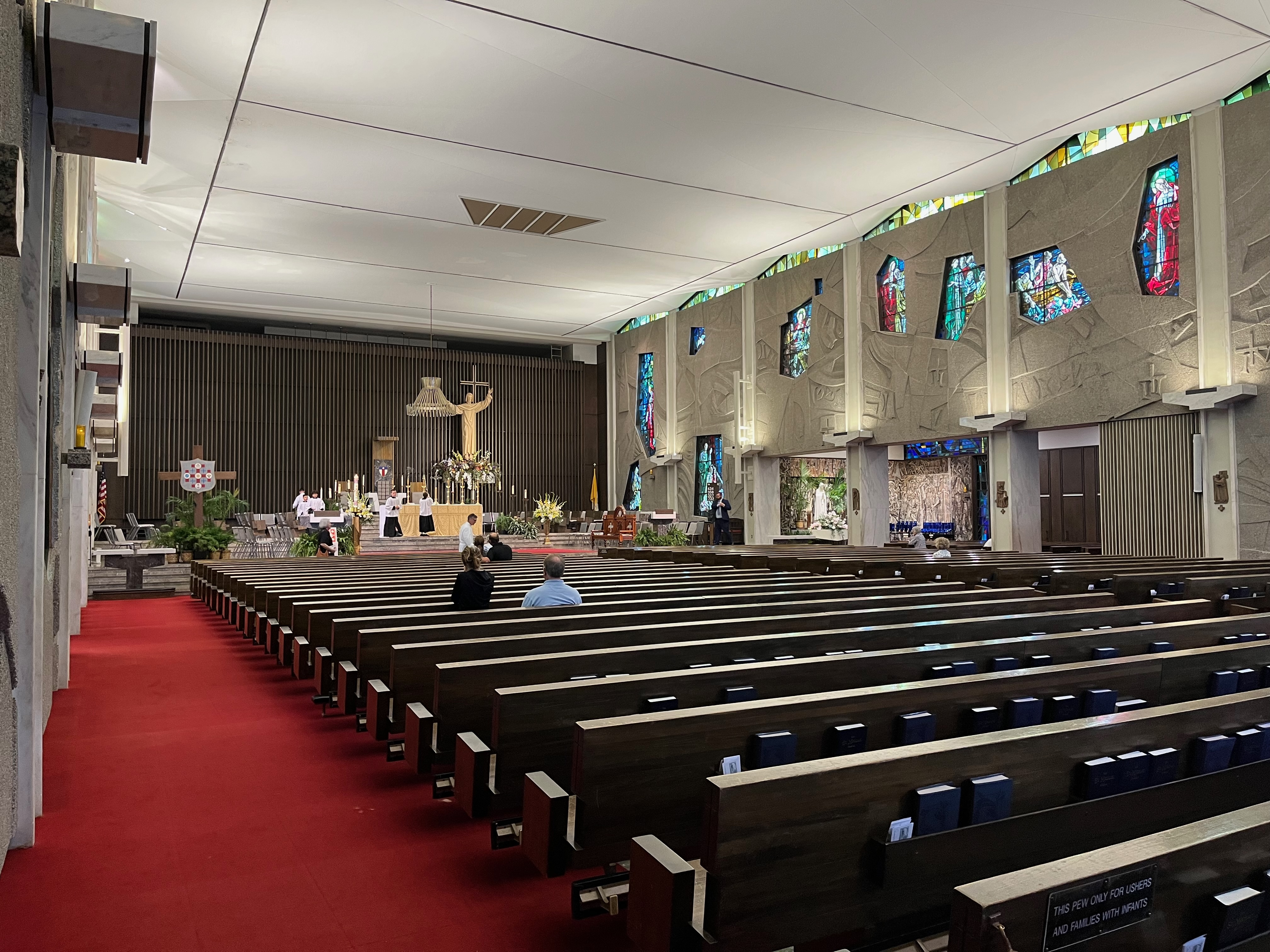
View toward the altar

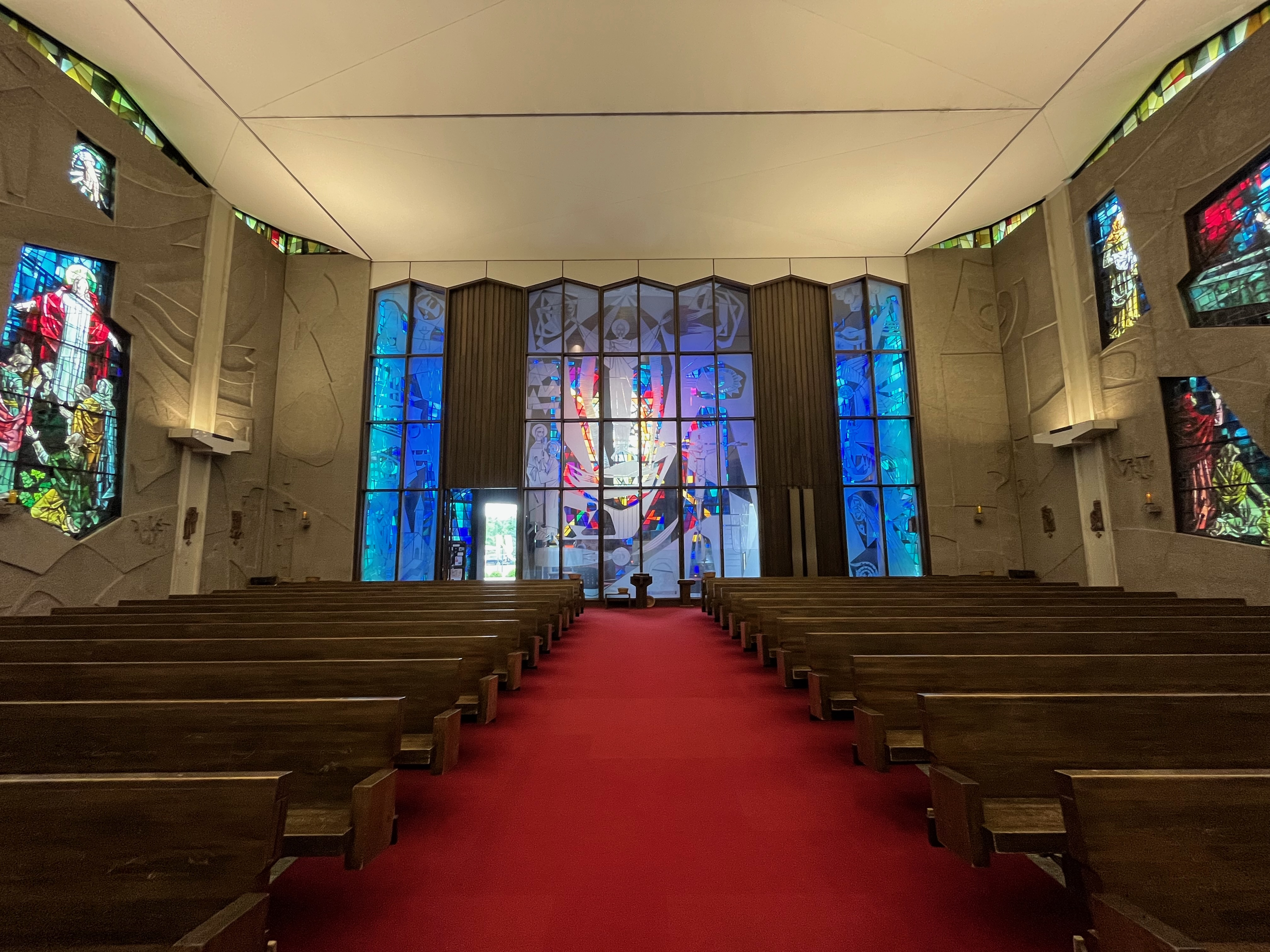
View toward the entrance

== See also ==
- List of Catholic cathedrals in the United States
- List of cathedrals in the United States
