= Henry Rohlman =

German-born prelate (1876–1957)

His Excellency, The Most Reverend Henry Patrick Rohlman D.D.
- Archbishop of Dubuque; Titular Archbishop of Cotrada
- See: Archdiocese of Dubuque
- Appointed: June 15, 1944
- In office: November 11, 1946 – December 2, 1954
- Predecessor: Francis Beckman
- Successor: Leo Binz
- Previous posts: Bishop of Davenport; 1926 to 1944; Coadjutor Archbishop of Dubuque; 1944 to 1946

Orders
- Ordination: December 21, 1901 by Paul Bruchesi
- Consecration: July 25, 1927 by James Keane

Personal details
- Born: March 17, 1876 Appelhuelsen Westphalia, Kingdom of Prussia (now Germany)
- Died: September 13, 1957 (aged 81) Dubuque, Iowa, US
- Education: Columbia College; Grand Seminary of Montreal; Catholic University of America
- Motto: Vita Jesu manifestetur (Let the life of Jesus be revealed)

Henry Patrick Rohlman baptized as Bernard Heinrich Rohlmann (March 16, 1876 – September 13, 1957) was a German-born prelate of the Roman Catholic Church. He served as bishop of the Diocese of Davenport in Iowa from 1927 to 1944 and as coadjutor archbishop and archbishop of the Archdiocese of Dubuque in Iowa from 1944 to 1954.

== Biography ==
=== Early life ===
Rohlman was born on March 16, 1876, in Appelhuelsen, Westphalia in the Kingdom of Prussia (present day Germany), to Bernard and Bernadine (Huesmann) Rohlmann. When he was two years old, the Rohlmann family immigrated to the United States, settling in Carroll County, Iowa. They moved to Arkansas, where both of his parents died. Henry was then sent to Nebraska, where he finished elementary school and worked on a farm.

With financial assistance from the people from Carroll County, Rohlman was able to study in the high school department at St. Lawrence Seminary in Mount Calvary, Wisconsin. Rohlman then graduated from Columbia College in Dubuque, Iowa. He later entered the Grand Seminary of Montreal in Montreal, Quebec.

=== Priesthood ===
Rohlman was ordained a priest by Archbishop Paul Bruchesi in Montreal for the Archdiocese of Dubuque on December 21, 1901.

Rohlman engaged in pastoral work in Dubuque before attending the Catholic University of America in Washington, D.C., with a view to becoming a missionary. When he returned to Dubuque, the archdiocese assigned him to the apostolate, which preached parish missions in the archdiocese and elsewhere in Iowa. He was later appointed pastor at St. Mary's Parish in Waterloo, Iowa, then became business manager at Columbia College. In the early 1920s, the archdiocese assigned Rohlman to form Nativity Parish in Dubuque.

Ordination history of Henry Rohlman
History
Episcopal consecration
- Consecrated by: James Keane (Dubuque)
- Date: July 25, 1927
Episcopal succession
Bishops consecrated by Henry Rohlman as principal consecrator
- Edward Aloysius Fitzgerald: September 12, 1946

=== Bishop of Davenport ===
On May 20, 1927, Pope Pius XI named Rohlman the fourth bishop of Davenport. Rohlman was consecrated by Archbishop James Keane of Dubuque in St. Raphael's Cathedral in Dubuque on July 25, 1927. He was installed the next day as bishop in Sacred Heart Cathedral in Davenport, Iowa. The principal co-consecrators were Bishops Edmond Heelan of Sioux City and Thomas Drumm of Des Moines.

In 1928, Rohlman commissioned a study to assess the social problems in the diocese. The result of this study was the establishment of a local branch of Catholic Charities in 1929. He named Reverend Martin Cone as its first director. Its immediate focus was the welfare of the children at St. Vincent's Home in Davenport.

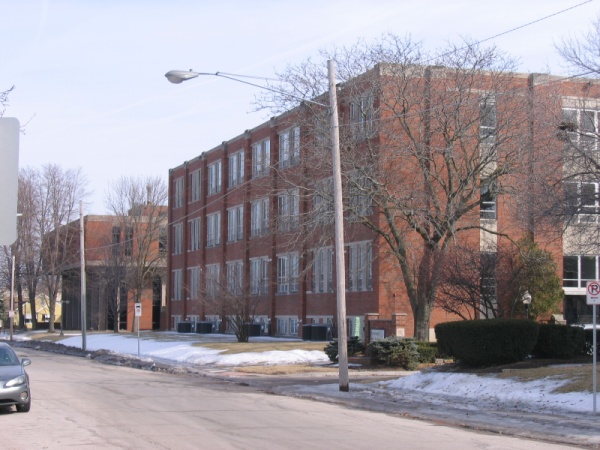
Marycrest College, Davenport, Iowa (2008)

Two colleges for women were started in the diocese during Rohlman's episcopate. The Sisters of St. Francis in Clinton, Iowa, established Mount St. Clare College (later Ashford University) in 1928. It was an extension of their academy, which had been established in the 1890s. St. Ambrose College in Davenport inaugurated a woman's division in 1934 and continued to support it as it searched for a religious order of women to take it over. In 1937, property was secured for a woman's college in Davenport on the west side of the city. The Congregation of the Humility of Mary, at Rohlman's urging, established Marycrest College in 1939 from the woman's division of St. Ambrose.

The diocese celebrated its Golden Jubilee in 1931. The next year Rohlman convoked the diocese's third synod. The synod was called to bring the diocese's regulations in line with the Code of Canon Law that had been promulgated by the Vatican in 1917. The synod set the salary for pastors at $1,000 per year, plus household expenses, with associate pastors and chaplain's salaries receiving $500 per year. Catholic Charities had set up their offices in the Kahl Building in Davenport They were joined in 1932 with the chancery and the newly established superintendent of schools. All of these offices and the bishop's office moved into a property on Church Square behind St. Anthony's Church downtown. It was renamed the Cosgrove Building after Davenport's second bishop, Henry Cosgrove.

Rohlman led the diocese through the Great Depression of the 1930s and World War II in the 1940s. The Catholic Messenger, an independent Catholic newspaper published in Davenport, was experiencing financial problems during the depression; the diocese purchased it use as its newspaper in 1937.

Until Rohlman came to the diocese, only five priests had been recognized for their contributions to the church by being given a papal honor, all of them from Bishop Davis. Rohlman named monsignors every two years. By the time he returned to Dubuque, 25 priests had been honored and five were recognized twice.

=== Coadjutor Archbishop and Archbishop of Dubuque ===
During the early 1940s, Archbishop Francis Beckman of Dubuque had involved the archdiocese in a dubious financial scheme. Beckman had been talked into investing borrowed money in gold mines. However, the scheme was soon revealed to be a fraud. Because Beckman had signed promissory notes in the archdiocese's name, it led to a $600,000 loss for the archdiocese when the holders of the notes began demanding repayment.

Because of the financial problems surrounding Beckman, Pope Pius XII on June 15, 1944, appointed Rohlman as titular archbishop of Macra and coadjutor archbishop of Dubuque. The Vatican told Beckman that while he was archbishop of Dubuque, Rohlman was running the archdiocese. On November 11, 1946, Beckman retired as archbishop of Dubuque and Rohlman automatically succeeded him.

While Rohlman was archbishop, Christ the King Chapel was constructed at Loras College in Dubuque and St. Mary's Home for Children was built in Dubuque. The number of priests in the archdiocese rose from 290 to 345. Rohlman, along with the other bishops in Iowa, re-established Mount St Bernard's Seminary for the education of new priests in the province. A new $2.5 million building was constructed to house the seminary in Dubuque.

On August 10, 1945, the Diocese of Omaha was elevated to an archdiocese. At that time the province of Dubuque was reduced in size to the four dioceses in Iowa.On August 3, 1946, Pope Pius XII appointed a Dubuque priest, Reverend Edward Fitzgerald, as the first auxiliary bishop in the archdiocese. He assisted Rohlman until he was appointed bishop of Winona on October 20, 1949. In 1949, Rohlman requested a coadjutor archbishop. The Vatican appointed Bishop Leo Binz of Winona to the post.

== Retirement and legacy ==
Rohlman's resignation as archbishop of Dubuque was accepted by Pius XII on December 2, 1954. The pope named Rohlman as titular archbishop of Cotrada. Henry Rohlman died on September 13, 1957, at age 81 in Dubuque.

The following places were named after Rohlman:

- Rohlman Hall at Loras College
- Rohlman Hall at St. Ambrose University
- Rohlman Hall in the Marycrest College Historical District in Davenport
Rohlman Halls

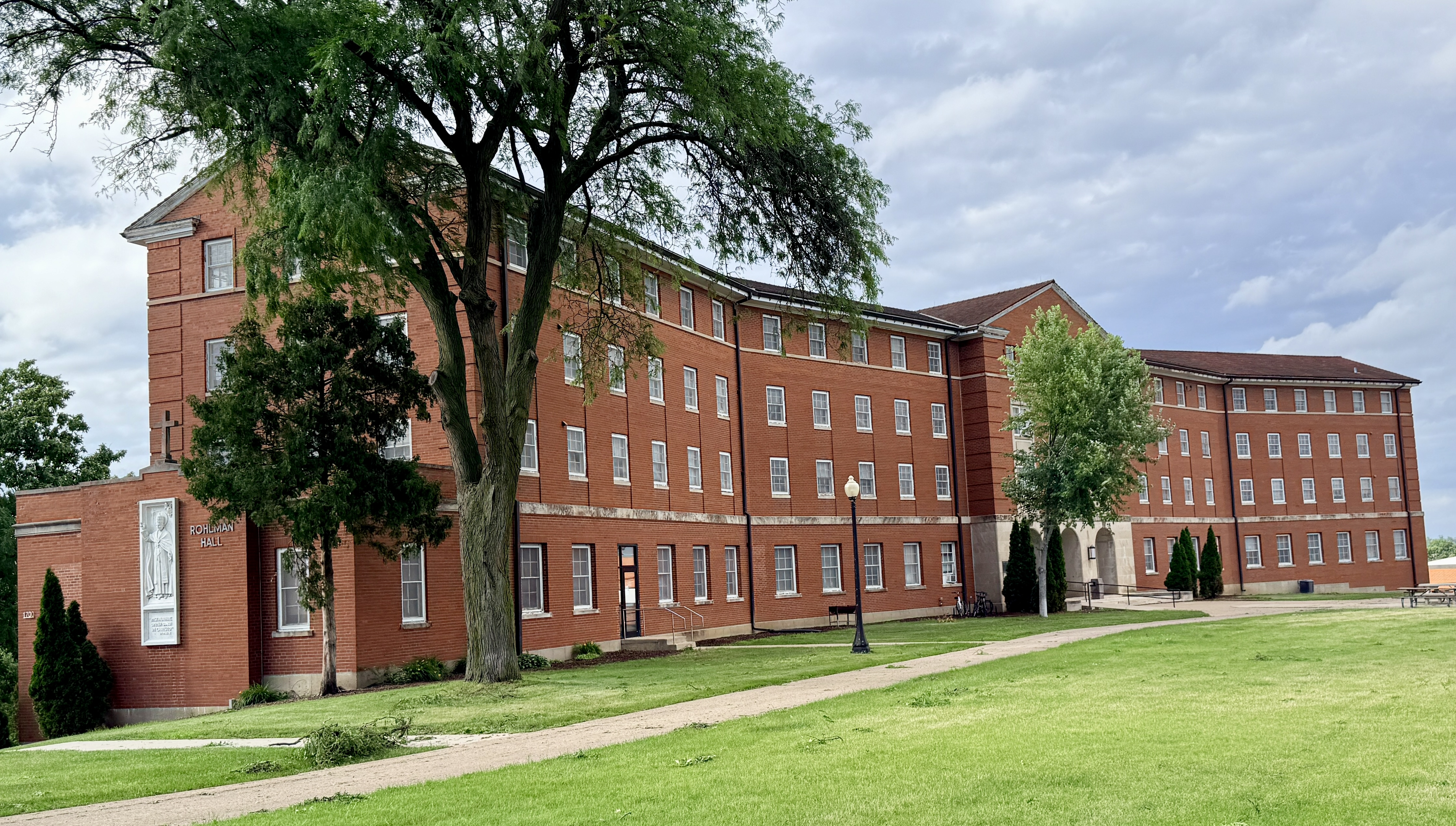
Loras College

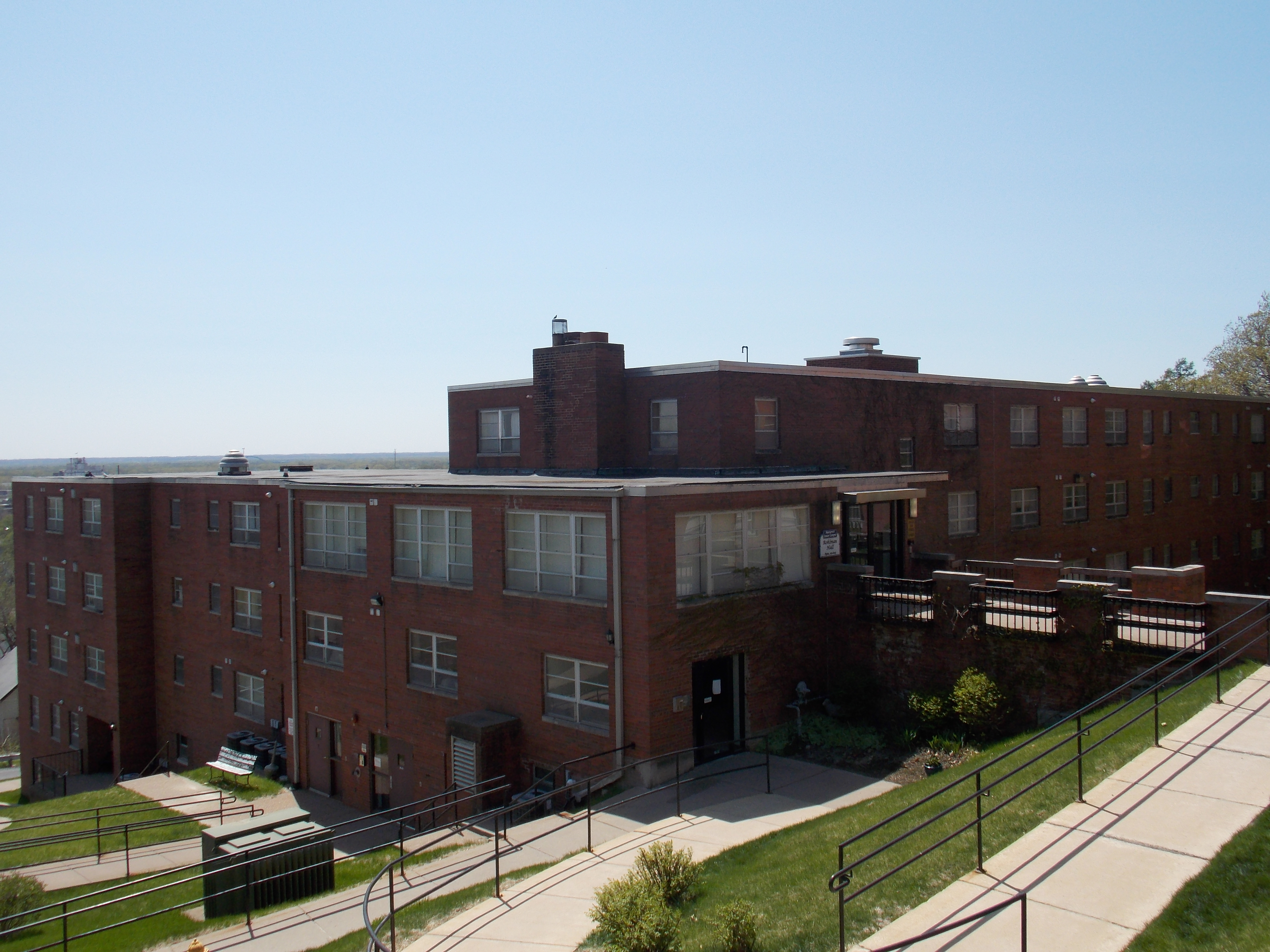
Marycrest College

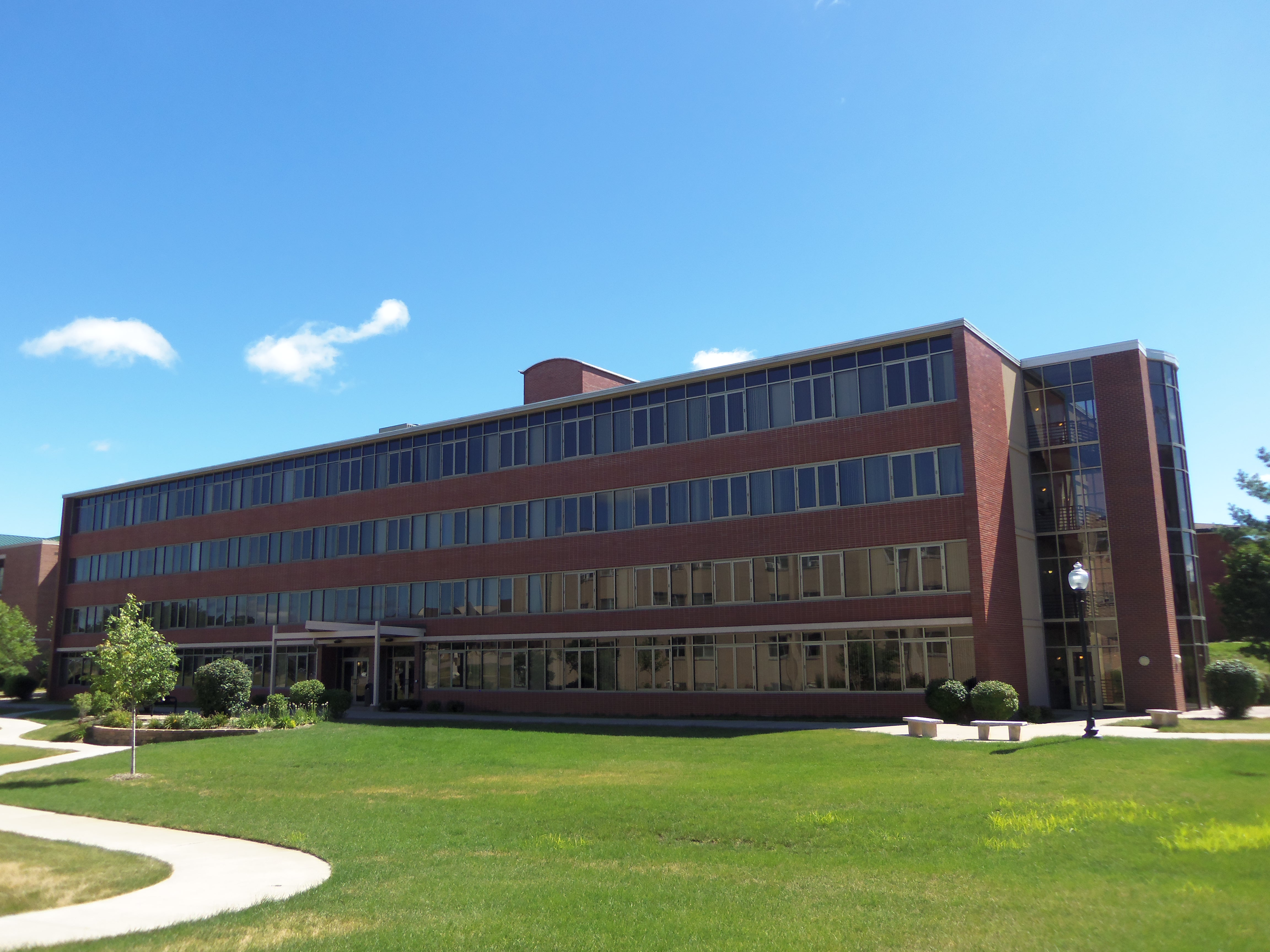
St. Ambrose University

Catholic Church titles
Preceded by James J. Davis	Bishop of Davenport; 1927–1944	Succeeded by Ralph Leo Hayes
