= Aloysius Schulte =

American Catholic academic

The Reverend Msgr A. J. Schulte
- Born: 1858; Fort Madison, Iowa, USA
- Died: January 17, 1940 (aged 81–82); Iowa City, Iowa, US
- Known for: 1st President of St. Ambrose University, Davenport, Iowa

Aloysius Joseph Schulte (1858–1940) was an American Catholic priest and academic who served as the first president of St. Ambrose College in Davenport, Iowa, from 1882 to 1891.

== Biography ==
Schulte was born in Fort Madison, Iowa. He received his classical education from St. Francis Seminary in Milwaukee, and studied for the priesthood at St. John's University in Collegeville, Minnesota. He was ordained a priest on December 28, 1881, by Bishop John McMullen, first bishop of the Diocese of Davenport, at St. Margaret's Cathedral. He was the first priest ordained for the diocese.

After ordination Schulte worked as a cathedral assistant before he was slated by McMullen to organize St. Ambrose College. The school had 40 high school students during the first year, and 85 students when he left. In addition to his administrative responsibilities he taught Latin, German and rhetoric. During Schulte's presidency, the central portion of Ambrose Hall was built. In 1889 he was appointed to a committee to promote and ensure quality education in the schools of the diocese by Bishop Henry Cosgrove.

After leaving St. Ambrose College, Schulte took a pastorate at St. Mary's Church in Iowa City. He would spend nearly 50 years as pastor of St. Mary's during which time many expansion and improvement projects were undertaken. He also focused his attention on the parish school. At the very beginning of his pastorate the present rectory was built in 1892. The same year he purchased property for a new school and the new building was built the following year. High school grades were added to the school in 1897, and Schulte saw to it that the school was accredited by the State University of Iowa. It was the first Catholic high school is the state to receive the accreditation. The church was renovated and redecorated from 1907 to 1908. An addition was built on to the school in 1911, which included an auditorium and cafeteria, and a new convent was built for the Sisters who taught in the school in 1926.

Bishop Henry Rohlman nominated Schulte for papal honors twice. In 1927 Pope Pius XI named Schulte a Domestic Prelate, and in 1931 named him a Protonotary Apostolic. Both honors allowed Schulte the use of the title Right Reverend Monsignor. Msgr. Schulte died while still pastor at St. Mary's on January 17, 1940, and was buried in St. Joseph's Cemetery in Iowa City. He was 81 years old. He does have some relatives living in Iowa today.

Academic offices
Preceded by none	President of St. Ambrose University; 1882–1891	Succeeded by John Flannagan
