= John Flannagan (priest) =

Very Rev. J.T.A. Flannagan
- Born: 1860; Haverhill, Massachusetts, USA
- Died: 1926 (aged 65–66); Davenport, Iowa, USA
- Known for: President of St. Ambrose College, Davenport, Iowa

John Thomas Aloysius Flannagan (1860–1926) was 19th and 20th century Catholic priest who served as the second president of St. Ambrose College in Davenport, Iowa from 1891 to 1906.

== Biography ==
Flannagan was born in Haverhill, Massachusetts, and was ordained a priest for the Diocese of Davenport by Bishop Henry Cosgrove in Iowa City in 1885. After ordination he was assigned to the cathedral and then became the second priest on the St. Ambrose faculty during the Rev. A.J. Schulte's duration as president. He eventually became vice president and master of discipline.

Flannagan became president of the college in 1891. While he was president of St. Ambrose his own sister, Sr. Mary Editha Flannagan, BVM, ran Immaculate Conception Academy for girls, also in Davenport. The two worked together on many events between the two schools. Flannagan promoted the boys' choir and Latin on campus. Monastic-style rules were to be observed by the students. Silence was to be maintained, except at recreation, and religion, politics and nationality were forbidden topics of conversation, Additions were made to Ambrose Hall in 1893 (east wing) and 1901 (west wing). A baseball field was constructed on campus, and football was played even though it was not considered gentlemanly. Room and board for a five-month term was $95 plus $5 for physicians care for the school year. By the end of his presidency, the school's name was officially changed from St. Ambrose Seminary to St. Ambrose College. Enrollment in the school rose slowly, but steadily, to 126 students.

Flannagan went to Sacred Heart Cathedral parish as rector after his term as president in 1906. The following year he was named vicar general of the diocese. He died in Davenport on January 26, 1926.

Academic offices
Preceded by Aloysius Schulte	President of St. Ambrose University; 1891–1906	Succeeded by William Shannahan
