= Mount Calvary Cemetery (Davenport, Iowa) =

Cemetery in Davenport, Iowa

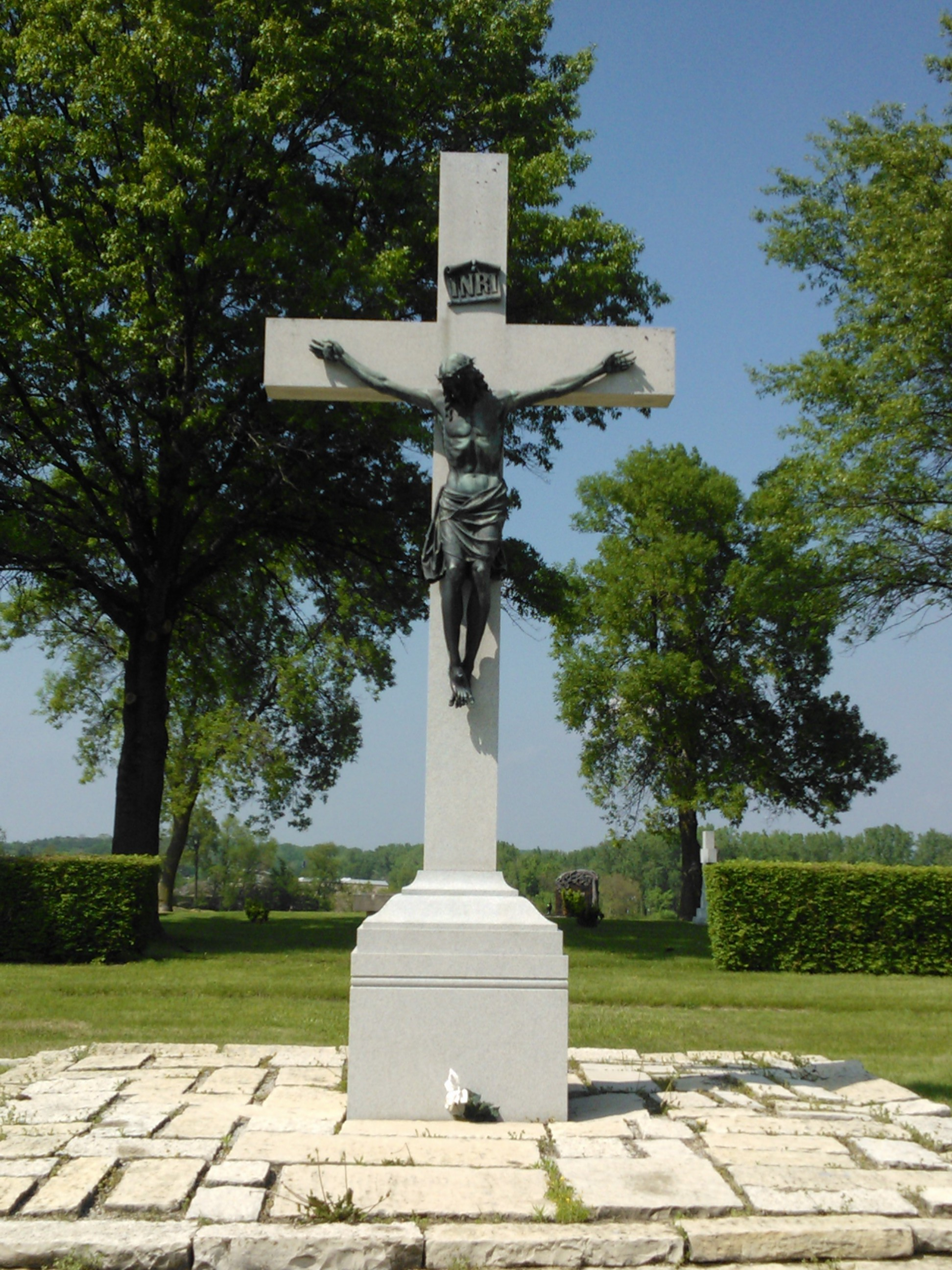
- Interactive map of Mount Calvary Cemetery

Details
- Established: 1850s
- Location: 804 E. 39th St. Davenport, Iowa
- Country: United States
- Coordinates: 41.56337°N 90.56403°W
- Type: Catholic
- Owned by: Diocese of Davenport
- Find a Grave: Mount Calvary Cemetery
- The Political Graveyard: Mount Calvary Cemetery

Mount Calvary Cemetery is located in north-central Davenport, Iowa, United States. It was established as St. Marguerite's Cemetery in the 1850s on 20 acres (8.1 ha) of property donated by Antoine LeClaire. It was officially platted by the Rev. A. Trevis, the pastor of St. Margaret's Church. At the time the cemetery lay outside the city of Davenport. Mount Calvary is in a section of the city that includes three other cemeteries: Davenport Memorial Park, Pine Hill, and Mount Nebo, which is located behind Pine Hill.

The first cemetery operated by the Catholic Church in Davenport was St. Mary's Cemetery in the west end. Bishop Mathias Loras of Dubuque bought that property on January 17, 1849, from Judge G.C.R. Mitchell for $120. The Mississippi and Missouri Railroad right of way was built through the southern section of the cemetery, and St. Mary's Church was erected on the property in 1867. Eventually the cemetery became too crowded and Holy Family Cemetery was established in the west end. St. Mary's Cemetery was discontinued and the graves were moved to either Holy Family and Mount Calvary in the early 1900s.

Mount Calvary Cemetery contains the graves of the former bishops and priests of the Diocese of Davenport that surround a crucifix in the far end of the cemetery. Three of the bishops were initially interred in Sacred Heart Cathedral before being re-interred here in 1930. It also contains sections for the Carmelite Nuns, the Congregation of the Humility of Mary, the Sisters of Charity of the Blessed Virgin Mary and the orphans from St. Vincent's Home.

== Notable burials ==
- Isabel Bloom (1908–2001), artist
- Edward Catich (1906–1979), noted calligrapher and artist
- Henry Cosgrove (1834–1906), second Bishop of Davenport, 1884–1906
- James J. Davis (1852–1926), third Bishop of Davenport, 1906–1926
- William Edwin Franklin (1930–2026), seventh Bishop of Davenport, 1993–2006
- Ralph Leo Hayes (1884–1970), fifth Bishop of Davenport, 1944–1966
- Antoine LeClaire (1797–1861), co-founder of the city of Davenport
- Johnny Lujack (1925–2023), Heisman Trophy winner
- John McMullen (1832–1882), first Bishop of Davenport, 1881–1883
- Marvin Mottet (1930–2016) social justice advocate
- Jeremiah Henry Murphy (1835–1893), Mayor of Davenport; United States House of Representatives, 1883–1887
- Gerald Francis O'Keefe (1918–2000), sixth Bishop of Davenport, 1966–1993
- Hal Skelly (1891–1934) stage and screen actor
