= James J. Davis (bishop) =

Third bishop of the Roman Catholic Diocese of Davenport, Iowa, USA

His Excellency, The Right Reverend James Joseph Davis
- Bishop of Davenport
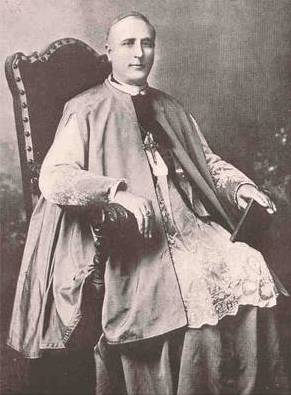
- Church: Roman Catholic Church
- Appointed: October 7, 1904 (coadjutor)
- In office: December 22, 1906 – December 2, 1926
- Predecessor: Henry Cosgrove
- Successor: Henry Rohlman
- Previous posts: Coadjutor Bishop of Davenport; 1904 to 1906

Orders
- Ordination: June 17, 1878 by James Walshe
- Consecration: November 30, 1904 by John Joseph Keane

Personal details
- Born: November 7, 1852 Tinvaum, County Kilkenny, United Kingdom of Great Britain and Ireland
- Died: December 2, 1926 (aged 74) Davenport, Iowa, US
- Education: St Patrick's, Carlow College

James Joseph Davis (November 7, 1852 – December 2, 1926) was an Irish-born prelate of the Roman Catholic Church. He served as the third bishop of the Diocese of Davenport in Iowa from 1906 to until his death in 1926.

== Biography ==
=== Early life ===
James Davis was born on November 7, 1852, in Tinvaun, County Kilkenny, United Kingdom of Great Britain and Ireland, to James and Margaret Davis. All of his siblings either entered a religious order or the priesthood. His eldest brother, Thomas, entered the Carmelites and became provincial in Ireland. Richard became a priest of the Diocese of Louisville in Kentucky. His three sisters also entered religious life. One of his sisters became the superior of Sacred Heart Convent at Sag Harbor, New York, and another, Sister Sebastian, was a member of the same order in France. A third sister, Sister Constance, became the superior of the Immaculate Conception Academy at Newport, Kentucky.

James Davis studied with the Carmelites at St. Carmel at Knocktopher, Ireland, and studied for the priesthood at St. Patrick's Ecclesiastical College in Carlow, Ireland. While in school, Davis was recruited to serve in the Diocese of Dubuque by Bishop John Hennessy.

=== Priesthood ===
==== Diocese of Dubuque ====
Davis was ordained a priest for the Diocese of Dubuque in Carlow on June 21, 1878, by Bishop James Walshe. Shortly after his ordination, he left Ireland for Dubuque, Iowa.He was assigned for a short time to St. Raphael's Cathedral, and was then assigned to St. Peter's Parish in Windham, Iowa.

==== Diocese of Davenport ====
When the Diocese of Davenport was established on May 8, 1881, Davis was serving as pastor of St. Mary's Church in Oxford, Iowa, within the boundaries of the new diocese. As a result, he was incardinated, or transferred to the new diocese.

In 1885, Davis was named pastor of St. Michael's Parish in Holbrook, Iowa and its mission in Parnell, Iowa, where Davis built a church and a school. At the time of his pastorate, St. Michael's was the largest parish in the diocese. In 1889, Davis was appointed rector of St. Margaret's Cathedral. He supervised the construction of the new Sacred Heart Cathedral in Davenport as well as the parish's new rectory. He became the vicar general of the diocese in 1895.

=== Coadjutor Bishop and Bishop of Davenport ===
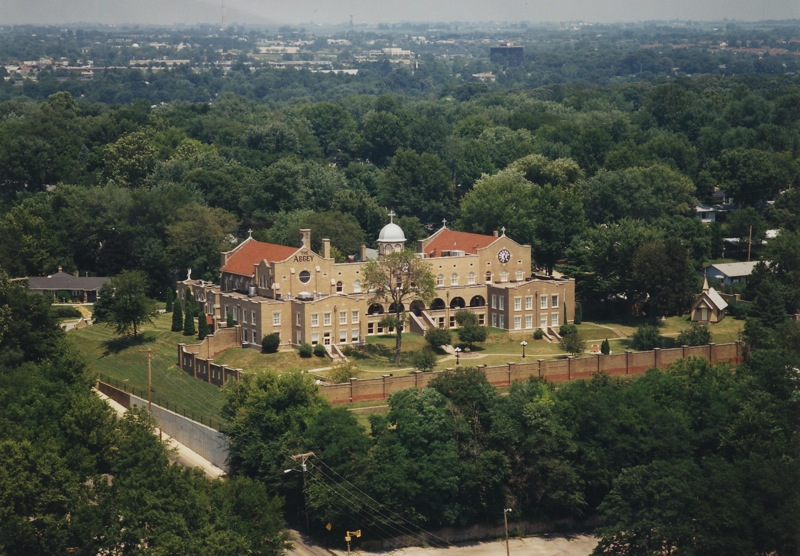
Regina Coeli Monastery. Bettendorf, Iowa (2009)

On October 7, 1904, Pope Pius X appointed Davis as titular bishop of Milopotamus and coadjutor bishop of Davenport. He was consecrated at Sacred Heart Cathedral in Davenport, Iowa, on November 30, 1904, by Archbishop John J. Keane. The principal co-consecrators were Bishops Henry Cosgrove and Mathias Lenihan. With the death of Bishop Cosgrove on December 22, 1906, Davis automatically became the new bishop.

In 1908 the Redemptorists, at Davis' invitation, established a mission house and St. Alphonsus parish in Davenport He also welcomed the Discalced Carmelites from Baltimore, who established a monastery in the diocese in 1911. Davis started standardizing parish administration. He required pastors to file annual reports that were audited and signed by two laymen. The parishes themselves were incorporated according to the laws of the State of Iowa.

On August 12, 1911, the Vatican erected the new Diocese of Des Moines from the western half of the Diocese of Davenport. Davis was named administrator of the new diocese until a bishop was named. Before the Diocese of Des Moines was established, Davis had requested that all the diocesan boundaries in Iowa be redrawn to distribute the Catholic population more evenly. If the Diocese of Davenport Diocese was simply divided in half, it would be reduced to 35,000 Catholics and the new Diocese of Des Moines would have only 25,000. In contrast, the Archdiocese of Dubuque had 109,000 Catholics and the Diocese of Sioux City had 50,000 Catholics. While the Vatican denied Davis' request for new boundaries, it did sever Clinton County from the archdiocese and give it to the Diocese of Davenport. The diocese at this time had 50,000 Catholics in a total population of 589,000.

During World War I, Davis pledged his support to US President Woodrow Wilson for the American war effort. Davis encouraged Catholic men to enlist in the military, Catholic women to support cause and vowed that members of religious orders would offer their services . Davis preached a sermon at St. Anthony's Church in Davenport on patriotism. He was quoted in the Catholic Messenger,

"It is not the flamboyant generalization of patriotism or Fourth of July oratory, but it is the patriotism that acts and responds to the call of the President. The Catholic Church teaches loyalty to the state authority, which is of God…the Catholic is the first to respond to the call of the country—the first to pay, even with his life, for what his government has given him."

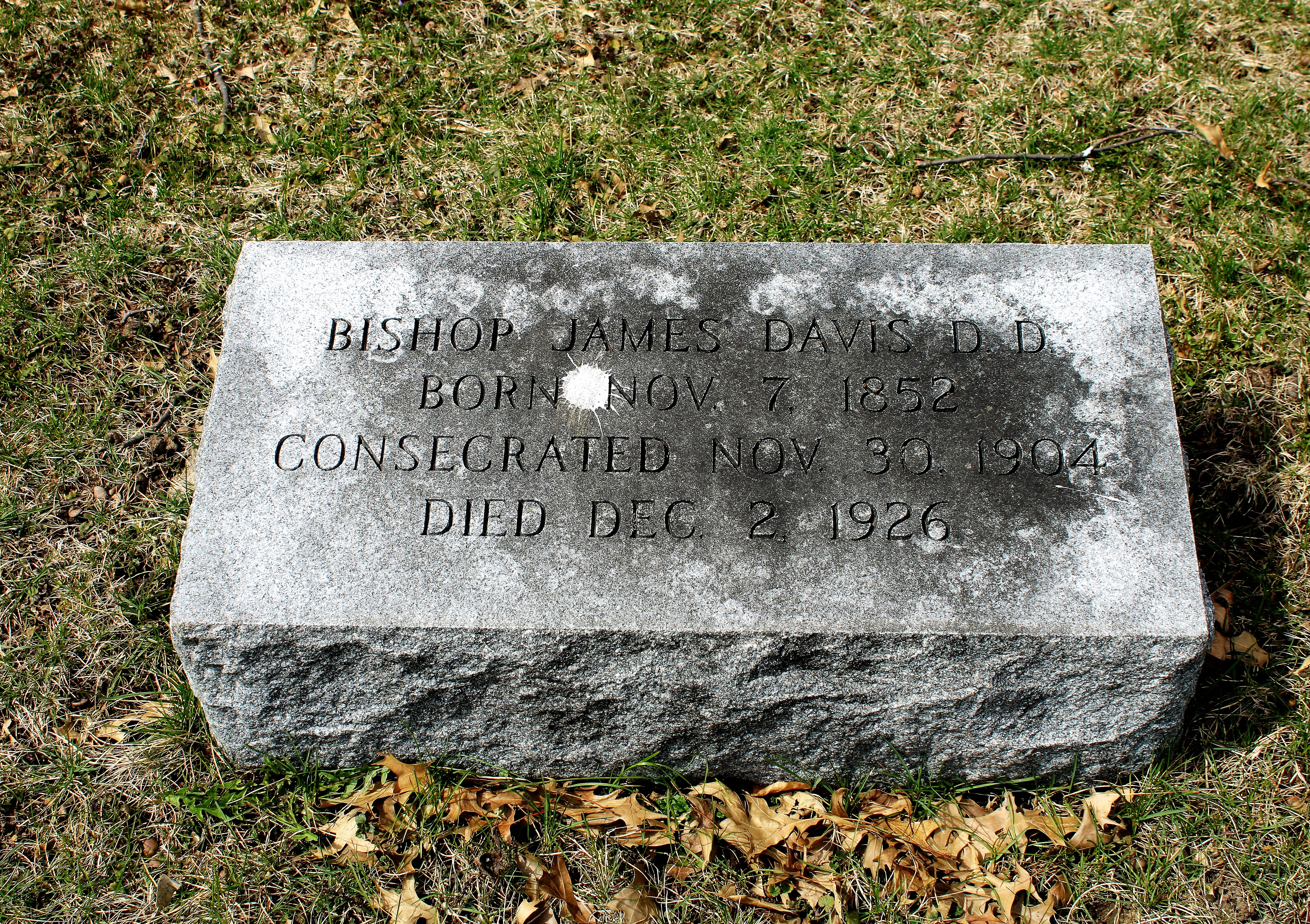
Bishop Davis' grave, Mount Calvary Cemetery, Davenport, Iowa (2022)

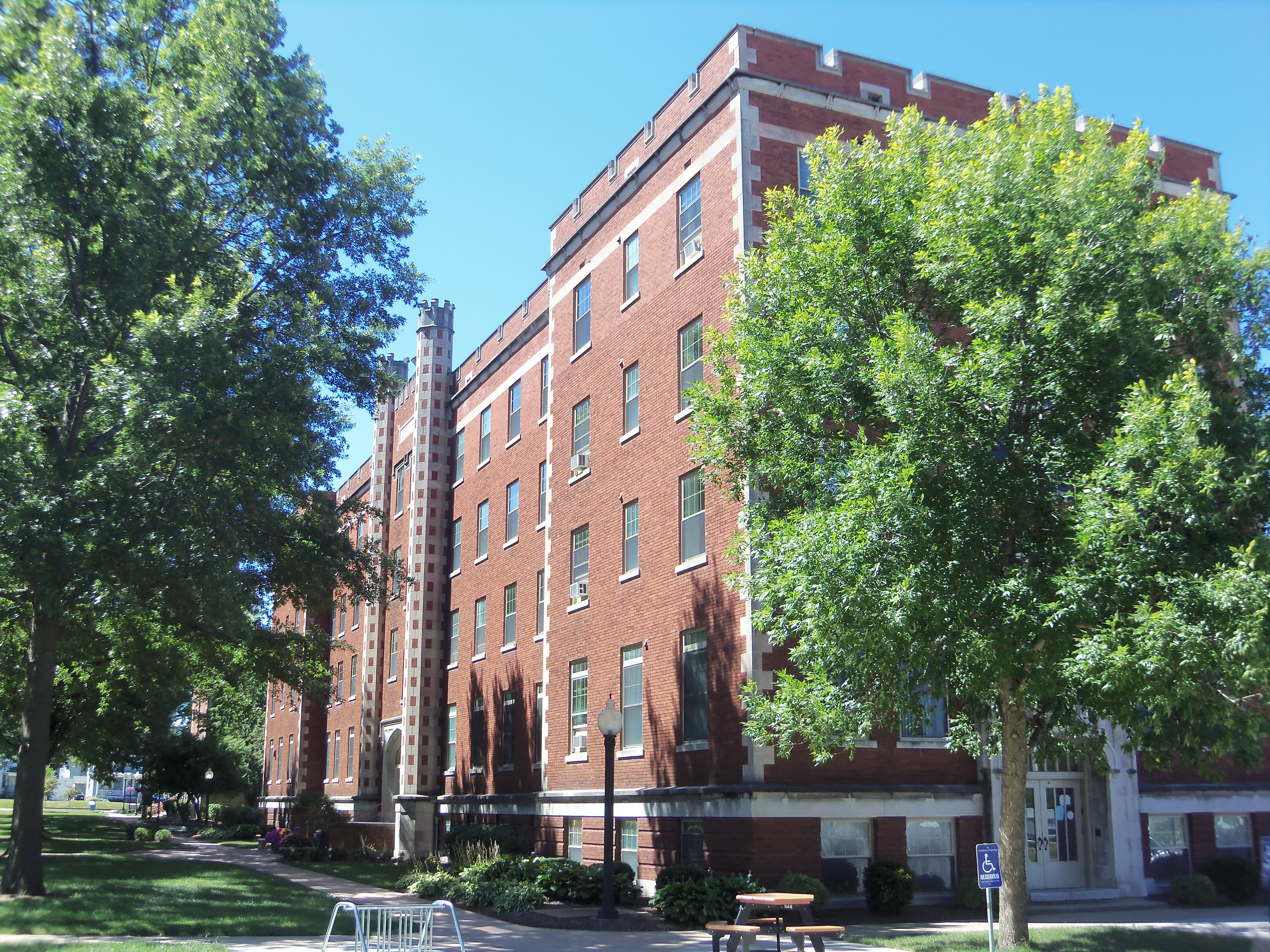
Davis Hall, St. Ambrose University, Davenport, Iowa (2013)

St. Ambrose College started enrolling women on a limited basis by admitting members of religious orders of teaching sisters in 1924. The next year the Congregation of the Humility of Mary opened St. Joseph Junior College in Ottumwa. It was the first institution of higher education for women in the diocese. The Diocesan Council of Catholic Women was also organized in 1925.

As his health declined, Davis requested that the Vatican appoint an auxiliary bishop to assist him. On December 13, 1923, Reverend Edward D. Howard was appointed by Pope Pius XI. Bishop Howard, however, was appointed archbishop of the Archdiocese of Oregon City eight months prior to Davis' death.

=== Death and legacy ===
James Davis died in Davenport on December 2, 1926. He was interred in the crypt of Sacred Heart Cathedral. His remains, along with those of the other bishops, were later moved to the Bishop's Circle in Mt. Calvary Cemetery in Davenport.

Davis Hall, a residence hall at St. Ambrose University in Davenport, is named in his honor.
