= Marvin Mottet =

Catholic priest and social justice advocate (1930–2016)

Rev. Msgr. Marvin Mottet
- Church: Catholic Church
- Diocese: Davenport
- Previous post: National Director of the Catholic Campaign for Human Development

Orders
- Ordination: June 2, 1956 by Ralph Leo Hayes

Personal details
- Born: May 31, 1930 Ottumwa, Iowa, U.S.
- Died: September 16, 2016 (aged 86) Davenport, Iowa, U.S.
- Education: St. Ambrose College; Mt. St. Bernard Seminary; University of Iowa

Marvin Alfred Mottet (May 31, 1930 – September 16, 2016) was an American Catholic priest in the Diocese of Davenport in Iowa. He was a noted advocate of social justice causes.

== Early life and education ==
Marvin Alfred Mottet was born and raised on a farm near Ottumwa, Iowa. Because his childhood paralleled the Great Depression he grew up in poverty. But because his family lived on a farm they were never hungry and they were able to pay their bills with milk by using the bartering system. He also witnessed how his father always helped neighbors and friends. He received his bachelor's degree from St. Ambrose College in Davenport, Iowa. While at St. Ambrose he was influenced by his professors, Fathers Bernard Kamerick, Edward and William O'Connor, Charles Griffith and Urban Ruhl, who fostered the lay apostolate, taught classes on labor relations, Papal social encyclicals and walked picket lines. Father Cletus Madsen introduced him to the liturgical renewal movement. He studied for the priesthood at Mount St. Bernard Seminary in Dubuque, Iowa and was ordained a priest at Sacred Heart Cathedral by Bishop Ralph Hayes on June 2, 1956. He also studied at the Center for Intercultural Formation in Cuernavaca, Mexico, the University of Notre Dame, and the Dominican House of Studies in River Forest, Illinois.

== Social Action ==
Mottet was assigned to the teaching faculty at St. Ambrose Academy in Davenport, and then to Assumption High School when it opened in 1958. He helped to form the Catholic Interracial Council (CIC) in 1957, and brought his students into contact with the racial problems that existed in Davenport. In 1963 he attended the March on Washington for Jobs and Freedom, and the CIC created the Pacem in Terris Peace and Freedom Award. He also organized the Young Catholic Students organization at Assumption. The program grew to include 400 students across the diocese from Notre Dame High School in Burlington, Hayes Catholic in Muscatine, and Aquinas in Fort Madison.

In 1967 Bishop Gerald O'Keefe sent Mottet to earn a master's degree in social work at the University of Iowa. In 1969 he started the Office of Social Action, one of the first in the United States. The operating philosophy of the new office was an emphasis on systemic change for a more just society rather than simply providing direct service to clients. During this time Catholic Charities, which had been a part of the diocese since 1929, was merged with a local social service agency. He was involved with organizations such as Project Renewal, working with migrant workers and the Catholic Worker Movement. The diocese began a resettlement program for Vietnamese refugees after the fall of Saigon in 1975. He also served as the director of the diocesan Rural Life Department during his years in the Social Action department.

Mottet developed the "Two Feet of Christian Service" philosophy of social action: direct service that is accompanied by societal change. He used an outline of a pair of shoes to illustrate his point. It became a symbol that was used by many different dioceses and organizations around the world. He helped develop the Catholic Campaign for Human Development on both the national and diocesan level. The organization is a domestic antipoverty and social justice program of the United States Conference of Catholic Bishops. In 1978 Mottet became the national director for the Campaign for Human Development in Washington, DC, the word "Catholic" was added to the organizations title at a later date. He stayed in the post until 1985, when he returned to Davenport and was assigned as parochial vicar at Sacred Heart Cathedral.

== Pastor ==
A year after returning to Davenport he replaced Msgr. Sebastian Menke as the rector and pastor of the cathedral parish. He continued working with social justice organizations such as Project Renewal, the East Side Davenport Development Groups, Quad-City Interfaith, Interfaith Housing Corp. and Legal Aid. During his time as pastor the cathedral church was extensively renovated in the early 1990s. The parochial school also became a concern. In the 1990s it merged with St. Alphonsus School in the west end to form John Paul Academy. That merger came to an end, but the school situation did not improve and in 2004 Sacred Heart, St. Alphonsus and Holy Family Schools formed All Saints School at Holy Family. In 2001 Pope John Paul II bestowed a Papal honor upon him with the title Reverend Monsignor. In 2005 he retired to St. Vincent Center in Davenport.

== Later life and death ==
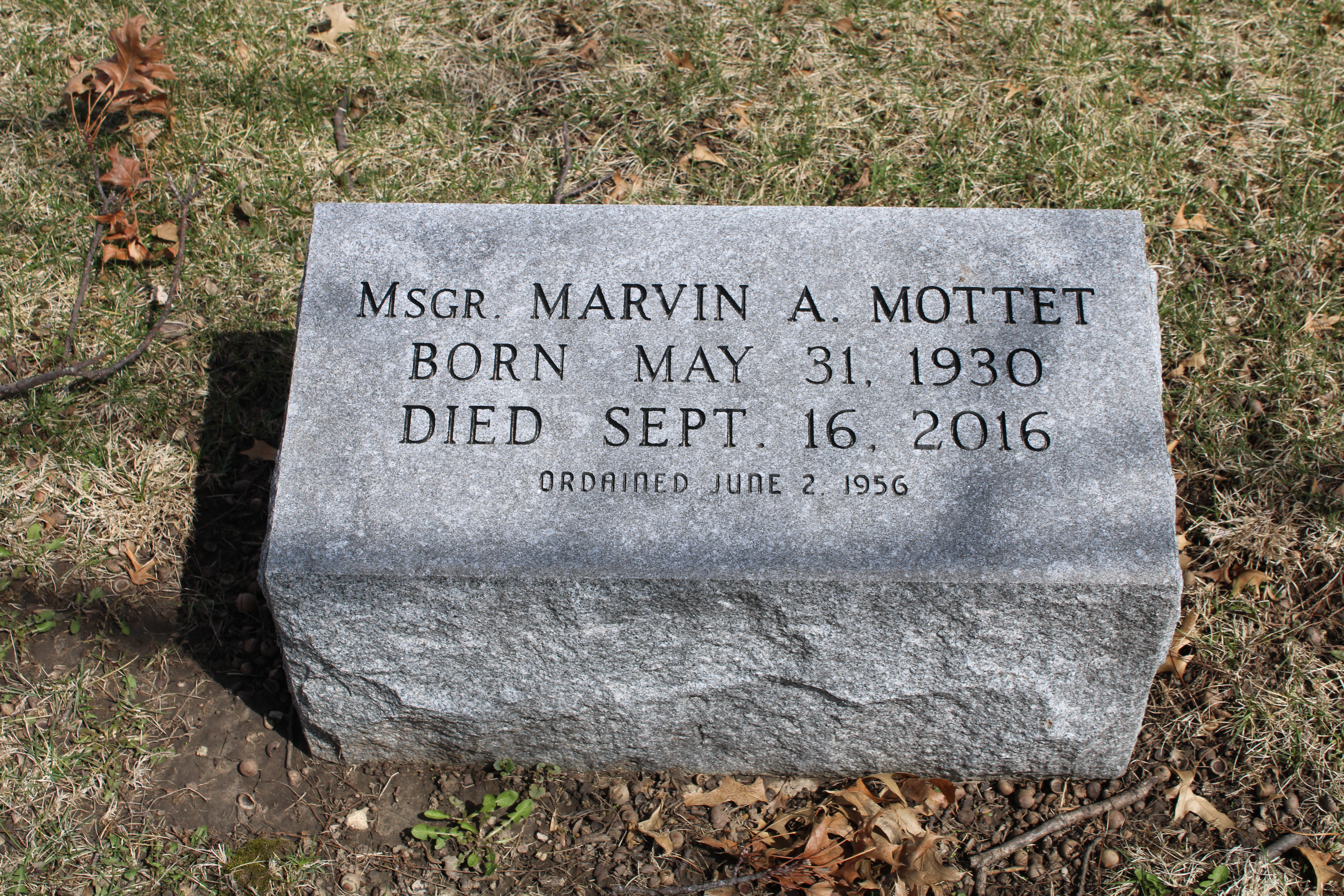
Msgr. Mottet's grave

Msgr. Mottet remained active in his retirement. He chaired the diocesan Catholic Campaign for Human Development and continued to assist social service agencies. He marched in a rally in Postville, Iowa to support the immigrants who worked there without legal permission and were effected by an immigration raid on the meatpacking plant. Mottet was honored with the Pacem in Terris Award in 2008, and the Servant of Justice Award from the Roundtable Association of Catholic Diocesan Social Action in 2012. He also continued to advocate for social justice issues. Mottet was involved in Charismatic Renewal and healing ministries, which were a part of his ministry before his retirement. The Davenport Civil Rights Commission named the Marvin Mottet Award for Clergy and Community Service in his honor.

As his health declined, Mottet moved to the Kahl Home in Davenport. In June 2016 Msgr. Mottet celebrated his 60th anniversary of ordination. He died three months later at the age of 86 on September 16 at the Kahl Home. His funeral was held at Sacred Heart Cathedral on September 21, 2016, and he was buried in Mount Calvary Cemetery in Davenport.
