= Cork Hill District =

- U.S. National Register of Historic Places
- U.S. Historic district
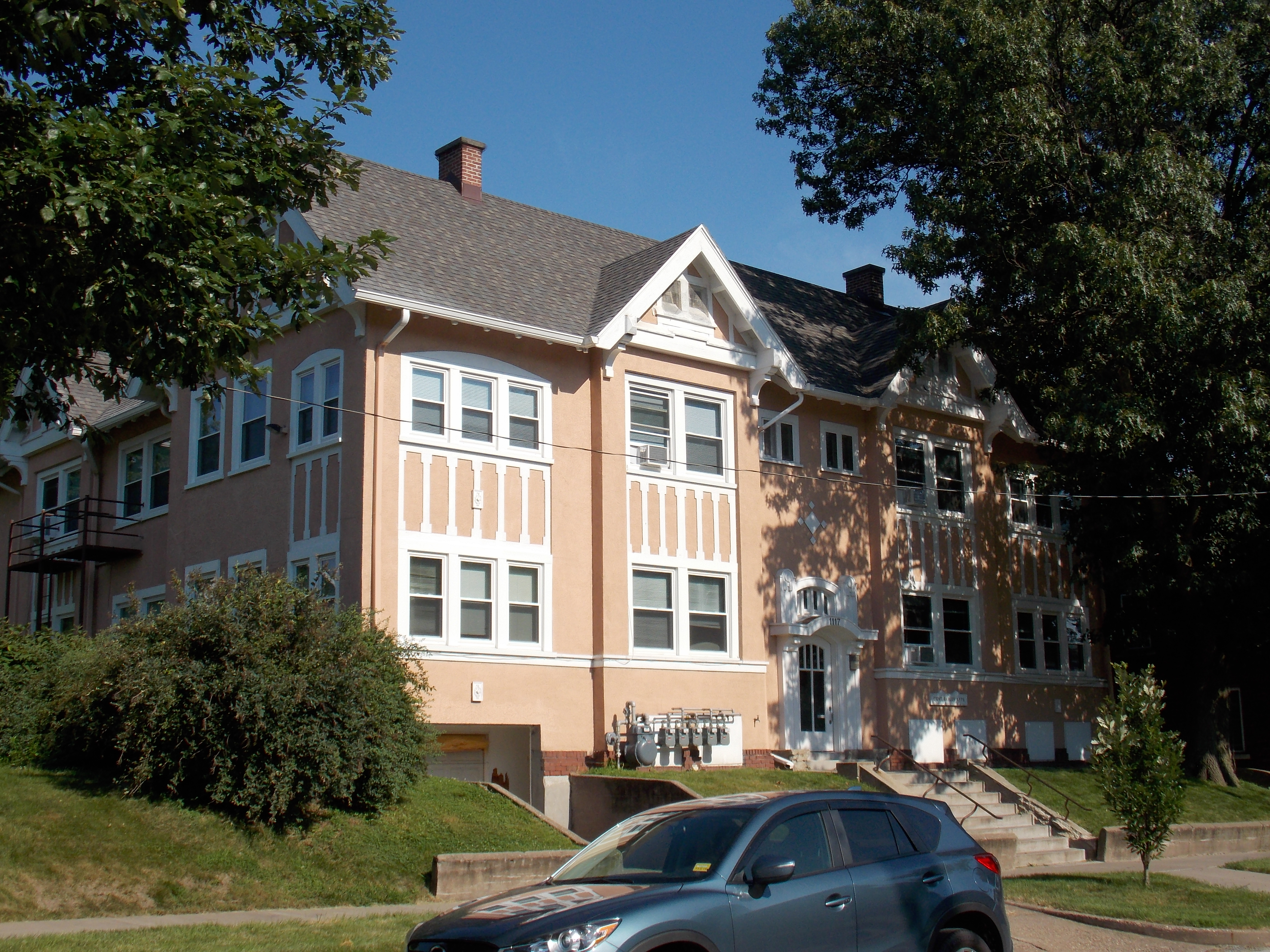
- Eight-Gables at 1117 Perry Street

- Location within Iowa Location within the United States
- Location: Perry, Pershing, Iowa, 11th, 12th, and 13th Streets, Davenport, Iowa
- Coordinates: 41°31′54″N 90°34′18″W
- Area: 18.7 acres (7.6 ha)
- Architect: Multiple
- Architectural style: Greek Revival; Italianate; Victorian
- MPS: Davenport MRA
- NRHP reference No.: 84001334
- Added to NRHP: May 16, 1984

The Cork Hill District is a nationally recognized historic district located in Davenport, Iowa, United States. It was listed on the National Register of Historic Places in 1984. The historic district covers 18.7-acre (7.6 ha) and stretches from the campus of Palmer College of Chiropractic on the west to the Sacred Heart Cathedral Complex on the east. It is the western half of a neighborhood of the same name. When listed, the district included 12 contributing buildings. It includes Greek Revival, Italianate, and Victorian architecture. The district was covered in a 1982 study of the Davenport Multiple Resource Area and/or its 1983 follow-on.

== History ==
Cork Hill itself is the western section of a larger area of Davenport known as the LeClaire Reserve, named after the landowner and city founder Antoine LeClaire. It was a large Yankee-Irish neighborhood on the east side of town. The houses of the Cork Hill District reflect the long history of the development of the LeClaire Reserve. The area developed in an unsystematic fashion that resulted in a mixture of architectural forms and styles on every block. LeClaire himself built his home in the Reserve in 1855 and St. Margaret's Church in 1856. Other prominent families, such as the Frenches, also moved to the area. The family of industrialists were also patrons of the arts and literature in the city. Alice French, whose pen name was Octave Thanet, was known as the first Iowa author with a national reputation.

The Irish started moving to Davenport after the Great Famine in Ireland of the 1840s and 1850s. Because large numbers of Irish immigrants settled around St. Margaret's Church, the area became known as Cork Hill. Many of the Irish who were located here were laborers who worked for the railroads or in the mills along the Mississippi River. Most of the houses belonging to Irish families were replaced at the end of the 19th century and the beginning of the 20th century by larger dwellings. However, because of this early association with the Irish the area surrounding Sacred Heart Cathedral, which replaced St. Margaret's in 1891, continues to be referred to as Cork Hill.

== Architecture ==
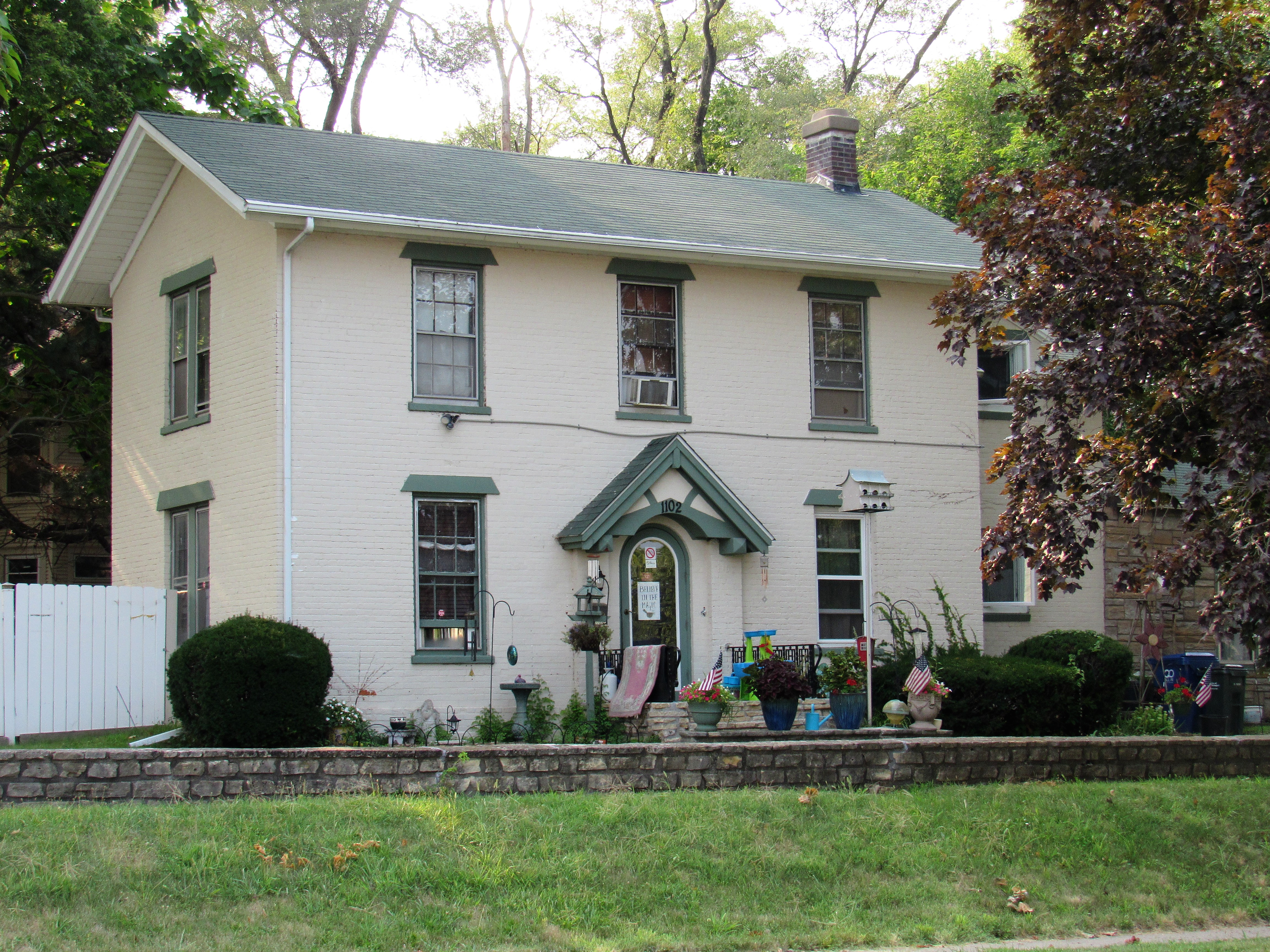
House on Iowa Street

The homes built in the Cork Hill District reflect most of the major architectural styles of the 19th century. They are, however, simpler than the homes found in the Hamburg Historic District, the former German neighborhood which is located on the bluff to the west. The contrast shows how the various styles were adapted to suit different income levels and tastes. For the most part, the houses here are two stories tall and frame construction. They are mostly single-family dwellings or were at the time they were built. Double houses were also built in the district and were distinguishable by their double entrances.

The earliest houses on Cork Hill were built in the Greek Revival style that was popular in early Davenport architecture and continued as the city matured. The Italianate style started to appear in the 1850s, and its use was popularized by LeClaire's house. It was followed by Queen Anne and Gothic Revival styles. As the 19th century came to a close the Colonial Revival style became more popular, as did the American Craftsman and Victorian styles. A couple of houses were also influenced by the Prairie School. While most of the homes were built as single-family structures, there is also a significant number of double houses on Cork Hill.
