= Sacred Heart Cathedral (Davenport, Iowa) =

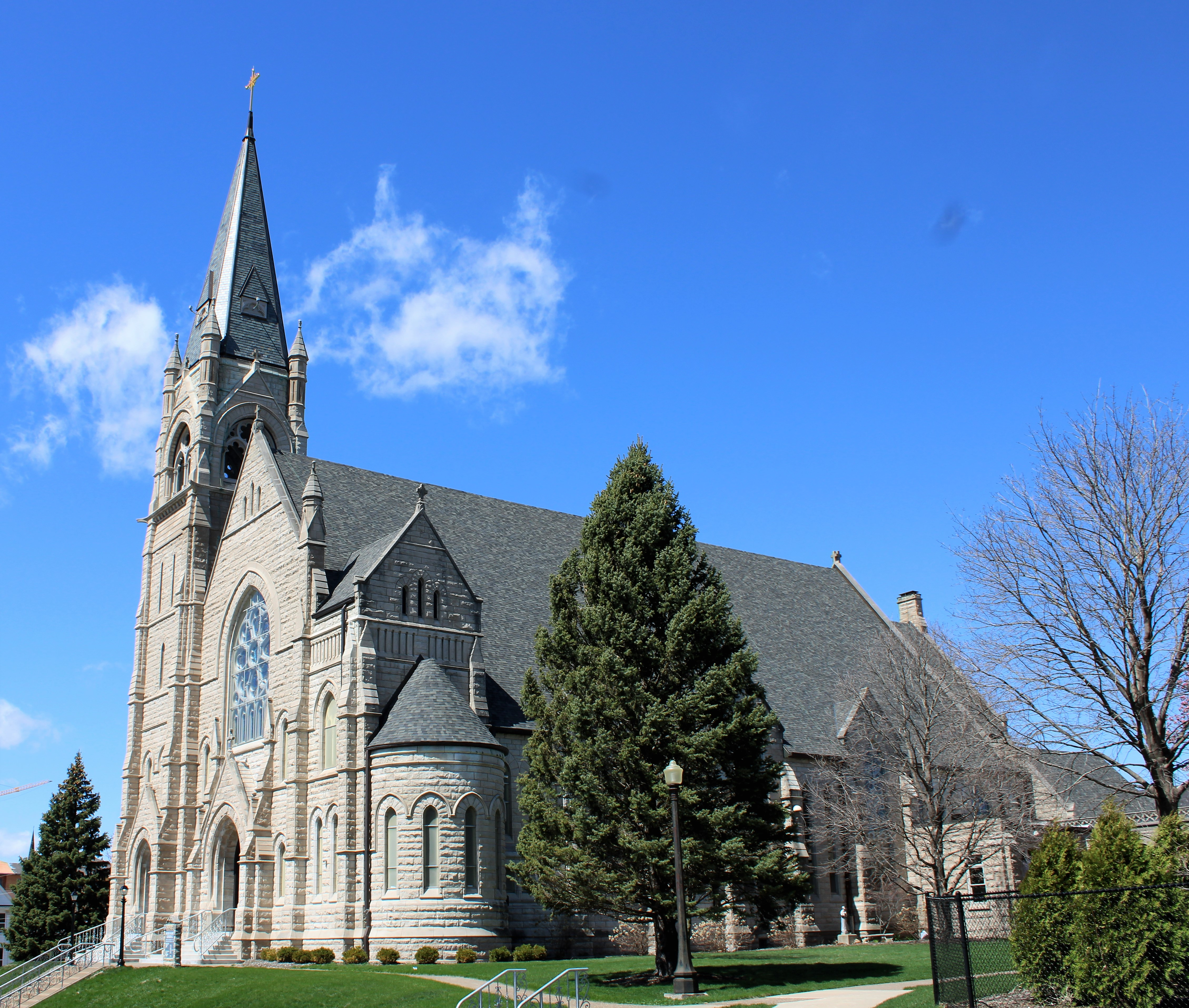
- Sacred Heart Cathedral in 2022
- Sacred Heart Cathedral
- Location: 422 E. 10th St. Davenport, Iowa
- Country: United States
- Denomination: Catholic Church
- Website: shcdavenport.org

History
- Status: Cathedral/parish
- Founded: 1856 (parish)
- Dedication: Sacred Heart of Jesus
- Dedicated: November 15, 1891

Architecture
- Functional status: Active
- Architect: James J. Egan (cathedral)
- Style: Gothic Revival
- Groundbreaking: June 1889
- Completed: 1891

Specifications
- Length: 180 feet (55 m)
- Width: 80 feet (24 m)
- Height: 75 feet (23 m)
- Materials: Bedford stone

Administration
- Diocese: Davenport

Clergy
- Bishop: Most Rev. Dennis Walsh
- Rector: Rev. Jason Crossen
- Sacred Heart Roman Catholic; Cathedral Complex
- U.S. National Register of Historic Places
- Location within Iowa Location within the United States
- Coordinates: 41°31′49″N 90°34′8″W
- Area: 2.35 acres (0.95 ha)
- Architect: Gustav Hanssen (Rectory); George P. Stauduhar (convent)
- Architectural style: Late 19th and 20th Century Revivals, Tudor Gothic Revival
- MPS: Davenport MRA
- NRHP reference No.: 84001537
- Added to NRHP: April 5, 1984

Sacred Heart Cathedral, located in Davenport, Iowa, United States, is a Catholic cathedral and a parish church in the Diocese of Davenport. The cathedral is located on a bluff overlooking the Mississippi River to the east of Downtown Davenport. It is listed on the National Register of Historic Places as part of the Sacred Heart Roman Catholic Cathedral Complex. This designation includes the church building, rectory, and the former convent, which was torn down in 2012. The cathedral is adjacent to the Cork Hill Historic District, also on the National Register. Its location on Cork Hill, a section of the city settled by Irish immigrants.

== St. Margaret’s Cathedral ==
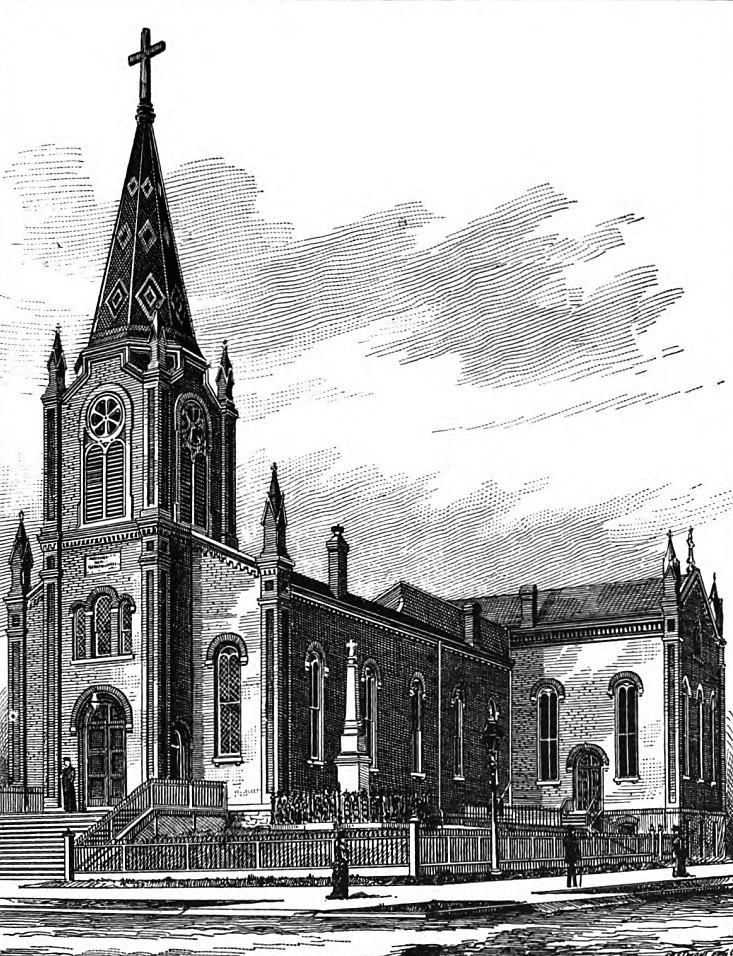
St. Margaret's Cathedral with the grave of Antoine LeClaire in foreground

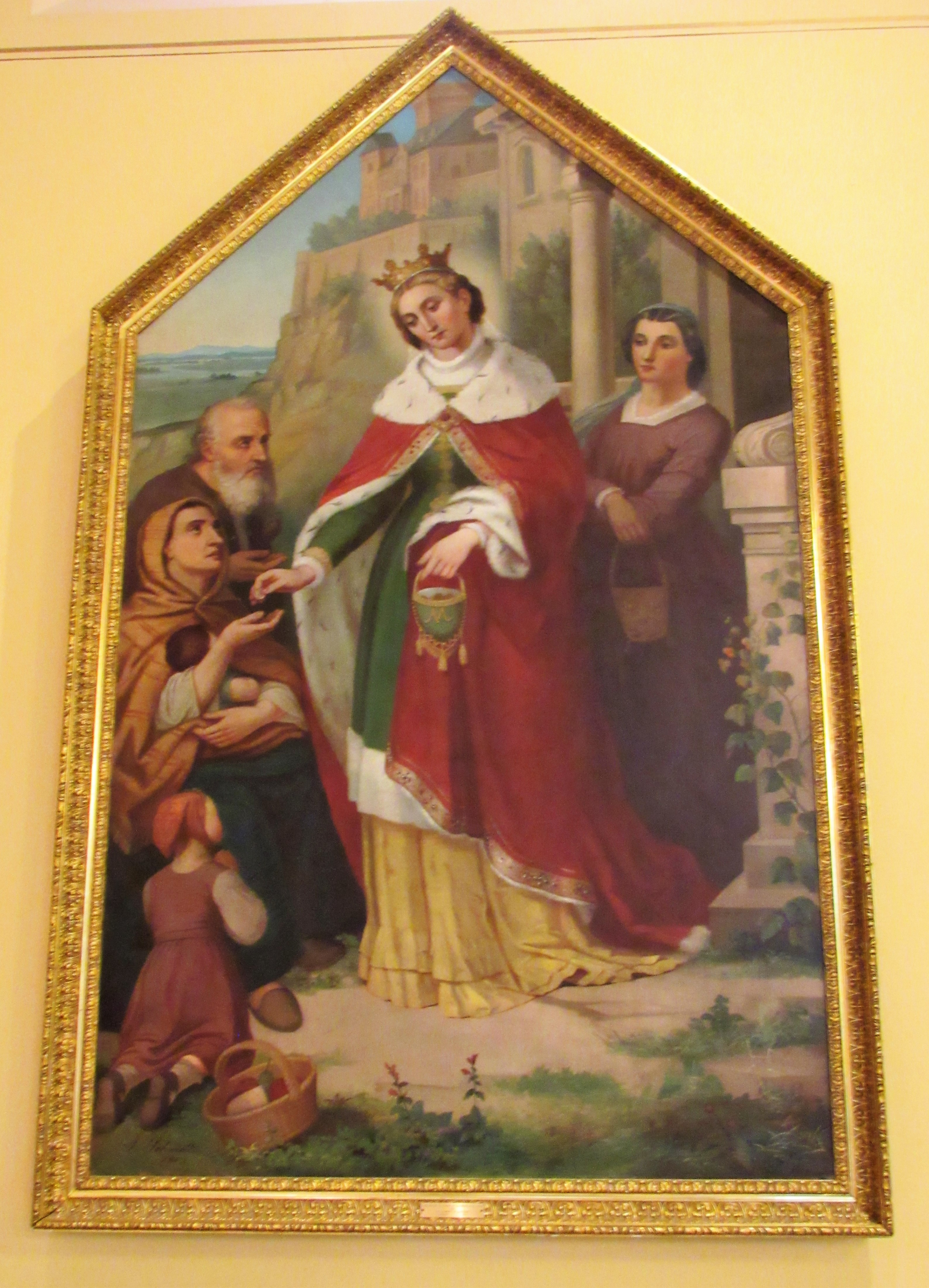
Painting of St. Margaret

The parish traces its history back to 1856, when population growth in the city of Davenport led the Dubuque Diocese to establish a new parish on top of the hill on the east side of Davenport. Antoine and Marguerite LeClaire donated the parcel of land and funds to build the church. Before this time parishioners attended St. Anthony's Church in downtown Davenport.

On June 29, 1856, Bishop Mathias Loras of Dubuque laid the cornerstone for the church. Antoine LeClaire directed the construction of the church, which was named St. Margaret (or sometimes listed as St. Marguerite) in honor of St. Margaret of Scotland and Marguerite LeClaire. The church was built of red brick in the Romanesque Revival style. A frame rectory was built next to the church. It was moved to the back of the parish property in 1859 and a brick rectory replaced it. Once again Antoine LeClaire provided the money. A year later a brick building was built on the west side of the church. It was meant to be a part of a future expansion of the church. The upper floor housed a Sodality Chapel and the main floor included a sacristy and school rooms for boys.

The Rev. Andrew Trevis was named the parish's first pastor. In 1857 the Rev. Henry Cosgrove was assigned to St. Margaret's after his ordination and became the pastor in 1861. He was destined to spend the rest of his life associated with the parish.

During the American Civil War from 1861 to 1865 the Union Army established a headquarters in Davenport. There were five army camps in the city and four of them were within St. Margaret's parish boundaries. Undoubtedly, this affected the parish and the pastor's ministry. After the war an addition was made to the church building in 1866 forming a wing on the right side of the original church structure. The 1860 building on the left side was also incorporated into the church. An unusual feature of the church was that the roofline of the addition was higher than that of the original church.

An arsonist, who was never caught, set fire to the church on May 2, 1873. Damage was limited to the altar. A new altar was installed later that year with a painting of St. Margaret that now hangs in the present cathedral. Another criminal act affected the parish in the early hours of the morning of March 31, 1878, when two gunmen and a third individual attempted to rob the parish of a collection from the Forty Hours' Devotion the night before. One of the gunman shot at, but missed, Father Cosgrove who was still in bed. They escaped without the collection, but with jewelry from the housekeeper's daughter. A $3,000 reward was offered and the three men were caught and sentenced to prison terms at the Anamosa State Penitentiary.

On May 8, 1881, Pope Leo XIII established the Diocese of Davenport. The Very Rev. John McMullen, the vicar general of the Archdiocese of Chicago and rector of Holy Name Cathedral, was chosen as the first bishop, and he made St. Margaret's his cathedral. A reception for him was held on July 30, 1881. A platform was built on the front of the church for the occasion. Bishop McMullen celebrated Mass for the first time in St. Margaret's Cathedral the following day. Father Cosgrove became the cathedral's rector and the vicar general of the diocese.

Bishop McMullen died on July 4, 1883, and was buried below the high altar of St. Margaret's. On July 11, 1884, Father Cosgrove was named by Pope Leo XIII to replace McMullen as Bishop of Davenport. He was the first of four rectors/pastors to be named a bishop.

== Sacred Heart Cathedral ==
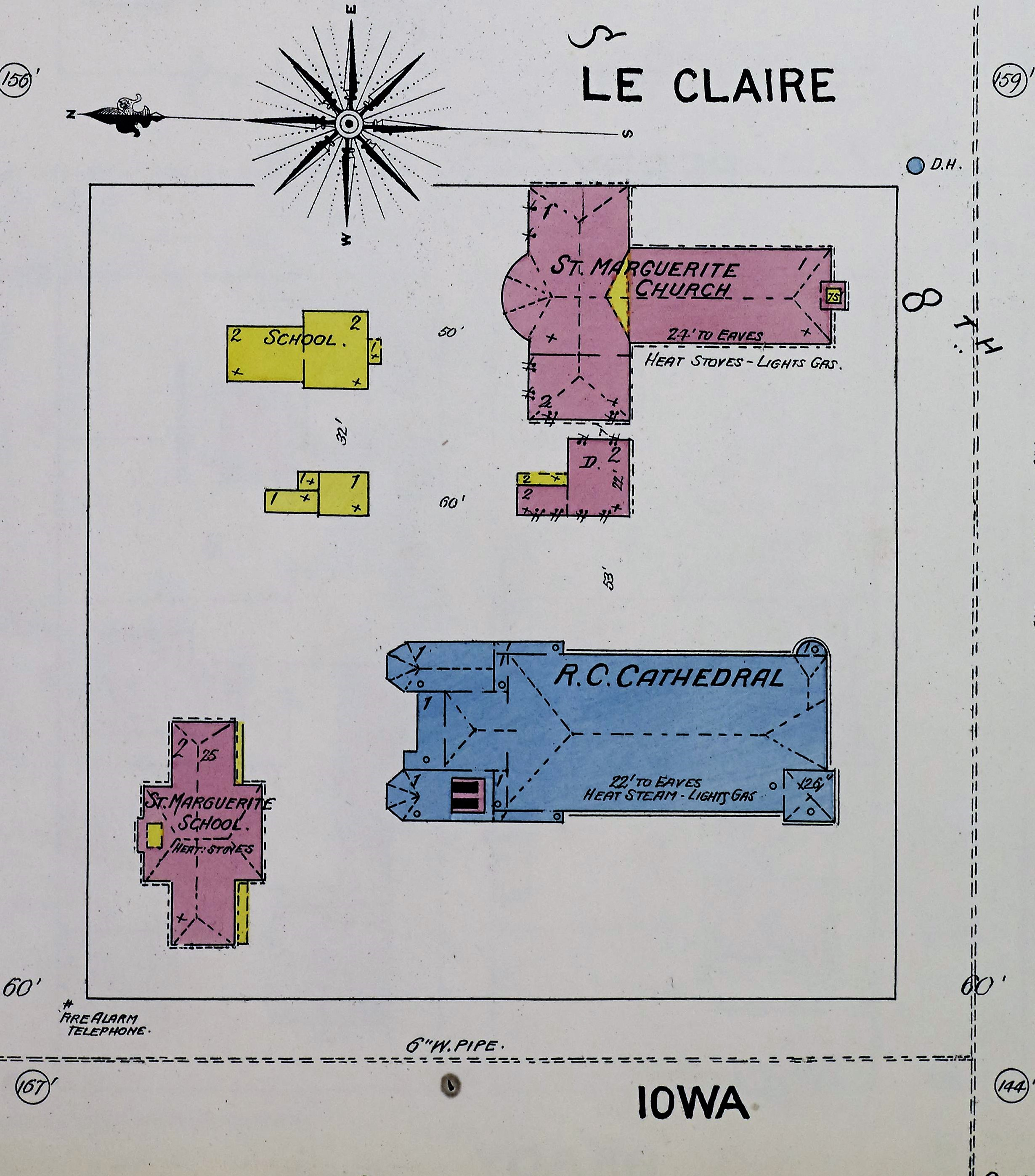
An 1892 Sanborn fire insurance map shows the old St. Margaret's (pink, top) in relation to the newer Sacred Heart (blue, bottom).

=== A new cathedral ===
In 1889, Bishop Cosgrove decided that a new, larger church should be built. The parish was out-growing the old church and there was a desire for a structure with more of a cathedral image. The church property sits in a residential area where the city's Irish community resided from the 1850s to 1900. Because a disproportionate number of people had their origins in County Cork the neighborhood became known as Cork Hill.

The initial planning for the new cathedral was carried out by Father Trevis, who was once again assigned to St Margaret's after Cosgrove was named bishop. The assignment became too much for him, however, and he was replaced by the Rev. James Davis. James J. Egan, an architect from Chicago, was chosen to design the new cathedral. At the same time, he also designed St. Ambrose Church in Des Moines, which became a cathedral in 1911. The Ecclesiological Society, which had a mission of preserving Gothic Revival architecture, was an influence in the church design. The cathedral was built on the English parish church model. Walsh & Edwards of Davenport were chosen to be the contractor, and Davenport architect Victor Huot as supervising architect.

On April 27, 1890, the cornerstone for the new cathedral was laid. Gas pipe that was to be used for interior lighting was laid in February 1891. That same month lathing was applied and the walls and ceiling were plastered in April. The woodwork was completed by June. The frames for the windows were manufactured at a mill across the river in Rock Island, Illinois. The frame for the large window in the apse weighs 3 1/2 tons. The windows were donated by individuals and groups. The new cathedral was finished in 1891, and it was dedicated on November 15 of that year by Bishop Cosgrove. Bishop John Hennessy of Dubuque preached the sermon at the dedication. In the evening the cathedral choir presented a concert of sacred music and Bishop John Lancaster Spalding of Peoria delivered a lecture.

=== Name change ===
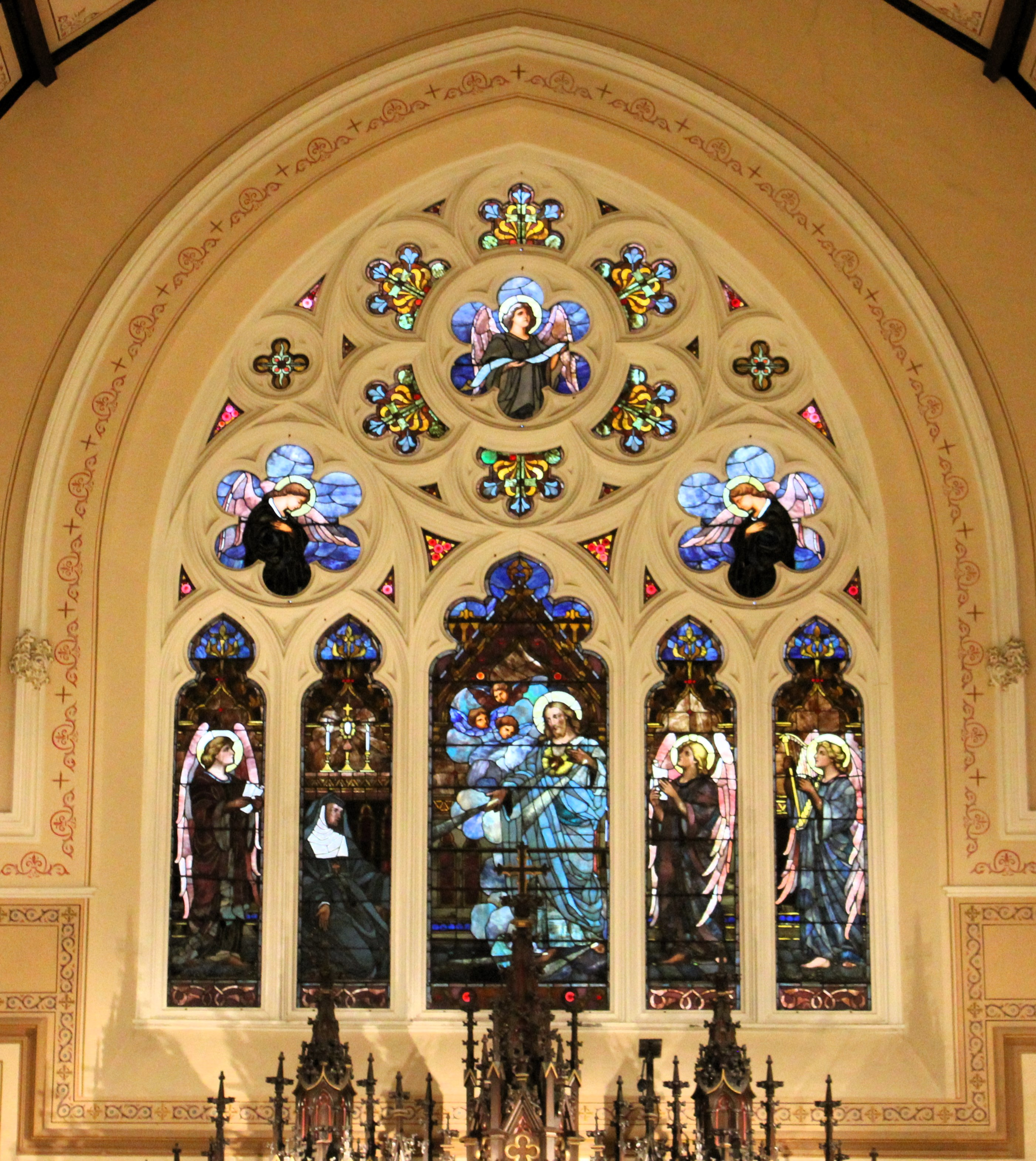
The Sacred Heart window in the apse

It was Father Trevis who suggested the parish's name change. He had visited Paray-le-Monial in France where St. Margaret Mary Alacoque had the visions of the Sacred Heart. The devotion was popular within St. Margaret's parish. Bishop Cosgrove also had a devotion to the Sacred Heart and had the image emblazoned on his coat of arms. The bishop requested permission from Pope Leo XIII to name the new church Sacred Heart Cathedral. On December 23, 1889, the pope granted this permission on the grounds that a chapel dedicated to St. Margaret be maintained in the church. Sacred Heart Cathedral was the first cathedral to be dedicated to the Sacred Heart in the United States.

=== Architecture ===
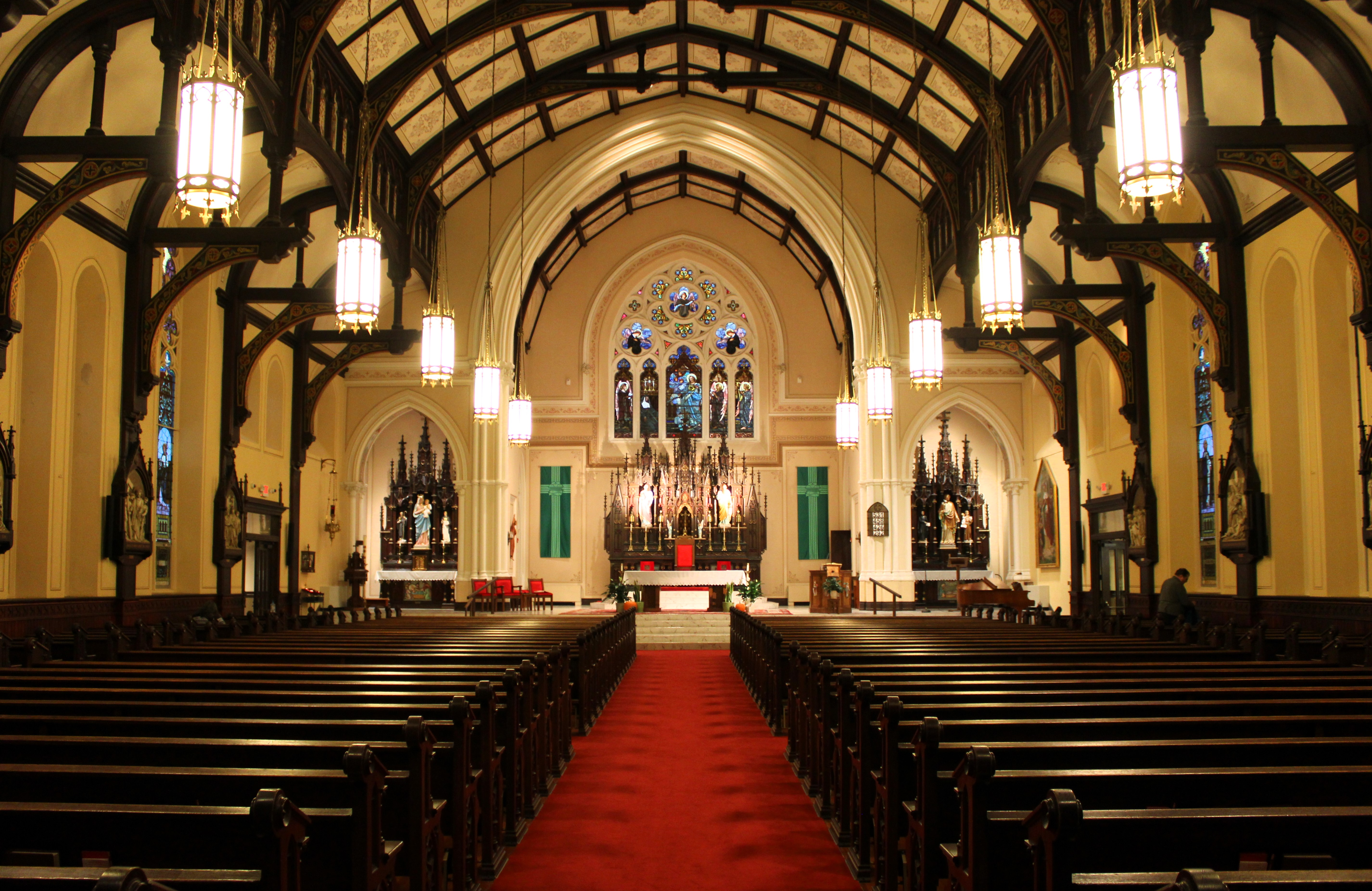
The nave from the back

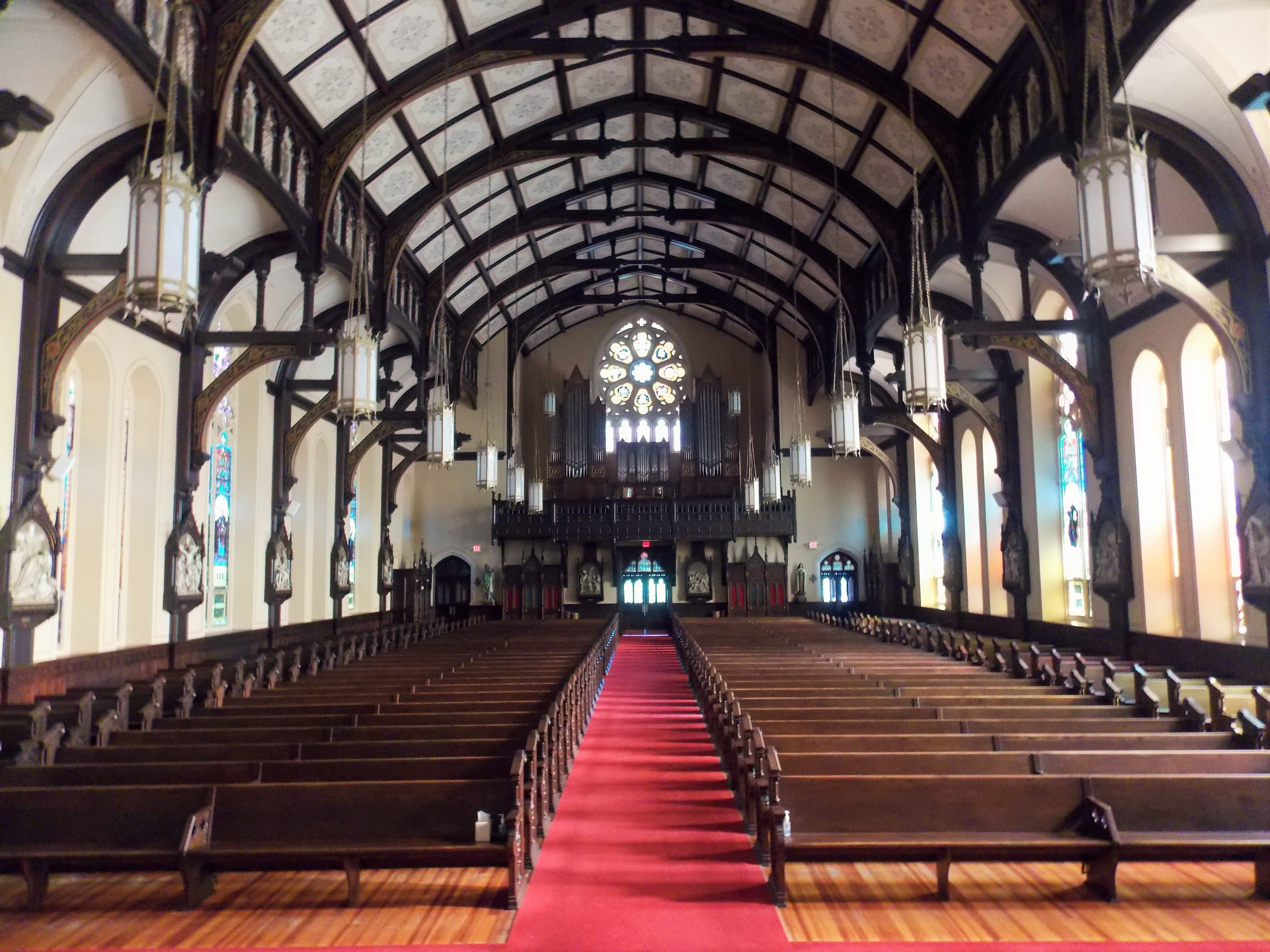
The nave from the altar

Sacred Heart follows a basilica plan with a corner tower. The foundation is composed of Anamosa Limestone and the walls of the structure are brick, clad in rock-faced Bedford stone quarried in Indiana. The nave is nine bays in length, and they are divided by buttresses. The first bay is the tower section. The other bays contain either a tracery or paired lancet window, which alternate down the nave. The church measures 180 feet (55 m) in length and its nave is 65 feet (20 m) wide. Across the back, where the sacristy and St. Margaret's chapel are located, it is 80 feet (24 m) wide. The roof rises 75 feet (23 m) above the ground and the spire on top of the tower is 160 feet (49 m) tall. When it was completed the cathedral was the tallest structure in the Quad Cities.

The church features an open interior without columns. There is an extensive amount of woodwork in the interior, including the altars, pews, ceiling, wainscoting, and the gallery frontal. There are four sets of oak pews across the width of the church. The vaulted ceiling is supported by hammer beams. The reliefs below the old high altar depict the sacrifice of Able, Abraham and his son Isaac, and the priest Melchizedek. The three Old Testament images are found in the Roman Canon. The statues of St. Peter and St. Paul were added later. Gold reliquaries that contain relics of various saints are in nooks on either side of the reredos. The shrine of the Blessed Virgin Mary on the left side of the church contains statues of St. Benedict on the left and St. Thomas Aquinas on the right, that were added in 1902. At the base of the altar is a relief of the Dormition of the Virgin. The St. Joseph shrine contains statues of St. Ignatius of Loyola on the left and St. Anthony of Padua on the right that were also added in 1902. At the base of the altar is a relief of Joseph on his deathbed with Mary and Jesus at his side. Initially, the bishop's throne was placed in the archway on the left side of the sanctuary. The large Stations of the Cross are bas reliefs with wood frames that line the sidewalls of the church. They were installed in 1892.

The stained glass windows feature bright colors that were chosen by Bishop Cosgrove. The tall windows on the sides of the nave depict the Twelve Apostles. The rose window on the front of the church includes the following Christian images: an anchor for hope, wheat for bread, a crown for Christ the King, keys for the Apostle Peter, a dove for the Holy Spirit, the cross and crown for the crucifixion, the chalice and bread for the Holy Communion, and a harp for music and worship. The large window over the altar depicts Jesus appearing to St. Margaret Mary Alacoque, who spread the devotion to the Sacred Heart of Jesus.

The first electric lights in the cathedral were installed in the sanctuary in 1895. Previously, the church had been lit by gas lighting. A renovation of the cathedral's interior was completed in 1907. It included a frescoing of the interior, enlarging the choir loft, and adding six hundred new lights.

=== 20th century ===
Bishop Cosgrove's health started to fail in the early 1900s and he requested a coadjutor bishop. Once again the cathedral's rector was chosen to be a bishop. Bishop Davis was the first bishop consecrated in Sacred Heart Cathedral, on November 30, 1904. He replaced Bishop Cosgrove upon the latter's death two years later.

By the end of the first decade of the 20th century, the parish's boundaries were set. In 1902 Our Lady of Lourdes was established in Gilbert, present-day Bettendorf, and in 1909 St. Paul the Apostle was founded in Davenport. The parish's boundaries include some of the poorer sections of the central city as well as some of Davenport's older and wealthier neighborhoods.

Lightning hit the building on August 20, 1928. The lightning-sparked a fire between the slates of the roof and the ceiling. This caused extensive smoke and water damage to the church. Services were held in St. Margaret's Chapel and the school auditorium during the repairs. The church was repainted in a gothic design. In order to hide the damage, the woodwork was stained a dark English Oak color. The ceiling decorations were completed by the Davenport decorating firm of Hartman and Sedding.

Two priests of the Davenport diocese were consecrated as bishop for other dioceses in Sacred Heart Cathedral. Bishop William Adrian, who spent most of his career at St. Ambrose College, was consecrated for the Diocese of Nashville on April 16, 1936, by Archbishop Amleto Cicognani. Bishop Maurice Dingman, who held a variety of administrative positions in the diocese, was ordained for the Diocese of Des Moines on June 19, 1968, by Archbishop Luigi Raimondi. His was one of the first episcopal ordinations celebrated in the vernacular.

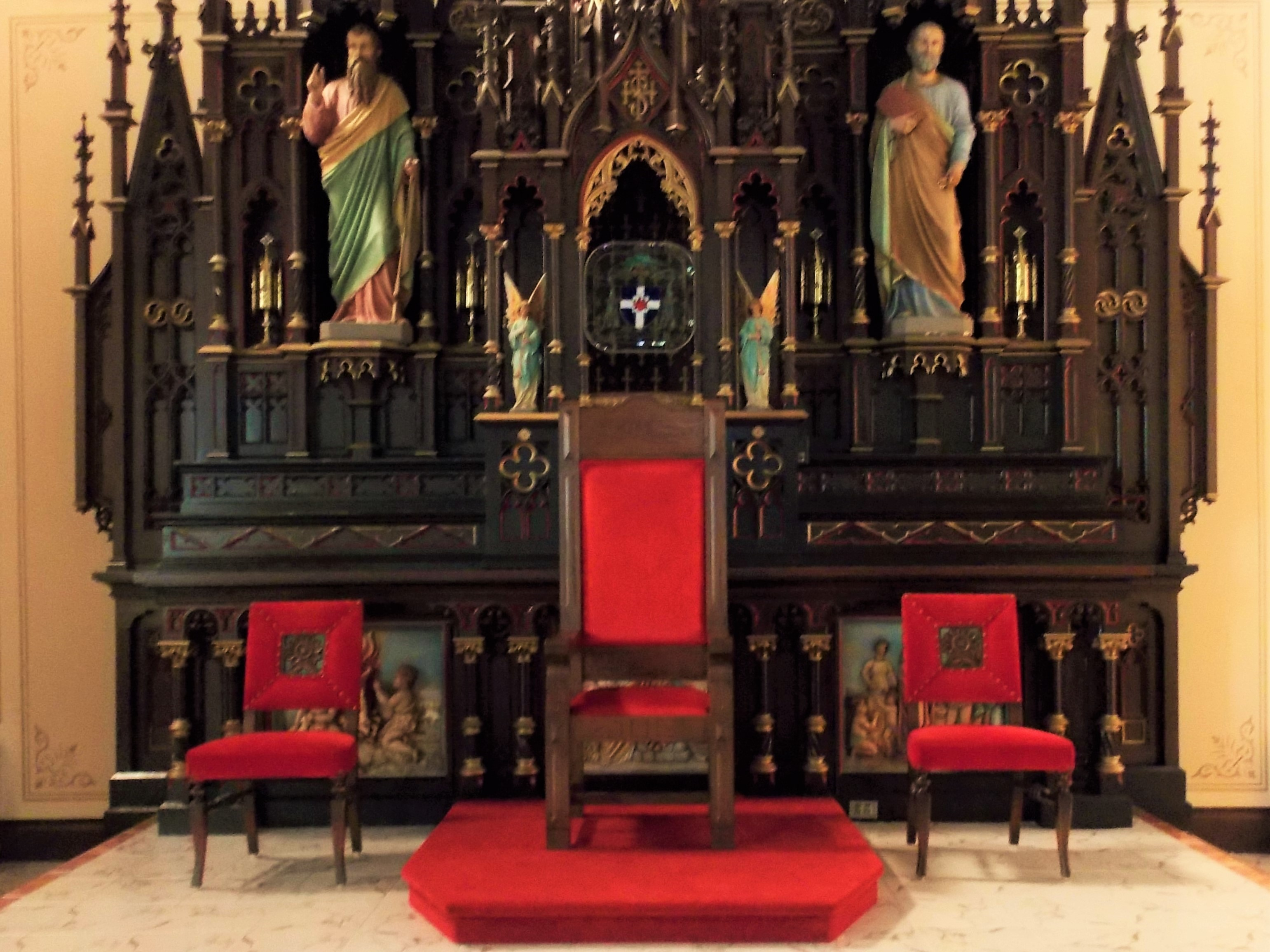
The cathedra

Starting in the 1960s the parish implemented a number of changes, which were in line with the reforms of the Second Vatican Council. In March 1964 a new altar was set up that allowed the priest to face the congregation. The cathedral was the first church in the Quad Cities to make this change. The communion rail, pulpit and bishop's throne were removed in 1980. A new cathedra, or bishop's chair, was placed against the reredos so that he would face the congregation. The liturgies were celebrated in English instead of Latin.

Social Ministry has been a hallmark of the cathedral parish since the pastorate of Msgr. Sebastian Menke. El Centro Cultural Hispano was founded in 1975 to serve the needs of Spanish-speaking people throughout the Quad City area. Masses in Spanish were celebrated at the cathedral starting in 1977. The Latino community eventually relocated to St. Joseph's Church in Davenport. A clothing center that provides free clothes to those in need was established in the cathedral basement, and later a community food pantry was started by the parish. Sacred Heart was one of the founding churches of Quad Cities Interfaith. It also started Interfaith Housing, a non-profit corporation to rehab old and rundown houses in the inner city neighborhood.

Extensive renovations were done to the cathedral in the early 1990s. These renovations were made possible through the result of the generosity of parishioner Elizabeth Kahl-Figge who included the parish in her will. This included replacing the roof and repainting the interior of the church. The painting of St. Margaret of Scotland that hung in St. Margaret's Chapel was repaired and hung in the cathedral. The painting dates to 1873 and is the work of Johann Schmitt. It was originally hung in the high altar of the old cathedral. The painting was severely damaged when it was removed from the old church. It was restored in 1990 at the Intermuseum Laboratory in Oberlin, Ohio.

=== 21st century ===
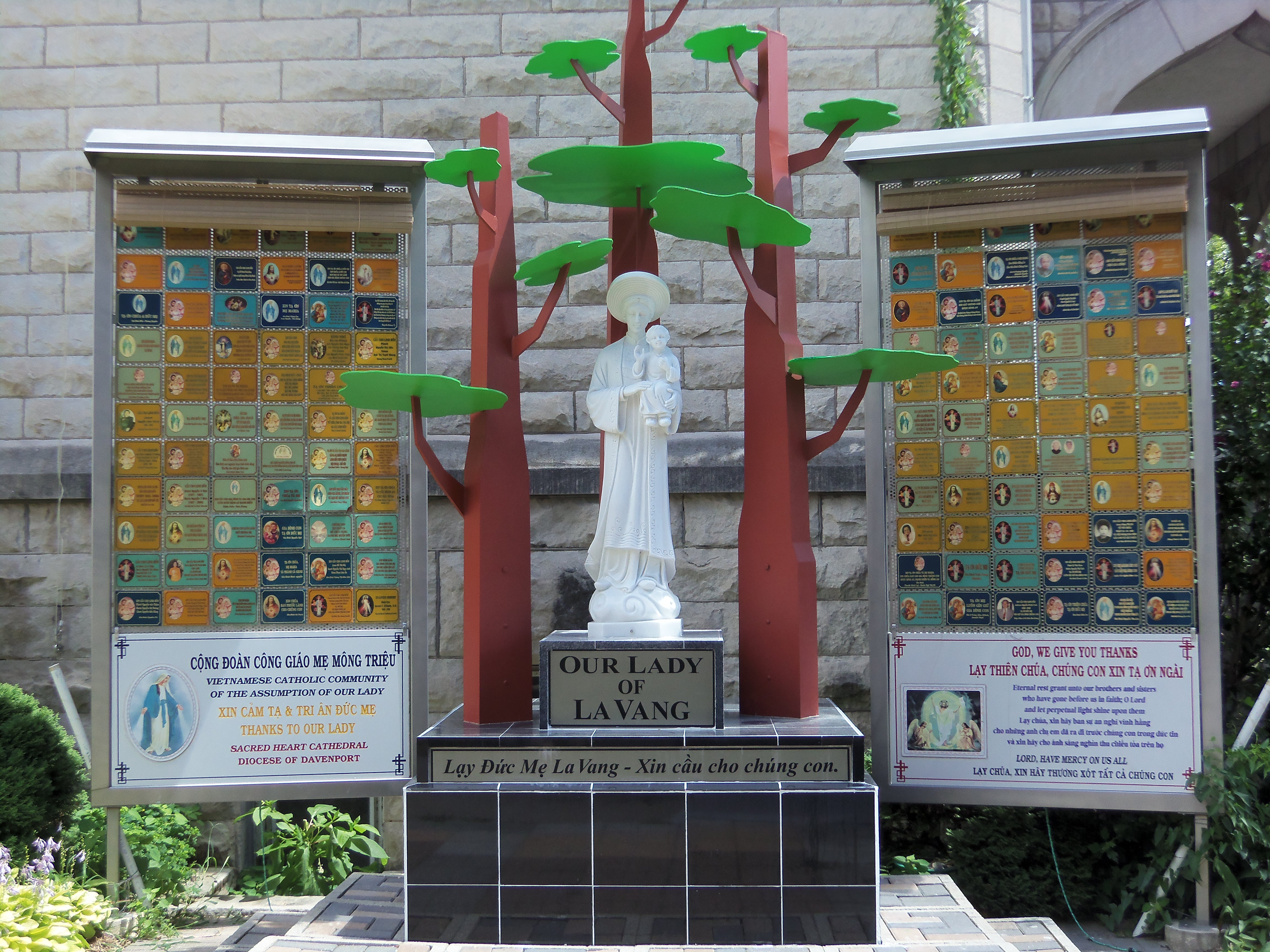
Our Lady of La Vang shrine

In 2001, liturgies celebrated in Vietnamese were added to accommodate the area's growing Vietnamese Community, which had been worshiping at St. Ambrose University for 20 years. A shrine to Our Lady of La Vang was added to the cathedral grounds in 2004.

On May 26, 2011, Pope Benedict XVI named Msgr. Robert Gruss as the Bishop of Rapid City. He had served as the cathedral's rector and the parish pastor since 2010. Gruss was the third rector/pastor to be named a bishop.

During the pastorate of the Rev. Richard Adam, Bracke-Hayes-Miller-Mahon Architects (BHMM) of Davenport began working with the parish in 2012 to develop a plan to update the parish facilities. A new handicap-accessible entrance on the east side of the cathedral was completed in 2013. In September 2016 construction began on the new hall immediately behind the cathedral. It includes a gathering space, restrooms, a handicap-accessible entrance on the west side, a reception hall, and classrooms. Mark Miller was the principal architect and Swanson Construction of Bettendorf was the contractor. The hall was dedicated by Bishop Thomas Zinkula on November 19, 2017. It was named for parishioners Weir and Pat Sears who gave the first $1 million for the $7 million project. The gathering space was named in honor of Antoine and Marguerite LeClaire. The parking lot was expanded and repaved.

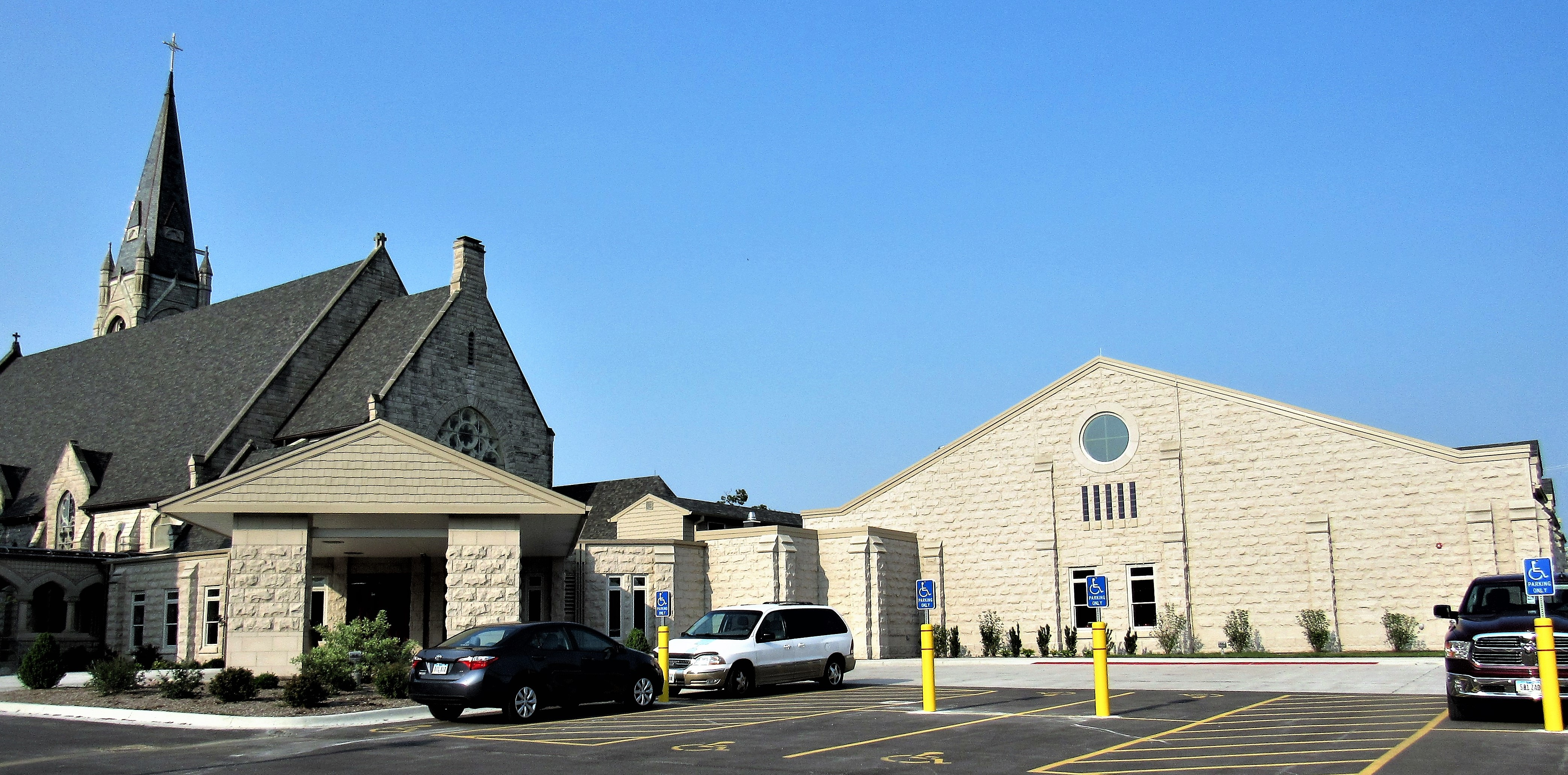
Sears Center Diocesan Hall

A tornado struck Davenport on October 6, 2016. It did some damage to the cathedral and the rectory. They were repaired, along with several other Catholic churches in the city, in the summer of 2017. The original iron cross was replaced by a new aluminum, 24-karat, gold leaf cross. The new cross was replicated from the original by a company in Kentucky. A new carillon was added to the tower at this time. The tower's original bell, cast for St. Margaret's in 1856, was removed, cleaned, and placed in front of the new hall's porte-cochere. In 2019, the renovation project concluded with cleaning and repairing the stained glass windows, which was done in memory of Msgr. Marvin Mottet, the former parish pastor and cathedral rector.

On July 10, 2025, Pope Leo XIV named the Rev. Thomas J. Hennen as the Bishop of Baker in Oregon. Hennen had been Sacred Heart's pastor and cathedral rector since 2021. He is the fourth pastor/rector to be named a bishop.

== Rectory and convent ==
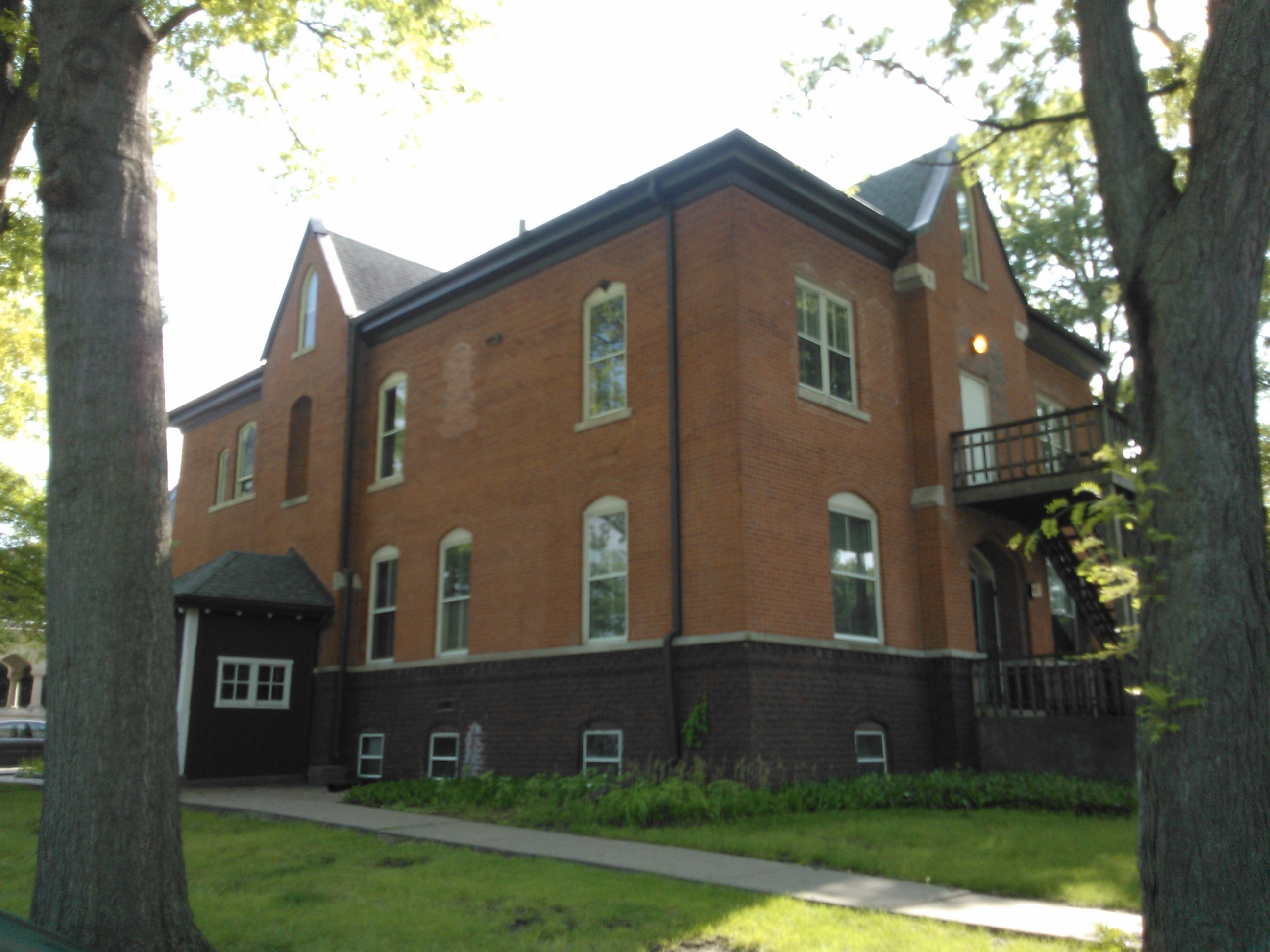
Sacred Heart Convent

The current rectory was designed by Davenport architect Gustav Hanssen and it was completed in 1895. The 2 1/2-story house was built in the Tudor Gothic style. It was designed to complement the cathedral's Gothic Revival style without copying it exactly. The exterior is composed of limestone. The structure is capped with a steep hipped roof and intersecting gables. The window openings are largely rectangular and some include tracery. There are also a few lancet windows. The front porch and a walkway that connects the rectory to the cathedral feature wide Tudor arches. At the time of the rectory's construction, there was a friendly rivalry among the clergy as the bishop's residence at the time was not as large or modern. An addition that included office space and garages was added to the east side of the rectory.

The convent was designed by Rock Island architect George P. Stauduhar. It was composed of red brick to give variety to the cathedral complex. The two-story structure was completed in 1902 and followed the Gothic and Tudor styles of the church and rectory, although in a more simplified form. It was capped by a low hipped roof with gable pavilions. The convent featured pointed-arch windows in the pavilions and polygonal bay windows on the south side of the structure. The convent's location was centered behind the cathedral and the rectory. In 2012 it was torn down as part of the effort to create a new side entrance with better access for the disabled into the cathedral.

== Sacred Heart School ==
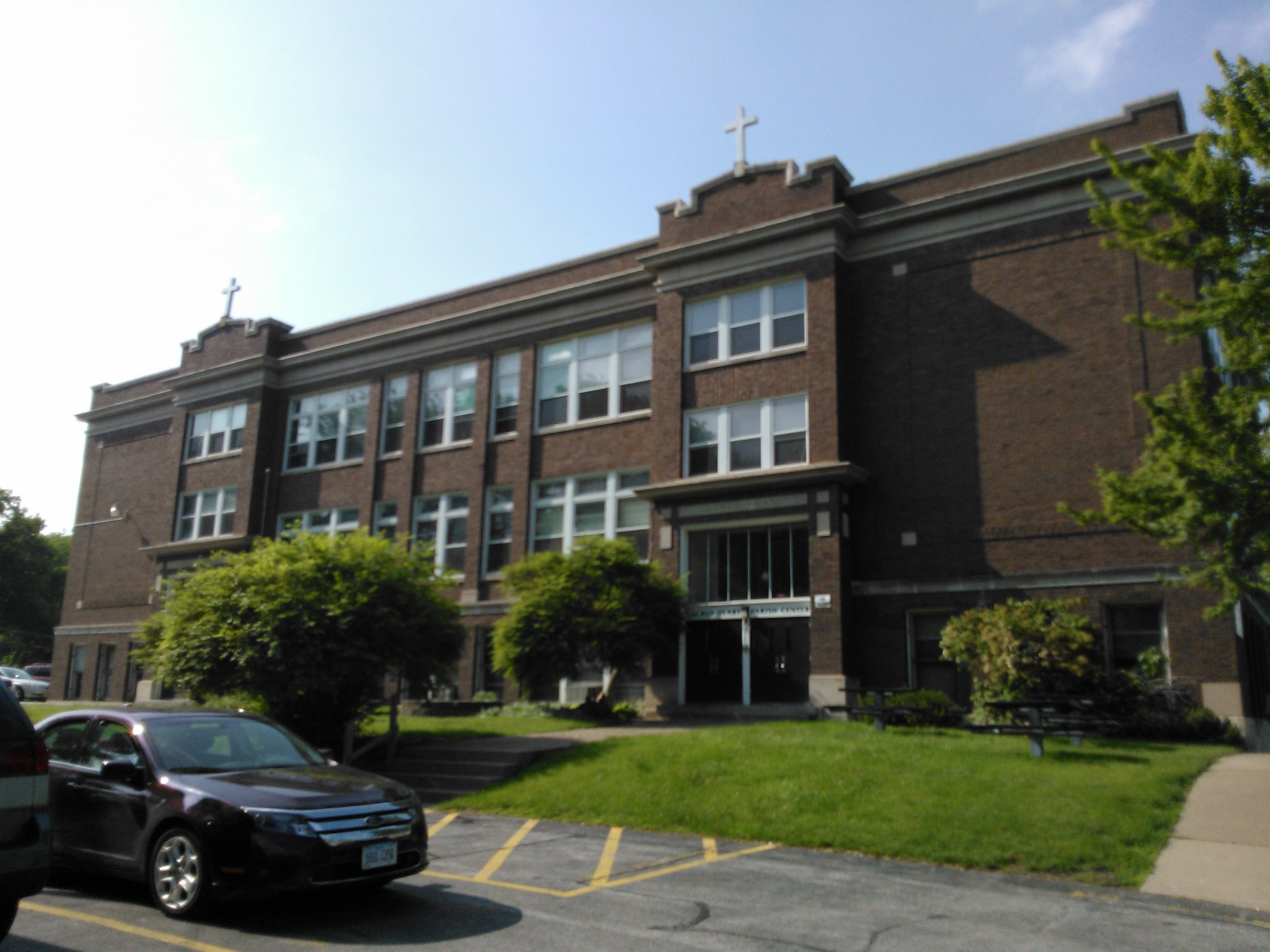
Sacred Heart School

The parish school was established in 1859 in a frame building that was first used as the parish rectory. This building was enlarged for more classroom space and for living quarters for the Sisters of Charity of the Blessed Virgin Mary who began teaching in the school in 1861. In the school's early years there was usually a layman who taught the older boys in addition to the Sisters. Among them was M.V. Gannon who would go on to become an attorney of some merit. A new brick school building was built between 1870 and 1871.

In September 1882 Bishop McMullen established St. Ambrose Seminary and Academy, now known as St. Ambrose University, using two classrooms at St Margaret's School. He assigned the Rev. A.J. Schulte, St. Margaret's assistant pastor, as the school's first president and instructor of the classics. St. Ambrose moved to its current location on Locust Street in 1885.

During Father Davis' pastorate, a high school program for girls was begun and lasted for about ten years. Most of the girls spent a year or two in the program before they dropped out and went to work. The first two girls who completed the four-year course graduated in 1902. The Rev. John Flannagan discontinued the high school program when he was the pastor because of his ties with Immaculate Conception Academy.

The third school building was constructed in 1914 for $104,093.44. Bishop Davis dedicated the building on January 17, 1915. It was designed by Davenport architect Arthur Ebeling. During the pastorate of Msgr. Mottet in the 1990s the parish school merged with St. Alphonsus School in the west end for several years and formed John Paul Academy. Both parishes then continued to sponsor their own schools until 2004 when it was no longer feasible to operate separate schools. Once again the parishes joined and with Holy Family School in central Davenport to form All Saints School. The former Holy Family School building was used by the school. Parish-based religious education classes were held in the Sacred Heart School building until it was torn down in the summer of 2017. A ceremony was held before the demolition.

== Pastors/Rectors ==
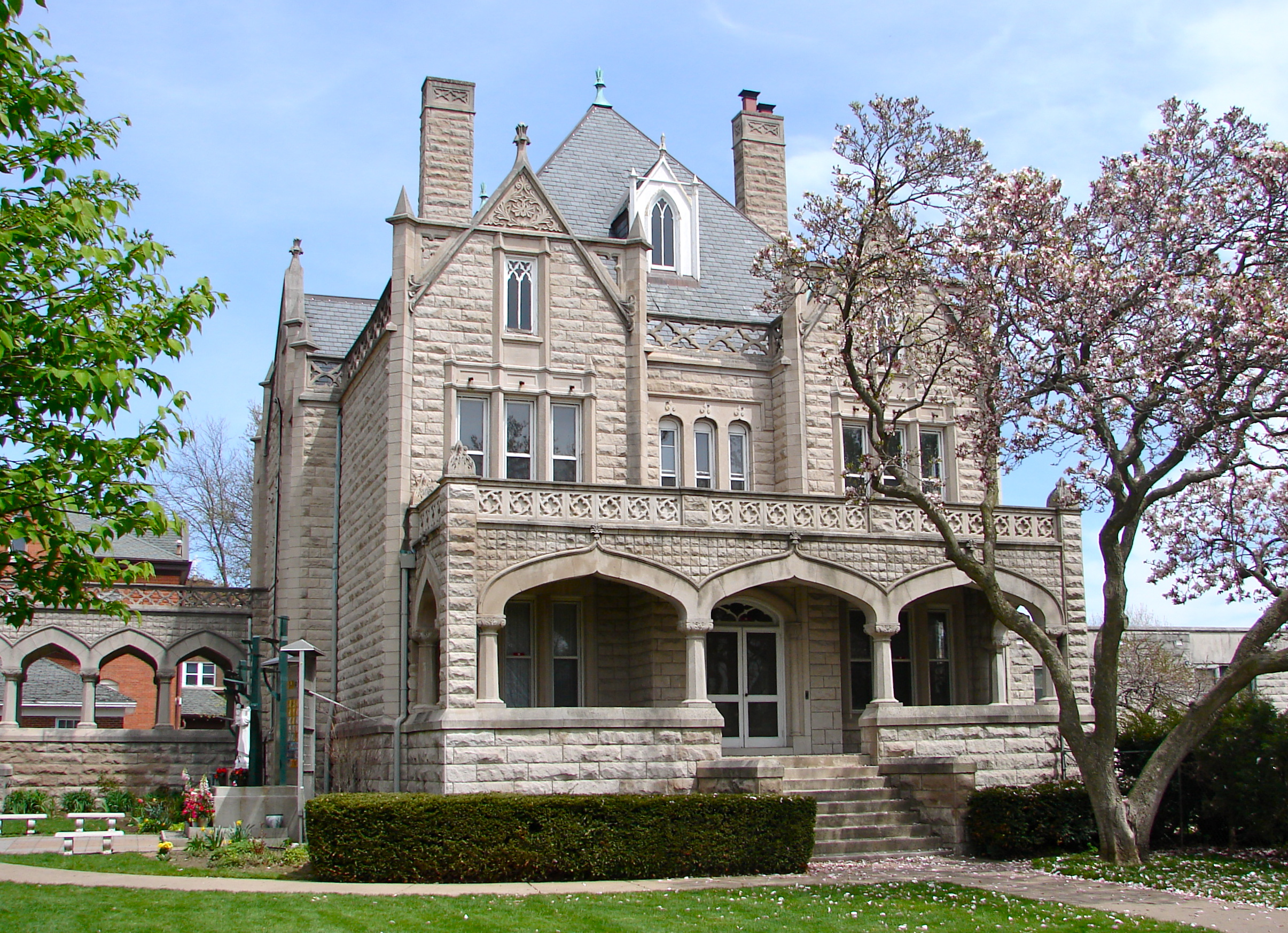
Sacred Heart Rectory

The following priests have served both St. Margaret's and Sacred Heart as its pastor. Since 1881 they have also served as cathedral rector:

- Rev. Andrew Trevis (1856–1861)
- Rev. Henry Cosgrove (1861–1884)
- Rev. Andrew Trevis (1884–1889)
- Rev. James Davis (1889–1906)
- Rev. John Flannagan (1907–1926)
- Msgr. Francis Leonard (1926–1932)
- Msgr. William Shannahan (1932–1937)
- Msgr. Martin Cone (1937–1953)
- Msgr. Thomas Feeney (1953–1968)
- Msgr. Ralph Thompson (1968–1971)
- Msgr. Sebastian Menke (1973–1986)
- Msgr. Marvin Mottet (1986–2005)
- Rev. Robert Busher (2005–2010)
- Msgr. Robert Gruss (2010–2011)
- Rev. Richard Adam (2011–2021)
- Rev. Thomas Hennen (2021–2025)
- Rev. Jason Crossen (2025–present)

== Pipe organ ==
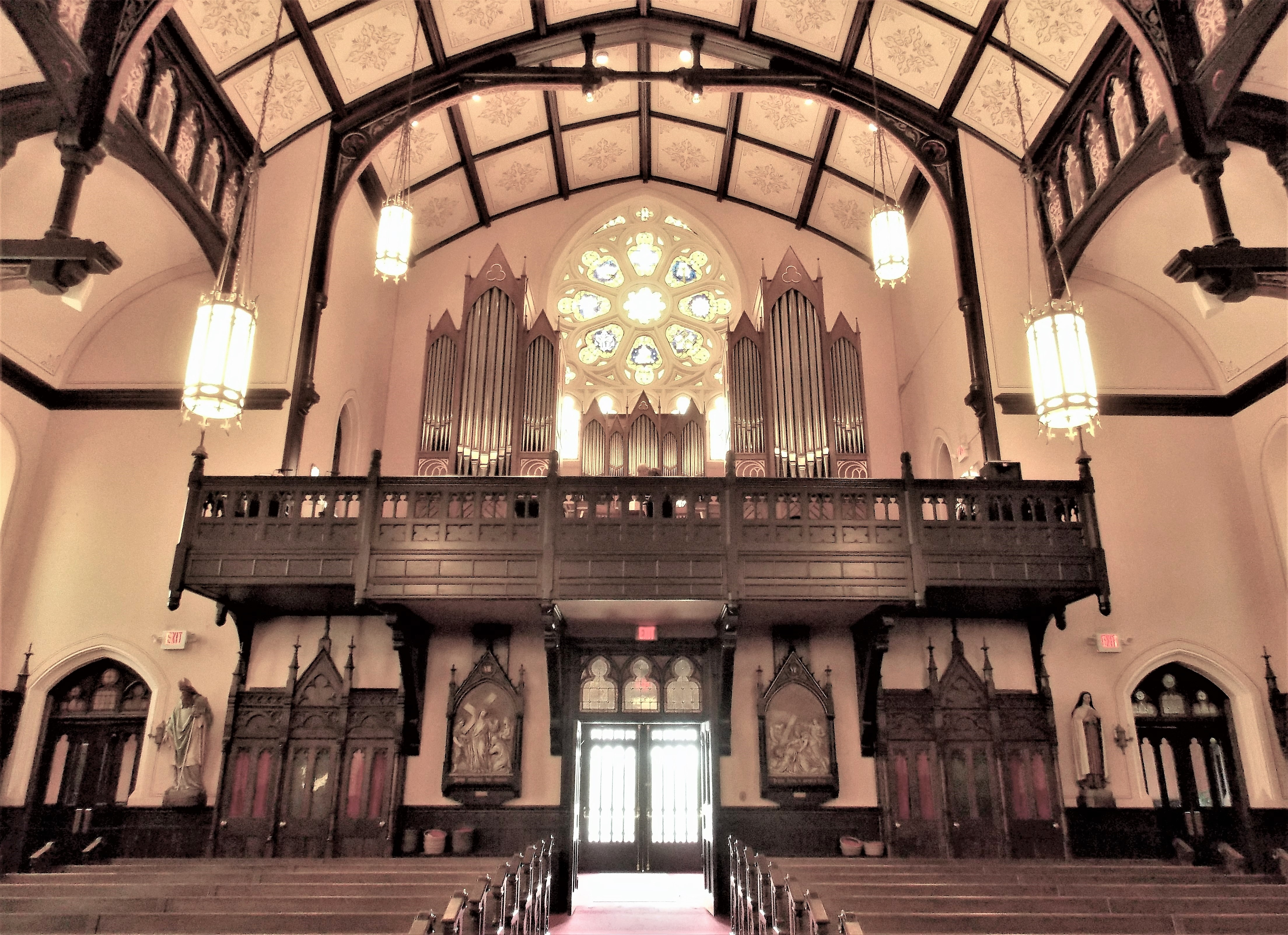
Noack pipe organ, opus 119

The original pipe organ built in the cathedral had been moved from St. Margaret's Cathedral. It had been donated by Antoine LeClaire. It was replaced in September 1895 by a new instrument arraigned for by Father Davis at a cost of $3,000. Therese Laurent, the cathedral's organist, and the cathedral choir gave a concert of sacred music to dedicate the new organ. Plans to replace that organ began as early as 1944. In 1949 the Kilgen Organ Company approached Msgr. Martin Cone about the possibility of installing an instrument that was intended for St. Rita's Church in Chicago. Construction on their new church had been delayed and so the organ, which was already being built, could be installed in Sacred Heart instead. The offer was accepted and the new pipe organ was installed for $27,000. The Rev. James Greene from St. Ambrose Academy gave a dedicatory concert. The old Kilgen pipe organ was removed in 1991, and replaced with a new Noack pipe organ, opus 119. It was first used for the Silver Jubilee of Bishop Gerald O'Keefe as bishop of Davenport on January 29, 1992.

The organ is located in the rear gallery of the cathedral. Some of the pipes are exposed in three cases. It features a traditional style console with the mechanical action console detached from the main case. It is equipped with slider chests, mechanical key action, and electric stop action. There are two manuals, 35 stops, 35 ranks, the manual compass is 61 notes, and the pedal compass is 32 notes. The drawknobs are in horizontal rows on terraced/stepped jambs. It features balanced swell shoes/pedals with standard AGO placement. The combination action is a computerized/digital system. It includes an AGO Standard (concave radiating) pedalboard, combination action thumb pistons, and combination action toe studs.

Stoplist:

GREAT ORGAN

- 16 Double Diapason
- 8 Diapason
- 8 Second Diapason
- 8 Chimney Flute
- 4 Octave
- 4 Harmonic Flute
- 2-2/3 Twelfth
- 2 Fifteenth
- 1-3/5 Seventeenth
- 1-1/3 Mixture IV
- 8 Trumpet
- 4 Clarion

SWELL ORGAN

- 16 Bourdon
- 8 Diapason
- 8 Bell Gamba
- 8 Gedackt
- 8 Celeste
- 4 Prestant
- 4 Recorder
- 2 Gemshorn
- 2-2/3 Sesquialtera II
- 2 Mixture IV
- 16 Bassoon
- 8 Oboe

PEDAL ORGAN

- 32 GrandBourdon
- 16 Violone
- 16 Open Wood
- 16 Stopt Bass
- 8 Diapason
- 8 Gedackt
- 4 Choral Bass
- 2-2/3 Mixture IV
- 16 Trombone
- 8 Trumpet
- 4 Trumpet

== See also ==
- List of Catholic cathedrals in the United States
- List of cathedrals in the United States
