= John McMullen (bishop) =

Irish-born prelate (1832–1883)

His Excellency, The Right Reverend John McMullen
- Bishop of Davenport
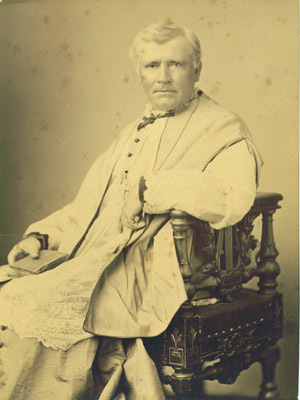
- Church: Roman Catholic Church
- See: Diocese of Davenport
- Appointed: May 8, 1881
- In office: July 25, 1881— July 4, 1883
- Predecessor: None
- Successor: Henry Cosgrove
- Previous posts: Administrator, Diocese of Chicago (1877–1878)

Orders
- Ordination: June 20, 1858 by Antonio Ligi-Bussi
- Consecration: July 25, 1881 by Patrick Feehan

Personal details
- Born: January 8, 1832 Ballynahinch, County Down, Ireland
- Died: July 4, 1883 (aged 51) Davenport, Iowa, US
- Motto: In te Domine speravi (In thee, O Lord, have I hoped)

John McMullen (January 8, 1832 – July 4, 1883) was an Irish-born bishop of the Catholic Church. He served as the first bishop of the Diocese of Davenport in Iowa from 1881 to until his death in 1883.

== Biography ==
=== Early life ===
John McMullen was born in Ballynahinch, County Down, Ireland, to James and Alice (Fitzsimmons) McMullen, and was one of ten children. When he was one year old, the McMullen family immigrated to Canada. In 1837, they moved to Ogdensburg, New York, and later to Chicago, Illinois.

McMullen was educated in the Chicago Public Schools and then in parochial schools. He received his secondary and undergraduate studies at the University of St. Mary of the Lake in Chicago, graduating in 1852. McMullen then went to Rome to study at College of the Propaganda and the Pontifical Urban College, where he received a Doctor of Divinity degree.

=== Priesthood ===
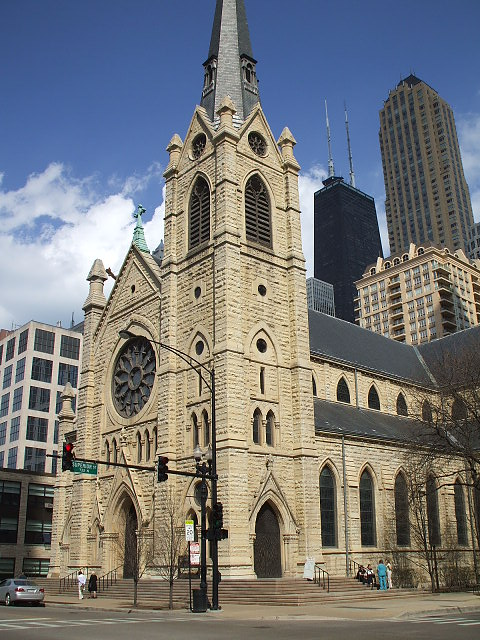
Holy Name Cathedral, Chicago, Illinois (2007)

McMullen was ordained to the priesthood in Rome by Archbishop Antonio Ligi-Bussi on June 20, 1858, for the Diocese of Chicago.

After returning to Chicago, McMullen was assigned as an assistant pastor at St. Mary's Cathedral Parish. During this time, he helped to establish the House of the Good Shepherd in Chicago, which cared for female former prostitutes. He also established orphanages for both boys and girls. McMullen would solicit contributions door to door to support theses institutions. He was a frequent visitor to the Cook County Jail and Bridewell House of Corrections, bringing newspapers and other reading material to the inmates.

From 1861 to 1866, McMullen served as president of University of St. Mary of the Lake, building facilities for the school. In 1865 he established the short-lived Catholic Monthly magazine at the school. Due to lack of funding, the university closed in 1866, leaving only the seminary open. Mullen was then appointed as the founding pastor for both St. Louis and St. Paul's Parishes in Chicago.

McMullen accompanied Bishop James Duggan in 1866 as one of his theologians to the Second Council of Baltimore. When Duggan's mental state started to deteriorate, McMullen traveled to the Vatican in 1868 as a representative of the diocesan clergy to inform the pope. He was named the pastor of St. Rose of Lima Parish in Wilmington, Illinois, and started a new parish in Braidwood, Illinois.

McMullen was named pastor of Holy Name Parish in Chicago and spent $19,000 on renovations. On October 8, 1871, the Great Chicago Fire destroyed the cathedral and every structure that McMullen had built in Chicago, including Holy Name Church. After the fire, McMullen and other Chicago priests traveled across the United States and Canada fundraising to rebuild Chicago's churches and assist the fire victims. He then built the present Holy Name Cathedral, which was consecrated on November 21, 1875. In 1877, McMullen was named vicar general by Bishop Thomas Foley. After Foley's death, McMullen was named administrator of the diocese; he was renamed vicar general after the installation of Archbishop Patrick Feehan.

=== Bishop of Davenport ===
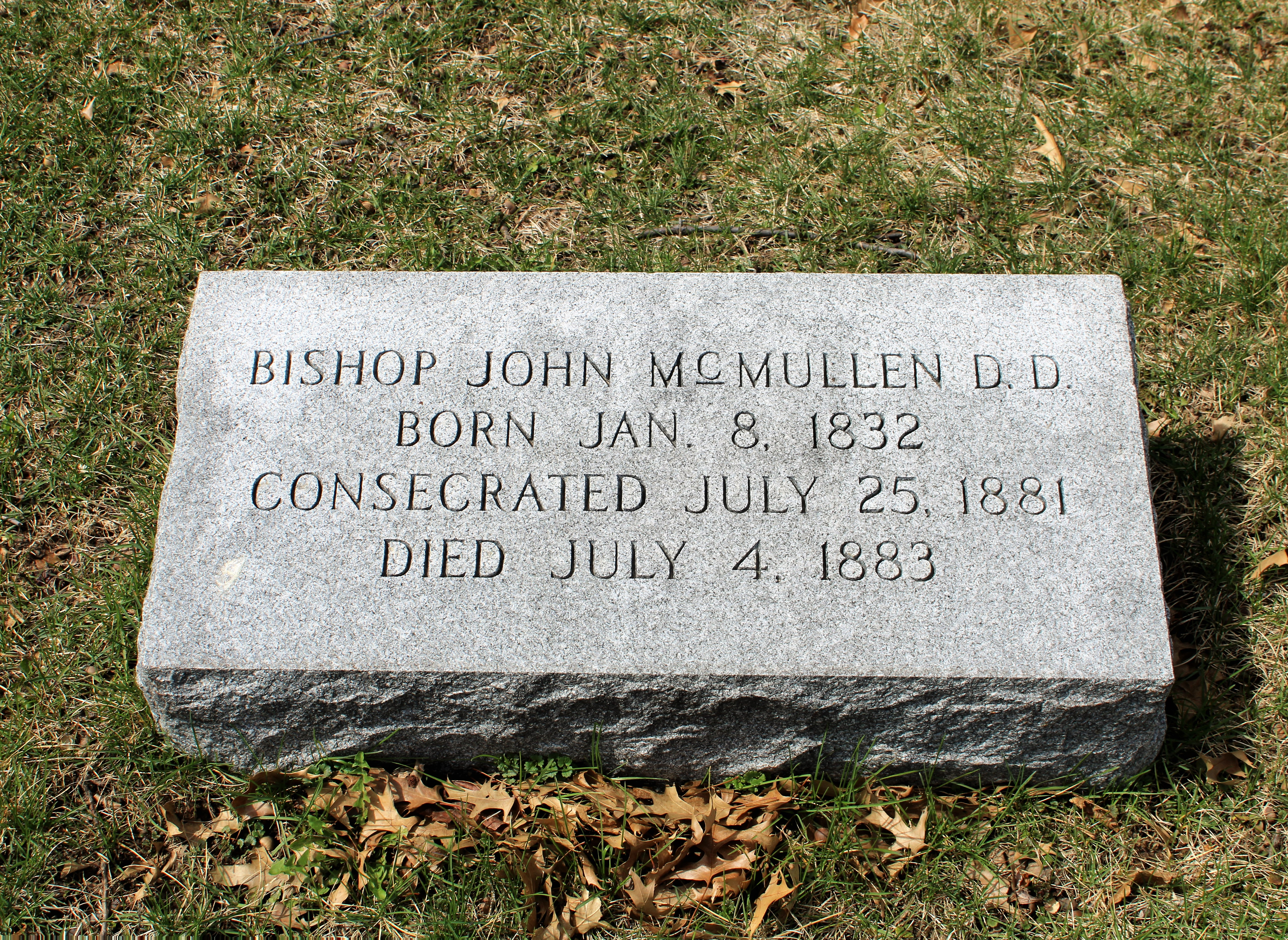
Bishop McMullen's grave, Mt. Calvary Cemetery, Davenport, Iowa (2022)

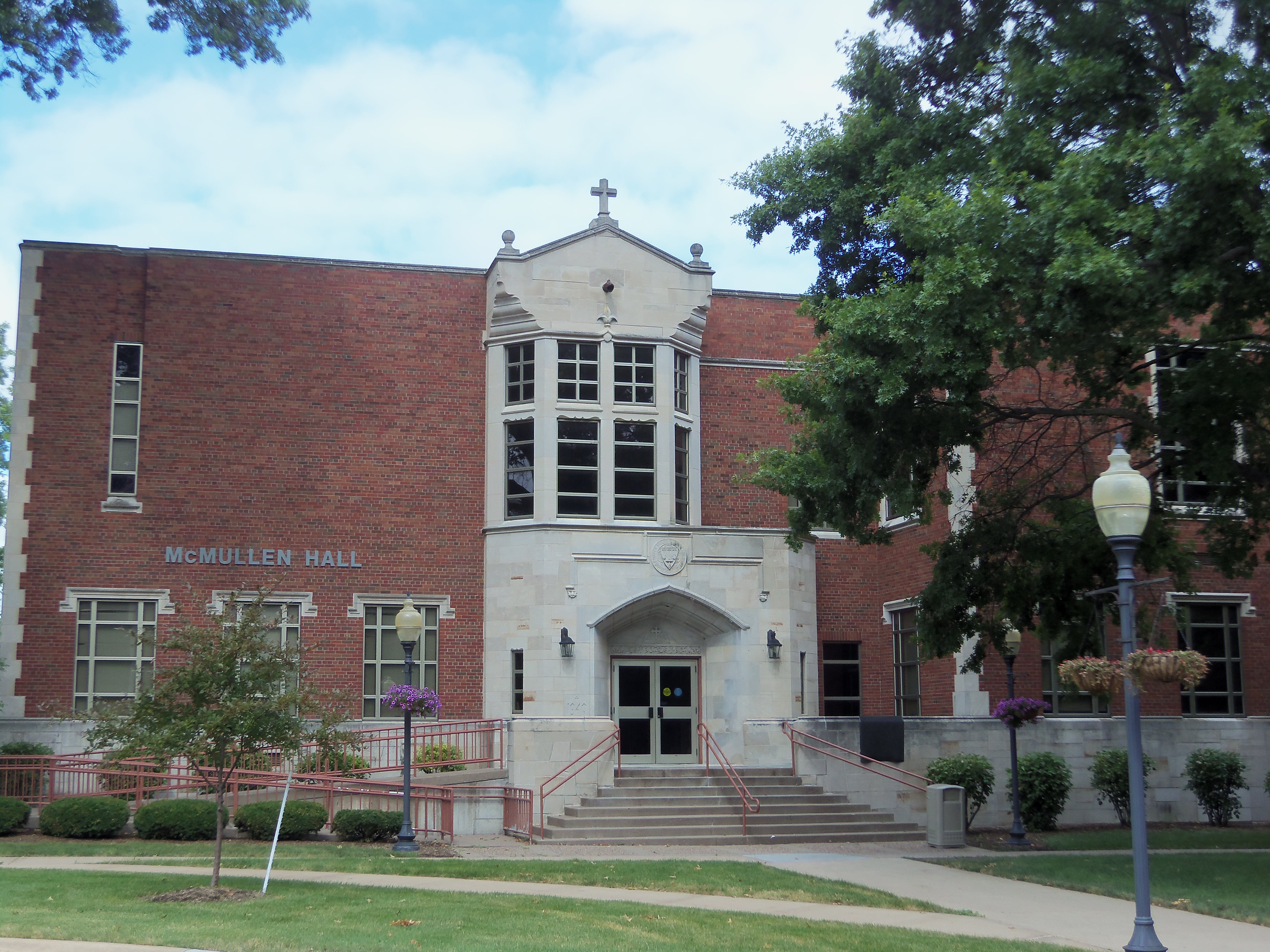
McMullen Hall at St. Ambrose University, Davenport, Iowa (2013)

On May 8, 1881, McMullen was appointed the first bishop of the newly created Diocese of Davenport. He was consecrated bishop by Archbishop Feehan on July 25, 1881, in Holy Name Cathedral. The principal co-consecrators were Bishops John Hennessy and John Spalding.

As bishop, McMullen chose St. Margaret's Church in Davenport to be the new cathedral. He did not own his own episcopal insignia or robes, but used those of the late Bishop Foley. Soon after arriving in Davenport, McMullen went to visit the parishes in his diocese. He traveled by stagecoach, buggy, lumber wagon, hand car and passenger coach on the train. While on visitation, he administered the sacrament of confirmation. By December 1881, McMullen had confirmed over 7,000 people, and by the end of 1882, the number had risen to 13,000.

McMullen called the diocese's first synod in 1882 to set its procedures and regulations. In September 1882, he founded St. Ambrose, a seminary and school of commerce for young men in Davenport. It is today St. Ambrose University. McMullen's health soon failed, however. He attempted to travel to Rome for medical treatment, but was too sick to sail out of New York City. He also traveled to California, where he fell gravely ill.

=== Death and legacy ===
On July 4, 1883, John McMullen died from stomach cancer in Davenport, having served as bishop for less than two years.

Archbishop Feehan celebrated the requiem mass for McMullen and Bishop Spalding preached the sermon. McMullen was initially buried in the crypt of St. Margaret's Cathedral, but his body was transferred to the crypt of Sacred Heart Cathedral after it was built. His remains were eventually moved to the Bishop's Circle of Mt. Calvary Cemetery in Davenport. McMullen Hall, a classroom building at St. Ambrose, was named in his honor.
