= Henry Cosgrove =

American bishop (1834–1906)

His Excellency, The Right Reverend Henry Cosgrove D.D.
- Bishop of Davenport
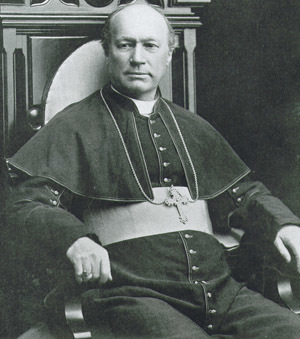
- Church: Roman Catholic Church
- Appointed: July 11, 1884
- In office: September 14, 1884 – December 23, 1906
- Predecessor: John McMullen
- Successor: James J. Davis
- Previous posts: Administrator, Diocese of Davenport (1883–1884)

Orders
- Ordination: August 27, 1857 by Clement Smyth
- Consecration: September 14, 1884 by Patrick Feehan

Personal details
- Born: December 19, 1834 Williamsport, Pennsylvania, US
- Died: December 23, 1906 (aged 72) Davenport, Iowa, US

Henry Cosgrove (December 19, 1834 – December 23, 1906) was a late 19th-century and early 20th-century bishop of the Catholic Church in the United States. He served as the second bishop of Diocese of Davenport in Iowa from 1884 to until his death in 1906.

== Biography ==
=== Early life ===
Henry Cosgrove was born in Williamsport, Pennsylvania, on December 19, 1834, to John and Bridget Cosgrove, both Irish immigrants. The family moved to Hollidaysburg, Pennsylvania, and then to Dubuque, Iowa, in 1845. Cosgrove first studied with Reverend Joseph Cretin, then vicar general of the Diocese of Dubuque. Cosgrove then attended St. Mary's Seminary in Perry County, Missouri, for the classics, and the seminary at Carondelet, Missouri, for theology.

=== Priesthood ===
==== Diocese of Dubuque ====
Cosgrove was ordained a priest by Bishop Clement Smyth on August 27, 1857, for the Diocese of Dubuque. After his ordination, Cosgrove was assigned as an assistant pastor at St. Margaret's Parish in Davenport, Iowa, then part of the diocese. He was named pastor there in 1861.

In 1873, an arsonist set a fire on the altar in St. Margaret's Church. During the confusion, Cosgrove took a blow to the head after running into a doorway. The fire damage was confined to the altar; the arsonist was never apprehended.

In an early morning of March 1878, three men broke into St. Margaret's Church. Their goal was to steal the collection from the Forty Hours' Devotion that was collected in the previous service. During the break in, one man shot at Cosgrove while he was in bed, missing him. The burglars fled the church without the collection. A $3,000 reward was offered for their capture. All three men were ultimately arrested, convicted and sent to Anamosa State Penitentiary in Anamosa, Iowa.

==== Diocese of Davenport ====
In 1881, Pope Leo XIII split the Diocese of Dubuque, creating a new Diocese of Davenport with Reverend John McMullen as its first bishop. Cosgrove was incardinated, or transferred, to the new diocese on June 4, 1881. St. Margaret's was elevated to a cathedral and Cosgrove became the cathedral's rector. McMullen named him as the first vicar general of the diocese.

After the death of Bishop McMullen on July 4, 1883, the Vatican named Cosgrove as the diocesan administration. When the diocese sent a list of possible candidates for bishop to the Vatican, Cosgrove's name, despite being vicar general, was missing. This omission was allegedly the work of priests from Des Moines, Iowa, who still wanted it to be the see city instead of Davenport. However, after Cosgrove's supporters learned of this maneuver, they persuaded the Vatican to wait on an appointment until it received a petition from the clergy that favored Cosgrove.

=== Bishop of Davenport ===
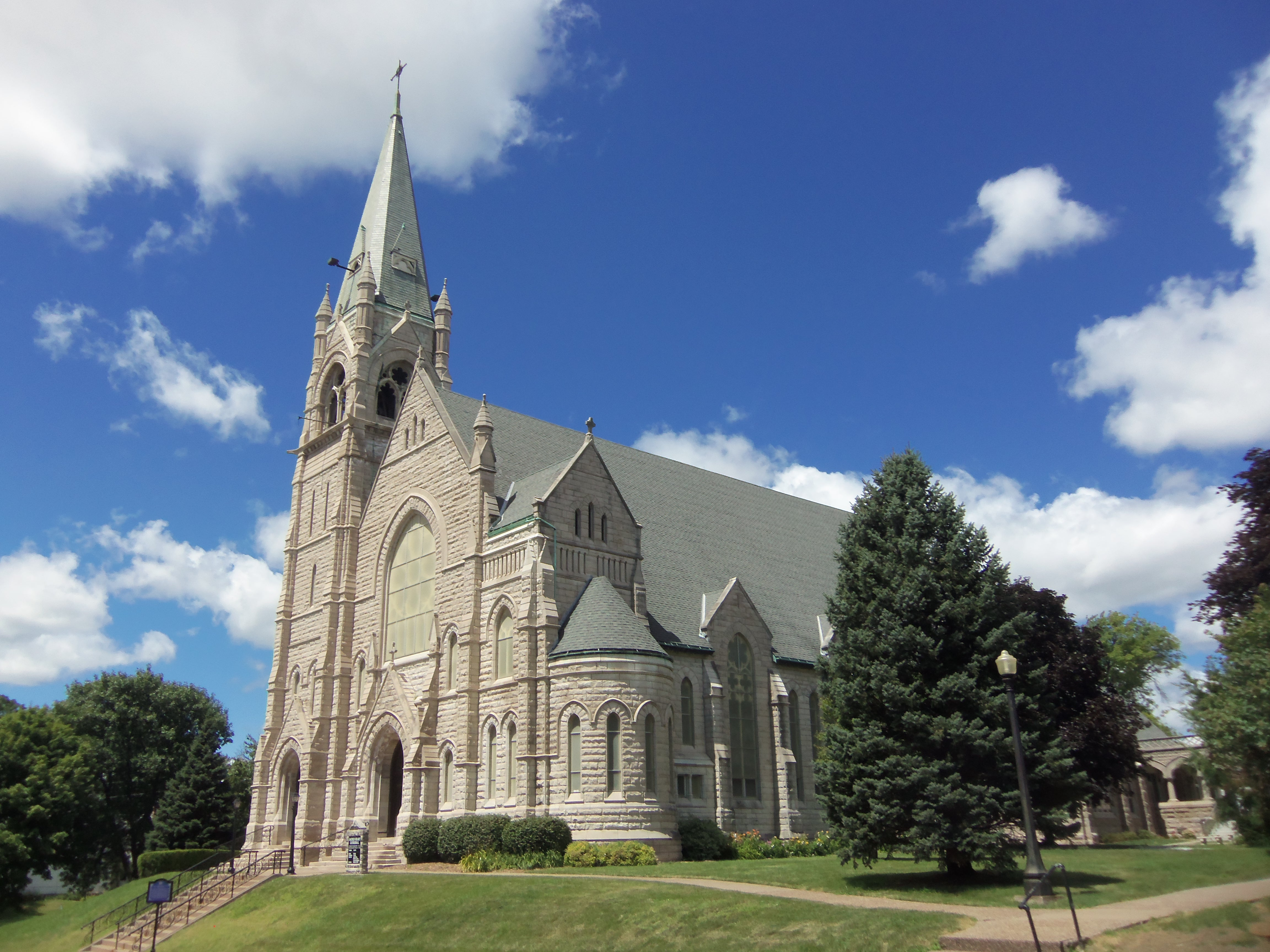
Sacred Heart Cathedral, Davenport, Iowa (2013)

Cosgrove was appointed the second bishop of Davenport on July 11, 1884, by Pope Leo XIII. He was consecrated in St. Margaret's Cathedral on September 14, 1884, by Archbishop Patrick Feehan of Chicago. Bishops John Hennessy of Dubuque and James O'Connor, the vicar apostolic of Nebraska, were the principal co-consecrators.

Cosgrove was a friend of Archbishop John Ireland and was aligned with the more progressive wing of the American hierarchy. While the diocese had no newspaper at the time, the periodical Iowa Orphan's Friend reported on Cosgrove's activities and published his pastoral letters. It was sort of a "house organ" for the bishop.

In 1884, Cosgrove attended the Third Plenary Council of Baltimore, which established the Baltimore Catechism. Deciding that St. Margaret's was no longer adequate as a cathedral function, Cosgrove constructed Sacred Heart Cathedral in 1891 to replace it. Cosgrove established St. Vincent's Home for orphans in 1895 in Davenport by the Congregation of the Humility of Mary in 1896.

Cosgrove supported the national Temperance Movement, a popular movement against alcohol abuse, and called for a moral crusade in the diocese, especially in Davenport. In 1903. he was quoted in the national media calling Davenport "the wicked city of its size in America". This was because of its notorious Bucktown District, an area of speakeasies and brothels that was close to St. Margaret's.

On October 7, 1904, at Cosgrove's request, Pope Pius X named Reverend James J. Davis as coadjutor bishop of the diocese. Cosgrove presided over the diocese's second synod the same year

=== Death and legacy ===
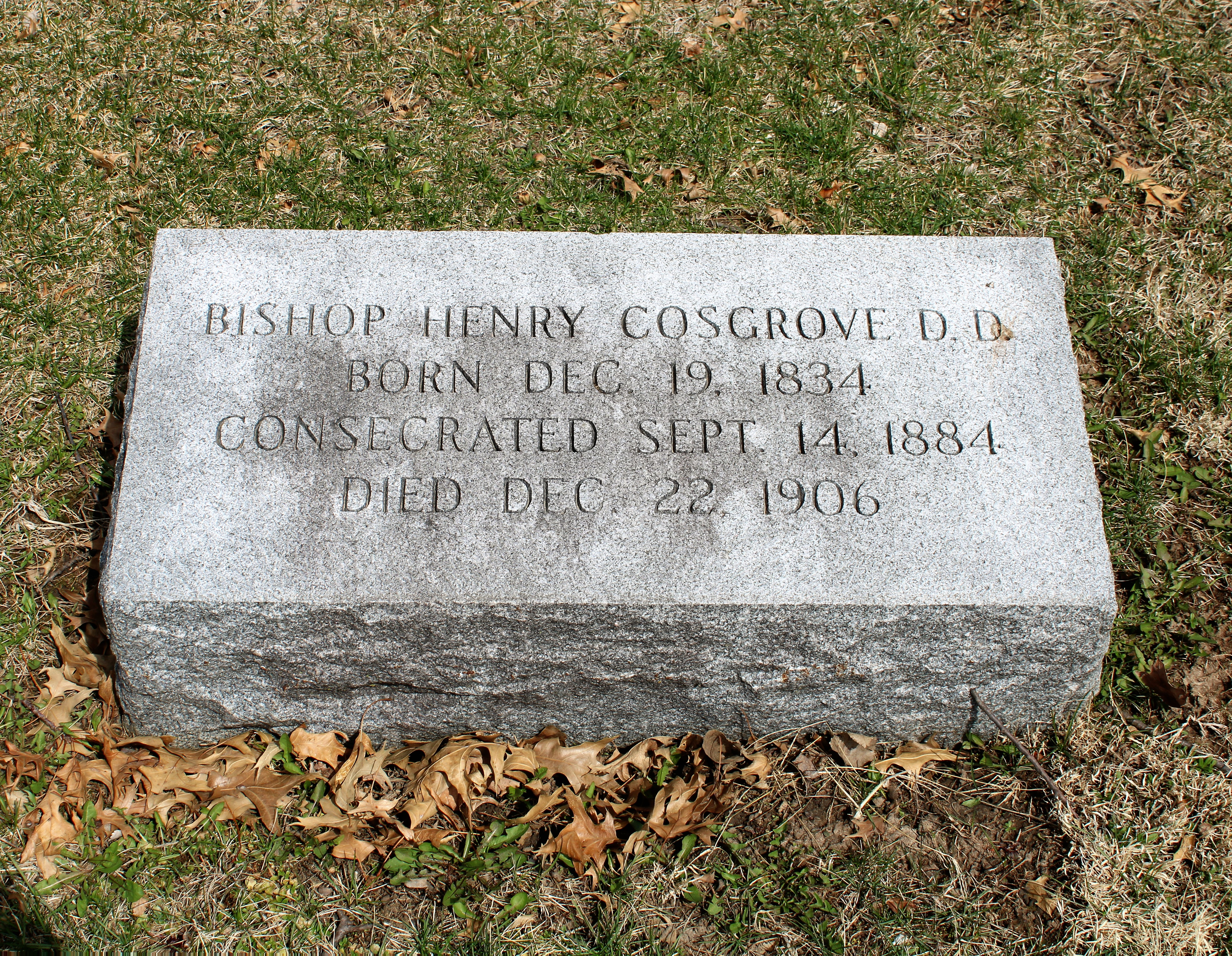
Bishop Cosgrove's grave, Mt. Calvary Cemetery, Davenport, Iowa (2022)

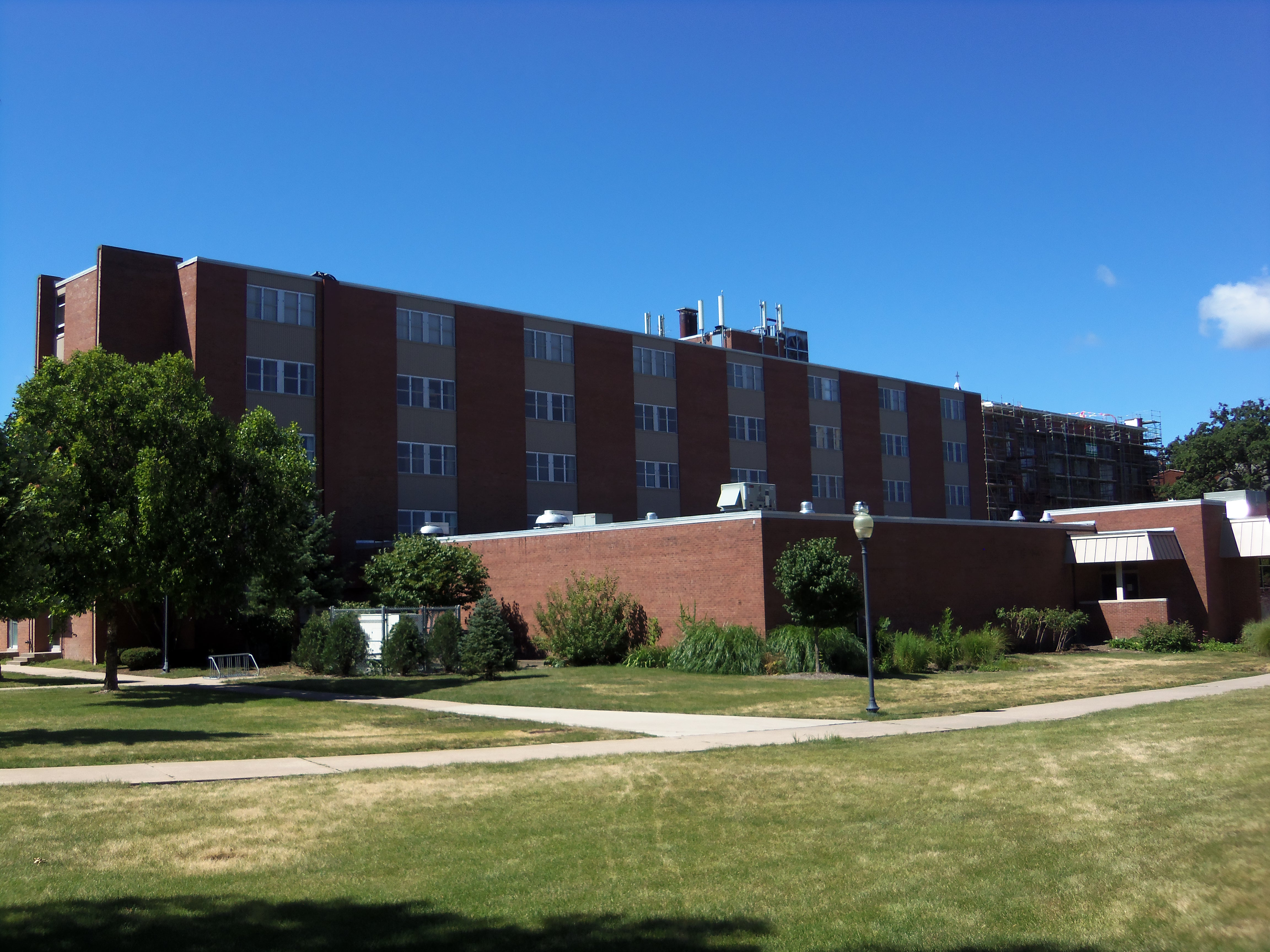
Cosgrove Hall, St. Ambrose University, Davenport, Iowa (2013)

Henry Cosgrove died of cancer on December 23, 1906, in Davenport at age 72. After his funeral, Cosgrove was interred in the cathedral crypt. His remains were later moved to Mt. Calvary Cemetery in Davenport when the diocese abandoned the crypt.

Cosgrove was the first native born bishop of the United States appointed to a see west of the Mississippi River. Cosgrove Hall, a residence hall at St. Ambrose University in Davenport, Iowa, is named in his honor.
