= Ambrose Hall =

- U.S. National Register of Historic Places
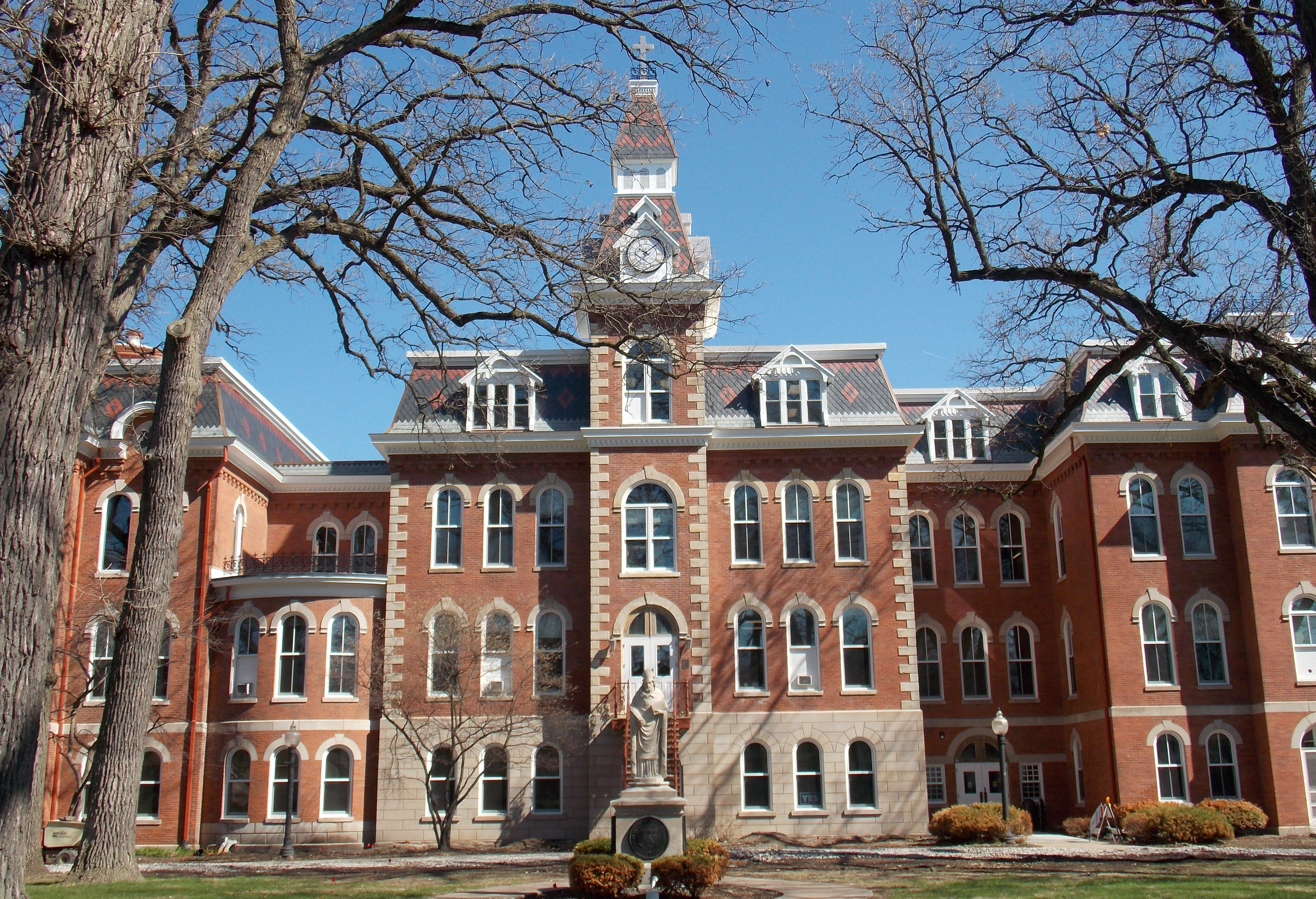
- Ambrose Hall in 2014

- Location within Iowa Location within the United States
- Location: 518 W. Locust St. Davenport, Iowa
- Coordinates: 41°32′20″N 90°34′51″W
- Area: 1 acre (0.40 ha)
- Built: 1885-1912
- Architect: Victor Huot
- Architectural style: Second Empire
- NRHP reference No.: 77000553
- Added to NRHP: April 11, 1977

Ambrose Hall, located in Davenport, Iowa, United States, is the first building constructed on the campus of St. Ambrose University. It was listed on the National Register of Historic Places in 1977.

== History ==
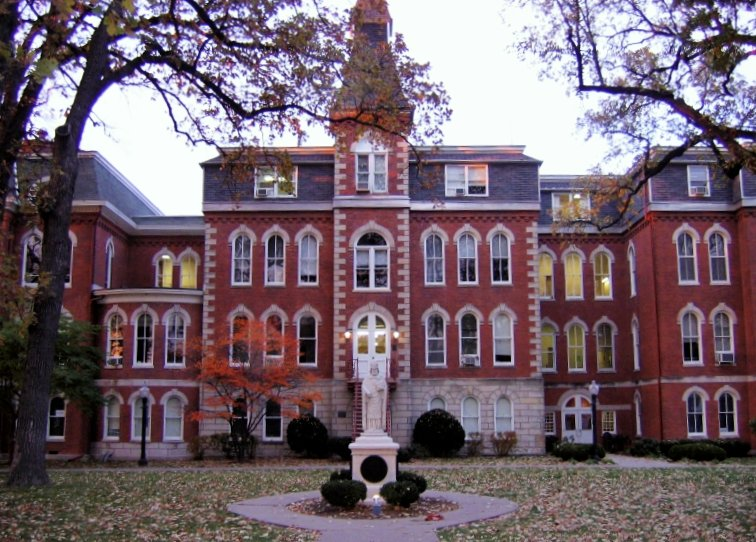
Ambrose Hall before 2013 renovation

St. Ambrose University was founded in 1882 by John McMullen, the first bishop of the Catholic Diocese of Davenport. The school initially held classes in two classrooms in the school building at St. Margaret's Cathedral. The desire, however, was for the school to have a campus and a building of its own.

The school was formally incorporated as a "seminary" in 1885, however, its mission was never exclusively considered as a place that trained future priests. Instead, it was considered a "Catholic school for advanced studies". Courses were taught in the humanities, sciences and in business as well as theology. The school, in a sense, pioneered the concept of educating future priests and allowing them to reside with young men who they might serve one day as their parish priests. It was typical at that time to cloister seminarians at an early age away and educating them separately from other people. The institution's name was changed to St. Ambrose College in 1908 and St. Ambrose University in 1987.

Bishop Henry Cosgrove, McMullen's successor, initially chose the corner of Eighth and Ripley Streets as the new location for the school, as it would be convenient for the day students. However, others suggested Noel's Grove along Locust Street as a possible location. Cosgrove was familiar with the location as he had held parish picnics at the location when he was the pastor at St. Margaret's. He was concerned that the location was too isolated and inaccessible, and Locust Street was not a decent roadway. In the end, convinced that the location was accessible by way of the Brady Streetcar line, Cosgrove bought Noel's Grove. The cost for purchasing the property and building the central section of the building amounted to $20,000. Aloysius Schulte, the college president, and James Davis, the cathedral rector, toured the diocese to solicit funds for the project.

Victor Huot was chosen as the architect for a new building. Previously he had designed St. Joseph's and St. Mary's churches and Mercy Hospital; all in Davenport. He also designed the building for the Immaculate Conception Academy in Davenport. Both Ambrose Hall and the academy building were designed in the Second Empire style, and they were designed so they could be built in stages over a period of time. Huot designed the first two additions to the building at the same time he designed the original tower section.

The cornerstone for the building was laid on July 5, 1885. The central section of Ambrose Hall, with the entrance tower and spire, was the first section built. It had space for 75 boarding students as well as office space and classrooms. The Congregation of the Humility of Mary was placed in charge of the dining room, cooking, and housekeeping. The structure was expanded in 1887, 1893, 1901, 1908, and 1912. The building is constructed of yellow stone and red brick with marble and stone trim. A mansard roof, typical of the Second Empire style, rings the structure on all its additions. The building housed the entire school until 1927 when Davis Hall was built.

An exterior renovation of the building in the 1960s altered the mansard roofline of the central section of the building. The rest of the exterior has remained largely unchanged. The interior of the building has been renovated numerous times depending on the college's needs.

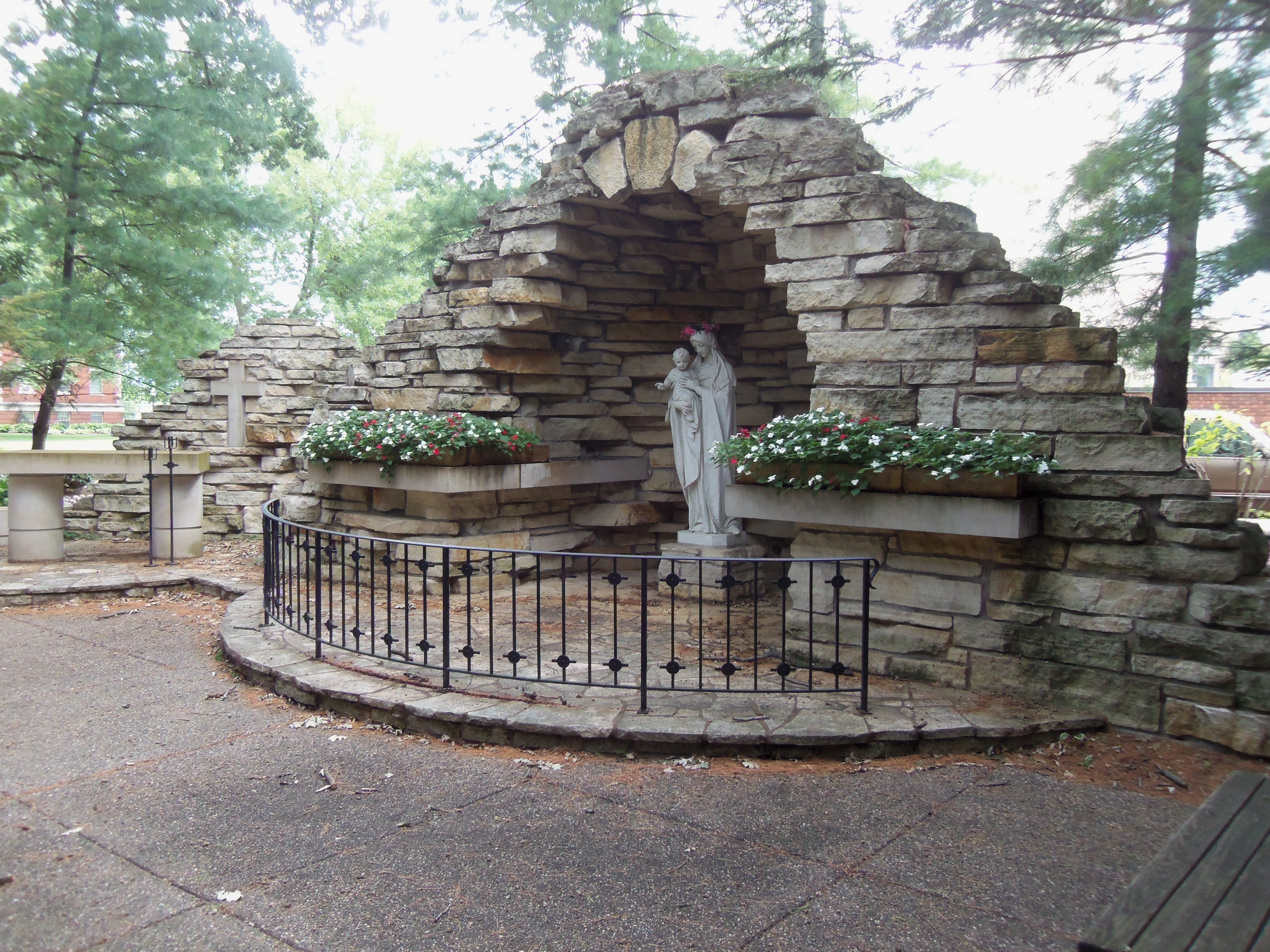
Marian Grotto

A chapel occupied the third and fourth floors of the westernmost section of the building and served the school until construction of Christ the King Chapel in 1952. The space now serves as the boardroom. Ambrose Hall also housed the Seminary Department until Hayes Hall opened in 1967. A grotto with a statue of the Blessed Virgin Mary lies just north of Ambrose Hall. The altar and ambo at the grotto were constructed from the altars that were formerly located in the crypt chapels below Christ the King.

The LeClaire Gym, now known as LeClaire Hall, is attached to the rear of Ambrose Hall and included a swimming pool. It was built during the presidency of William Hannon (1915–1926) and was replaced by Lee Lohman Arena in the 1980s.

Ambrose Hall has served various functions over the years. It has housed classrooms, dormitory, chapel, faculty residence, offices, student union, laundry, and dining facilities. The building now houses offices for admissions, financial aid, student accounts, records and registration, the John R. Lewis Board Room, classrooms, faculty offices, and the student union.

In 2013, the university undertook a $5 million renovation project to bring the building back to its late 19th and early 20th-century appearance. Among other upgrades, the tower and spire were restored along with the bell housed within. A clock depicted in the original plans, but never installed, was added.

== Architecture ==
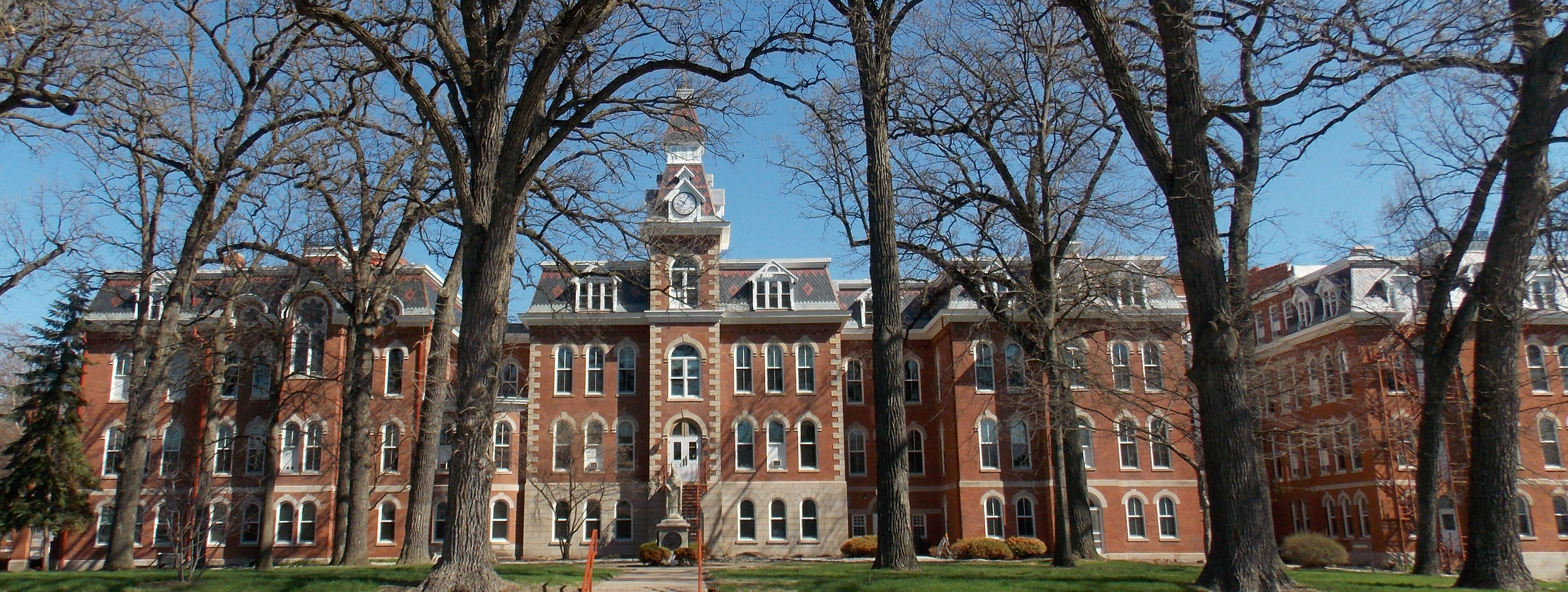
Ambrose Hall in 2014

Ambrose Hall was built in five phases from 1885 to 1912. Each section is similar to the others and yet each section possesses its own character. The features that are common to all the sections include round-arch windows and doorways with stone hood molds and keystones. A stone stringcourse runs between the first and second floors on all but the first section of the building. Finally, decorative brick corbelling runs the length of the whole building below the cornice.

The original section of the building was built from 1885 to 1887. It is a symmetrical structure of seven bays wide with a central pavilion capped by a mansard tower. The lower level is composed of smooth rusticated ashlar and brick on the upper floors with stone quoining on the corners. Its mansard roof was altered in the 1960s when it original diamond-shaped shingles, gabled dormers and decorative cornice were replaced with modern windows, asphalt shingles, and a severely plain cornice. All those features were restored in 2013.

The second section was added to the east of the original section in 1893. It too is symmetrical and has a projecting central pavilion, but it is five bays wide. It is connected to the original section by a three-bay, recessed section. Instead of ashlar on the ground floor, it is all brick from the ground up. Alterations and restoration to its mansard roof were like those of the original section.

The third section was added in 1901 to the west of the original building. Unlike the other sections it has an asymmetrical facade that consists of two symmetrical sections joined together. One section is three bays wide and the other is 5½ bays wide and features a central pavilion. Its mansard roof was altered later. The tracery windows on the third floor mark the room that served as the chapel. The central pavilion has a chapel window that is composed of two trefoil windows that are surmounted by an octofoil window. It is enclosed in a segmental dormer. The two hexafoil windows that flank it are set into the brick below segmental dormers. On the west side of this section is a three-level brick porch.

The fourth section of the building was added to the east in 1908. It reflected a simplified version of the Colonial Revival and therefore did not conform to the design of the other three sections. The fifth section of the building remedied this problem when it was added in 1912 to the front facade of the fourth addition. Its sole purpose was to bring the fourth section into conformity with the rest of the building. Like the second section, it is symmetrical, five bays wide and has a projecting central pavilion. This addition is larger than the other sections as it sits farther in the north in the rear of the building.
