= Victor Huot =

French-born American architect (1822–1904)

- Born: February 17, 1822; Bretonvillers, Doubs, France
- Died: June 1904 (aged 82); Davenport, Iowa, United States
- Education: Polytechnique École in Paris
- Occupation(s): Architect, builder, manufacturer
- Spouse: Marie Favre (m.1854–)
- Children: 2

Victor Huot (February 17, 1822 – June 1904) was a French-born American architect and builder. He was mostly active in Davenport, Iowa, but also worked in New Orleans, Louisiana, and Cleveland, Ohio.

== Biography ==
Victor Huot was born on February 17, 1822, in Bretonvillers, Doubs, France. He was the son of Marie Justin and Jean Baptiste Huot. He studied architecture at École Polytechnique in Paris, and at St. Remy's.

He came to the United States in 1842, initially arriving in Cleveland, Ohio, and moving to New Orleans in 1854. Huot was close with fellow architect T. W. McClelland, and his apprentice of nine years was John Doland. Huot designed Ambrose Hall at 518 West Locust in Davenport, Iowa, as well as St. Joseph's Catholic Church at W. 6th Street and Marquette Street. Both are listed on the National Register of Historic Places.

He established a sash door and blind manufacturing business in Davenport, Iowa. In 1870 he partnered with C. G. Hipwell to do slate roof work.

On May 30, 1904, Huot fell from a shed roof and suffered from a head injury, and died either a few hours, or a days later, the sources dispute the exact time of death. He was survived by his wife and two children.

== Work ==
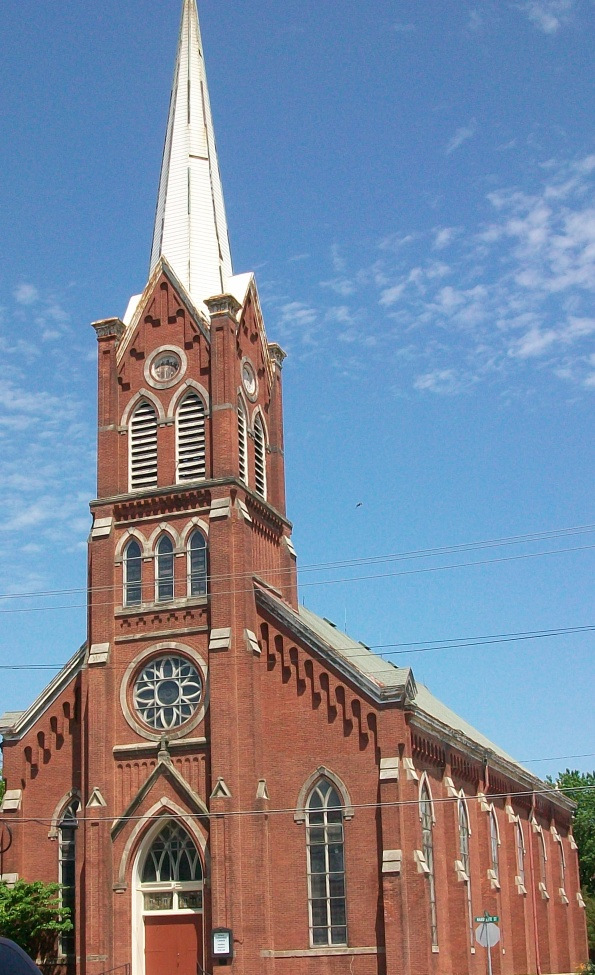
St. Joseph's Catholic Church, Davenport, Iowa, designed by Victor Huot

- St. Mary's Catholic Church (1867), Davenport, Iowa
- St. Joseph's Catholic Church (1881), Davenport, Iowa
- Immaculate Conception Academy (1884), Davenport, Iowa
- St. Anthony's Catholic Church (rear addition; 1886), Davenport, Iowa
- Sacred Heart Cathedral, Davenport, Iowa (supervising architect)
- Ambrose Hall (1885–1912) at St. Ambrose University, Davenport, Iowa
- Huot designed the slate roof only, for the J. Monroe Parker–Ficke House, in the College Square Historic District, Davenport, Iowa
- Grace Episcopal Cathedral, Davenport, Iowa (supervising architect)
- Burtis House
- Sharon residence (Fred B. Sharon House), Cork Hill in Davenport, Iowa
- Sisters Academy, Davenport, Iowa
- Mercy Hospital (original building), Davenport, Iowa
- Rosa Woolmansee residence
- Dessaint–Petersen residence, also known as the W.D. Petersen residence, Davenport, Iowa
- Alibone Morton / Judge Nathaniel French home
