= St. Anthony's Catholic Church (Davenport, Iowa) =

- St. Anthony's Roman Catholic; Church Complex
- U.S. National Register of Historic Places
- U.S. Historic district – Contributing property
- Davenport Register of Historic Properties
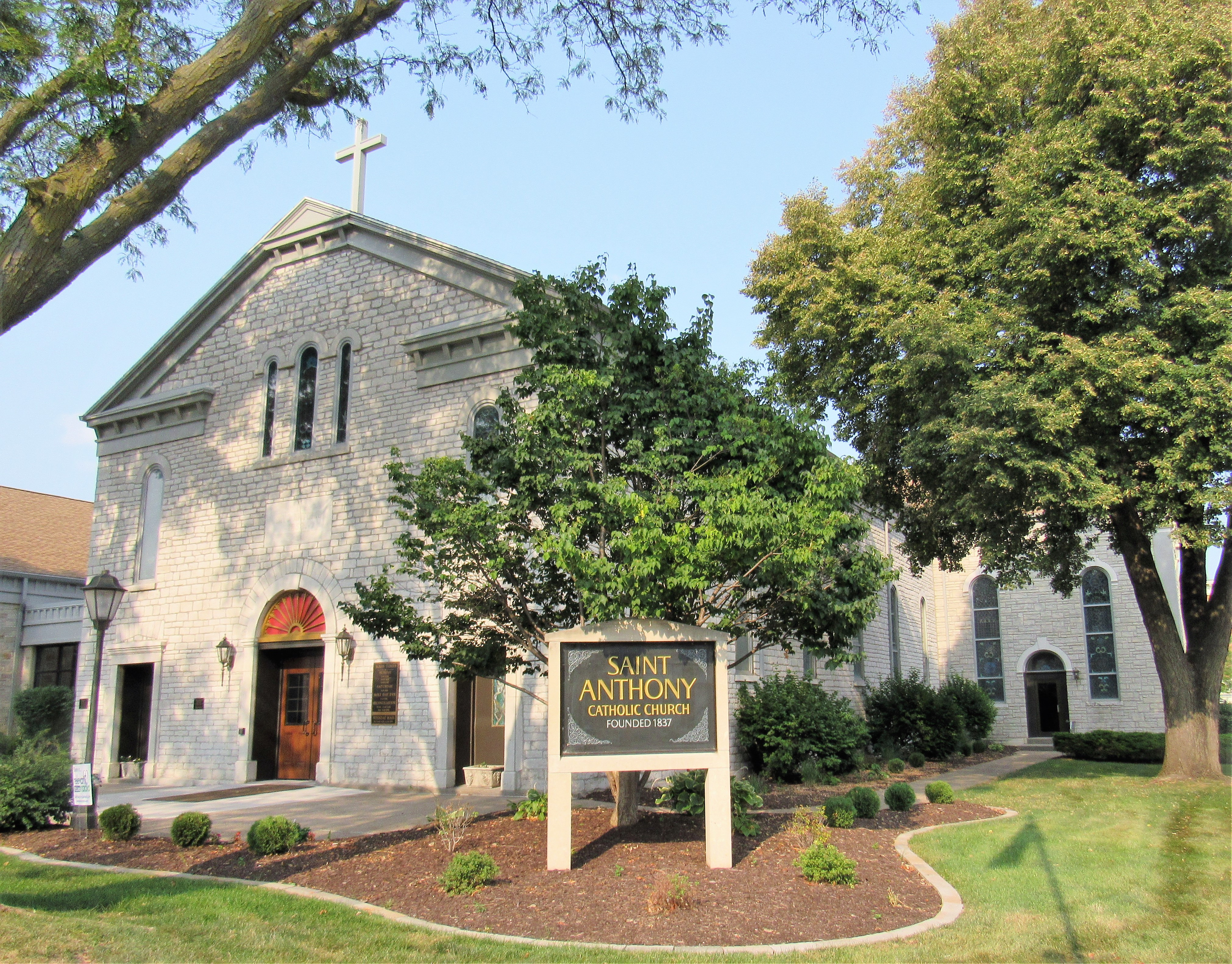
- St. Anthony's Church in 2018

- Location within Iowa Location within the United States
- Location: 407 and 417 Main St. Davenport, Iowa
- Coordinates: 41°31′26″N 90°34′31″W
- Area: 1.4 acres (0.57 ha)
- Built: 1838, 1853
- Built by: Thomas Doyle; Henry Belken
- Architect: Multiple
- Architectural style: Greek Revival
- Part of: Davenport Downtown Commercial Historic District (ID100005546)
- MPS: Davenport MRA
- NRHP reference No.: 84001538
- DRHP No.: 2

Significant dates
- Added to NRHP: April 5, 1984
- Designated DRHP: October 7, 1992

St. Anthony's Catholic Church is a parish church in the Diocese of Davenport. The parish complex is located in downtown Davenport, Iowa, United States, at the corner of Fourth and Main Streets. It is the first church congregation organized in the city of Davenport and the second Catholic congregation, after St. Raphael's in Dubuque, in the state of Iowa. The parish buildings were listed on the National Register of Historic Places as St. Anthony's Roman Catholic Church Complex in 1984. The designation includes the church and the former school building, which is the parish's original church building and the oldest standing church building in Iowa. The designation also included the rectory, which was partially torn down in 2009. The complex was also listed on the Davenport Register of Historic Properties in 1992 as St. Anthony's Church Square. The property has been known historically as Church Square. In 2020 the parish buildings, except for the parish center, were included as contributing properties in the Davenport Downtown Commercial Historic District. Because of its recent construction date, the parish center is excluded as a contributing property.

== Development ==
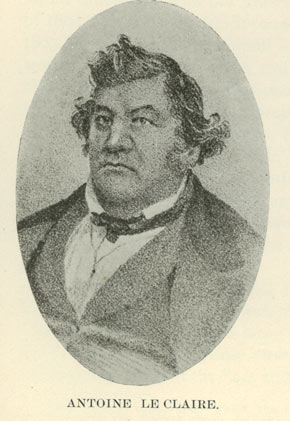
Antoine LeClaire

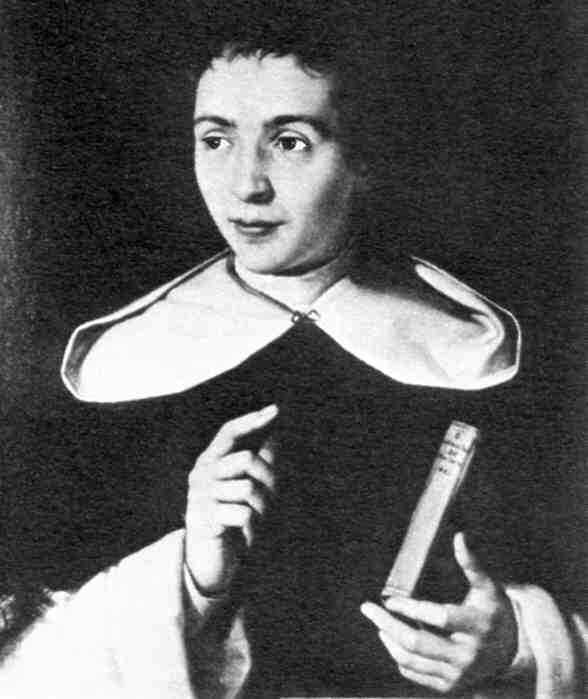
Rev. Samuel Charles Mazzuchelli, OP

In 1832, on what is now the city of Davenport, Chief Keokuk of the Sauk tribe signed a treaty with the United States government after the tribe's defeat in the Black Hawk War. The tribe ceded land on the west side of the Mississippi River, which was then opened to settlement. Antoine LeClaire, who was French-Pottawattamie and served as the translator at the treaty signing, received two parcels of land. The original section of the city was laid out in 1836. The next year an addition was made to the small town on one of LeClaire's parcels. He stipulated that a Catholic church be built on one of the squares. That same year a frontier missionary, the Rev. Samuel Charles Mazzuchelli, OP, arrived in Davenport and started the parish. At that time there were 25 Catholics in a town of 100 people. It is the oldest church congregation in Davenport.

Mazzuchelli drew up plans for a simple two-story structure that would serve as a church and priest's residence. He actually gave the parish two patron saints. St. Peter is the parish's primary patron, and St. Anthony of Padua is its secondary patron. However, the parish has always been known as St. Anthony's, the patron saint of its benefactor Antoine LeClaire. Ground was broken for the new church on April 27, 1838, and it was built by pioneer settlers Adam Noel, John Noel and Joseph Noel with assistance from Harvey Leonard for $2,000. The first bricks manufactured in the city of Davenport were used to build the church. Bishop Mathias Loras of Dubuque dedicated the new structure on May 23, 1839. The building served many purposes for the small community. It was a church, city hall, courthouse, schoolhouse, public forum, and gathering place for the citizens of the town. The church's bell called parishioners to Mass, children to school, sounded the alarm for a fire, as well as summoning the city's aldermen for their sessions.

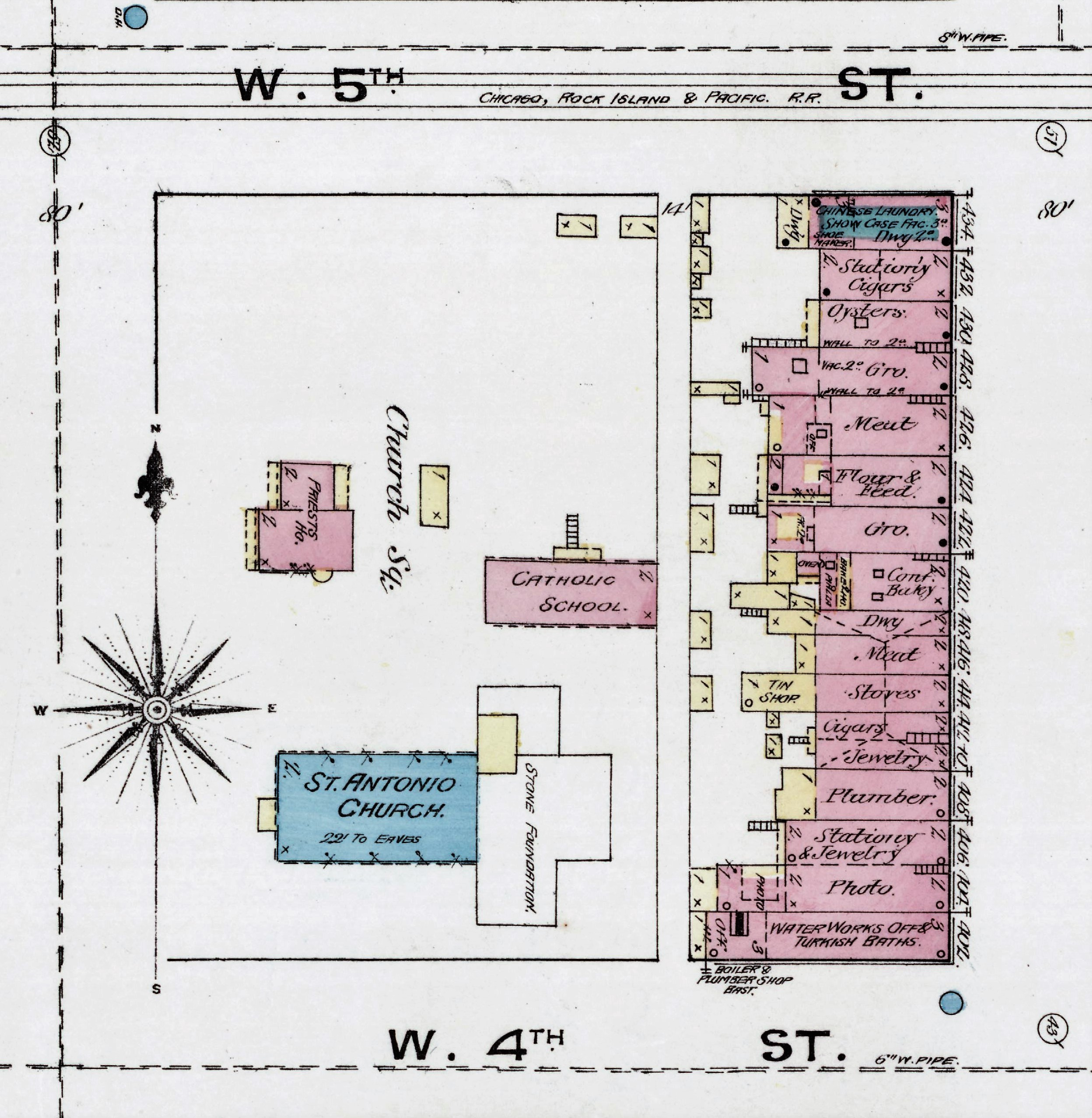
1886 Sanborn Fire Insurance Map of Church Square. Note the church addition was not completed, and the commercial buildings on the east side of the square.

The title to the property, named Church Square, was deeded to Bishop Loras in 1839 to support the Catholic Church in Davenport. Commercial properties were built on the east side of the block. Income from these properties was a factor in Davenport being named a see city with its own bishop in 1881.

The church had a small choir which included Antoine LeClaire and Judge C.G.R. Mitchell, who would provide the land for the city's first Catholic cemetery and two of the churches in the city's west end. There was, however, no organ. Instead, music was led by a small ensemble made up of a violin, clarinet, flute, and cello.

The parish's first pastor was a French missionary priest recruited by Bishop Loras, the Rev. J.A.M. Pelamourgues, who arrived in Davenport in September 1839. He served the parish until 1868 when he remained in his native France while he was visiting there. Initially, Father Pelamourgues resided in a partitioned section of the gallery of the church. He was also responsible for more than the small parish in Davenport. He traveled to other Catholic communities in the region: Muscatine, Iowa City, Burlington, Columbus Junction, DeWitt and Lyons (the north side of present-day Clinton). Bishop Loras was also interested in evangelizing the Native Americans in his jurisdiction and he placed Father Pelamourgues in charge of the Sauk and Fox tribes in southeastern Iowa.

== School ==
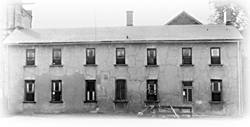
Undated photo of the original St. Anthony's Church built in 1838. Iowa's oldest church structure still in use.

St. Anthony's School opened in 1839 with Father Pelamourgues as its teacher. Initially, classes were taught in the body of the church with a curtain closing off the sanctuary. In 1844 the church building was extended 35 feet (11 m) to the east to accommodate the new classroom space. The most prominent pupil to be educated at St. Anthony's in its early years was John Forrest Dillon, who would go on to become the Chief Justice of the Iowa Supreme Court and a United States circuit court judge.

In 1844 Father Pelamourgues convinced the Sisters of Charity of the Blessed Virgin Mary to teach in the school and to start a school for girls. However, financial conditions were such that the sisters only stayed for three years. They returned in 1855 to teach at St. Anthony's. Immaculate Conception Academy was founded as a girls' school in 1859, and was located up the hill from St. Anthony's in 1864. The Sisters who taught at St. Anthony's lived at the academy. It remained in operation until it was merged with St. Ambrose Academy to form Assumption High School in 1958. It was at that time the parish purchased the Fred Finch House on Main Street for a convent to house the sisters who taught a St. Anthony's. The parish school at St. Anthony's continued until it closed in 1968 because of low enrollment. The building continues to be used for the parish's religious education program.

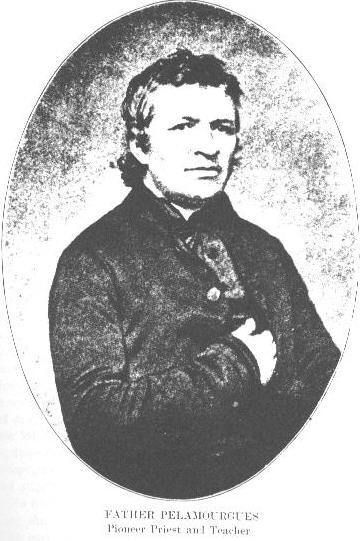
Rev. J.A.M. Pelamourgues

== Growth ==
The parish continued to grow. By 1847 there were 450 parishioners, which was still a quarter of the town's population. In 1850 the front section of the present church was begun. Thomas Doyle and Henry Belken were responsible for constructing the new church. The building, completed in 1853 in the simple Greek Revival style, was built of locally quarried stone and measured 94 by 44 feet (29 by 13 m). The original building was remodeled for more classroom space at this time. The rectory was built around 1877.

New parishes were beginning to form in Davenport that took parishioners from St. Anthony's. St. Kunigunda (1855), which was renamed St. Joseph in 1881, served the pastoral needs of the growing German Community. St. Margaret's (1856) was built on top of the bluff to the east of downtown. St. Margaret's became Davenport's first cathedral in 1881 with the establishment of the Davenport Diocese. St. Anthony's was not chosen to be the cathedral because its downtown location was considered inappropriate. St. Margaret's was renamed Sacred Heart when the present cathedral was built in 1891. St. Mary's Church was started in 1867 to serve the English speaking Catholics of the west end.

Even though these new parishes were being formed, St. Anthony's continued to grow. Father Pelamourgues was succeeded by several priests who stayed for short periods of time until the Rev. D.J. Flannery arrived in 1882 and remained pastor until 1916. It was during his pastorate that transept wings with balconies were added to the church from 1885 to 1886 and the sanctuary was extended 18 feet (5.5 m). A larger sacristy was also added to the church. The addition was designed by Davenport architect Victor Huot and built of brick.

== 20th Century ==
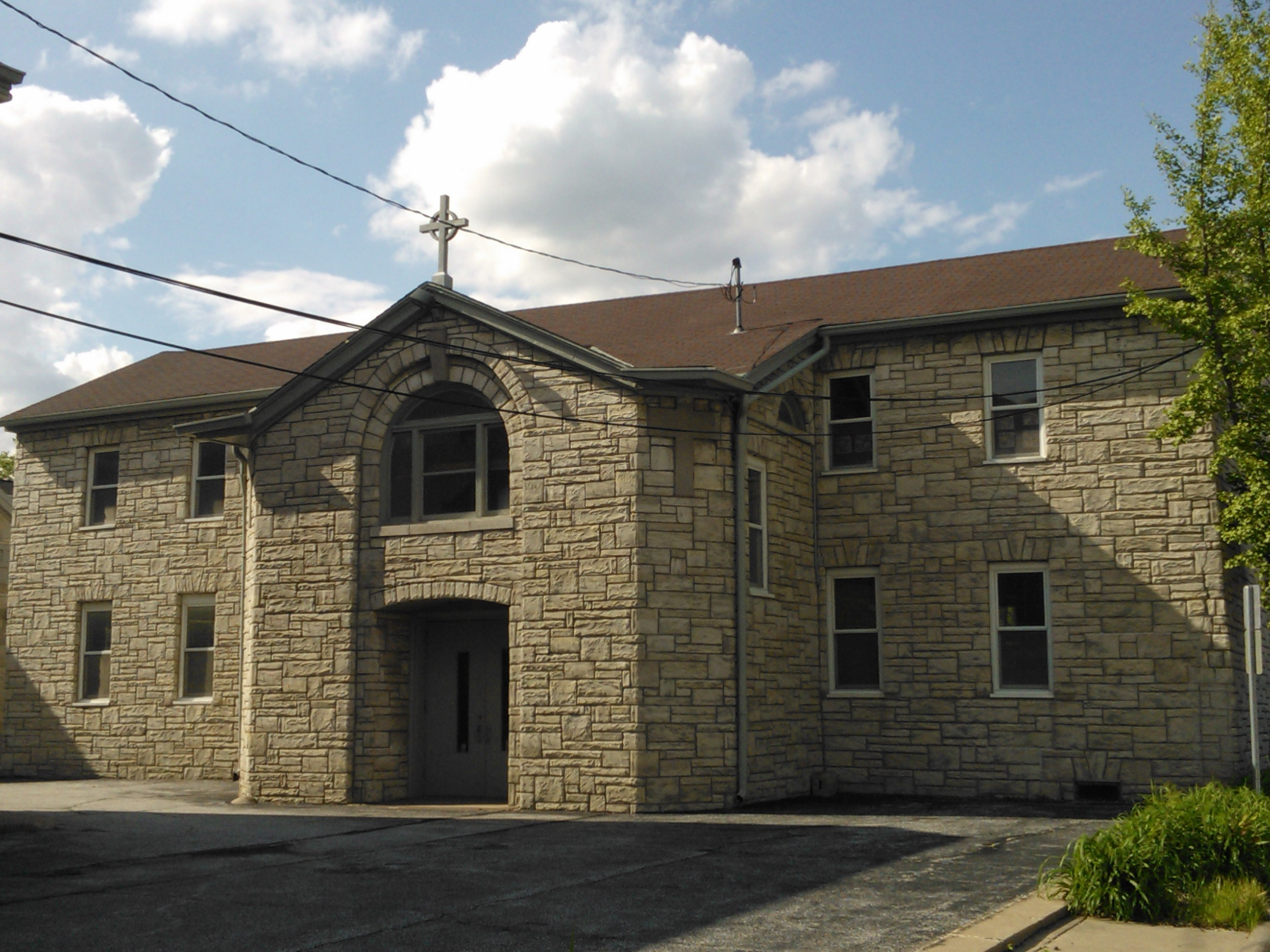
The original church

By the turn of the 20th century St. Anthony's became the only church downtown. By the end of the first decade the parish's boundaries had become fixed to the central city with the founding of two parishes on top of the hill: Holy Family (1898) in the northwest part of the city and St. Paul the Apostle (1909) on the east side.

The grotto to the Blessed Virgin Mary on the north side of the church was added in the 1920s. It was rebuilt in 1998 and the current statue was placed in it in 1999.

A major renovation was carried out in 1945 and 1948 when a manufactured stone facing, or permastone, was put on the 1886 addition to the church, the school (original church), and the rectory. This gave the parish complex a unified appearance. The sacristy was also expanded along the south transept. The north wing was also added to the school building. This was the last addition made to the original building. There was also an addition made to the rectory to create more living space for the resident clergy.

In the 1960s changes were made to facilitate the liturgical reforms of the Second Vatican Council. While the communion rail was removed and a new free-standing altar was created so the priest could face the congregation, the old altars, frescos and statuary remain in the church.

One of the more colorful chapters in the parish's history was the Folk Masses of the 1970s. Rev. James Grubb, the associate pastor, inspired the masses that included contemporary music played on guitars, colorful vestments, and young people sitting on the floor of the sanctuary.

In 1987 the parish celebrated its sesquicentennial. To commemorate the occasion, a sculpture was commissioned and placed on the front of the church property facing Main Street. It depicts Father Mazzuchelli, a Sister of Charity of the Blessed Virgin Mary, a child representing the children who attended the parish school, Col. George Davenport (for whom the city of Davenport was named) and Antoine LeClaire. The statue group stands atop a pedestal that encloses the church's original bell.

== 21st Century ==
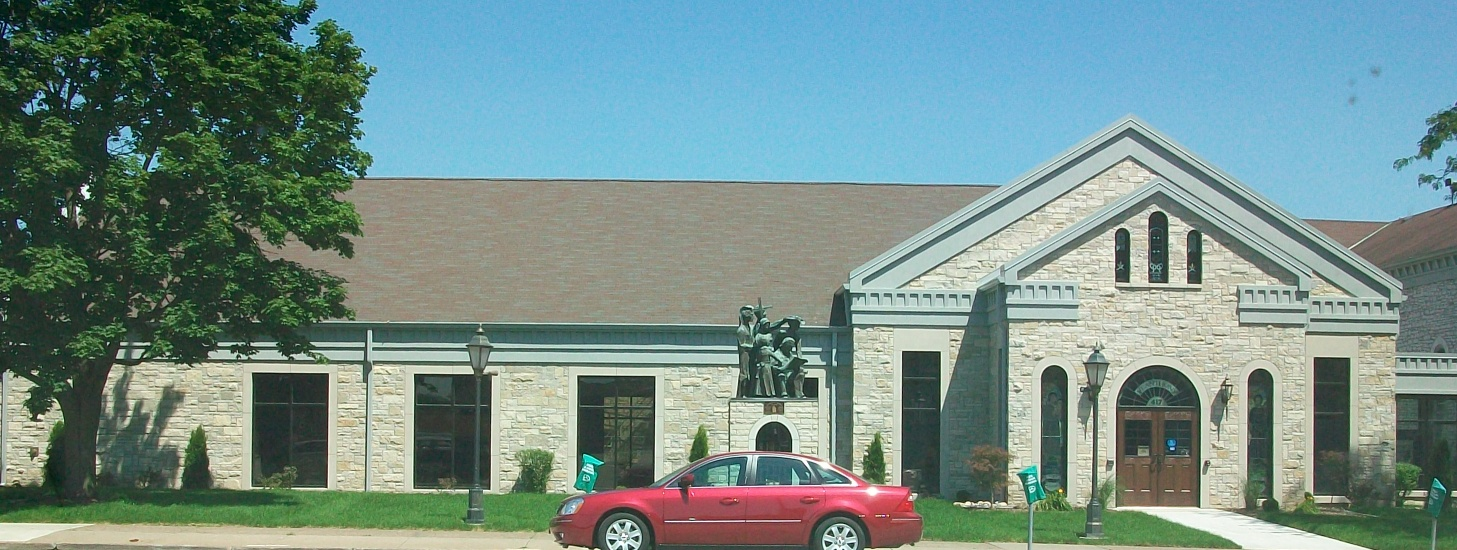
The Gathering Center, which was built on the site of the former rectory in 2010.

In 2009, most of the rectory was torn down to make room for a new parish center. Called the Gathering Center, the new facility is a 7,200-square-foot (670 m^{2}) building that includes classrooms with moveable walls for religious education classes, church offices, a kitchen and a renovated “McAnthony’s Window,” a parish-based outreach program. A social hall that holds up to 300 people is also a part of the new facility. The new building and its landscaping are meant to blend into the historic Church Square property. The original church building was also renovated.

In 2017 a new pipe organ was built by the Noack Organ Company of Georgetown, Massachusetts and installed in the church. It is the fourth organ the parish has owned since the church was built. The previous instrument dated from the 1940s.

== Social Action ==
The parish has been involved in the social and civic life of the Davenport community almost from its very beginning. The Davenport Temperance Society, which was formed in 1842, held their weekly meetings at St. Anthony's. The church was the scene of public lectures including an 1857 series delivered to the Catholic Literary Institute. St. Mary’s Council of the Knights of Father Matthew, a fraternal beneficiary organization, met in the school hall in the early 1900s. During the same time period, the local Knights of Columbus council, the second to organize in the state, held special Masses at St. Anthony's. Both church leaders and parishioners protested city policies that taxed prostitution, gambling, and 24-hour saloons in the city. While these taxes benefited city coffers it was ultimately to the community's detriment. Civic justice issues, especially racial injustice, became prominent after World War II. St. Ambrose College professors embraced Catholic social action in the 1940s, establishing what is thought to be the first NAACP chapter on a Catholic college campus. They also established a League for Social Justice, which became the Catholic Interracial Council in 1957. This led to St. Anthony's being the starting point for the "March on Davenport." Held in August 1963, about 2,000 participants marched to LeClaire Park to support the Iowa Fair Housing Act. In 1985 the parish began its "Care and Share" program under the direction of its pastor, the Rev. Kenneth Martin. Ten percent of the parish's weekly collection was set aside to aid those in need. His successor, the Rev. James Conroy began what has been dubbed “McAnthony's Window,” a program that serves lunch to the homeless and indigent people. Another food distribution program collects food for baskets that are distributed to the elderly and poor at Thanksgiving, Christmas, and Easter.

== Architecture ==
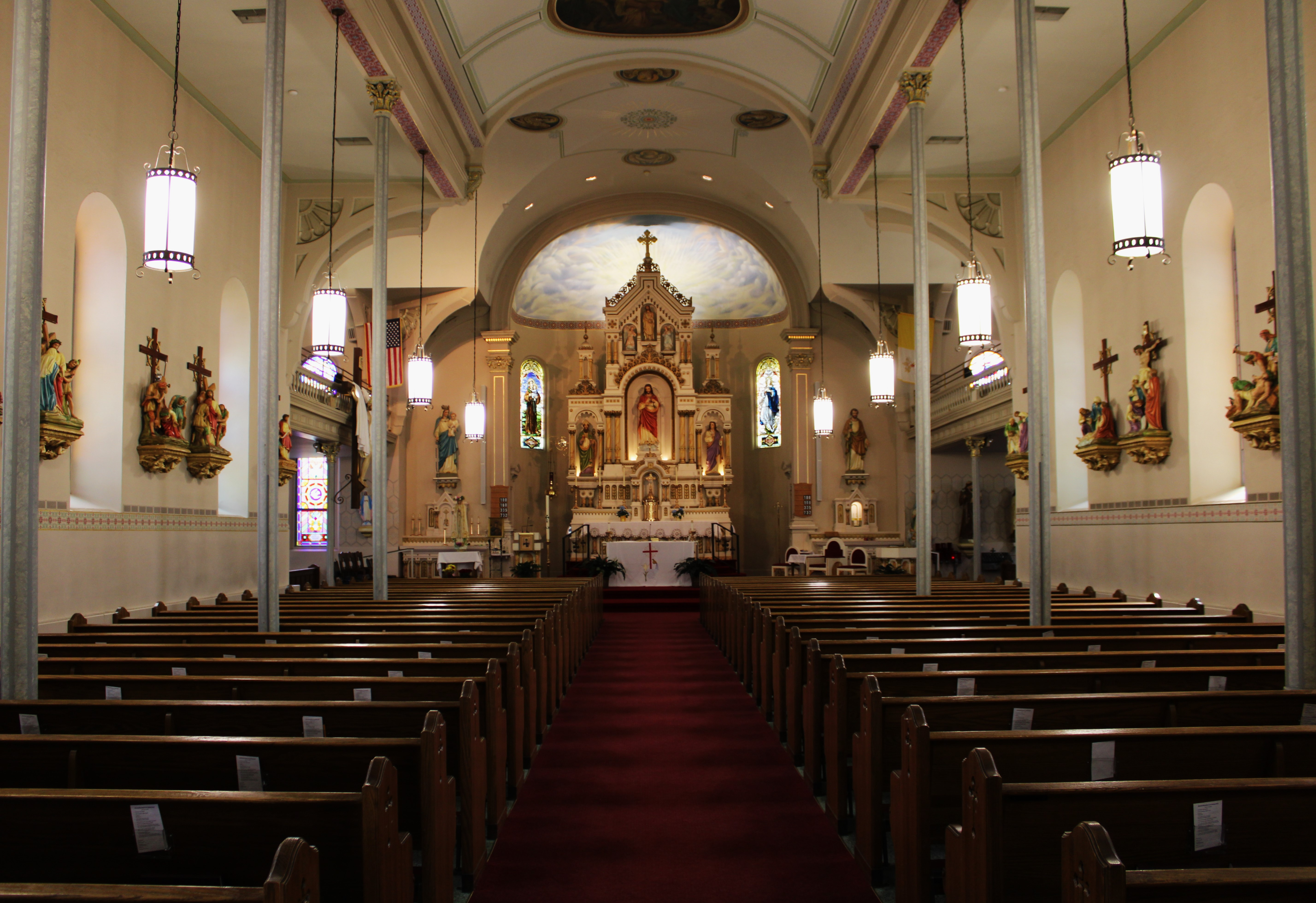
Church interior

St. Anthony's Church follows a Latin Cross plan. The exterior of the front part of the church, which is the oldest section, is composed of quarry-faced, coursed, ashlar limestone. It reflects a period when highly skilled stonemasons and finely worked materials were not readily available in Davenport. The structure features a gable front, deep eave returns and a modillion frieze. Crosses are located at the peaks of the three gable ends. The rear of the church has a hip roof. The interior plan features a larger central nave that is flanked by side aisles. The apse, which appears rounded on the interior, is squared on the exterior. As mentioned earlier, the back addition to the church is covered in permastone. The round arch is used throughout the church. It is found in the stained glass windows, the vault of the ceiling, and on the reredos in the apse. It is also found on the main entrance into the church, which is capped with a fan-shaped tympanum. The stained glass is original to each section of the building when it was built. The ceiling features paintings over the center aisle. From the front entrance to the altar they depict Jesus raising Lazarus from the dead (or possibly raising the daughter of Naim), the Assumption of Mary into Heaven, and Jesus healing the sick. In the middle of the transept over the altar are symbols that represent the Four Evangelists. The statues in the reredos include the Sacred Heart in the center and it is flanked by Saint Patrick and Saint John the Evangelist. A bas-relief of the Last Supper is on the former altar frontal. There are also numerous other statues throughout the church. The church is set back from the street and is located in a park-like setting with mature vegetation.

The former school building, which is also the original church, is a two-story, side gable building with a projecting entrance pavilion. It was originally a frame structure with a brick veneer exterior that has since been covered with permastone. Initially, it was rectangular in shape, but additions have created a cross-shaped plan. A round arch in the entrance gable end is its prominent decorative feature. There is also a cross above the entrance pavilion.

The rectory, most of which is no longer extant, was also a frame structure with brick veneer that was covered with permastone. Designed in a vernacular style, it was a two-story, three bay front-gable house with a two-story side wing and further additions. A portion of one of those additions that included the garages remains behind the Gathering Center.

== See also ==
- List of the oldest churches in the United States
