= J. A. M. Pelamourgues =

French missionary and priest

Jean-Antoine-Marie Pelamourgues
- Bishop-Elect of Saint Paul
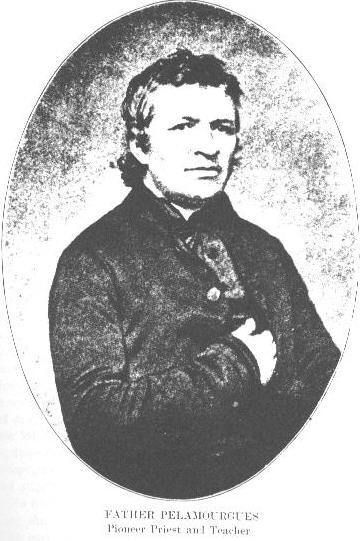
- Church: Catholic Church
- Diocese: Diocese of Saint Paul
- In office: 23 February 1858 – May 1858
- Predecessor: Augustin Ravoux
- Successor: Thomas Grace

Orders
- Ordination: 1832

Personal details
- Born: 9 February 1811 Graissac, Aveyron, French Empire
- Died: 19 November 1875 (aged 64) Sainte-Geneviève-sur-Argence, Aveyron, France

Jean-Antoine-Marie Pelamourgues (1811–1875) was a French missionary who was one of the first Roman Catholic priests to serve in the Diocese of Dubuque in the state of Iowa. He served as the first pastor of St. Anthony's Church in Davenport, Iowa from 1839 to 1868.

== Early life and ministry ==
Pelamourgues was born in the city of Graissac, in the Department of Aveyron, France. He was ordained a priest for the Diocese of Rodez.

After Bishop Mathias Loras was consecrated as the first bishop of Dubuque in Mobile, Alabama in 1837 he set sail for Europe to recruit priests for his new diocese. While in France he recruited two priests, Joseph Crétin and Pelamourgues, as well as four seminarians: Augustin Ravoux, Lucien Galtier, James Causse, and Remigius Petiot. They made a difficult voyage of 54 days across the Atlantic Ocean in the Autumn of 1838. They attributed their safe passage to the intercession of St. Cessianus, whose relics had been given to Loras by Pope Gregory XVI while he was in Rome. The priests had celebrated Mass at an altar constructed over the relics. The saint's relics are now under the altar in St. Raphael's Cathedral in Dubuque.

After they landed in New York, Pelamourgues and the seminarians went to St. Mary's Seminary at Baltimore to learn English, while Loras and Crétin proceeded to St. Louis to wait out the winter. In the spring the Rev. Samuel Charles Mazzuchelli, OP, the only priest serving the Dubuque Diocese, traveled to St. Louis and escorted Loras and the others to Dubuque.

== Pastor in Davenport ==
Bishop Loras went to Davenport, Iowa to make a pastoral visit and to dedicate St. Anthony's Church on May 23, 1839. While he was there the parishioners pleaded with the bishop for a parish priest. In July of the same year the bishop made a pastoral visit to the area around Fort Snelling in present-day St. Paul, Minnesota. Father Pelamourgues accompanied him on the journey. On the way back to Dubuque they visited the villages of the Sioux tribes along the way. Pelamourgues stayed in Prairie du Chien, Wisconsin for a month before he was recalled.

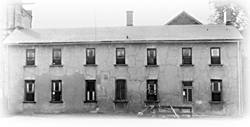
Undated photo of the original St. Anthony's Church built in 1838.

In September 1839 Father Pelamourgues was assigned the first pastor of St. Anthony's Church in Davenport. Until 1846 he also regularly visited Muscatine, Burlington, Iowa City, Columbus Junction, DeWitt and Lyons, which is the north side of present-day Clinton. He also took pastoral responsibility for the people in Stephenson, Illinois, which was across the Mississippi River from Davenport. The town is now the city of Rock Island.

Bishop Loras desired the conversion of the Native American peoples of his diocese to Christianity. He gave various priests the pastoral responsibility for a particular tribe. Father Pelamourgues was given the care of the Sac (or Sauk) and Fox tribes. Father Pelamourgues was not successful in this part of his mission. However, there is one story that illustrates that his failure was not from want of trying. When he was visiting Burlington, he was told of a Native American in Agency City. He immediately set out to attend the dying man but was stopped by a guard who informed him that if he entered the tribe's reservation he would be imprisoned. Father Pelamourgues determined that his responsibility was to the dying man and so he continued on. He was taken prisoner for two or three days until General Joseph M. Street returned.

Davenport had a small French community and a larger, and growing, Irish community. Pelamourgues was aware that his ability to speak English was minimal at best, and so he studied so as to be able to both read and speak English fluently. When German immigrants started moving to Davenport he started to learn that language as well. He also taught English to other new priests to the diocese.

When Pelamourgues first arrived at St. Anthony's, the church building was used for various community functions as it was the largest structure in the small town. He resided in the gallery of the church, which was separated from the rest of the space by rough boards. Eventually a residence was created for him on the main floor of the building.

As soon as Father Pelamourgues arrived in Davenport he started a school at St. Anthony's, and he served as its first teacher. It was one of the first schools established in the small town. Classes were taught in the church proper itself with a curtain pulled across the altar area. He had an addition built onto the building in 1843, and he convinced the Sisters of Charity of the Blessed Virgin Mary to open a school in Davenport. Financial difficulties forced the sisters to leave after a year. They returned in 1855 to teach the girls at St. Anthony's. Immaculate Conception Academy opened four years later. Pelamourgues also desired brothers to teach the boys, but declined Bishop Loras' offer to send French Brothers. He said a French pastor was all an Irish community could handle. He continued to teach the boys. He was known as a strict disciplinarian, and believed it was important to teach his students a trade. His most prominent pupil was John Forrest Dillon who would go to become the chief justice of the Iowa Supreme Court, and a United States District Court judge appointed by President Ulysses S. Grant.

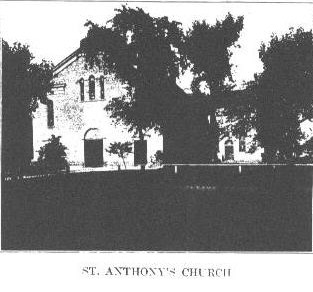
The stone church built by Fr. Pelamourgues in the 1850s. On the right through the trees can be seen the addition added in 1883.

In 1850 Pope Pius IX established the Diocese of St. Paul, and Father Crétin was appointed as its first bishop. Pelamourgues was assigned by Bishop Loras to replace Crétin as vicar general of the Diocese of Dubuque. After Bishop Crétin's death seven years later, Father Pelamourgues was chosen to succeed him in St. Paul. Pelamourgues was dismayed by the appointment and when he received his letter of appointment he responded to the Holy See with a letter declining the office. His reasons were accepted and Pelamourgues remained in Davenport. In 1865 when Loras' successor, Bishop Clement Smyth, died, Pelamourgues served as administrator of the Dubuque Diocese. He was on the list of names that was sent to the Holy See to replace Smyth. Father Pelamourgues was also an early promoter of Davenport being named a see city when the question arose concerning the division of the Dubuque Diocese.

In 1850 plans were being drawn up to construct a new church at St. Anthony's. It was a simple structure built of stone in the Greek Revival style. The building was 84 by 44 feet and completed in 1853. St. Anthony's was never a wealthy community in the years that Pelamourgues was pastor, and so it took time to carry out the building project. Pelamourgues himself left Davenport and traveled to his native France in 1852 to visit his ailing father.

As Davenport continued to grow so did St. Anthony's, and there were needs that Father Pelamourgues could not accomplish on his own. German immigrants began to settle in Davenport, and so he helped to establish St. Kunigunda parish to serve their pastoral needs in 1855. The following year he and Antoine LeClaire were instrumental in establishing St. Margaret's on the bluff to the east of downtown, and St. Anthony's lost its long-time parishioner and benefactor. While he helped establish St. Kunigunda he was opposed to a church that was only for German-speaking people. When the German pastor, Rev. Michael Flammang, refused to serve the needs of the Irish who settled in the west end, Pelamourgues threatened to build a new church under his nose. In 1867 Pelamourgues established St. Mary's parish on the Catholic cemetery property in the west end, two blocks from St. Kunigunda. He served both St. Anthony's and St. Mary's as pastor until a resident pastor was assigned to St. Mary's in 1868.

== Later life ==
In 1868 Pelamourgues visited his native France, but circumstances arose that prevented his return to Davenport. He was involved in establishing one more institution in the city, however. In 1869 Mother Mary Borromeo Johnson of the Sisters of Mercy came to Davenport raising money for a new school in DeWitt. She saw the conditions at the county poorhouse, and was asked to take over care of the sick and poor. Through his attorney, Father Pelamourgues assisted Mother Borromeo in acquiring the property where the Sisters of Charity of the Blessed Virgin Mary had initially established a girls' school at the end of Marquette Street for Mercy Hospital. Pelamourgues lived out his remaining days in Sainte-Geneviève-sur-Argence and died there in 1875.
