= Isabel Bloom =

American sculptor

Isabel Bloom (February 20, 1908 – May 1, 2001) was an Iowa artist best known for her concrete sculptures of animals and children.

A sculpture of a duck made by Isabel Bloom

== Early life ==
Isabel Rose Scherer was born in Galveston, Texas to Charles F. and Adeline (Paradise) Scherer in 1908. The family moved to Davenport, Iowa when she was an infant. She showed artistic promise from a young age and studied at many different institutions including, the Immaculate Conception Academy, the Vogue School of Fashion and Design, and the Chicago Art Institute. She learned sculpture while studying at Grant Wood's Stone City Art Colony in central Iowa under Florence Sprague. This is where she met her future husband, John Bloom. The two married in 1938.

== Career ==
Isabel became involved in the local art community, teaching ceramics and exhibiting locally and regionally. Her artwork was displayed at the Davenport Municipal Art Gallery and she frequently won awards at the annual Quad City Art Show. She taught for the Davenport Park Board and the Rock Island Adult Education program and led story time programs at the Davenport Public Library.

From 1953 to 1957 Isabel hosted a children's art television program called Let's Make Art on WOC-TV in Davenport. Each show featured a children's story or fairy tale and art lesson and featured original sets she painted and characters she made from clay.

In the 1940s and 1950s, Isabel began experimenting with sculpting with wet cement. She founded her sculpture business, Isabel Bloom, in Davenport, Iowa in the 1950s.

== Legacy ==
In 2014 the Isabel Bloom Art Education Endowment was established to support art education in Scott County and Rock Island County schools by the company she founded.
