= Immaculate Conception Academy (Davenport, Iowa) =

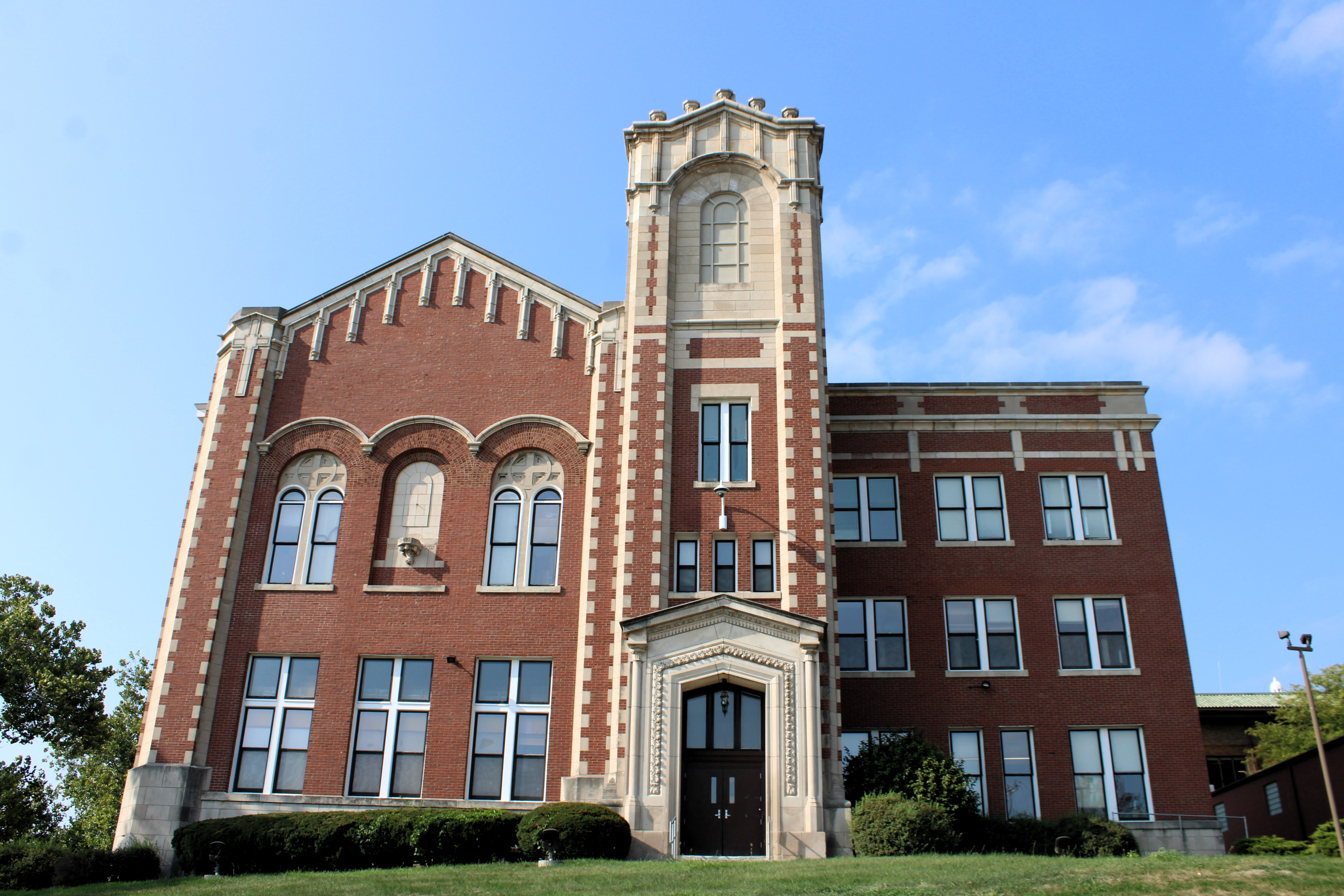
- Eighth Street facade in 2023

- Location within Iowa
- 41°31′42″N 90°34′30″W
- Location: Eighth and Main Streets; Davenport, Iowa

History
- Built: 1884, 1906, 1909

Site notes
- Architect: Victor Huot
- Architectural style: Second Empire
- Governing body: Private

Immaculate Conception Academy, known locally as ICA, was a Catholic girls' high school located in Davenport, Iowa, United States. It was begun by the Sisters of Charity of the Blessed Virgin Mary (BVM) in 1859 and it remained in operation until it merged with St. Ambrose Academy in 1958 to form Assumption High School. The academy building remains in use as an academic building on the campus of Palmer College of Chiropractic.

== History ==
=== Foundation ===
In 1844 the Rev. J.A.M. Pelamourges, pastor of St. Anthony's Church in Davenport petitioned Bishop Mathias Loras of Dubuque for Sisters to teach in the parish school and to open a girls' school in the town. Five BVM Sisters arrived the same year and established St. Philomena's Academy in a three-story brick house that was still under construction. Unfortunately, most of the parishioners at St. Anthony's, then Davenport's only parish, were mostly poor Irish immigrants. At the same time membership in the congregation had dropped by half as many settlers stopped in Davenport for only a short time as they headed west to their permanent home. Because of low attendance and little money, the Sisters were forced to close the school in 1847.

Father Pelamourges continued to petition the bishop to send Sisters and Brothers to Davenport to open schools. After Pelamourges returned to France to visit his ailing father in 1852, Antoine LeClaire, who was the principle founder of the city of Davenport, and Judge G.C.R. Mitchell petitioned Bishop Loras to send religious to Davenport to staff a school for Catholic children. In 1855 the BVM Sisters returned to Davenport to staff St. Anthony's School. Judge Mitchell and his wife offered the Sisters ten acres of land northwest of Davenport to operate an academy for girls. The following year the offer was accepted and Sister Mary Agnes Hurley, BVM, was given the responsibility for building the new school. A two-story brick building with a one-story chapel wing was built and the Academy of the Immaculate Conception was opened in 1859. The location proved to be its downfall. There were no roads that led to the academy and the Financial Panic of 1857 created financial difficulties. In the first two years only seven students were enrolled in the school.

=== Growth ===
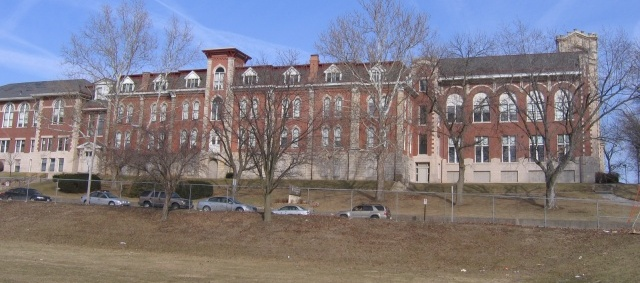
Main Street side of the building

The Panic of 1857 provided an opportunity, however, as it created bankruptcies in town and property became available. Father Pelamourges was able to purchase the academy site and the Rev. Terrance Donaghoe, who was the director of the BVM Sisters, was able to purchase the home of banker George Sargent on Brady Street in 1861. After five years it too became too small and Father Donaghoe bought the home of Richard Hill at Eighth and Main Streets. The property would be the academy's home for the rest of its existence. The former property outside of town would in time become the site for Mercy Hospital.

The BVM Sister's Davenport community numbered 14 Sisters and Sister Mary Margaret Mann, BVM, one of the original members of the BVM community, was its Superior. The Sisters, who lived at the academy, taught at ICA, St. Anthony's and St. Marguerite's schools. Eventually St. Marguerite's and St. Anthony's provided their own convents.

A frame building was added to the Richard Hill residence to house music studios and an auditorium. By the early 1880s, a larger building was needed. Davenport architect Victor Huot was chosen to design the new building, which was situated to the north of the former Hill residence. Previously he had designed St. Joseph's and St. Mary's churches in Davenport. He also designed Ambrose Hall the first building that housed St. Ambrose University. Both Ambrose Hall and the ICA building were designed in the Second Empire style, and they were designed so they could be built in stages over a period of time. The first section of the ICA building was opened in 1884. The first addition was added to the building in 1906 and replaced the frame building. A second addition, which fronts Eighth Street, was added three years later.

=== Merger ===
At first, ICA included primary and secondary education, and it included both boarding and day students. Eventually the primary grades were dropped in favor of the secondary grades. In 1940 there were 256 girls enrolled in the school. In 1955 it was determined that Davenport should have a central Catholic high school and that Immaculate Conception and St. Ambrose academies would merge. When it closed ICA enrolled over 400 students. In the 99 years of its existence over 4,000 girls graduated from the school. The academy building was acquired by Palmer College of Chiropractic whose campus is adjacent to the ICA property.

The BVM Sisters continued their tradition of teaching at Assumption. The new high school was co-institutional and the Sisters were responsible for the Girls' Division. Sister Ann Esther, BVM, was the principal of the Division until 1962 when she became an assistant principal. Assumption became co-educational in 1969 and the tradition of educating boys and girls separately ended.

== Notable Alumnae ==
- Isabel Bloom, artist
