= Fred Finch House =

Historic house in Iowa, United States

- U.S. National Register of Historic Places
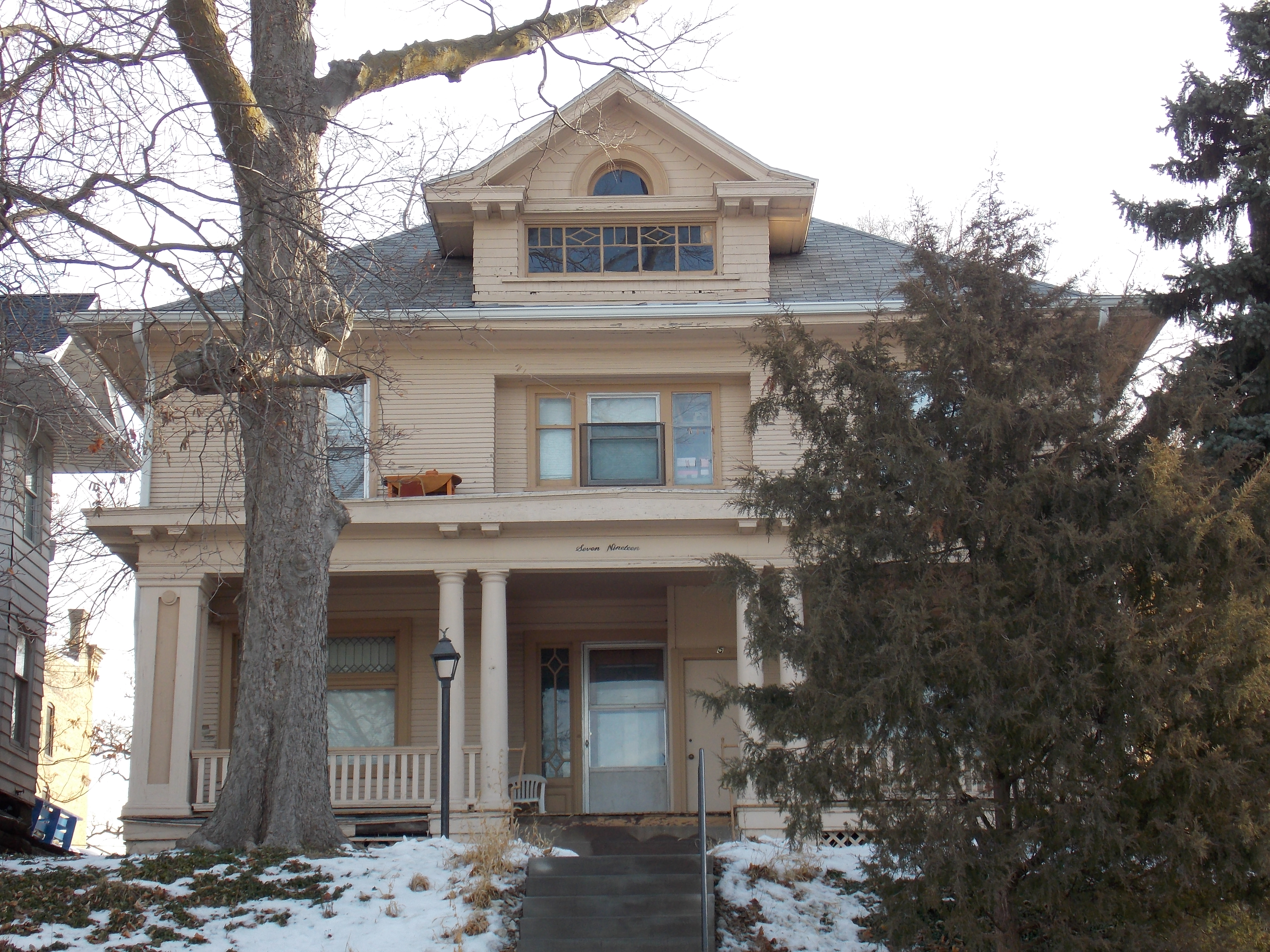

- Location within Iowa Location within the United States
- Location: 719 Main St. Davenport, Iowa
- Coordinates: 41°31′39″N 90°34′31″W
- Built: 1905
- Architect: Dietrich J. Harfst
- Architectural style: Georgian Revival
- MPS: Davenport MRA
- NRHP reference No.: 83002428
- Added to NRHP: July 7, 1983

The Fred Finch House is a historic building located on the hill above downtown Davenport, Iowa, United States. It has been listed on the National Register of Historic Places since 1983.

== History ==
Fred Finch was the Davenport and Scott County Assessor at the time this house was built from 1904 to 1905. Previously he had been with the Farmers and Merchants Savings Bank. Finch and his wife Anna lived on the northern side of this double house and her parents lived on the southern side. The family continued to own and live in the house until 1957 when it was sold to St. Anthony's Catholic Church downtown for use as a convent.

== Architecture ==
Davenport architect Dietrich J. Harfst designed this two-story house in the Georgian Revival style. It sits high above Main Street as it climbs the bluff above the downtown area. It is also one of the few of Harfst's projects to remain in Davenport, which is primarily why it is significant. Otherwise, it is a fairly typical hipped box style house. It features a front porch with paired columns and corner piers. At one time a balustrade lined the roof of the porch.
