= St. Mary's Academy (Davenport, Iowa) =

- U.S. National Register of Historic Places
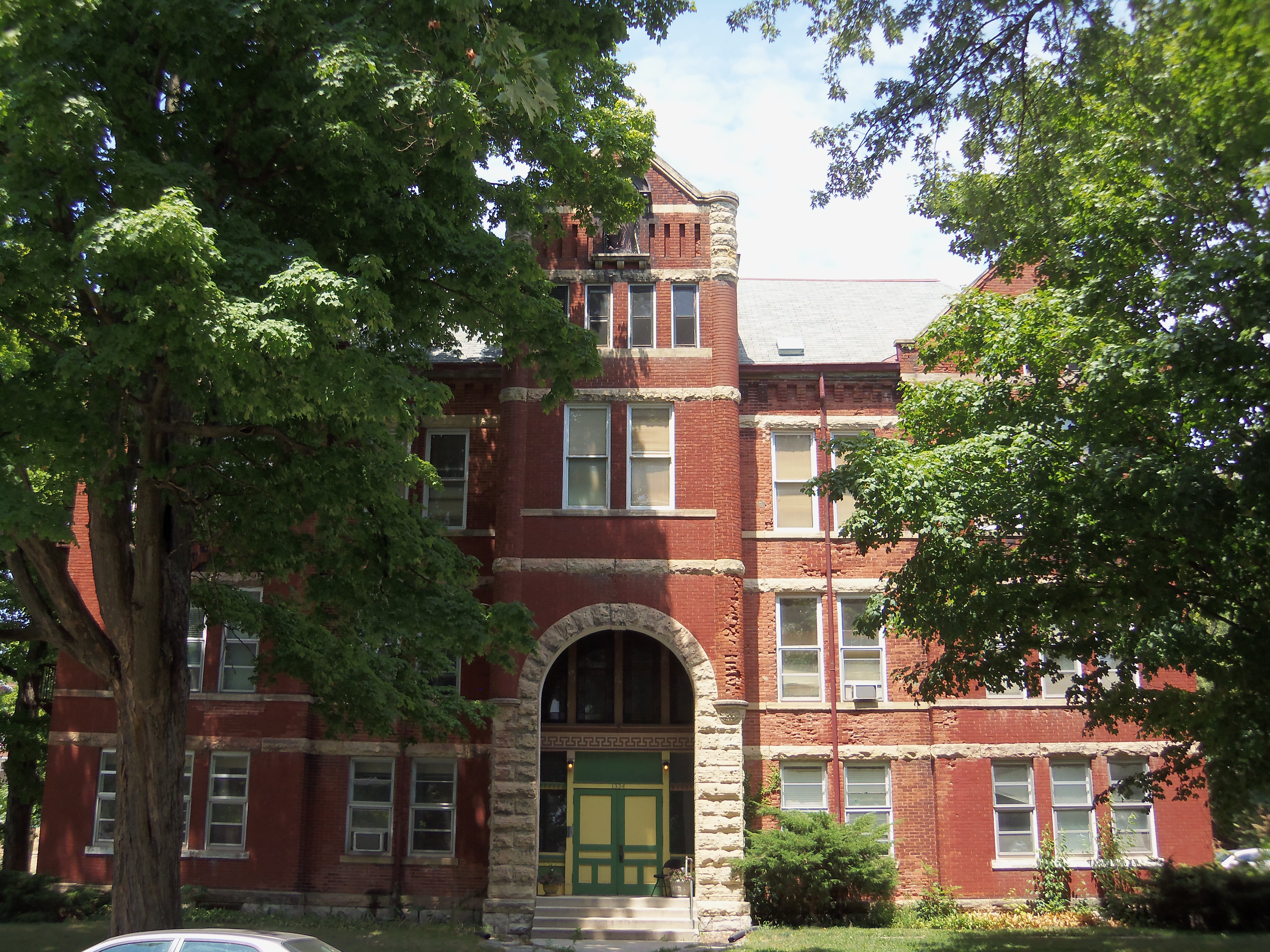

- Location within Iowa Location within the United States
- Location: 1334 W. 8th St. Davenport, Iowa
- Coordinates: 41°31′40″N 90°35′38″W
- Area: 2 acres (0.81 ha)
- Built: 1888; 138 years ago
- Architectural style: Romanesque
- MPS: Davenport MRA
- NRHP reference No.: 84001556
- Added to NRHP: July 27, 1984

St. Mary's Academy is a historic building located in a residential area of the West End of Davenport, Iowa, United States. It was listed on the National Register of Historic Places in 1984. The building was built as a school building for St. Mary's Catholic Church, which is listed separately on the National Register.

== History ==
The structure was built in the 19th century during the pastorate of the Rev. Michael Flavin who served the parish from 1871 to 1884. After the parish built a new school and convent across the street from the church during the pastorate of Msgr. J.P. Ryan the building became a home for aged women and young, single woman who worked in the city. The facility was operated by the Sisters of Mercy. It was at this time that the rear chapel addition was built. The name of the building was referred to then as St. Mary's Home. The structure was later converted into apartments.

== Architecture ==
The building is constructed of red brick in the Romanesque Revival style. Bands of rough cut stone are placed above the windows and the same stonework frames the main entrance. The 3½ story building features a rectangular plan, a hipped roof, advanced corner and end pavilions with parapet gables, and a symmetrical front. Decorative brickwork may be found across the top of the building, just below the roofline. he main entrance is constructed of cast iron and features art glass and Greek fret decorative elements. A statue of the Blessed Virgin Mary remains in the niche at the top of the entrance tower.
