= St. Mary's Catholic Church (Davenport, Iowa) =

Coordinates: 41°31′30.3″N 90°35′41.1″W

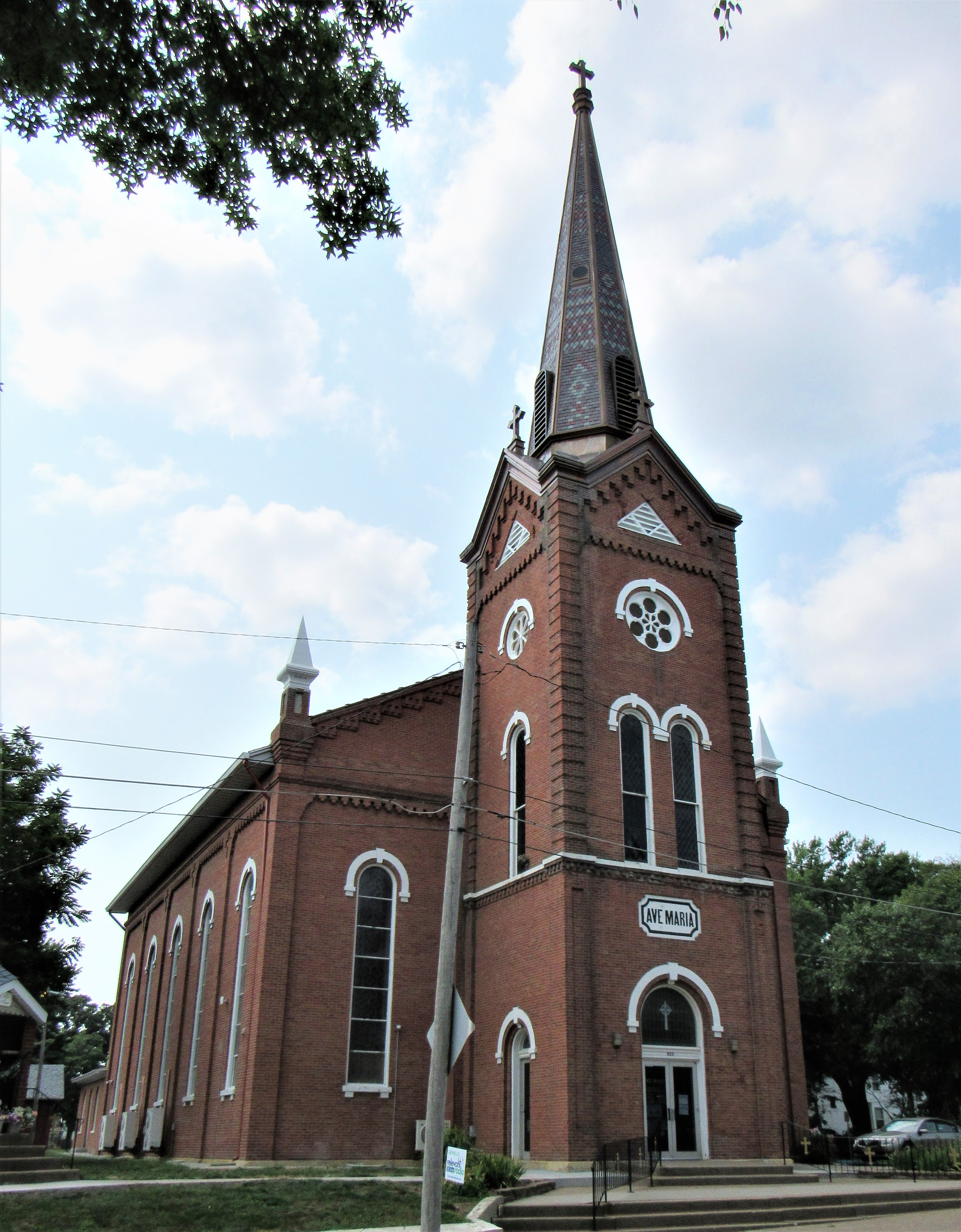
- St. Mary's Catholic Church from Fillmore St

- Location within Iowa
- Location: 516 Fillmore St. Davenport, Iowa
- Country: USA
- Denomination: Catholic Church

History
- Founded: July 21, 1867
- Founder: Rev. J.A.M. Pelamourges
- Dedication: Mary, mother of Jesus

Architecture
- Functional status: Active
- Groundbreaking: 1867
- Completed: 1867
- Construction cost: $25,000

Specifications
- Materials: Brick

Administration
- Diocese: Davenport
- St. Mary's Roman Catholic; Church Complex
- U.S. National Register of Historic Places
- Area: 2.5 acres (1.0 ha)
- Built: 1867-1868 (church); 1877 (rectory); 1901 (convent & school)
- Architect: Victor Huot (church); Clausen & Burrows (school & convent)
- Architectural style: Romanesque Revival; Colonial Revival
- MPS: Davenport MRA
- NRHP reference No.: 84001558
- Added to NRHP: April 5, 1984

St. Mary's Catholic Church was a parish of the Diocese of Davenport. The church building is located in the west end of Davenport, Iowa, United States, at the corner of Fillmore and W. 6th Streets. It is listed on the National Register of Historic Places as St. Mary's Roman Catholic Church Complex. The designation includes the church building and rectory on the west side of Fillmore Street, and the former parochial school building and convent on the east side. A former school building operated by the parish two blocks north on West Eighth Street is also on the National Register and is listed as St. Mary's Academy. The parish ceased operations in July 2020 when it was merged into St. Anthony's Church downtown. The parish campus is being acquired by the nonprofit organization Humility Homes & Services, which is operated by the Congregation of the Humility of Mary.

== History ==
=== St. Mary's Parish ===
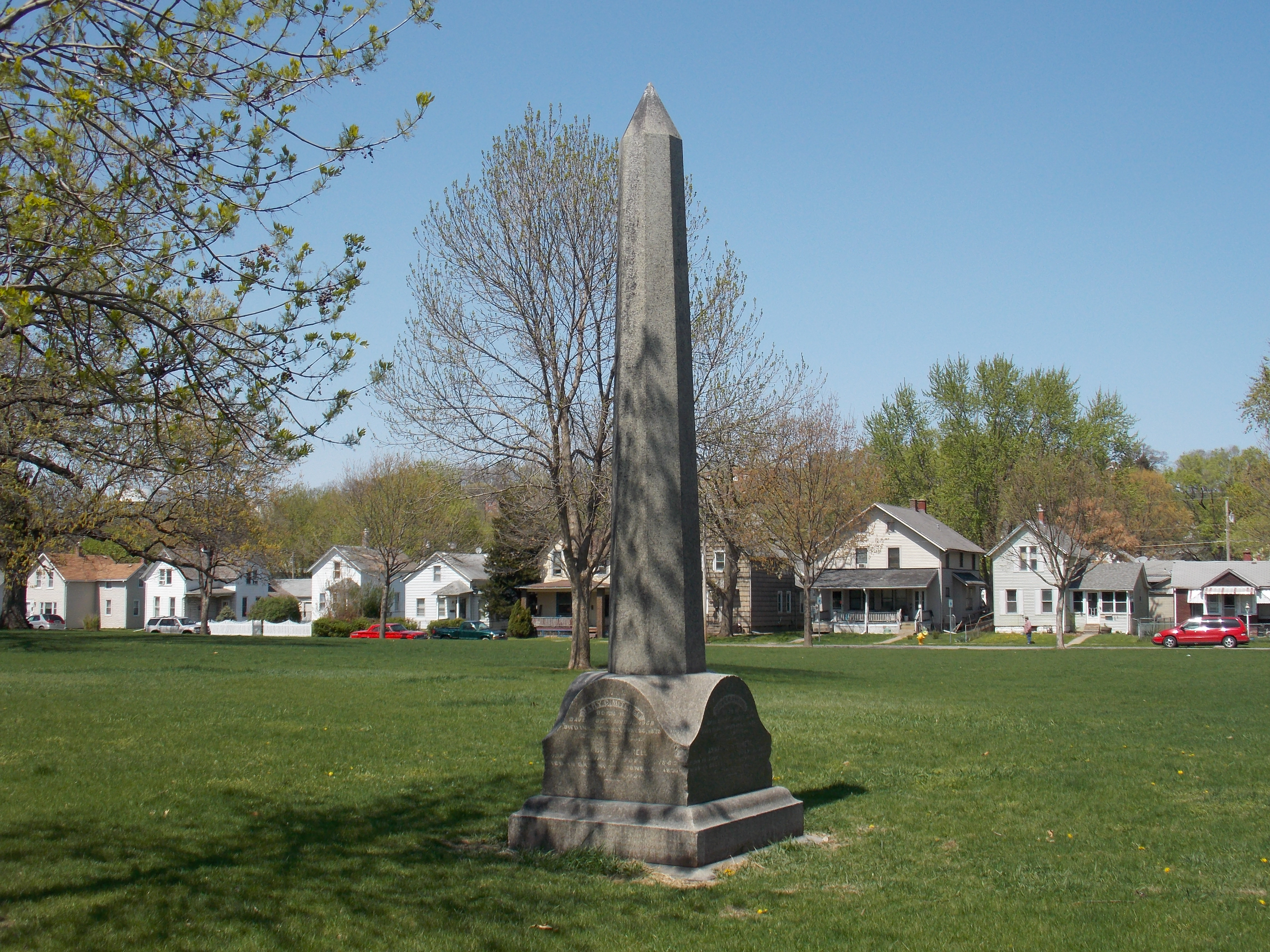
The grave of Judge G.C.R. Mitchell and family is one of the few graves left in St. Mary Cemetery

St. Mary's was established as a parish of the Diocese of Dubuque in 1867. The parish served the 150 English speaking Catholic families who lived in the city's west end because the priest at St. Kunigunda, a German parish, refused to do so. St. Mary's complex was built two blocks to the west of St. Kunigunda, later renamed St. Joseph. Bishop John Hennessy laid the church's cornerstone on July 21, 1867. The church property was on the northeastern section of St. Mary's Cemetery, which was established by Bishop Mathias Loras in 1849. The property for the cemetery was purchased from Judge C. G. R. Mitchell, who had also donated the land for St. Kunigunda. The church was built in 1867 for $25,000 and the parish paid $8,000 to build the rectory ten years later.

Rev. J.A.M. Pelamourgues of St. Anthony's downtown Davenport was its first pastor. The first resident pastor was the Rev. Maurice Flavin who came to St. Mary's on May 10, 1868, and continued to serve the parish until 1871 when he was replaced with his brother, the Rev. Michael Flavin. The parish became a part of the Diocese of Davenport when it was established in 1881.

In 1883 the church acquired a new pipe organ that was built by the Moline Pipe Organ Co. One of the organist at the church was Célestine Fejérvary. She visited Europe ten years later and while she was in Belgium she acquired a painting by Guido Reni, the Assumption of the Blessed Virgin for St Mary's. Both the organ and the painting remain in the church.

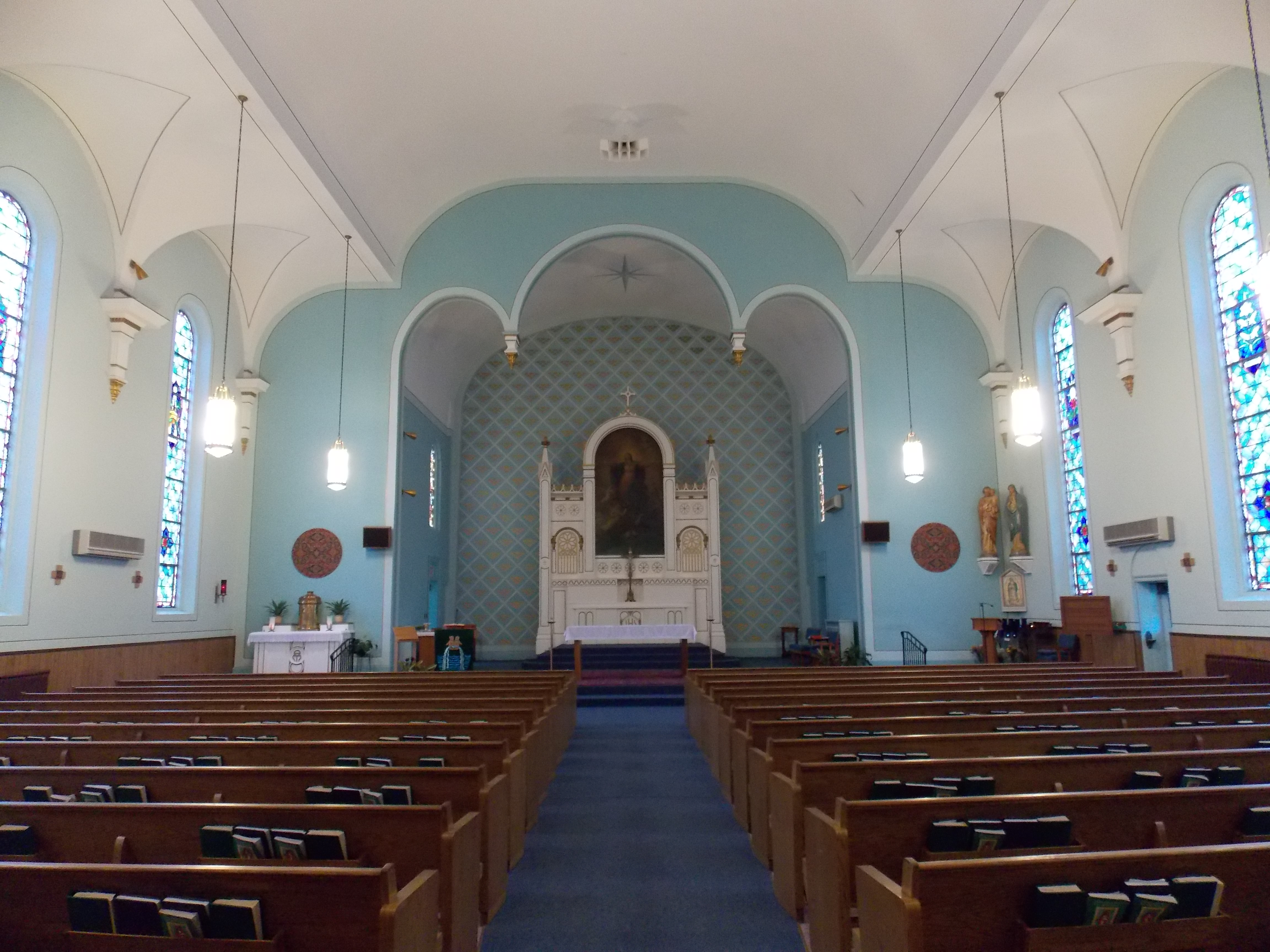
Church interior

In 1898 St. Mary's helped establish a new parish in the northwest section of Davenport, Holy Family. The Redemptorists started St. Alphonsus Church to serve the working-class neighborhoods in the west end in 1908. From that year the parish boundaries for St. Mary's were established.

At the turn of the 20th century, the parish initiated a building project that established the school and convent across the street from the church and rectory. Both of the new buildings were completed in 1901 and they were designed by the Davenport architectural firm of Clausen & Burrows. The convent was completed for $7,000 and school for $19,000. William Kelly served as the contractor for the convent and Coen & Company for the school.

A new reredos was built in the early 1940s that incorporated the Reni painting. A faulty smoke stack leading to the chimney created a fire that did an estimated $50,000 in damage to the church on Christmas Eve 1947. The fire mainly damaged the west side of the church, which included its altars. Christmas Masses were moved to the school auditorium. The Rev. Leo Kerrigan was the pastor at the time.

In the late 1980s, the city's Spanish-speaking community came to St. Mary's. Liturgies were celebrated in English, Spanish, and eventually in Latin.

A tornado struck Davenport on October 6, 2016. It did some damage to the church and other parish buildings. The church was repaired, along with several other Catholic churches in the city, in the summer of 2017. Repairs were also made to the rectory, parish center, and a shed.

In October 2019, Bishop Thomas Zinkula announced that he was considering a merger between St. Mary's and one or more parishes in the city. He said the decision was brought on by the declining number of parishioners, a lack of financial resources, and the declining number of priests in the diocese. According to parishioners and members of the parish council and finance council, St. Mary’s finances were sound. Liquid funds were enough for several months’ expenses, and investments were substantial. Attendance at the Latin and Spanish Masses was steadily growing, with new families joining the parish regularly. After amicable meetings between the bishop and affected parishioners, in March 2020 it was announced that St. Mary's would merge with St. Anthony's Church downtown on July 1. The Latin Mass relocated to Holy Family Church. Because St. Anthony's needs to renovate their religious education facilities, the merger with St. Mary's will not be completed until the end of the year.

=== Jubilee Center ===
In December 2020, the parish complex was purchased by Humility Homes & Services. It is a nonprofit organization operated by the Davenport-based religious order of sisters the Congregation of the Humility of Mary. Humility Homes provides housing and services for people who are homeless. Plans call for the former convent to be used for office space, housing for women in the former rectory, and the former church will be converted into the Fresh Start Center where people who are establishing homes can acquire the necessary items for free. All the religious and liturgical items in the church will be removed. The former school will continue to serve as a gathering space for community groups, especially the area's Hispanic community who were associated with the parish. The campus will be referred to as the Jubilee Center.

== Parochial school ==
The parish established a school a year after the parish was formed. The church acted as the first school building. A larger school building used by the parish was built by the Rev. Michael Flavin two blocks to the north of the church. The Sisters of Mercy had already been teaching in the school when the new building opened. The current school building was built by Msgr. J.P. Ryan directly across the street from the church in 1901. The Sisters of the Holy Cross replaced the Mercy Sisters at this time. Sister Mary Engelbart, OSC served as their first superior. The school was only for girls until 1931 when the high school girls began attending Immaculate Conception Academy. The parish continued to support its own school until declining enrollments forced it to merge schools with neighboring St. Joseph parish. The merged school was named Holy Trinity and it continued into the 1990s when St. Mary's ended the merger.

== Architecture ==
The four buildings that form the parish complex sit across the street from each other and visually form a unified complex. Their exteriors are all composed of dark red brick, although the convent has subsequently been covered in vinyl siding. The church was built in the Romanesque Revival style, with a rectangular plan, decorative brickwork and a central bell tower that rises 135 feet (41 m). The exterior features corbelling and brick pilasters on the sides that frame the tall narrow windows, which are capped by plain round-arched hoods. There is a concentration of ornamentation on the upper portion of the tower. It includes gablets with cross finials, round-arched louvers in the bell-chamber and small oculi that are placed halfway up the spire.

The rectory was initially built in either the Italianate or Romanesque Revival style to match the church next door. Its style was changed about the time the convent and school were built in 1901. They were both designed in the Colonial Revival style.

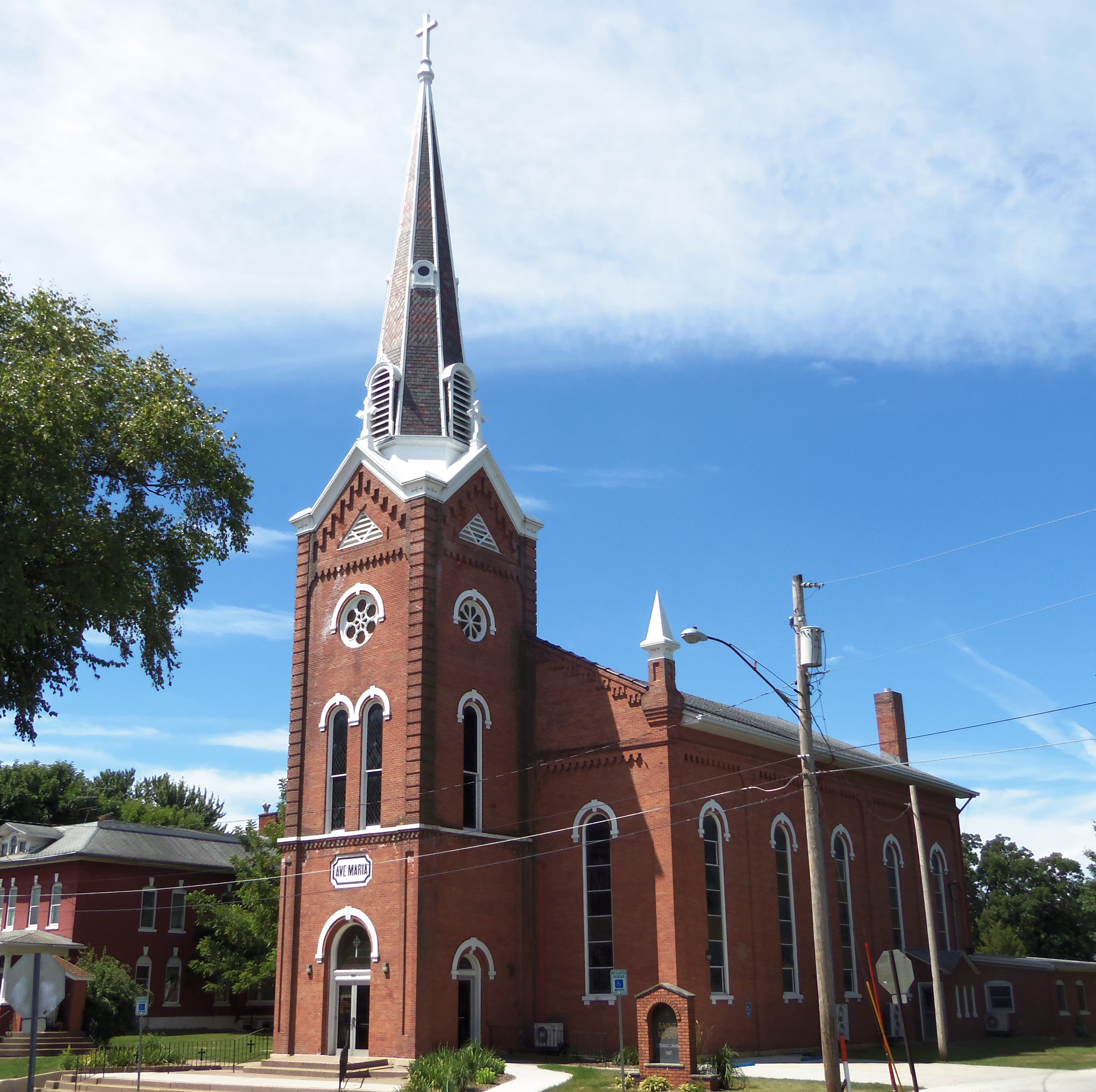
The church in 2013

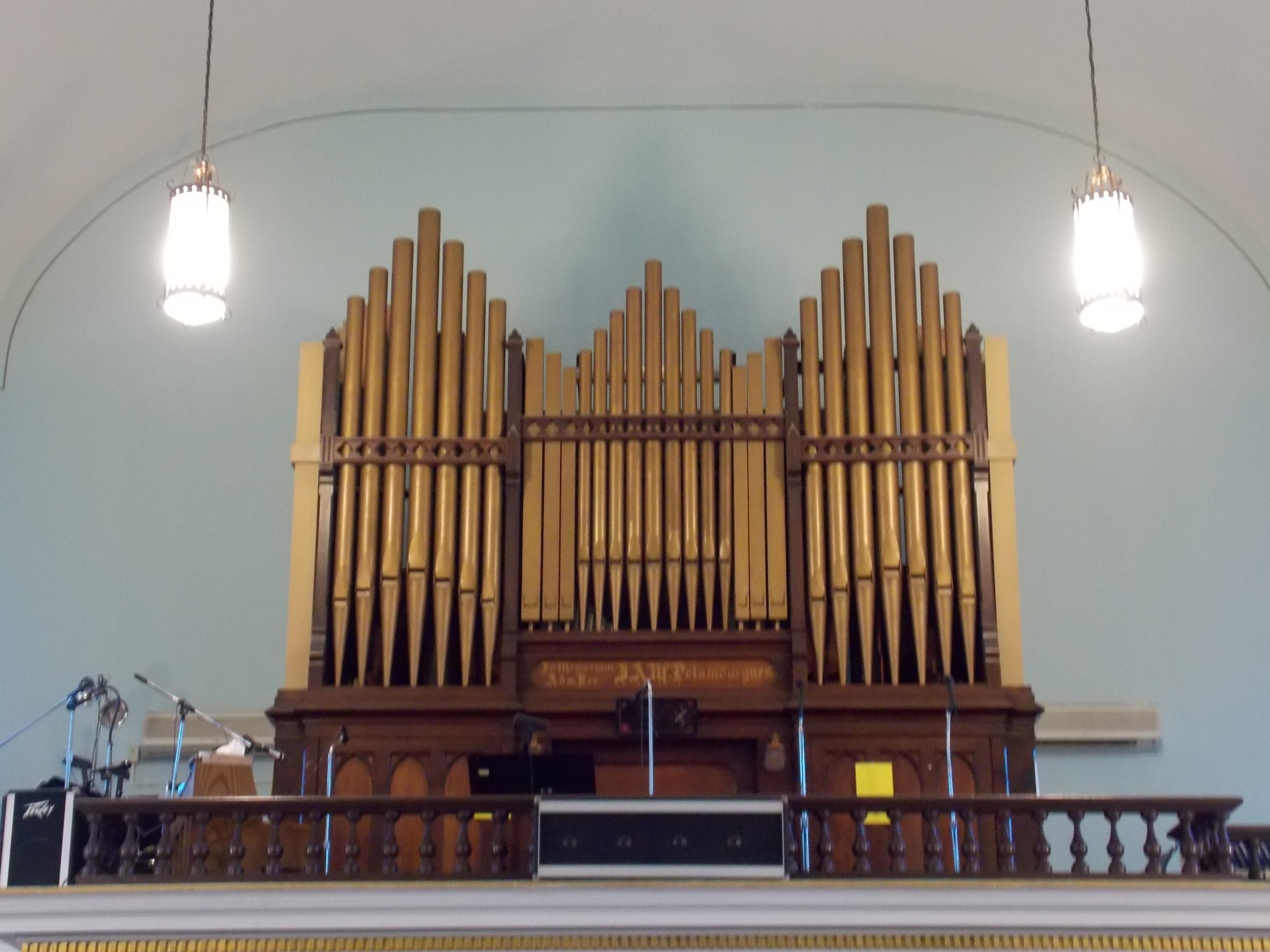
The Moline pipe organ

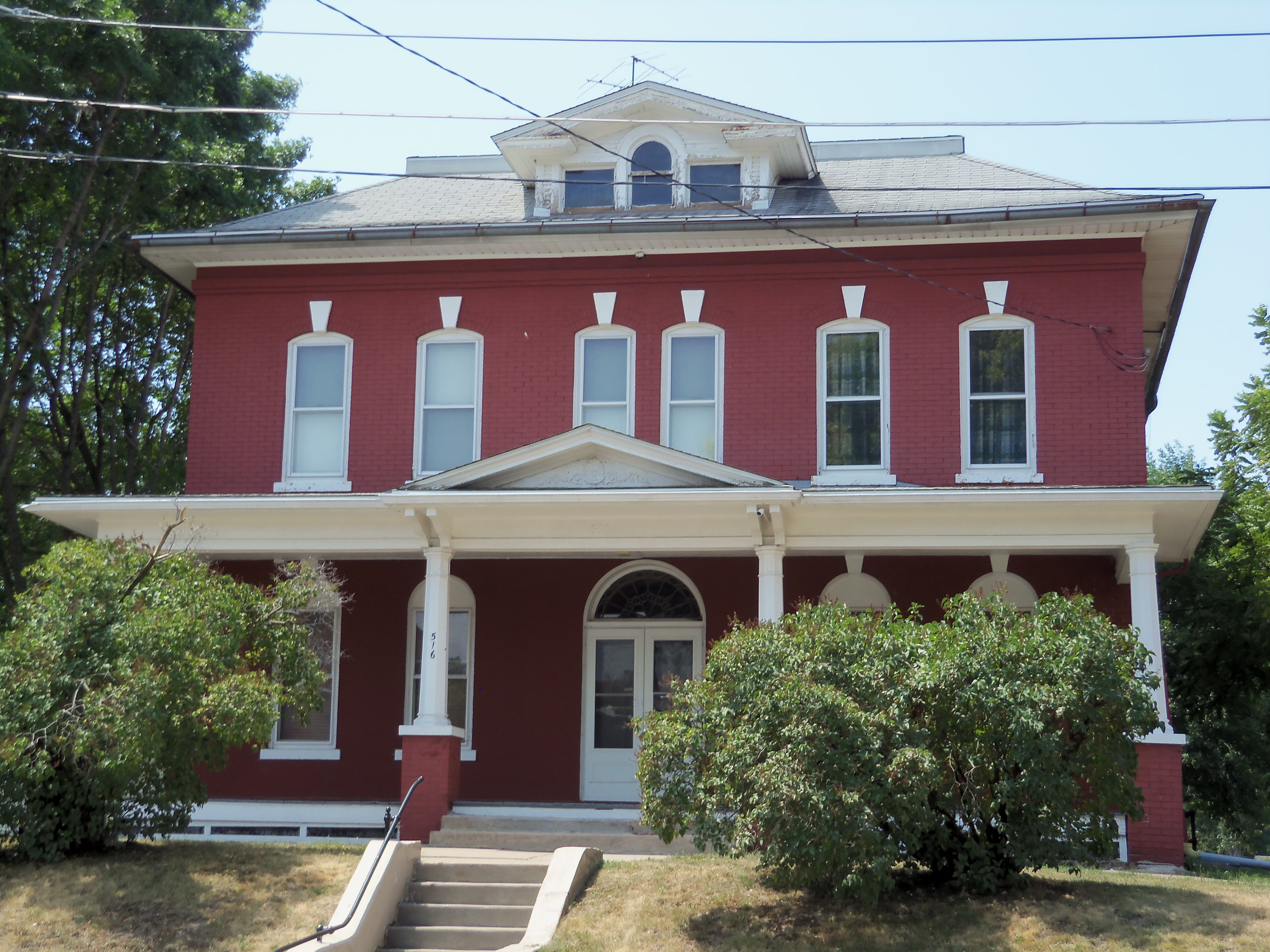
Rectory

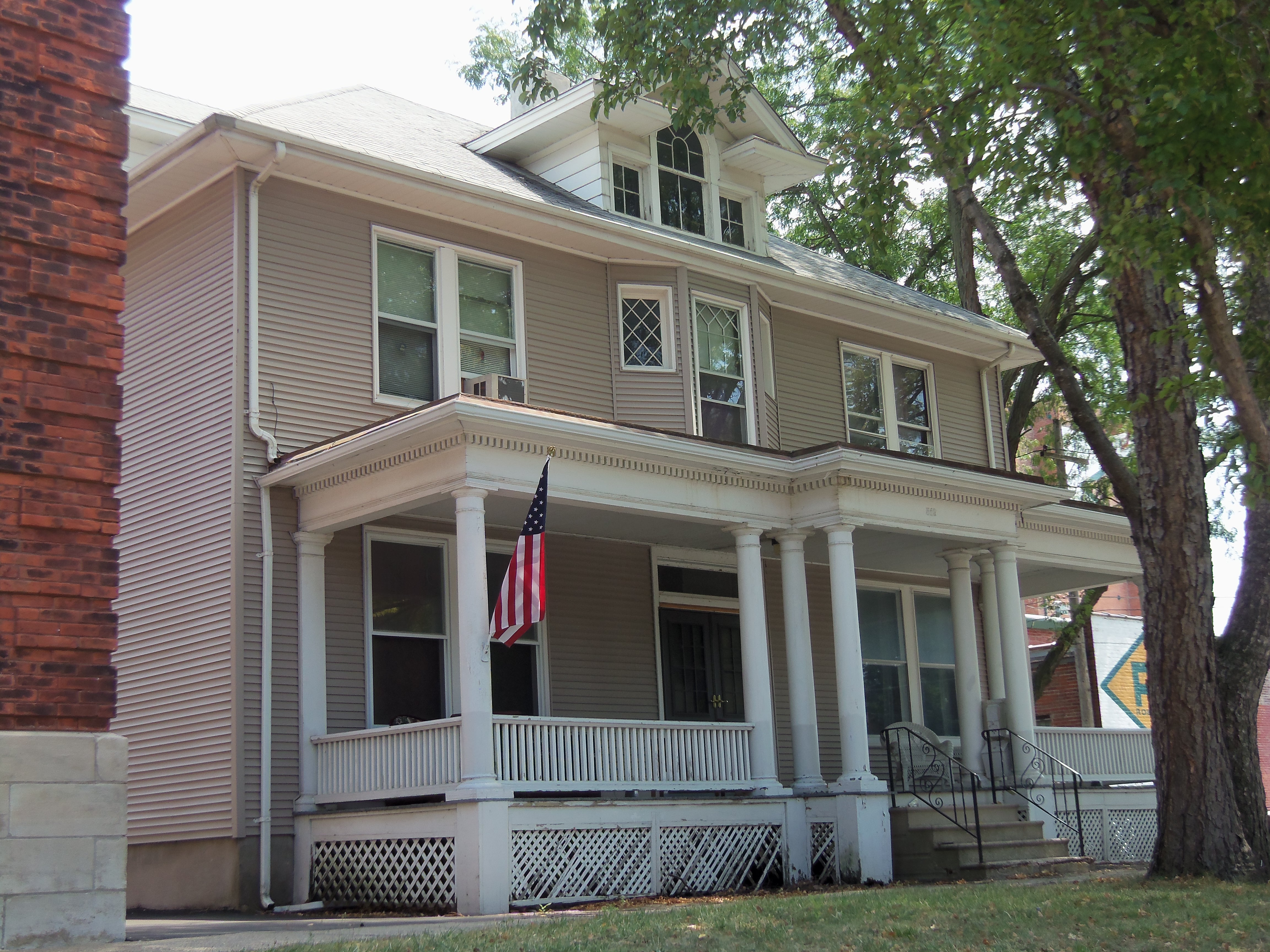
Convent

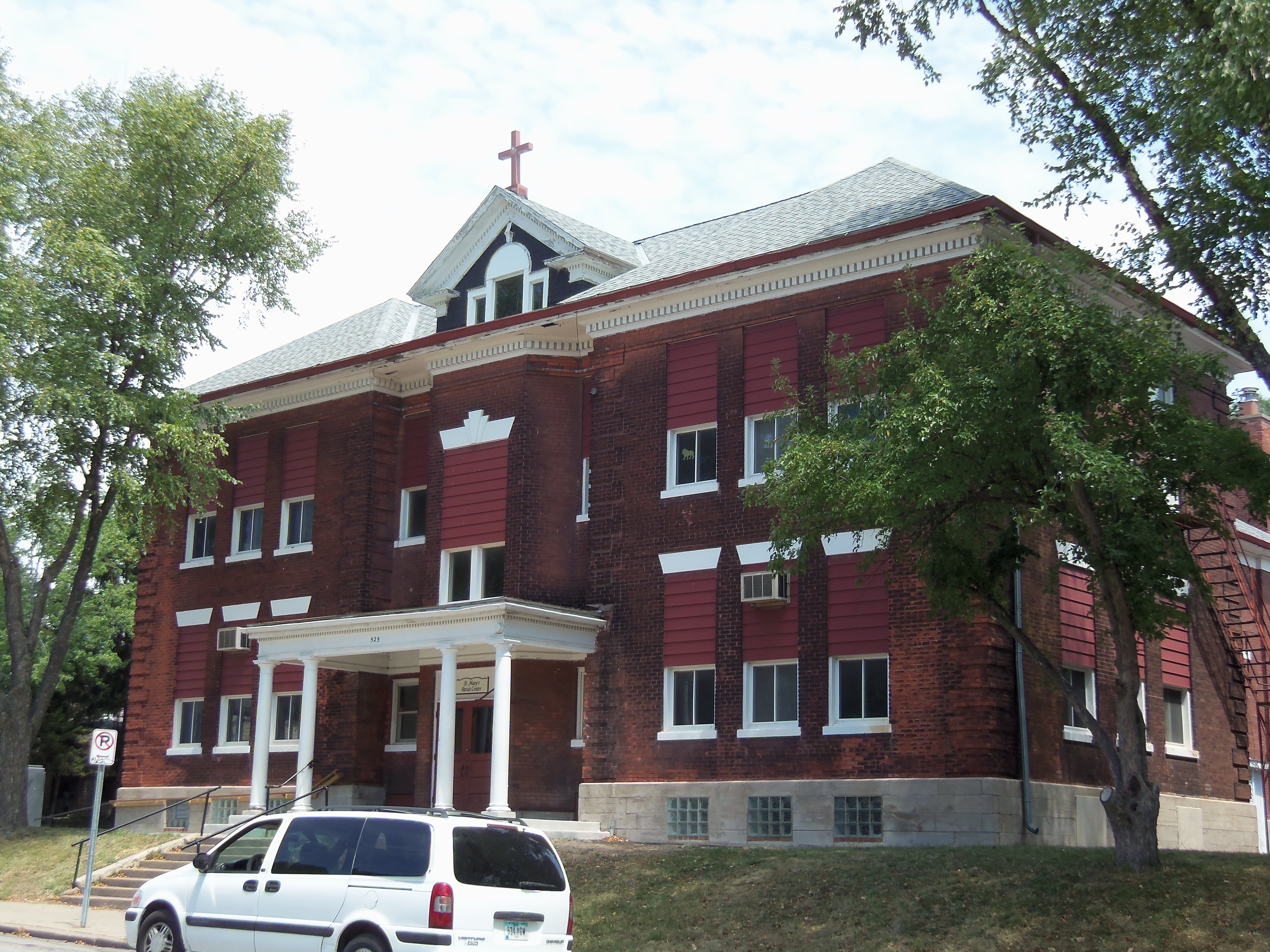
School (Parish Hall)

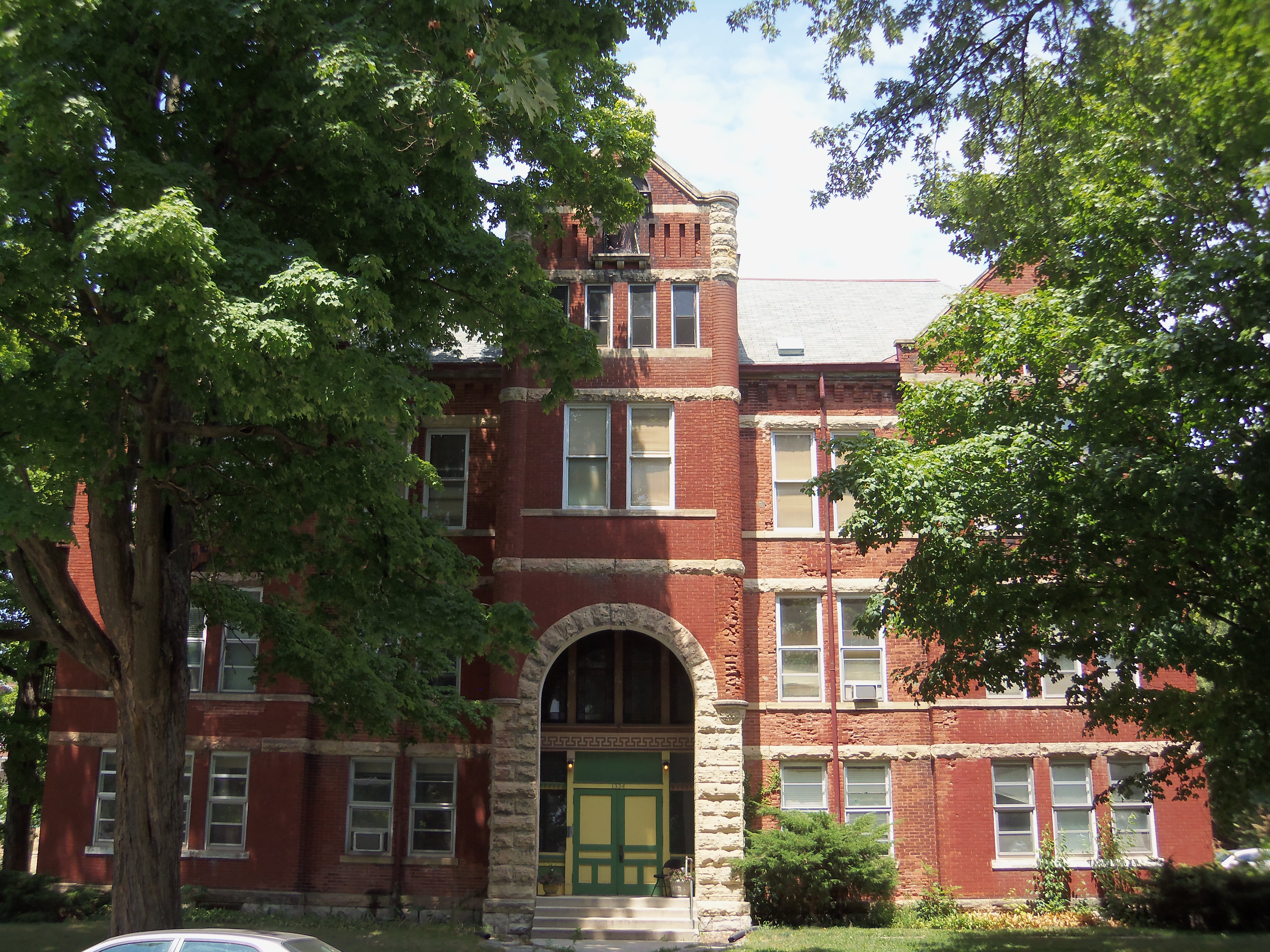
First school building

== Pipe organ ==
Moline Organ Co. pipe organ (1883) features two manuals, 18 stops, slider chests and mechanical key action.

Stoplist:

GREAT 58

- 16' Sub Bass 58w
- 8' Open Diapason 58m
- 8' Dulciana 58m
- 8' Melodia 58w
- 4' Principal 58m
- 4' Flute d' Amour 58w&m
- 2 2/3' Twelfth 58m
- 2' Fifteenth 58m
- 8' Trumpet 58m

SWELL 58

- 8' Open Diapason 58w&m
- 8' Salicional (1-7 St. Diap.) 51m
- 8' Stopped Diapason 58w
- 8' Quintadena 58m
- 4' Fugara 58m
- 2' Violini (sic.) 58m
- 8' Oboe TC 46m
- 8' Bassoon 12m
- Tremolo (original label missing)

PEDALE 27

- 16' Grand Open Diapason 27w
- 16' Lieblich Bourdon 27w
- Pedale Check

COUPLERS

- Great to Pedale
- Swell to Pedale
- Swell to Great

COMPOSITION PEDALS

- Gr. Piano
- Gr. Forte
- Sw. Piano
- Sw. Forte
- Great to Pedale (reversible)
