= Fred B. Sharon House =

Historic house in Iowa, United States

- U.S. National Register of Historic Places
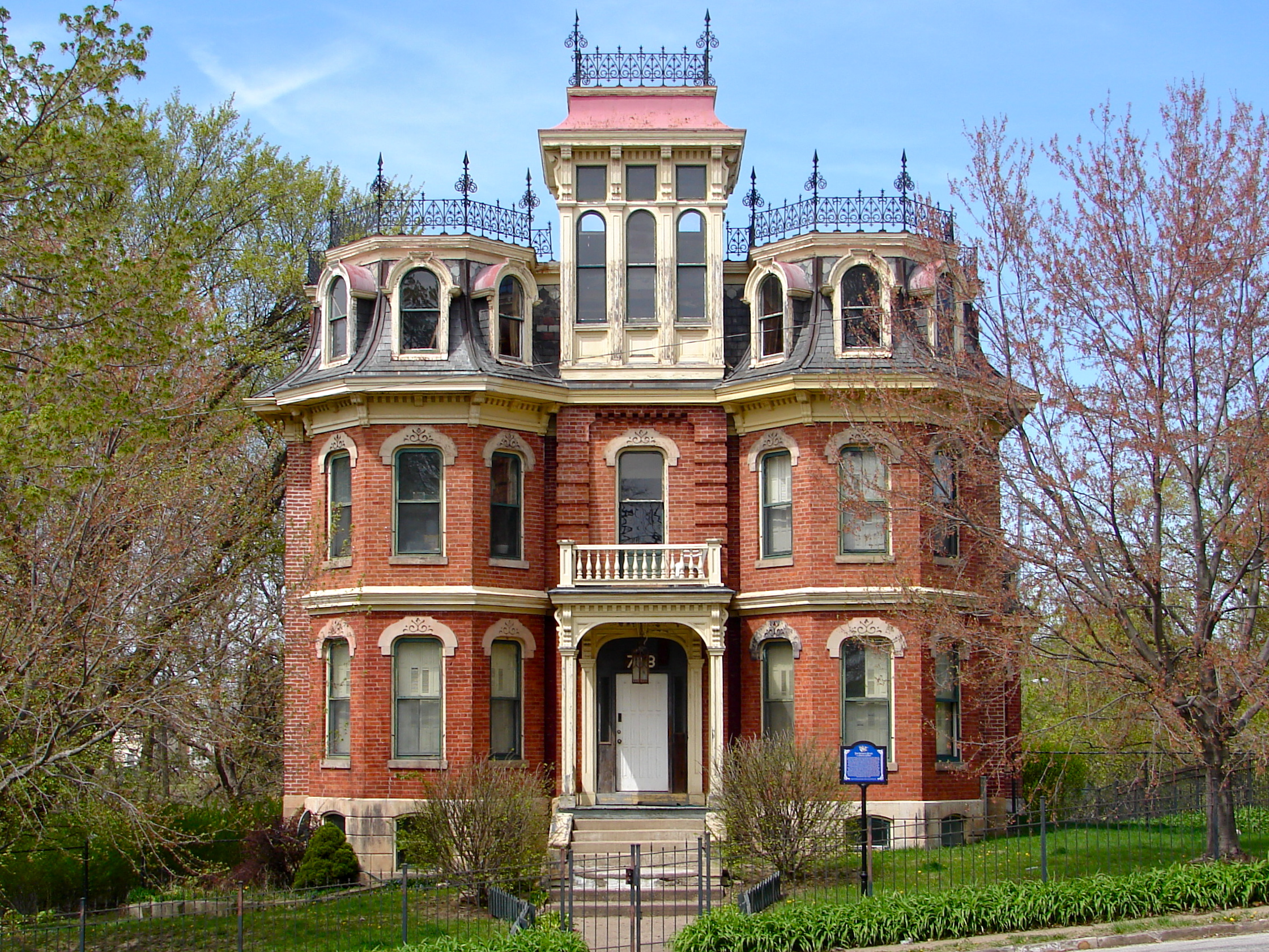

- Location within Iowa Location within the United States
- Location: 728 Farnam St. Davenport, Iowa
- Coordinates: 41°31′39″N 90°34′1″W
- Area: less than one acre
- Built: 1891
- Architectural style: Second Empire
- MPS: Davenport MRA
- NRHP reference No.: 83002503
- Added to NRHP: July 7, 1983

The Fred B. Sharon House is a historic building located in the Cork Hill neighborhood of Davenport, Iowa, United States. It was listed on the National Register of Historic Places in 1983.

== Fred B. Sharon ==
Originally a high school teacher from New York City, Fred B. Sharon became a prominent businessman, newspaper publisher and postmaster in the city of Davenport. Together with his brother Thomas, Fred Sharon arrived in Davenport in 1882 to publish the Messenger. After his brother's death six years later, Fred took over sole management of the paper, renamed it the Iowa Catholic Messenger and guided it for nearly fifty years. The paper contained news pertaining to the Catholic Church as well as Irish and German nationalistic writings. In 1931 Pope Pius XI conferred upon him a Papal honor as a Knight of St. Gregory, upon the nomination of Bishop Henry Rohlman. Because of financial problems related to the Great Depression, he was forced to sell the paper in 1936 to the Diocese of Davenport, who then published it in national and diocesan editions as The Catholic Messenger.

In addition to the paper, Sharon also was an incorporator of several banks, including the Home Building Loan and Savings Association, Union Savings Bank, and Citizens Trust. He also served as the incorporator of the Hibernian Hall Association. Sharon was a charter member of the Ancient Order of Hibernians in Davenport and the Loras Council of the Knights of Columbus. President Woodrow Wilson appointed him the Davenport postmaster in 1913 and he served in that capacity for almost nine years. Sharon died on July 10, 1949, and he is buried in Mt. Calvary Cemetery in Davenport.

== Architecture ==
Sharon's home is a three-story, brick, Second Empire structure. It follows a T-plan with a prominent center tower and a side wing. The elegant mansard roof is topped with decorative wrought iron cresting. The windows on the first and second floors are rectangular in shape while those on the third floor are arched. The tower itself features a large window area. Because of its late date it possess overall symmetry of form. Its strong verticality and its richly ornamented roofscape are clear indications that it was built during the Victorian era. The front porch is a replication of the original.
