= St. Joseph's Catholic Church (Davenport, Iowa) =

- St. Joseph’s Catholic Church
- U.S. National Register of Historic Places
- Davenport Register of Historic Properties
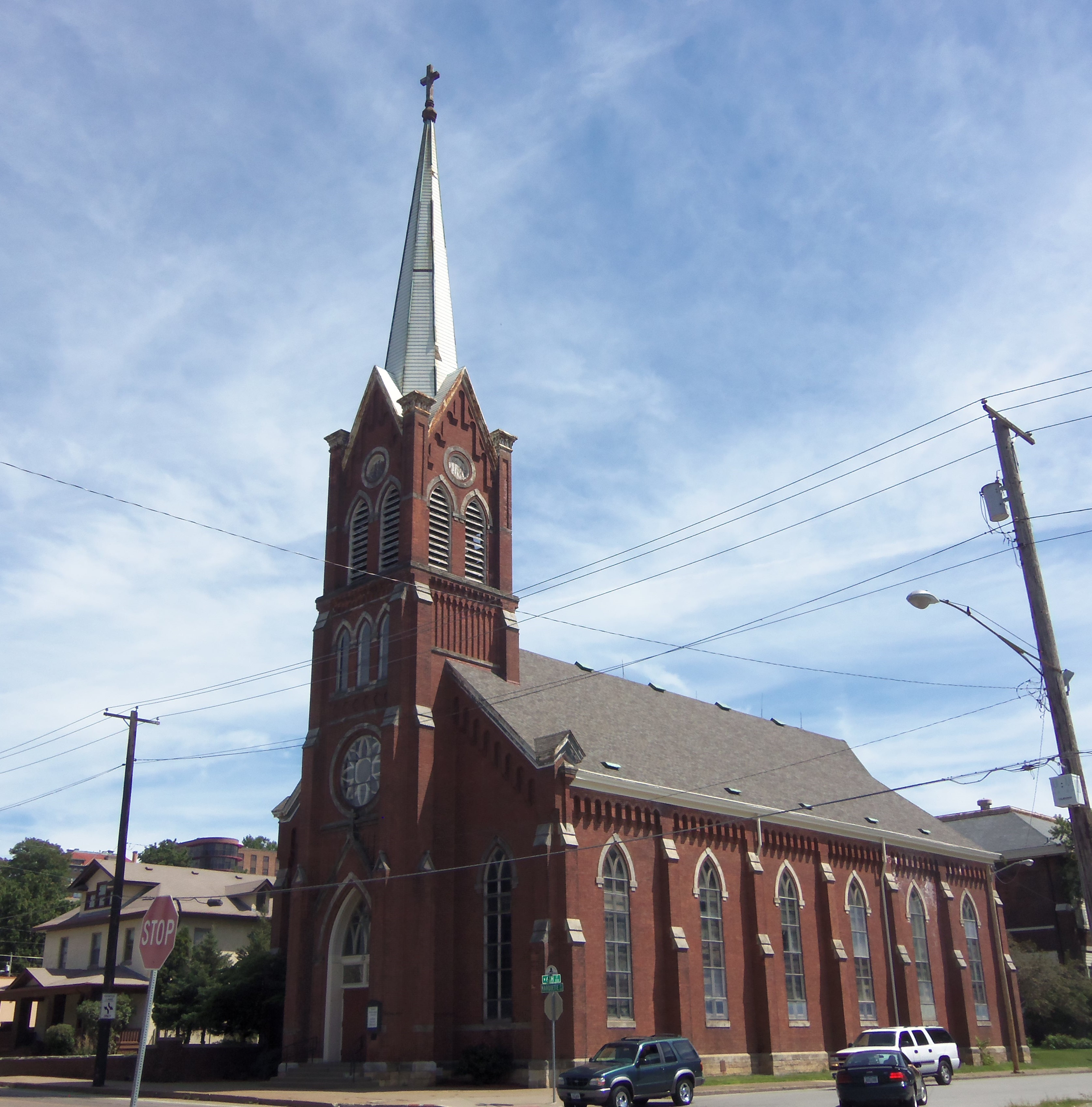
- St. Joseph Church in 2013

- Location within Iowa Location within the United States
- Location: West Sixth and Marquette Streets; Davenport, Iowa
- Coordinates: 41°31′33.09″N 90°35′25.76″W
- Area: less than one acre
- Built: 1881
- Architect: Victor Huot
- Architectural style: Gothic Revival
- MPS: Davenport MRA
- NRHP reference No.: 83002510
- DRHP No.: 31

Significant dates
- Added to NRHP: July 7, 1983
- Designated DRHP: September 1, 1999

St. Joseph Catholic Church is a former Catholic parish in the Diocese of Davenport. Its former parish church is located in the west end of Davenport, Iowa, United States. It was listed on the National Register of Historic Places in 1983. The church and the rectory were listed together on the Davenport Register of Historic Properties in 1999. After serving as the location of a Reformed Baptist congregation named Grace Fellowship Church and a private elementary school named Marquette Academy, the parish property now houses an evangelical Christian ministry named One Eighty.

== History ==
=== St. Joseph Parish ===
St. Joseph Parish was originally established as St. Kunigunda's in 1855 in the Diocese of Dubuque. It was named for St. Kunigunda, and served the German immigrants who settled in the western part of the city. Judge C.G.R. Mitchell donated the property for the church. A stone building was dedicated May 25, 1856 by the parish's pastor Father Flammang, who conducted the services in Latin and German. He was succeeded in 1857 by Rev. John Baumgarten who stayed for a year, and then the parish was without a pastor for six months. The Rt. Rev. Msgr. Anton Niermann became the pastor on April 2, 1859. Rev. Frank Kottenstette was named assistant pastor in 1900. He was followed by the Revs. Albers P. Stahl, P. Herbst, J. Snyder, and B. Kueppenbender. Msgr. Niermann was succeeded as pastor by the Rev. N.J. Peiffer in 1905.

As the parish continued to grow it was decided to build a new church. The cornerstone was laid in 1881, the same year as the Diocese of Davenport was established. It was at this time that the parish name was changed to St. Joseph, probably because if its proximity to St. Mary's Church which had been built two blocks to the west in 1867. The new church was dedicated on September 16, 1883. The former church building was converted into a school. It is possible that this building was converted into the convent and continues to stand, radically modified, behind the church. St. Joseph School was served by the School Sisters of St. Francis from Milwaukee.

Significant changes occurred starting in the 1960s. The ethnic makeup of the neighborhood around St. Joseph changed. The original German immigrant community was gone and the people who replaced them were largely not Catholic. Changes were made in the liturgy to accommodate the reforms of the Second Vatican Council. The liturgies were now celebrated in English. The communion rail was removed and a new altar, which allowed the priest to face the congregation, was put in place. The old altars and statues, however, remained in the church. By the 1970s sizeable numbers of Mexican Americans began moving into the area, and a liturgy in Spanish was added. The Spanish speaking community stayed until the late 1980s when they moved to St. Mary's.

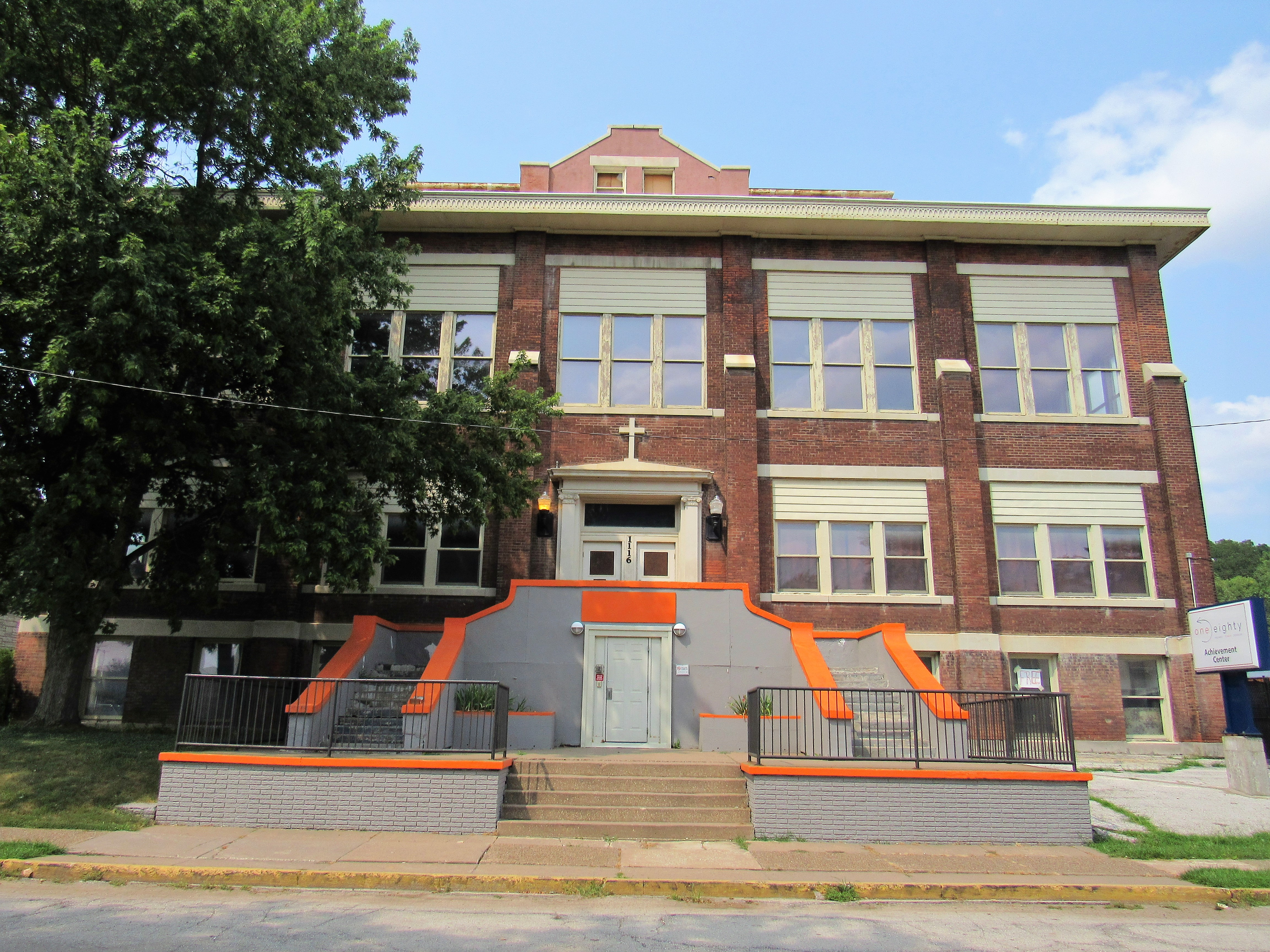
Former school building

=== Post-St. Joseph's ===
The school continued until 1968 when it was merged with St. Mary's School and renamed Holy Trinity. The merger lasted into the 1990s when St. Mary's ended its participation. Because of declining numbers, the diocese decided to close the school in 1999. An independent group of people bought the school that year and it reopened as Holy Trinity Mission School. A few years later it was renamed Marquette Academy. The parish, which never had defined territorial boundaries because it was established as a German ethnic parish, continued to decline in numbers and it was also closed in 1999. The building became a part of Holy Trinity Mission School. In 2008 the church and rectory were purchased by a non-denominational congregation and it became Legacy Church. The church later became Grace Fellowship Church, a Reformed Baptist congregation. The One Eighty ministry acquired the entire St. Joseph Parish property in 2016 as their headquarters. The ministry serves people on the margins in a variety of programs.

== Architecture ==
Davenport architect Victor Huot designed St. Joseph's in the High Victorian Gothic style. Huot had previously designed St. Mary's Church.

The building is a Basilica-plan church with its main entrance at the base of the gable-end tower. It is constructed in brick on a stone foundation. The decorative brickwork, especially the corbel table at the eaves, is one of its most distinguished features. Its verticality is achieved by way of the exaggerated pendant corbelling and the tall, pointed-arch windows. The windows on the main facade, along the side walls and in the apse are all paired lancet windows that are filled with stained glass. There is also a tracery rose window in the tower. The tower itself features a tall, slender spire that rises above sharply-drawn gables on the bell-chamber.
