= Mount Olivet Cemetery (Wheat Ridge, Colorado) =

Cemetery in Wheat Ridge, Colorado

Mount Olivet Catholic Cemetery
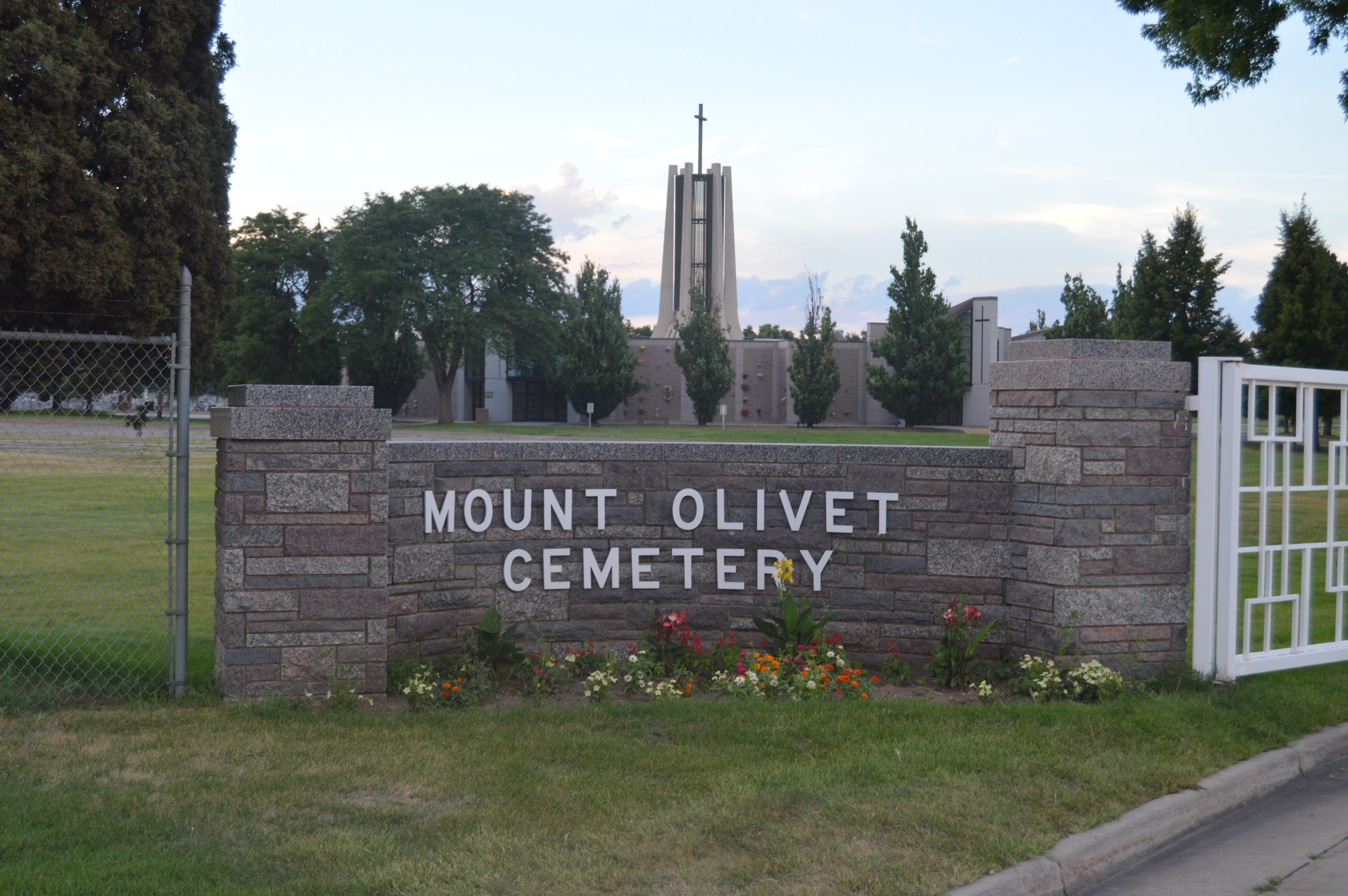
- Interactive map of Mount Olivet Catholic Cemetery

Details
- Established: 1892
- Location: Wheat Ridge, Colorado
- Country: United States
- Coordinates: 39.7820336°N 105.1449212°W
- Type: Catholic
- Owned by: Archdiocese of Denver
- No. of graves: Over 150,000
- Website: https://www.cfcscolorado.org
- Find a Grave: Mount Olivet Catholic Cemetery

Mount Olivet Cemetery is a Catholic cemetery operated by the Archdiocese of Denver. The cemetery is located at 12801 W. 44th Avenue in Wheat Ridge, Colorado. It is the first cemetery owned and operated by the Archdiocese of Denver, the second being Saint Simeon Catholic Cemetery in Aurora, Colorado.

== History ==
The site of Mt. Olivet Catholic Cemetery was a 440-acre farm located in rural Jefferson County between Denver and Golden which as purchased in the 1860s by Bishop Joseph Projectus Machebeuf, Denver's first resident bishop. Bishop Machebeuf later donated the land to the Catholic Diocese of Denver. Mt. Olivet Cemetery now includes 393 acres.

Mt. Olivet Cemetery was consecrated on September 25, 1892 by Bishop Nicholas Chrysostom Matz. On that day, a special Union Pacific train left Denver Union Station carrying 1,500 people to Mt. Olivet for the cemetery consecration. Bishop Matz officiated at the dedication and described Mt. Olivet as the “new City of the Dead.” The primary Denver cemetery until that time had been Prospect Hill Cemetery, southeast of the city. In 1890 the city designated those grounds to be turned into a park. The Catholic section of Prospect Hill Cemetery was then renamed Mount Calvary Cemetery. The first burial at Mt. Olivet Cemetery was Elizabeth Kelley of Annunciation Parish on July 5, 1892.

An examination of the record book of Mt. Olivet tells a graphic history of the times. Causes of death entered in the late 1800s include “died of softening of the brain,” and “died of acute insanity,” and “died of cramps.” Other poignant entries include a mother and child “killed by Indians” August 26, 1868. Six members of another family were killed in a snow slide on March 10, 1884; 12 members of the family now lie together, side by side, at Mt. Olivet.

Relatively isolated, visitors often came to Mt. Olivet by horse and buggy. Union Pacific funeral trains made almost daily trips from Denver to Mt. Olivet. The trains were met by teams of ponies or horses, hitched to funeral biers, to travel up the long drive into the cemetery proper. It took almost an entire day for a funeral cortege to travel by train to Mt. Olivet and back to Denver. Later, interurban street cars served as funeral cars.

In 1871, the first tram service from Denver was by horse-drawn trams. In 1886, they were replaced by electric trams. The route from Denver to Golden was known as the “Wishbone” Route and was luxury, comfort, and speed. In 1891, Bishop Matz announced that Old Calvary Cemetery had been condemned by the city of Denver and proclaimed that Catholics should use Mount Olivet Cemetery for burials. The Union Pacific Railroad agreed to build a funeral car, special funeral train, and a depot near the cemetery. The charge for roundtrip was fifty cents.

Colorado's largest and most deadly influenza outbreak arrived on or about September 20, 1918. It did not take long for it to spread throughout the state. On October 7, a statewide advisory was posted to close public places and gatherings. By October 16, people were prohibited from entering Colorado by rail or horseback. People coming from other states were quarantined at least two days at all of the borders. All schools and government offices were closed for weeks and weeks. This pandemic was the largest outbreak in recorded history, spanned from 1918 to 1925. Victims of the outbreak are buried in many locations at Mt. Olivet cemetery including Sections 12, 14, 22, and 26.

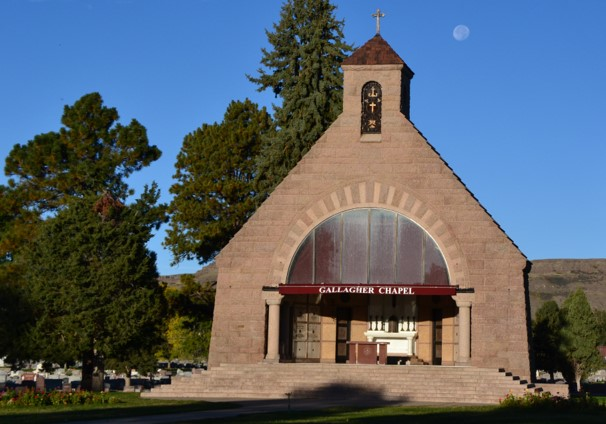
Gallagher Memorial Chapel

Gallagher Memorial Chapel, dedicated in 1939, “stands guard” over the entire Mt. Olivet Cemetery. Mary J. Gallagher donated the chapel as a mausoleum for the Bishops and Archbishops of Denver, in memory of her husband “Reddy” Gallagher. Reddy Gallagher was a red-headed, colorful boxer and wrestler who was a major proponent of the sport of boxing in Denver and had a long career as a sports columnist for The Denver Post.

Mt. Olivet succeeded Mt. Calvary, the first Catholic cemetery in Denver, located at 900 York Street, which is now part of Cheesman Park and the Denver Botanic Gardens. After Mt. Olivet became the principal Catholic cemetery, Mt. Calvary was closed. In 1950, the land of Mt. Calvary Cemetery was sold by the Archdiocese of Denver to the City of Denver with the provision that it would not be used for commercial purposes, and that the city would pay the expenses of reinterring the bodies from Mt. Calvary to Mt. Olivet.

In 1950, from June to September, the remains of more than 7,000 persons were moved from Mt. Calvary to Mt. Olivet. Most of the bodies were reinterred in Section 24 while about 1,000 where buried elsewhere at Mt. Olivet, in family plots. Extraordinary care was taken to ensure that the remains of each person were carefully identified and transferred and the new burial spot was painstakingly marked. Of the total buried at Mt. Calvary, approximately 50% were infants and children. Amazing mementos were found when graves were opened. Several disinterred bodies were of men in full military uniform, including spurs and swords. One grave contained several newspapers dating back to April 22, 1905; a copy of The Boston Post headlined the opening game of the American League between Philadelphia and Boston, in which Rube Waddell saved the day for Philadelphia.

Another astonishing tale from men who worked on the project relates that when the grave of an Irish woman from Leadville was uncovered, the scent of rose petals filled the air. There was great consternation that the body of a saint might have been disinterred. Sanctity terrified all the created great problems for Church officials who had to verify or deny the saintliness. Despite intensive research by The Denver Catholic Register, the Irish woman remains a mystery.

Some of the greatest orators of Denver preached at the Memorial Day Masses. Orators like Msgr. William O’Ryan, Msgr. Hugh L. McMenamin, Msgr. Francis Walsh, and Fr. E. J. Mannix delivered stirring sermons on patriotism and the virtue of praying for souls of the dead. In one of his sermons at a Memorial Day Mass, Bishop Tihen reportedly urged those at Mass to visit the cemetery often, to bring their picnic lunches and enjoy the beauty as a park of inspiration.

== Notable burials ==
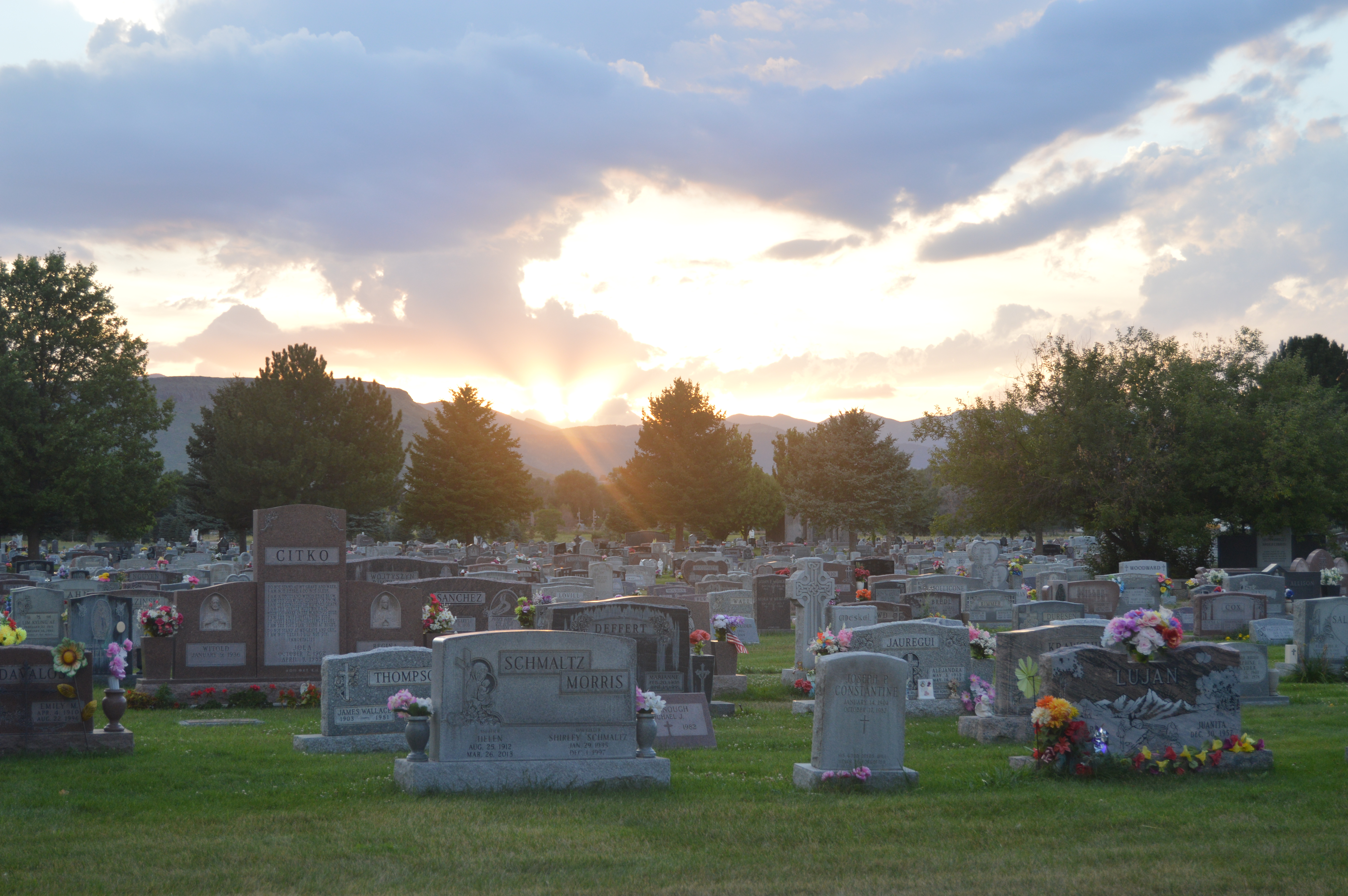
Mount Olivet Cemetery

- Bishop Joseph Projectus Machebeuf, 1st Bishop of Denver (1887–1889)
- Bishop Nicholas Chrysostom Matz, 2nd Bishop of Denver (1889–1917)
- Bishop John Henry Tihen, 3rd Bishop of Denver (1917–1931)
- Archbishop Urban John Vehr, 4th Bishop (1931–1941) and 1st Archbishop of Denver (1941–1967)
- Archbishop James Vincent Casey, 2nd Archbishop of Denver (1967–1986)
- Albert T. Frantz, justice of the Colorado Supreme Court, interred in 1985.
- Julia Greeley ("Denver’s Angel of Charity"), buried at Mt. Olivet Cemetery in 1918. As part of the Cause for Canonization, her remains were transferred to the Cathedral Basilica of the Immaculate Conception on June 7, 2017.
- William Gilpin (governor), 1st Governor of the Territory of Colorado 1861-1862
- John L. "Jack" Swigert Jr., Command Module Pilot aboard Apollo 13 and Colorado Congressman-elect
- Jacques Benedict, one of the most prominent architects in Colorado history
- May Bonfils Stanton, Colorado heiress and philanthropist
- Michael James Dempsey, American-born Catholic bishop in Nigeria
- Jerry McMorris, former principal owner of the Colorado Rockies
- William H. McNichols, Jr., Denver Mayor 1968
- Verner Zevola Reed, Colorado pioneer and businessman
- Mary Johnson Reed, wife of Verner Reed and philanthropist
- Baby Doe Tabor, flamboyant wife of Horace Tabor, and inspiration for the opera The Ballad of Baby Doe
- Horace Tabor, Colorado pioneer and businessman
- Martin D. Currigan, building contractor and city councilman in Denver, Colorado
- John Kernan Mullen, an Irish-American businessman and philanthropist
- John Francis Campion, businessman and philanthropist
- Sister Mary Lucy Downey (Sisters of Charity of Leavenworth), founder of Archdiocesan Housing
- William and Dorothy Harmsen, Founders of Jolly Rancher Candy Company
- Daniel Mauser, Matthew Kechter, Kelly Fleming, victims of the Columbine High School massacre
