= George Roche Evans =

Catholic bishop

His Excellency, The Most Reverend George R. Evans
- Auxiliary Bishop of Denver
- Church: Catholic Church
- See: Titular See of Tubyza
- Appointed: February 24, 1969
- In office: April 23, 1969 - September 13, 1985

Orders
- Ordination: May 31, 1947 by Urban John Vehr
- Consecration: April 23, 1969 by Luigi Raimondi

Personal details
- Born: September 25, 1922 Denver, Colorado, US
- Died: September 13, 1985 (aged 62) Denver

George Roche Evans (September 25, 1922 – September 13, 1985) was a Bishop of the Catholic Church in the United States. He served as an auxiliary bishop of the Archdiocese of Denver from 1969 to 1985.

== Biography ==
=== Early life ===
George Evans was born on September 25, 1922 in Denver, Colorado. He was ordained a priest by Archbishop Urban John Vehr for the Archdiocese of Denver on May 31, 1947 in Denver. Evans served as chancellor and vicar general for the archdiocese.

=== Auxiliary Bishop of Denver ===
On February 24, 1969 Pope Paul VI appointed Evans as titular bishop of Tubyza and auxiliary bishop of Denver. He was consecrated a bishop at the Cathedral of the Immaculate Conception in Denver by Archbishop Luigi Raimondi, the apostolic delegate to the United States, on April 23, 1969. The principal co-consecrators were Archbishop James Casey and Bishop Hubert Newell of Cheyenne. As bishop, he founded the Denver Area Interfaith Clergy.

Evans died of colon cancer on September 13, 1985, in Denver at the age of 62.
