= Jorge Rodríguez-Novelo =

Mexican-born American prelate

His Excellency, The Most Reverend Jorge Humberto Rodríguez-Novelo
- Auxiliary Bishop of Denver; Titular Bishop of Azura
- Archdiocese: Denver
- Appointed: August 25, 2016
- Installed: November 4, 2016
- Other post: Titular Bishop of Azura

Orders
- Ordination: December 24, 1987 by Jean Jérôme Cardinal Hamer
- Consecration: November 4, 2016 by Samuel J. Aquila, James Stafford, and José Horacio Gómez

Personal details
- Born: March 22, 1955 (age 71) Merida, Mexico
- Education: Centre of Classical Humanities; Pontifical Gregorian University; Angelicum University; Pontifical University of St. Thomas Aquinas; Pontifical University Marianum
- Motto: Misericordia eius in progenies et progenies (His mercy is on them that fear Him from generation to generation)

Styles of Jorge Humberto Rodríguez-Novelo
- Reference style: His Excellency; The Most Reverend
- Spoken style: Your Excellency
- Religious style: Bishop

Jorge Humberto Rodríguez-Novelo (born March 22, 1955) is a Mexican-born American Catholic prelate who has served as an auxiliary bishop for the Archdiocese of Denver in Colorado since 2016. He has held teaching positions at Catholic universities and institutions in the United States, Italy and Spain.

== Biography ==
=== Early life ===
Jorge Rodriguez-Novelo was born on March 22, 1955, in Mérida, Mexico. He is the son of Nery Maria Novelo and Ramon Rodriguez, and has one brother and four sisters. Jorge Rodriguez-Novelo attended a Maryknoll Sisters primary school and then a Marist Brothers high school, both in Mérida. After finishing high school, he went to the Centre of Classical Humanities in Salamanca, Spain, to study Latin and Greek. After returning to Mexico, Rodriguez-Novelo performed missionary work in Chetumal in the Yucatán region.

Deciding to become a priest, Rodriguez-Novelo then entered the novitiate period for the Legionaries of Christ religious order. On April 2, 1982, he took his solemn vows in the Legionaries of Christ.

The Legionaries sent Rodriguez-Novelo to Rome to study at the Pontifical Gregorian University, where in 1984 he received a Licentiate in Philosophy. After starting his bachelor's degree studies at the Angelicum University in Rome, he was named as an academic assistant of philosophical studies at the Center for Higher Studies of the Legionaries of Christ in Rome.

In 1987, Rodriguez-Novelo was awarded a Bachelor of Theology degree from the Pontifical University of St. Thomas Aquinas and a Diploma in Mariological Studies from the Pontifical University Marianum. He was ordained as a deacon by Cardinal Justin Rigali in Rome that same year.

=== Priesthood ===
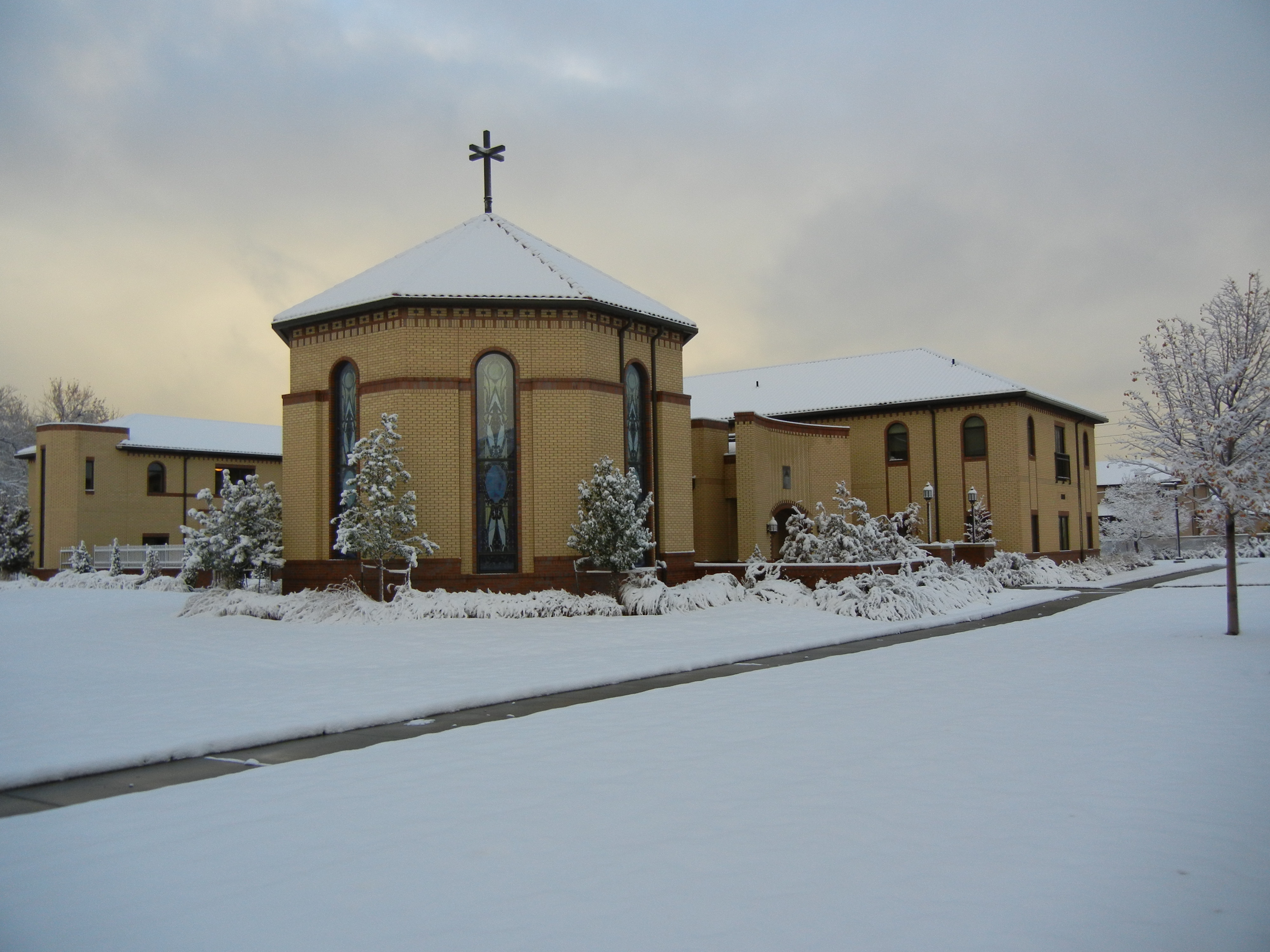
St. John Vianney Theological Seminary, Denver, Colorado (2012)

Rodriguez-Novelo was ordained a priest in Rome at the Basilica of Our Lady of Guadalupe and St. Filippo Martire for the Legionaries of Christ by Cardinal Jean Hamer on December 24, 1987.

After his ordination, the Legionaries kept Rodriguez-Novelo in Rome to work at the Center for Higher Studies and other academic institutions. They also assigned him as a pastoral associate at Our Lady of Guadalupe Parish in the city. The Legionaries appointed Rodriguez-Novelo as prefect of theological studies at the Center for Higher Studies in 1989.

In 1990, Rodriguez-Novelo received his Licentiate in Sacred Theology from the Gregorian University and was named a professor there. He was awarded a Doctor of Theology degree in 1994 from the Gregorian. That same year, the Legionaries appointed him as general prefect of studies at the Center for Higher Studies. During this same period, Rodriguez-Novelo worked as a professor and dean of the Department of Theology at the Pontifical Athenaeum Regina Apostolarum in Rome. He also lectured for one year in theology at Francisco de Vitoria University in Madrid, Spain.

In 1999, the Legionaries sent Rodriguez-Novelo to Colorado in the United States to assume positions in the Archdiocese of Denver. He was first assigned as associate pastor of St. Therese Parish in Aurora, Colorado. In 2000, he was also named associate director of vocations for Hispanic discernment for the archdiocese. In 2001, Rodriguez-Novelo left St. Therese to become vice president of the Our Lady of the New Advent Theological Institute and vice prefect of studies at the new St. John Vianney Theological Seminary, both in Denver.Rodriguez-Novelo returned to Rome in 2002 to serve as associate pastor of Stella Mans Parish in Ostia, Rome. During this stay, he also served as a professor and associate director of the Spirituality Year. In 2006, Rodriguez-Novelo moved back to Denver and was assigned by the Legionaries as pastoral assistant at Saint Michael the Archangel Parish in Aurora, Colorado, and Holy Family Parish in Denver. He was also named vice rector of St. Vianney Seminary.

In 2006, Rodriguez-Novelo was incardinated, or transferred, from the Legionaries of Christ to the Archdiocese of Denver in 2008. In 2010, the diocese named Rodriguez-Novelo as an ex-officio member of the presbyteral council and as parochial vicar for Ascension Parish in Denver. He assumed the roles of pastor in 2012 at Holy Cross Parish in Thornton, Colorado and professor in 2014 at St. John Vianney Seminary.

=== Auxiliary Bishop of Denver ===
Pope Francis appointed Rodríguez-Novelo as an auxiliary bishop for Denver on August 25, 2016. On November 4, 2016, he was consecrated by Archbishop Samuel Aquila at the Cathedral Basilica of the Immaculate Conception in Denver, with Cardinal James Stafford and Archbishop José Horacio Gómez serving as co-consecrators.

== See also ==
- Catholic Church hierarchy
- Catholic Church in the United States
- Historical list of the Catholic bishops of the United States
- List of Catholic bishops of the United States
- Lists of patriarchs, archbishops, and bishops

== Episcopal succession ==
Catholic Church titles
Preceded by –	Auxiliary Bishop of Denver; 2016–present	Succeeded by -
