= Nicholas Chrysostom Matz =

Catholic Bishop of Denver (died 1917)

His Excellency, The Right Reverend Nicholas Chrysostom Matz
- Bishop of Denver; Titular Bishop of Telmissus
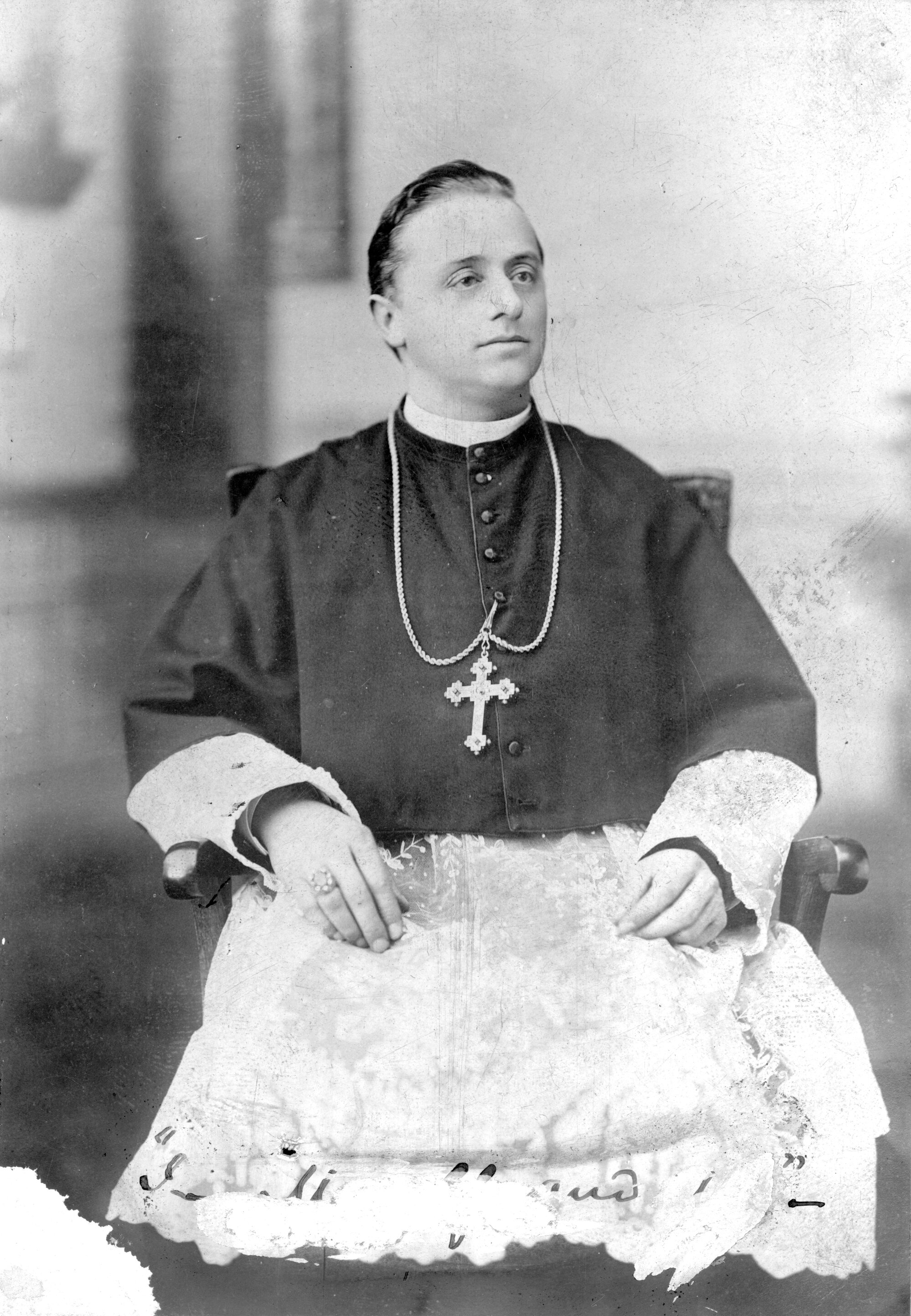
- Church: Catholic Church
- See: Denver
- In office: July 10, 1889 to August 9, 1917
- Predecessor: Joseph Projectus Machebeuf
- Successor: John Henry Tihen

Orders
- Ordination: May 31, 1874 by Joseph Projectus Machebeuf
- Consecration: October 28, 1887 by Jean-Baptiste Salpointe

Personal details
- Born: April 6, 1850 Munster, Lorraine, France
- Died: August 9, 1917 (aged 67) Denver, Colorado, US

Nicholas Chrysostom Matz (April 6, 1850 – August 9, 1917) was a French-born prelate of the Catholic Church. He served as bishop of Denver in Colorado from 1889 until his death in 1917.

== Biography ==
=== Early life ===
Nicholas Matz was born in Munster, Moselle (Lorraine), in France to Antoine and Marie-Anne (Boul) Matz. He began his classical course at the minor seminary of Fénétrange in 1865.

In 1868, he and his family came to the United States, where they settled at Cincinnati, Ohio. He then studied for the priesthood at St. Francis Seminary and Mount St. Mary's of the West Seminary, both in Cincinnati. While in Cincinnati, Matz in 1869 met Bishop Joseph Projectus Machebeuf, stopping there on his way to the East Coast. Machebeuf recruited Matz to finish his preparation for the priesthood in Denver, Colorado, in the newly erected Apostolic Vicariate of Colorado.

=== Priesthood ===
Matz was ordained a priest by Machebeuf for the Apostolic Vicariate of Colorado in Denver on May 31, 1874. He then served as a curate at the cathedral of Denver until 1877, when he became pastor of Our Lady of Lourdes Parish in Georgetown, Colorado, a booming mining town in the Rocky Mountains While at Our Lady, he erected a church, a parochial school, and a hospital, which he placed under the care of the Sisters of St. Joseph. Matz was transferred to St. Anne's Parish in Denver in 1885.

=== Coadjutor Bishop and Bishop of Denver ===
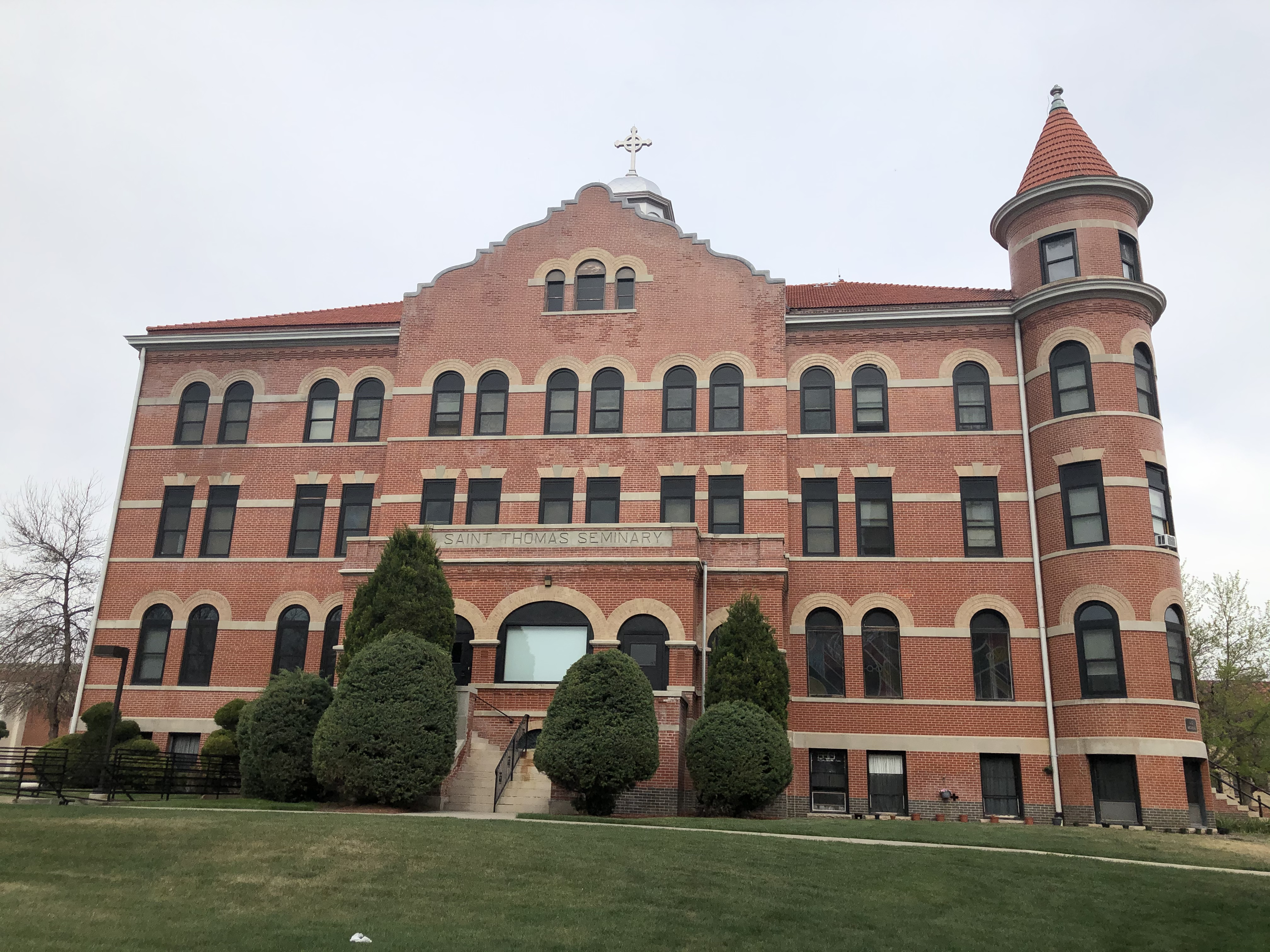
Former Saint Thomas Seminary, Denver, Colorado (2020)

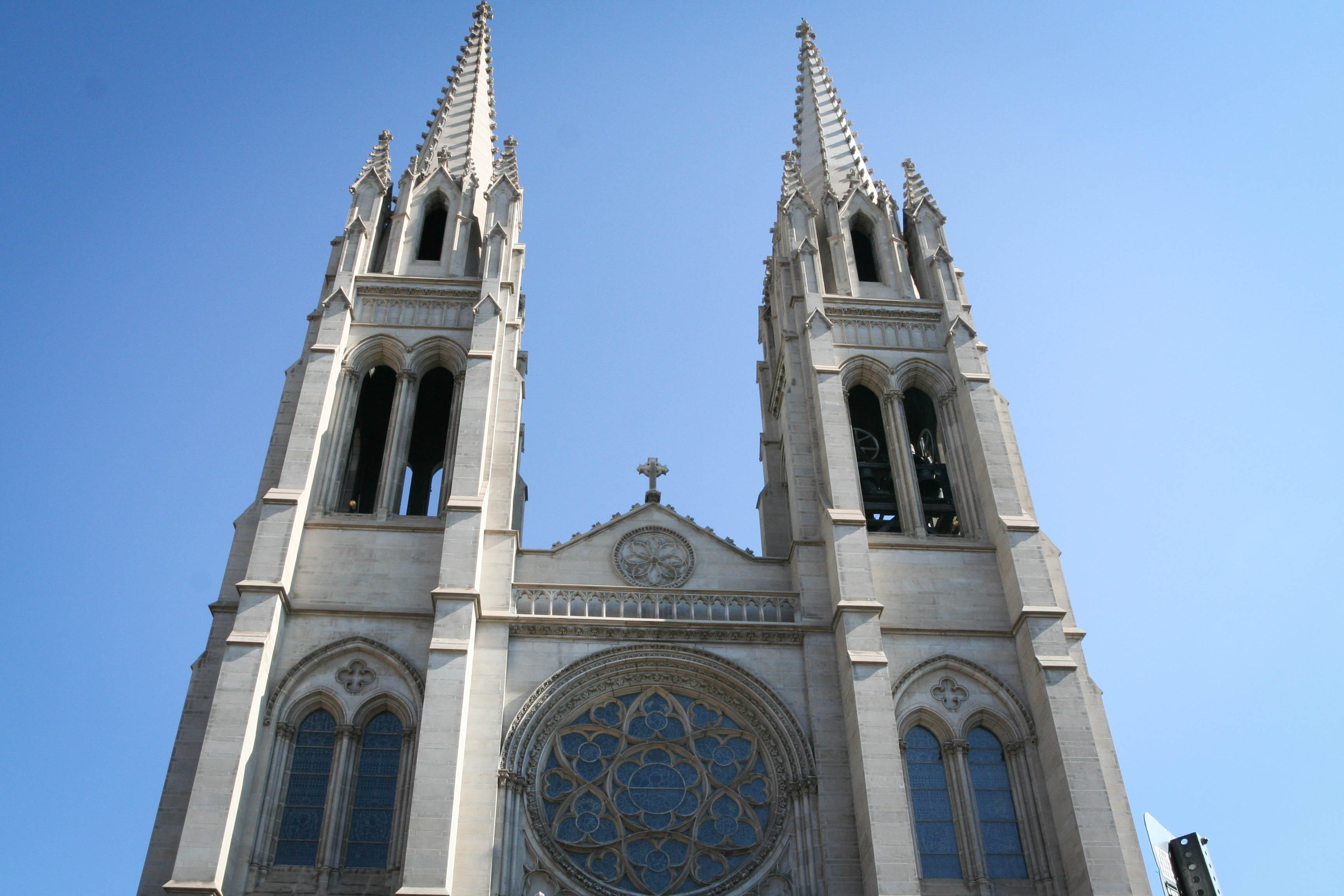
Cathedral Basilica of the Immaculate Conception, Denver, Colorado (2013)

On August 16, 1887, Matz was appointed coadjutor bishop of the Diocese of Denver and titular bishop of Telmissus by Pope Leo XIII to assist Machebeuf. He received his episcopal consecration on October 28, 1887, from Archbishop Jean-Baptiste Salpointe. Machebeuf later appointed Matz as his vicar general. From the beginning of his time as bishop in Denver, tensions arose between Matz and the Irish clergy in the diocese. Like many American clergy, they were used to more independence than that of European clergy like Matz. Machebeuf made this remark in a letter

Father Matz, although a very worthy man, may meet with some little opposition for not being an American or an Irishman, but I am confident that by his kindness, piety, prudence, and good sense he will overcome it and become very popular.

When Machebeuf died, Matz succeeded him as the second bishop of Denver on July 10, 1889. That same year, the Dominican Order arrived in Denver, at Matz's request, to staff a parish and start a school. In 1890, Matz constructed a four-story building in Denver to be used as a school and pro-cathedral for the diocese. Matz in his first pastor letter in 1892 told Catholics that it was a mortal sin to send their children to a public school if a Catholic school were available. He then began an intensive effort to recruit more religious sisters to come to Denver to start more schools.

Matz broke ground for the new Cathedral of the Immaculate Conception in 1902. However, bad investments by the rector of the pro-cathedral delayed construction. That same year, Matz persuaded Mother Frances Maria Cabrini to come to Denver and open a school to be staffed by her religious order.

In 1903, the Western Federation of Miners (WFM) began a series of strikes against the silver and gold mines in Colorado. Violence soon erupted between the striking miners and vigilantes hired by the mining companies. The Colorado National Guard had to be deployed several times to stop the violence. Equating unionization with socialism, Matz was quick to condemn the WFM;

The church stands ready now to solve the later day problem of labor. ... When labor oversteps the bounds of legitimate action, however, the church places the ban upon it. This also applies to organizations of capital combined to exercise unjust privileges.

During the early 1900's, Matz persuaded the Vincentians to come to Colorado to build their seminary in the American West. In 1906, they purchased a property in Denver and in 1908 dedicated St. Thomas Seminary.That same year, the cornerstone was finally laid for the new Cathedral of the Immaculate Conception.

In 1907, Matz became embroiled in a protracted dispute with Reverend Joseph Carrigan, the popular pastor of St. Patrick's Parish in Denver. Carrigan started constructing a new St. Patrick's Church without permission from the diocese. Matz ordered him to stop, but Carrigan continued it anyway. To compound the dispute, Carrigan in July 1907 issued a pamphlet titled "Answer to Bishop Matz". In the pamphlet, Carrigan accused Matz of theft, lying, simony among other crimes. These personal attacks reportedly dismayed many Carrigan sympathizers. As punishment for his defiance, Matz ordered Carrigan's transfer to St. Ignatius Parish in Pueblo, Colorado.

When Carrigan refused the transfer, Matz in June 1909 suspended him from public ministry in the diocese. Carrigan sued Matz in civil court, but the case was dismissed. Matz in November 1909 excommunicated Carrigan. The national press coverage of this feud prompted the apostolic delegate to the United States, Archbishop Diomede Falconio, to travel to Denver to investigate It. In a compromise, Carrigan agreed to a transfer to St. Stephen's Parish in Glenwood Springs, Colorado, and Matz rescinded the excommunication and suspension decrees.

Tensions remained high between Matz and the Irish clergy. When Matz was in Rome, a Reverend Culkin from the diocese physically confronted him. Another Denver priest, a Reverend Cushing threatened to shoot Matz. As both men were suffering from alcohol abuse and other disorders, the diocese eventually placed them in church homes for treatment.

In 1913, while sailing to Europe to visit the pope, Matz broke his kneecap onboard the ship. He spent his time in Italy hospitalized. After the outbreak of World War I in July 1914, he returned to the United States with his leg in a cast. His leg never fully recovered from the trauma. During 1915, he suffered a series of strokes. Then in October 1915 he reinjured his knee during a church service. After entering a depression, Matz's doctors persuade him to enter St. Elizabeth Hospital in Memphis, Tennessee, to recuperate. During his absence, Matz entrusted the administration of the diocese to his vicar general. Still in frail health, Matz in August 1916 requested that the Vatican appointed a coadjutor bishop to assist him.

=== Death ===
After suddenly becoming seriously ill, Matz died on August 9, 1917, at St. Anthony's Hospital in Denver at age 67. During his last hours he told a visitor, "Tell the priests that I am the enemy of none."

Catholic Church titles
| Preceded by Joseph Projectus Machebeuf | Bishop of Denver; July 10, 1889 – August 9, 1917 | Succeeded by John Henry Tihen |
