= Urban John Vehr =

20th-century American Catholic archbishop

The Most Reverend Urban John Vehr
- Archbishop of Denver
- Church: Roman Catholic
- See: Archdiocese of Denver
- Installed: November 15, 1941
- Term ended: February 18, 1967
- Predecessor: John Henry Tihen
- Successor: James Vincent Casey
- Other post: Bishop of Denver (1931–1941)

Orders
- Ordination: May 29, 1915 by Henry K. Moeller
- Consecration: June 10, 1931 by John T. McNicholas

Personal details
- Born: May 30, 1891 Cincinnati, Ohio, USA
- Died: September 19, 1973 (aged 82) Denver, Colorado, USA
- Buried: Mount Olivet Cemetery, Wheat Ridge, Colorado, USA
- Education: St. Xavier College; Mount St Mary's Seminary of the West; Catholic University of America
- Coat of arms

Urban John Vehr (May 30, 1891 – September 19, 1973) was an American prelate of the Roman Catholic Church. He served as bishop of the Diocese of Denver from 1931 to 1941. In 1941, he became the first archbishop of the new Archdiocese of Denver, serving in that post until 1967.

== Biography ==
=== Early life ===
The oldest of six children, Urban Vehr was born on May 30, 1891, in the Price Hill section of Cincinnati, Ohio, to Anthony and Catharine (née Hamann) Vehr. His father was a mechanical engineer. After graduating from St. Xavier College in Cincinnati, Urban Vehr studied theology at Mount St. Mary's Seminary of the West in the same city.

=== Priesthood ===
Vehr was ordained to the priesthood for the Archdiocese of Cincinnati by Archbishop Henry K. Moeller in Cincinnati on May 29, 1915. After his ordination, Vehr was assigned as a curate at Holy Trinity Parish in Middletown, Ohio. He was transferred in 1923 to the College of Mount St. Joseph in Cincinnati to serve as its chaplain.

In 1924, Vehr earned a Master of Education degree from the Catholic University of America in Washington, D.C. After his return to Cincinnati, he was appointed superintendent of the Catholic schools in the archdiocese. Vehr was appointed d as rector of Saint Gregory Seminary in Cincinnati in 1927 was raised to the rank of monsignor.

Vehr was sent to Rome to study at the Pontifical University of St. Thomas Aquinas, receiving a Licentiate of Canon Law in 1928. After his return from Rome, he served from 1930 to 1931, as rector of Mount St. Mary's Seminary.

=== Bishop of Denver ===
On April 17, 1931, Vehr was appointed the fourth bishop of Denver by Pope Pius XI. He received his episcopal consecration on June 10, 1931, from Archbishop John T. McNicholas, with Archbishop Francis Beckman and Bishop Joseph H. Albers serving as co-consecrators. At age 40, he was the youngest Catholic bishop in the United States. He was installed at the Cathedral of the Immaculate Conception on July 16, 1931.

Vehr soon visited every parish in the diocese, wearing out the new Studebaker automobile given to him by his clergy. The number of parishes fell from 111 in 1930 to 87 in 1940 due to the Great Depression. Vehr cooperated with the New Deal programs of US President Franklin D. Roosevelt, asking priests to celebrate mass at the two dozen Civilian Conservation Corps camps established in Colorado. He reorganized diocesan affairs and placed ownership of all parish properties in the name of the bishop.

=== Archbishop of Denver ===
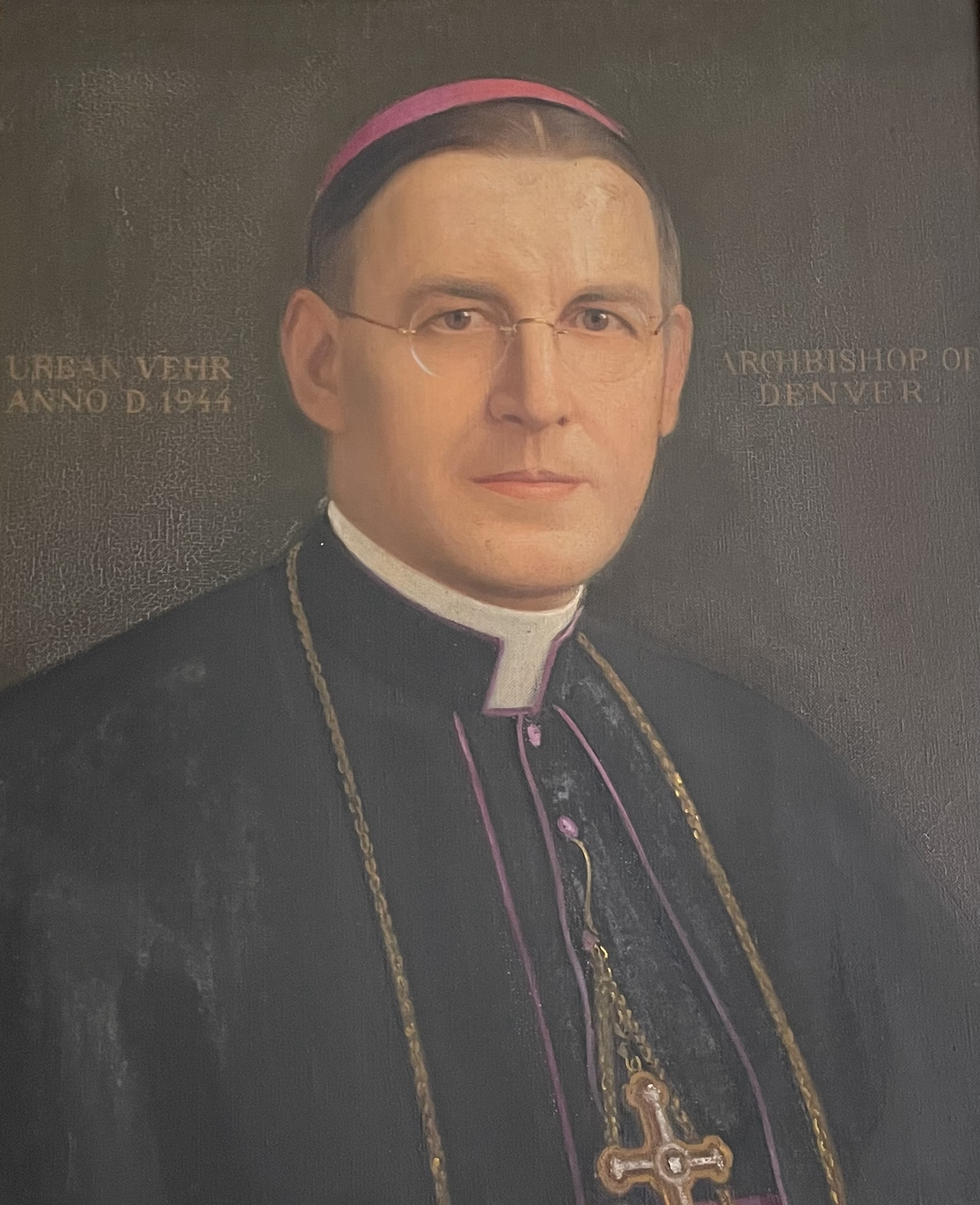
Archbishop Vehr painting

On November 15, 1941, Pope Pius XII raised the Diocese of Denver to the Archdiocese of Denver and appointed Vehr as its first archbishop. He was installed on January 6, 1942; one attendee was Monsignor Giovanni Battista Montini (the future Pope Paul VI), who stayed in Vehr's residence. Due to World War II, Vehr did not receive his pallium, a vestment worn by metropolitan bishops, until April 1946, when he received it from Cardinal Samuel Stritch.

Vehr was named as an assistant at the pontifical throne in 1955. Under the slogan of "Every Catholic Child in a Catholic School," he began a fundraising campaign to raise $3.5 million to acquire school sites and make additions to existing ones. In 1965, Vehr launched the Archdiocesan Development Program to accommodate Colorado's Catholic population, which had tripled in size since his arrival in 1931. He also erected 43 new parishes and expanded St. Thomas Seminary in Denver, which reached its peak enrollment of 274 seminarians during Vehr's tenure. Due to poor health, Vehr did not attend the Second Vatican Council sessions in Rome (1962–1965), but sent Auxiliary Bishop David Maloney instead.

=== Retirement and legacy ===
On February 18, 1967, Pope Paul VI accepted Vehr's resignation as archbishop of Denver and appointed him titular archbishop of Masuccaba. He resigned his titular see on December 31, 1970.

Urban Vehr died in Denver on September 19, 1973, at age 82.

Catholic Church titles
Preceded by John Henry Tihen	Archbishop of Denver; April 17, 1931 – February 18, 1967	Succeeded by James Vincent Casey
