= Colorado Catholic Academy =

Private school in Wheat Ridge, Colorado, US

Coordinates: 39.777828°N 105.123599°W

- Wheat Ridge, Colorado

Information
- Type: private school
- Established: 1974
- Affiliation: Roman Catholic

Colorado Catholic Academy was a private Catholic grammar school and high school in Wheat Ridge, Colorado. It was independently owned and operated with the approval of the Roman Catholic Archdiocese of Denver. Unlike most Catholic schools in the area, it was not formed by the Archdiocese of Denver and was not under the supervision of the Archdiocese's Office of Catholic Schools.

== Background ==
CCA was established in 1974 and was accredited by the National Association of Private Catholic and Independent Schools (NAPCIS).

The school's founder, Mary Ann Cristofano, was its first principal. In 1976, three of its 11 teachers were unpaid volunteers, and the school did not provide organized sports until 1977.

CCA closed due to financial constraints after the conclusion of the 2006–2007 school year.
