= Mullen High School =

Catholic high school in Colorado, US

Location
- 3601 South Lowell Boulevard; Denver, Colorado 80236; United States
- 39°39′02″N 105°02′11″W

Information
- Type: Private, Co-Educational
- Motto: Enter to Learn, Leave to Serve
- Religious affiliation: Catholic Church (Lasallian Brothers)
- Established: 1931 (95 years ago)
- CEEB code: 060600
- President: Raul Cardenas
- Principal: Sam Govea
- Staff: 160
- Faculty: 92
- Grades: 9–12
- Enrollment: 775
- Student to teacher ratio: 12:1
- Campus size: 39 acres (160,000 m^{2})
- Campus type: Urban
- Colors: Navy and gold
- Athletics conference: CHSAA
- Sports: 27
- Mascot: Mustangs
- Accreditation: COGNIA
- Tuition: $22,500
- Website: www.mullenhigh.com

Mullen High School (formerly J.K. Mullen High School) is a Catholic, Brothers of the Christian Schools, college-preparatory high school in Denver, Colorado.

== History ==
Mullen High School was named for John Kernan Mullen, businessman, philanthropist, and founder of the Colorado Milling and Elevator Company. With his wife, Catherine, Mullen envisioned founding a high school in Denver for orphaned boys. In 1928, working with Henry Tihen, Mullen contacted Edward Flanagan, the founder of Boys Town, for advice on how best to design and operate such a school. Following Flanagan's recommendation, Mullen wrote to the Christian Brothers of St. John Baptist de La Salle in Santa Fe, New Mexico, inviting them to be his planned school's directors and teachers.

In June 1928, Mullen opened negotiations with the De La Salle Christian Brothers. However, both Catherine and John Mullen died before the project could be completed, but their daughters and their husbands carried on with their plans. They purchased a 420-acre (1.7 km^{2}) plot of land on the outskirts of Denver known as the Shirley Farm Dairy. An agreement was made that would allow the dairy to remain in operation in exchange for the students’ opportunity to work in the dairy and receive training in agriculture and mechanics. On April 8, 1932, 17 boys and three brothers moved into the new J.K. Mullen Home for Boys.

Since then, Mullen High School has experienced four distinct eras of change and growth:

- 1931–1950, when the school was conducted for orphan boys only, who both attended school and worked in the dairy farm;
- 1950–1965, when paying boarders and day students joined the orphans as students, the school's farm operations ended and its name was changed to J.K. Mullen High School;
- 1966–1989, when the last of the orphans graduated, the boarding section closed, and the school became a four-year college preparatory high school for boys;
- 1989–2020, when the school became a co-educational high school and modernized its facilities and programs.
- 2020–present, Modern Era - Mullen enters into a capital improvement plan and campaign to update the facilities and buildings on campus.

== Extracurricular activities ==
=== Athletics ===
==== State championships ====
State Championships
Season	Sport	Year
Fall	Football	1978, 1979, 1980, 1998, 2004, 2008, 2009, 2010
Fall	Soccer, Boys	2011, 2025
Fall	Softball, Girls	2001
Fall	Cross Country, Boys	1999
Fall	Cross Country, Girls	1994, 1996, 1997, 1998, 1999
Winter	Swimming, Boys	2003, 2011
Winter	Swimming, Girls	1996, 1997, 1998, 2001, 2003, 2004, 2005
Winter	Basketball, Boys	2001, 2006
Winter	Basketball, Girls	2000, 2001, 2002, 2006, 2019, 2020, 2021, 2022, 2025
Spring	Golf, Boys	1984, 1995, 1996, 1998, 2000, 2001, 2002
Spring	Golf, Girls	2001, 2002, 2003, 2004, 2005
Spring	Tennis, Girls	2001, 2006
Spring	Track and Field, Boys	1968, 1994, 1996, 1997, 1998, 1999, 2001, 2002, 2003, 2004, 2005, 2009
Spring	Track and Field, Girls	1997, 1998, 1999, 2000, 2001, 2002, 2003, 2005, 2006, 2007, 2011
Spring	Baseball	1978, 1985

== Notable alumni ==
- Chester Burnett (American football), NFL linebacker
- Jim Deidel, MLB player
- Sam Haggerty, MLB player
- Maverick Handley, MLB player
- Ryan Hewitt, NFL football player
- Mark Holzemer, MLB pitcher
- Frank McNulty, Colorado legislator, former Speaker of the House (Colorado House of Representatives)
- David Tate (American football), NFL safety, Chicago Bears
- Bo Scaife, NFL football player
- J. K. Scott, NFL Punter, Los Angeles Chargers
- Alex Smith (tight end), NFL tight end
- Scott Wedman, basketball player
- Brendan Winters, basketball player

== Notes and references ==
7. Mullen High School Alumni, The Baseball Cube. http://www.thebaseballcube.com/hs/profile.asp?ID=427
