= John Kernan Mullen =

Irish-American businessman, philanthropist

- Born: June 11, 1847; Ballinasloe, County Galway, Ireland
- Died: August 9, 1929 (aged 82); Denver, Colorado
- Occupations: Miller, rancher, and real estate investor

John Kernan Mullen (June 11, 1847 – August 9, 1929) was an Irish-American businessman and philanthropist. Mullen came to the United States at the age of nine and left school at fourteen to work in a mill, an occupation that he continued throughout the east, Kansas, and Colorado. He introduced the Hungarian milling process in Colorado and owned and operated several mills. He was also a rancher and real estate investor.

Mullen was twice knighted by the Pope, first as a Knight of the Order of St Gregory and later as a Knight of the Order of Malta, for his philanthropic activities for the Catholic Church. Mullen donated to the construction of school buildings, churches, and a home for the elderly.

== Early life and emigration ==
Mullen was born on June 11, 1847 in Ballinasloe, County Galway, Ireland, during the Great Famine. His parents were Denis Mullen (1806–1886) and Ellen Mulray (1816–1888). John had an older brother Patrick (born 1844), as well as younger siblings Ella (born 1849), Denis (born 1850), Kate (born 1853) and another who did not survive.

During the 1820s and 1830s, John's father Denis and uncle Thomas Mullen, "crafted barrels for the mills" of Ballinasloe, which had three oatmeal mills, two breweries, and a flour mill.

The Mullen family left Ireland during the Irish Potato Famine, also called the Great Famine. They were among a wave of 1.2 million refugees who emigrated to the United States during the nine-year period from the year of Mullen's birth until 1856, when the family emigrated to the United States. The Mullens settled at Oriskany Falls, Oneida County, New York, where Denis and Thomas purchased houses adjacent to each other, and close to the town mill.

John Mullen dropped out of school and worked at age fourteen at the Oriskany Flour Mill. By the age of twenty he managed the mill.

== Businessman ==
Mullen headed west in 1867 looking for positions as a miller. He spent time in Illinois and Atchison, Kansas. He settled in Troy, Kansas, where he was in charge of the Banner Flour Mills, owned by Tracey and Parker Company. In the fall of 1871, Mullen left for Denver, where he worked at West Denver Flour Mill, owned by O. W Shackleton and Charles Davis.

In 1875, Mullen decided to operate his own mill. Mullen leased the old Star Mill in north Denver as a partnership with Theodore Seth. He bought his partner out and the company became J.K. Mullen and Company. Catherine operated a boarding house for their mill workers. During the following years, Mullen took over the Sigler Mill, Excelsior Mill, and Iron Clad Mill. In 1882, he established the Hungarian Mill. Mullen's brother Patrick was the exclusive supplier of flour barrels to Mullen's mills.

Among his contributions to the Colorado milling industry were his introduction of the Hungarian milling process (alternative to gristmill) and high-altitude flour. In 1885, Mullen established the Colorado Milling and Elevator Company (CM&E), where he was the general manager. The organization was formed as a trust to help stabilize unpredictable flour prices; area millers elected Mullen as general manager, thereby increasing Mullen's industry influence.

In addition to milling, Mullen was involved in the land and cattle business, including the J.K. Mullen Land and Cattle Company (located in Lamar), Riverside Land and Cattle Company (Larimer County), and the Platte Land and Cattle Company (Logan County).

Over time, Mullen entered the financial sector, first as president of Union Savings and Loan Association, later a director at the First National Bank of Denver. Mullen also served on Council of Defense, a body organized by Colorado governor Julius Caldeen Gunter in 1917 to prepare for recruitment and property defense after the U.S. entry into World War I.

== Personal life and philanthropy ==
On October 12, 1874, Mullen married Catherine Smith with whom they had four girls, Katherine, May, Ella, and Edith. They also had a daughter Anne who died at the age of four.

He became known as a philanthropist because of his numerous donations of land and significant funds for construction of:

- The J.K. Mullen Memorial Library at The Catholic University of America in Washington D.C. and a fund to provide ten annual scholarships for Colorado men to the university
- The Little Sisters of the Poor Home for the Aged in Denver
- St. Mary's Academy of Leavenworth, Kansas
- St. Cajetan's Catholic Church, a large Hispanic parish
- Immaculate Conception Cathedral

Mullen established the John K. and Catherine S. Mullen Benevolent Corporation in 1924. Mullen and Catherine founded a school for orphaned boys that was run and taught by the Christian Brothers of St. John Baptist de La Salle in Santa Fe, New Mexico. The school was not completed by the time of the couple's death. Completed in the 1930s by their daughters, the school is now the J. K. Mullen High School.

== Death ==
Mullen died of pneumonia on August 9, 1929, aged 82, with an estimated net worth of $4 million. He was the first person to lie in state at Denver's Cathedral of the Immaculate Conception. Mullen was buried in the Mullen family mausoleum at Mount Olivet Cemetery in Wheat Ridge, Colorado. His wife, who died on March 23, 1925, and daughters were also buried at Mount Olivet Cemetery.

== Honors ==
In recognition of Mullen's efforts on behalf of the Catholic Church, the Pope twice knighted him, first as a Knight of the Order of St Gregory and later as a Knight of the Order of Malta.

== Sources ==
- Convery, William J. III (2000). Pride of the Rockies: The Life of Colorado's Premiere Irish Patron, John Kernan Mullen. University of Colorado. ISBN 0-87081-591-1..
