= Bishop Machebeuf High School =

Location
- 458 Uinta Way; Denver, Colorado 80230; United States
- Coordinates: 39°43′28″N 104°53′27″W

Information
- School type: Private Catholic school
- Religious affiliation: Roman Catholicism
- Established: 1958
- Founder: Moisinger Campbell
- Educational authority: Archdiocese of Denver
- CEEB code: 060419
- NCES School ID: 00208075
- Interim Principal: Ralph Pesce
- Teaching staff: 24.3 (on an FTE basis)
- Grades: 9–12
- Enrollment: 200 (2021–22)
- Student to teacher ratio: 8.2
- Colors: Green and gold
- Athletics conference: Mile High
- Mascot: Buffalo
- Accreditation: National Catholic Educational Association
- Annual tuition: $16,100
- Website: machebeuf.org

Bishop Machebeuf High School was an Archdiocesan school under the Roman Catholic Archdiocese of Denver, in Denver, Colorado.

== Background ==
Founded in 1958 as "Bishop Machebeuf Catholic High School", it was named after Bishop Joseph Projectus Machebeuf, Denver's first bishop. It was a co-ed college preparatory high school located in Lowry, Colorado.

== The Lowry Location ==
In January 2000, Bishop Machebeuf High School moved from its historic old location in Denver's Park Hill neighborhood to Lowry. The new location includes a gym, drama room and stage, cafeteria with microwaves for student use, a kitchen, athletic fields, a courtyard in the center of the academic wing, athletic fields, 17 1,100 square foot classrooms, and a center for counseling and academic resources, all things that were not present at the old location.

The school closed permanently in 2025.

== Integrated Humanities ==
In 2017, Bishop Machebeuf added a Classical track which is a class designed to teach students using classic materials such as Plato, Socrates, Aristotle, St. Augustine, etc. In 2020, all students began taking this track which includes at least two years of Latin, a three year Trivium sequence of Grammar, Logic, and Rhetoric, and an Integrated Humanities Seminar. This seminar combines history, literature, and philosophy taught in a Socratic Seminar. Students also take four years of Theology as well as four years on Mathematics and Science.

== Campus Ministry ==
Three Divisions of Campus Ministry The Campus Ministry program used to have three major divisions. Each division had a student director that coordinated the particular part of the program with the Campus Minister.

Liturgy The liturgy division provides liturgical experiences for the entire student body. This primarily refers to the All School Liturgy which happens on a weekly basis. The liturgy division also assists the organization of First Friday Adoration days and triannual confession services. Finally, the liturgy division organizes All School prayer at BMHS including but not limited to: Opening and Closing of the school prayer and special prayer services during the liturgical seasons.

Evangelization The evangelization division assists the organization of outreach events for the students of BMHS as well as the larger community. Events include: Christian concerts, mission trips, service projects, pilgrimages, and special community masses (St. Nick's mass, Mother – Son Mass etc.).

Media The media division of Campus Ministry provides support for all aspects of Campus Ministry. The media division produces resources for the web, print, and multimedia presentations. Photos of all CM are collected and stored by the media division. Press and news releases are published by the media division as well.

== Athletics ==
The girls' basketball team won the 3A state championship in 2003 and 2007.

In 2005, Bishop Machebeuf won the boys' baseball state championship in Class 3A, defeating state powerhouse Eaton in the semifinals and Roosevelt in the championship game.

Recently, all Machebeuf athletics switched to 2A.

== Championship Team Rosters ==
Baseball - 2005 Tyler Hensen C, Danny Young C, Dominic Paolucci 3B, Jordan Johnson SS/P, Nick Cafasso P/OF, Logan Roberts OF, Greg Schaer P/OF, Daniel Sheley P/OF, Dave Kathmann P/OF, David Machado 1B, Matt McIntyre OF, Josh Cox P/OF, Richie Parkhill SS, Mike Lopez 2B, Devon Tenario OF.
