= Albert T. Frantz =

American judge (1903–1985)

Albert Theobald Frantz (Note: The spelling of Frantz's middle name is uncertain. He spelled and signed it as Theobald on his World War II draft registration card. It was spelled as Thibault in his Marquis Who's Who entry, and his former law partners spelled it as Thibeau in their 1996 tribute.) (December 9, 1903 – 1985) was an associate justice of the Colorado Supreme Court from 1957 to 1967.

== Early life, education, and career ==
Born in Denver, Colorado, Frantz grew up nearby in Longmont, and attended Cathedral High School. He received an undergraduate degree from Regis University, and then received an LL.B. from the University of Notre Dame in 1929. After initially entering the practice of law in South Bend, Indiana and serving as secretary of the South Bend Bar Association in 1933, he moved back to Denver to practice in 1936.

== Judicial and post-judicial service ==
Frantz won election to the Denver District Court in 1952, becoming the presiding judge, and in 1956 was elected as a Democratic candidate for the Colorado Supreme Court. Frantz and Edward Day, elected at the same time, were the first two Catholics to serve on the state supreme court. Two of his major decisions were Weiss v. Axler and Carpenter v. Donohue. In the former, he found that the doctrine of res ipsa loquitur created a presumption of negligence that a defendant must overcome, and in the latter he found that buyers of newly constructed homes have a right to expect that their home was constructed in a "workman like fashion" and that it would be "suitable for habitation," creating an implied warranty for the homebuyer. He was selected by his peers to serve as chief justice for 1963, and he lost re-election to the court in 1966. Frantz served until January 10, 1967, although he continued to produce opinions pursuant to an amendment to the state constitution passed during his tenure that allowed former judges to continue assisting with the work of the court.

Following the end of his service on the supreme court, Frantz continued to engage in public service. In 1969, Frantz served as a hearing officer in expulsion proceedings brought by the University of Colorado against members of Students for a Democratic Society. In February 1973, he presided over an Adams County Court case in which two police officers pled guilty to beating a double-amputee, and in 1974 he presided over a hearing on the environmental impact of proposed coal-fired generators in Craig, Colorado. In 1976, he swore into office the governor of the "Colorado Columbine Girls State", an American Legion-sponsored program. Frantz was active in community and civic service, serving on the boards of the Colorado Bar Association, Multiple Sclerosis Society of Colorado, Goodwill Industries of Colorado, Colorado Optometric Center, Urban League of Colorado, and Exchange Club of Denver.

== Personal life and death ==
In 1929, Frantz married Dorothy Spry, and they would have three children.

Frantz died in 1985 at age 81, and was interred in Mount Olivet Cemetery.

== Notes ==
Political offices
| Preceded by Henry S. Lindsley | Justice of the Colorado Supreme Court; 1957–1967 | Succeeded by Paul V. Hodges |
