= Brendan Winters =

American former basketball player (born 1983)

Personal information
- Born: May 9, 1983 (age 43) Denver, Colorado, U.S.
- Listed height: 6 ft 5 in (1.96 m)
- Listed weight: 205 lb (93 kg)

Career information
- High school: Mullen (Denver, Colorado); Worcester Academy (Worcester, Massachusetts)
- College: Davidson (2002–2006)
- NBA draft: 2006: undrafted
- Playing career: 2006–2011
- Position: Shooting guard

Career history
- 2006–2007: Nantes
- 2007–2010: Bayer Giants Leverkusen
- 2010–2011: Atomerőmű SE
- 2011: Aris

Career highlights
- BBL All-Star (2010); AP Honorable Mention All-American (2005); SoCon Player of the Year (2005); 3× First-team All-SoCon (2004–2006)

Brendan Winters (born May 9, 1983) is an American former basketball player. He is best known for his All-American college career at Davidson College. He is also the son of former National Basketball Association (NBA) player and coach Brian Winters.

Winters led Mullen High School in Denver, Colorado, to a 5A state championship in 2001. After receiving no Division I college scholarship offers, he opted to attend a year of prep school at Worcester Academy. He was recruited by coach Bob McKillop after his prep school year.

At Davidson, Winters became a four-year starter and one of the top players in the Southern Conference (SoCon). He averaged 12.4 points per game as a freshman in 2002–03, then raised his average to 17.8 as a sophomore. In that sophomore season, Winters was named to the All-Southern Conference team. Winters' junior season was a special one for both him and the Davidson Wildcats. The team went a perfect 16–0 in the SoCon and Winters was named conference player of the year by both the conference media and coaches. As a senior, Winters and Davidson were not able to replicate their perfect season of the year before, but they earned a bid to the 2006 NCAA Tournament by winning the SoCon Tournament, with Winters winning MVP honors.

Following the end of his college career, Winters went undrafted in the 2006 NBA draft. He went to France to play for Nantes of the LNB Pro B, averaging 15.4 points per game for the season. He then spent the next three seasons in Germany with Bayer Giants Leverkusen, and was named a Bundesliga All-Star in 2010. Winters split the 2010–11 season between Atomerőmű SE in Hungary and Aris B.C. in Greece.

Following his professional basketball career, Winters returned to the United States to help found a youth basketball organization.
