= Jim Deidel =

American baseball player (born 1949)

- Catcher
- Born: June 6, 1949 (age 77); Denver, Colorado, U.S.
- Batted: Right Threw: Right

MLB debut
- May 31, 1974, for the New York Yankees

Last MLB appearance
- June 5, 1974, for the New York Yankees

MLB statistics
- Games played: 2
- At bats: 2
- Hits: 0
- Stats at Baseball Reference

Teams
- New York Yankees (1974)

James Lawrence Deidel (born June 6, 1949) is an American former Major League Baseball catcher. He bats and throws right-handed.

Deidel was drafted by the New York Yankees in the 15th round (126th overall) of the 1967 Major League Baseball draft. He played only in 1974 with the Yankees. He had two at-bats, in two games, going 0–2.

Deidel attended Mullen High School in Denver where he lettered in several sports and Colorado State University in Fort Collins. He had football scholarship offers to several major college programs as a quarterback but opted to accept the Yankees' signing bonus and pursue a professional baseball career instead.

In addition to his brief stint with the Yankees as a backup catcher to Thurman Munson, Deidel played nine years in the Yankees' farm system including seasons at Johnson City, Tennessee, Oneonta, New York, Kinston, NC, and West Haven, CT. He ended his career in the mid-1970s after several seasons in the AAA International League at Syracuse, New York. He played under manager Bobby Cox at West Haven and Syracuse.
