= Munster, Moselle =

Munster
- Commune
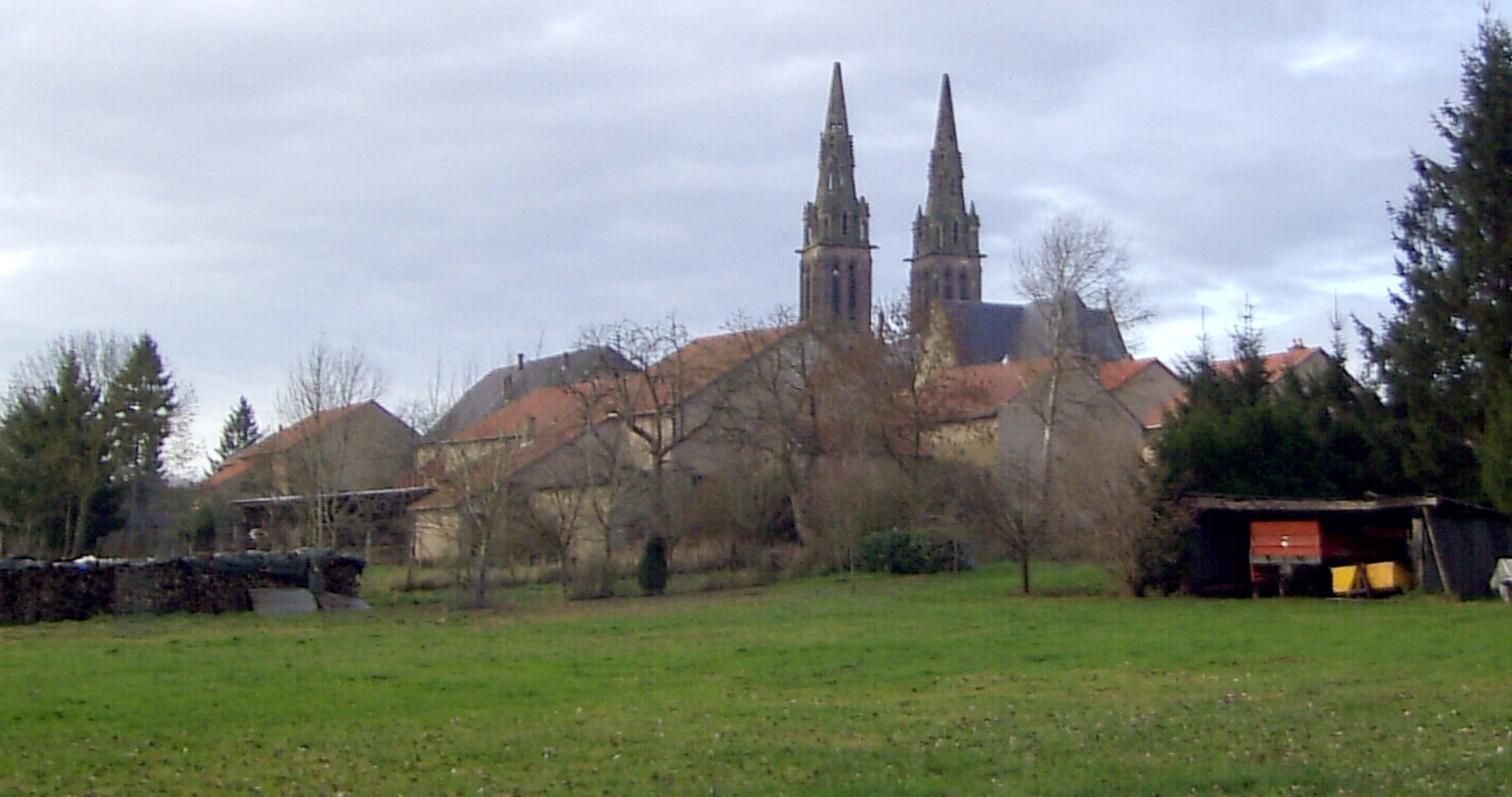
- A general view of Munster

- Coat of arms
- Location of Munster
- Location within France Location within Grand Est
- Coordinates: 48°54′58″N 6°54′24″E
- Country: France
- Region: Grand Est
- Department: Moselle
- Arrondissement: Sarrebourg-Château-Salins
- Canton: Le Saulnois
- Intercommunality: CC Saulnois

Government
  - Mayor (2020–2026): Gérard Manns
- Area^{1}: 6.6 km^{2} (2.5 sq mi)
- Elevation: 235 m (771 ft)
- Highest elevation: 248 m (814 ft)
- Lowest elevation: 217 m (712 ft)
- Population (2023): 237
  - Density: 36/km^{2} (93/sq mi)
- Time zone: UTC+01:00 (CET)
  - Summer (DST): UTC+02:00 (CEST)
- INSEE/Postal code: 57494 /57670
- ^{1} French Land Register data, which excludes lakes, ponds, glaciers > 1 km^{2} (0.386 sq mi or 247 acres) and river estuaries.

Munster (French pronunciation: [mœ̃stɛʁ]; German: Münster; Lorraine Franconian: Minschder) is a commune in the Moselle department in Grand Est in north-eastern France.

== Demographics ==
Historical population
Year	Pop.	±% p.a.
1968	238	—
1975	227	−0.67%
1982	243	+0.98%
1990	230	−0.68%
1999	197	−1.71%
2007	212	+0.92%
2012	230	+1.64%
2017	249	+1.60%
2023	237	−0.82%
Source: INSEE

== Architecture ==
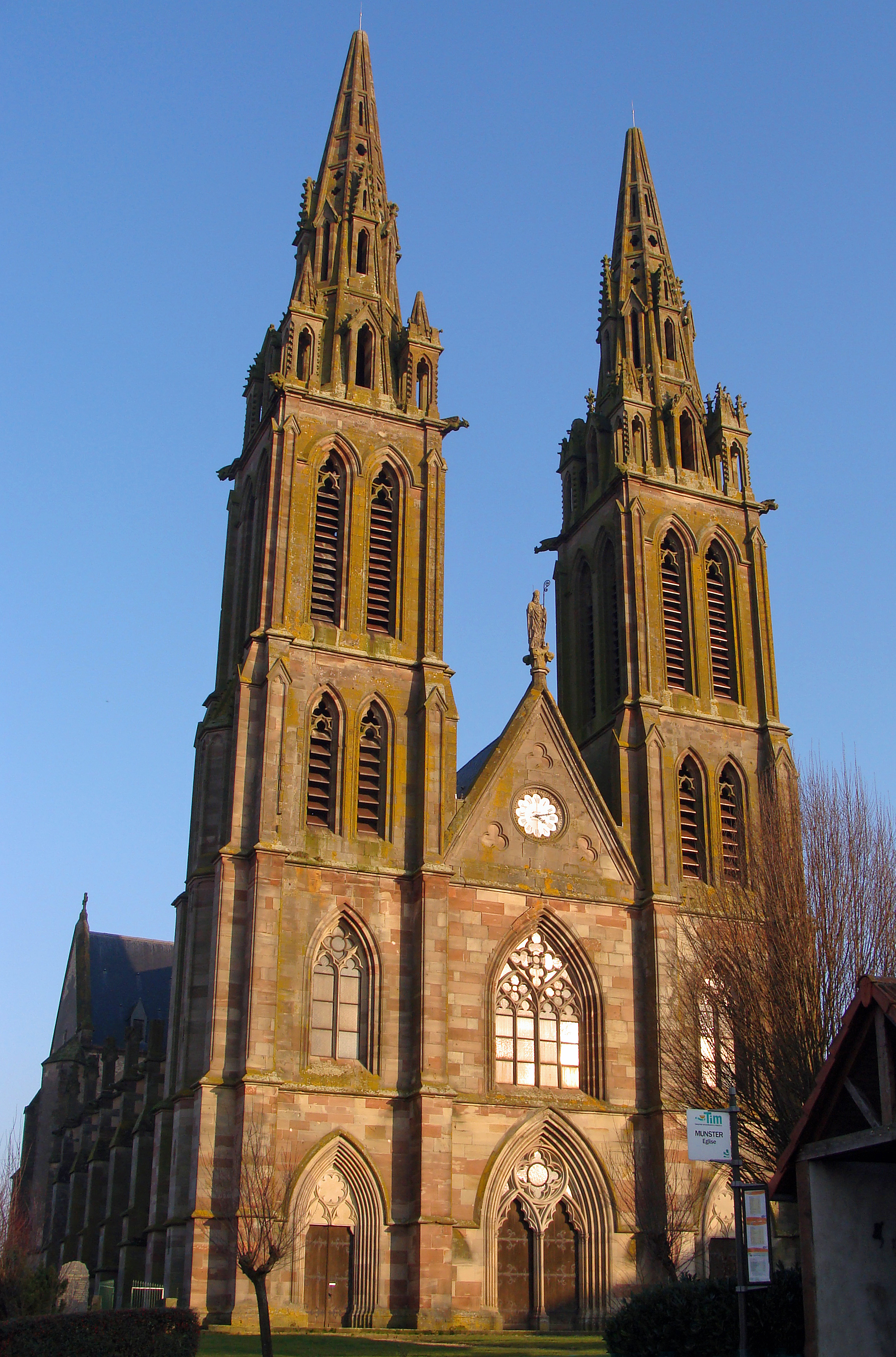
Saint Nicholas church

Notable buildings include the 13th-century Saint Nicholas Collegiate Roman Catholic church (collégiale Saint-Nicolas). Some of the church's features were replicated in the Cathedral Basilica of the Immaculate Conception in Denver, Colorado.

== See also ==
- Communes of the Moselle department
- Parc naturel régional de Lorraine
