= Archdiocese of Denver =

Latin Catholic jurisdiction in the US

Coordinates: 39°41′36″N 104°56′53″W

Archdiocese of Denver Archidiœcesis Denveriensis
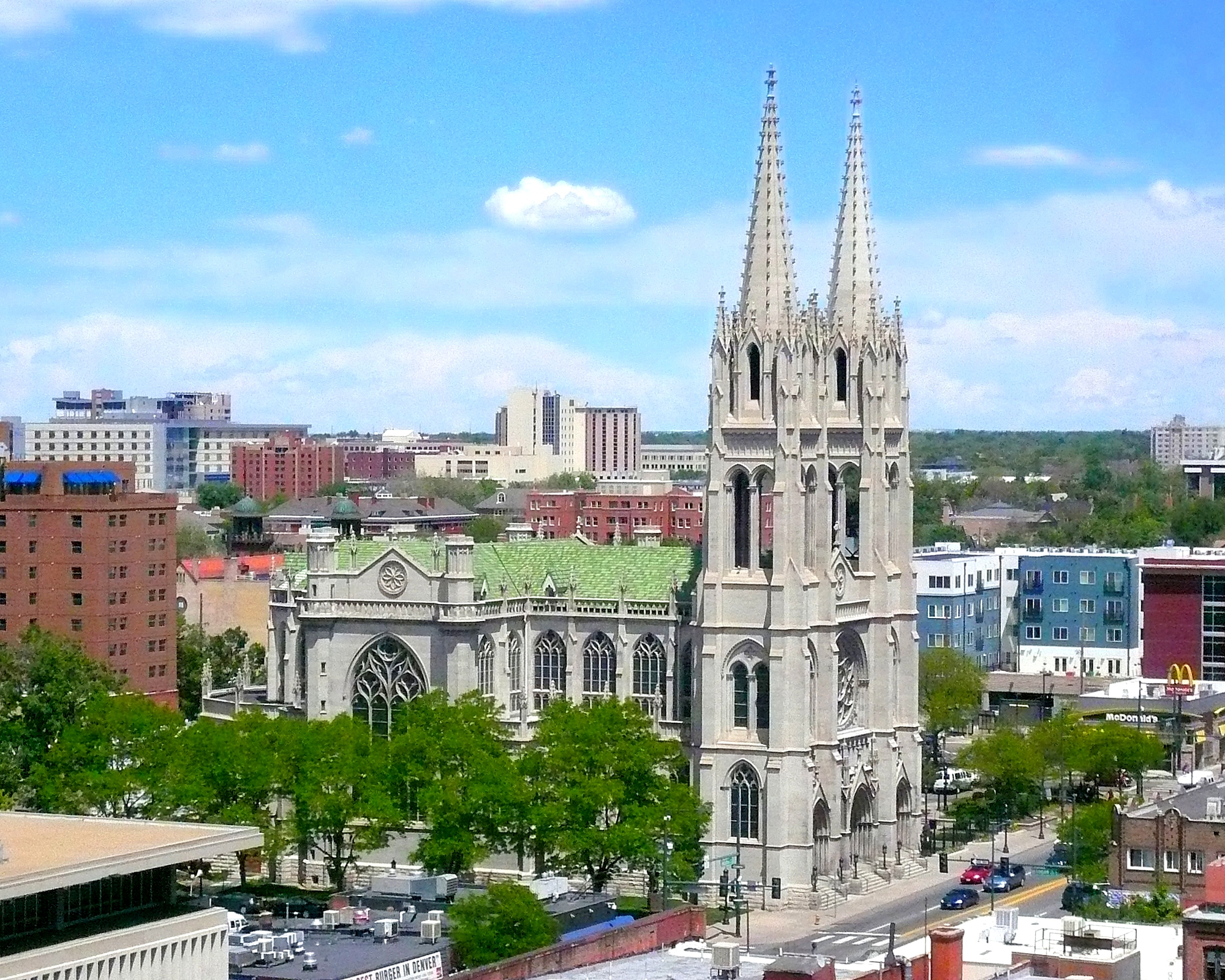
- Cathedral Basilica of the Immaculate Conception

- Coat of arms

Location
- Country: United States
- Territory: Northern Colorado
- Ecclesiastical province: Denver
- Population: 550,000 (17.1%)

Information
- Denomination: Catholic
- Sui iuris church: Latin Church
- Rite: Roman Rite
- Established: August 16, 1887; 139 years ago
- Cathedral: Cathedral Basilica of the Immaculate Conception
- Patron saint: Immaculate Conception; St. Francis of Assisi

Current leadership
- Pope: Leo XIV
- Archbishop: James R. Golka
- Auxiliary Bishops: Jorge Rodríguez-Novelo
- Vicar General: Randy Dollins
- Bishops emeritus: James Stafford; Samuel J. Aquila

Map
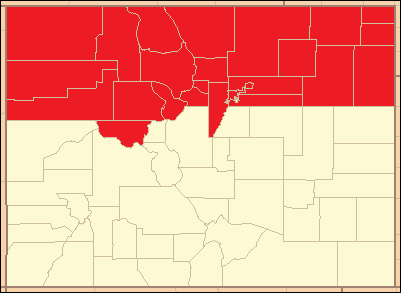

Website
- archden.org

The Archdiocese of Denver (Latin: Archidiœcesis Metropolitae Denveriensis) is a Latin Church ecclesiastical jurisdiction, or diocese, of the Catholic Church in northern Colorado in the United States. It is part of the XIII Conference Region and includes 113 parishes, 307 priests, and an estimated 550,000 lay Catholics. The mother church of the metropolitan archdiocese is the Cathedral Basilica of the Immaculate Conception in Denver. Since March 2026, the metropolitan archbishop of Denver has been James R. Golka.

== Area ==
The Archdiocese of Denver covers an area of 40,154 square miles (104,000 km^{2}). It includes the city/county of Denver and the following counties:

Adams, Arapahoe, Boulder, Broomfield, Clear Creek, Eagle, Garfield, Gilpin, Grand, Jackson, Jefferson, Larimer, Logan, Moffat, Morgan, Phillips, Pitkin, Rio Blanco, Routt, Sedgwick, Summit, Washington, Weld, and Yuma.

It is the metropolitan archdiocese of its ecclesiastical province. The province includes three suffragan dioceses:

- Diocese of Cheyenne
- Diocese of Colorado Springs
- Diocese of Pueblo

== History ==
=== 1860 to 1890 ===
The first Catholic church in Denver was founded in 1860 by Joseph Machebeuf. It would later become St. Mary's Cathedral. iN 1864, three members of the Sisters of Loretto arrived in Denver; that same year, they opened St. Mary’s Academy, the first Catholic school in the city.

In 1868, Pope Pius IX erected the Vicariate Apostolic of Colorado and Utah, taking its territory from the Diocese of Santa Fe and the Diocese of Grass Valley. The pope named Machebeuf as the vicar apostolic. In 1870, Pius IX removed the Utah Territory from the vicariate, creating the Vicariate Apostolic of Colorado. The pope named Machebeuf as vicar apostolic. In 1873, the Sisters of Charity of Leavenworth opened Saint Joseph Hospital in Denver. That same year, Sacred Heart of Mercy Parish was erected in Boulder, the first parish in that city.

While vicar apostolic, Machebeuf founded an academy and a school for boys in Denver, a convent of the Sisters of Loretto and the Home of the Good Shepherd for orphaned girls. The Catholic population of Colorado increased under his tenure from a few thousand to approximately 50,000. Sacred Heart of Jesus, the first Catholic church in Boulder, was dedicated in 1877. That same year, the Society of Jesus opened the College of the Sacred Heart in Denver. It is today Regis University. In 1878, Frank Michaud funded the purchase of a wooden building in Fort Collins to become St. Joseph's, the first Catholic church in that city.St. Mary Parish in Aspen was erected in 1881, making it the first Catholic parish there.

On August 16, 1887, Pope Leo XIII suppressed the Apostolic Vicariate of Colorado, replacing it with the Diocese of Denver, which covered all of Colorado. The pope named Machebeuf as the first bishop of Denver. That same year, the pope named Nicholas Matz as coadjutor bishop to assist Machebeuf. When Machebeuf died in 1889, Matz automatically succeeded him as bishop.

=== 1900 to 1941 ===
The first parish in Steamboat Springs, Holy Name, was erected in 1900.

Bishop Tihan (1930)

During his 28-year-long tenure, Matz made Catholic education his top priority, establishing dozens of parochial schools. He demanded that Catholic parents send their children to these schools under pain of mortal sin. In 1905, he founded St. Thomas Seminary in Denver, staffed by the Vincentians. He broke ground for the new Cathedral of the Immaculate Conception in 1902, later dedicating it in 1912. He also established thirty-four new parishes, a cemetery, and a diocesan newspaper. However, Matz met opposition from many priests and his ambitious building projects drove the diocese into a large amount of debt. He was a strong opponent of labor unions, especially the Western Federation of Miners.

After Matz died in 1917, Bishop John Henry Tihen of the Diocese of Lincoln was appointed bishop of Denver by Pope Benedict XV. After the American entry into World War I in 1917, Tihen supported Liberty bonds and the National Catholic War Council. He also organized students at Catholic schools as the U.S. Boys Working Reserve and the Children's Red Cross Campaign. Tihen was forced to defend the Catholic church in Colorado from the Ku Klux Klan, which he condemned as "an anti-Catholic and un-American society." He also supported women's suffrage and the labor movement, and founded The Denver Catholic Register in 1905. The first parish in Arvada, the Shrine of St. Anne, was erected in 1920.

During his tenure, Tihen organized the diocesan Catholic Charities; increased the number of parochial schools from 31 to 49, and the number of priests from 174 to 229; dedicated 41 churches; and established Loretto Heights College in Denver, three hospitals, an orphanage, and a home for the elderly. Tihan retired in 1931.

In 1931, Monsignor Urban John Vehr from the Archdiocese of Cincinnati was appointed the fourth bishop of Denver by Pope Pius XI. Vehr soon visited every parish in the diocese, wearing out the new Studebaker automobile given to him by his clergy. The number of parishes in the diocese fell from 111 in 1930 to 87 in 1940 due to the economic effects of the Great Depression. Vehr cooperated with the New Deal programs of President Franklin D. Roosevelt, asking priests to celebrate mass at the two dozen Civilian Conservation Corps camps established in Colorado. He reorganized diocesan affairs and placed ownership of all parish properties in the name of the bishop.

=== 1941 to 1986 ===
Archbishop Vehr (1965)

On November 15, 1941, Pope Pius XII elevated the Diocese of Denver to the Archdiocese of Denver. At the same time, he took territory from the Diocese of Denver to erect the new Diocese of Pueblo. The pope named Vehr as the first archbishop of Denver. Under the slogan of "Every Catholic Child in a Catholic School," Vehr began a fundraising campaign to raise $3.5 million to acquire new school sites and make additions to existing ones.

In 1947, St. Bernadette Parish was established in Lakewood, the first in that city. The first parish in Aurora, St. Pius, was erected in 1954.

In 1965, Vehr launched the Archdiocesan Development Program to accommodate Colorado's Catholic population, which had tripled in size since his arrival in 1931. He also erected 43 new parishes and expanded St. Thomas Seminary, which reached its peak enrollment of 274 seminarians during Vehr's tenure.

When Vehr retired in 1967, Pope Paul VI appointed Bishop James Casey of Lincoln as the second archbishop of Denver. Soon after arriving in Denver, he earmarked $1 million in archdiocesan funds on efforts to help the poor. Among these efforts was the Samaritan House Homeless Shelter. He created the archdiocesan Office of Hispanic Concerns in 1968, later raising it to the vicariate level in 1981.

In 1972, Casey moved out of the episcopal mansion in Cheesman Park and into a penthouse at the Park Lane Apartments in Washington Park. He gave greater power to laity and nuns, and was forced to close or consolidate several Catholic schools. He joined the Colorado Council of Churches, and allowed Catholics to participate in the crusades of the evangelist Billy Graham. During his 19-year-long tenure, Casey dedicated 24 parishes. He also increased the number of priests from 327 to 356, and the number of Catholics in the archdiocese rose from 261,844 to 330,270. In 1983, Pope John Paul II erected the Diocese of Colorado Springs, taking territory from the archdiocese. Casey died in 1986.

=== 1986 to present ===
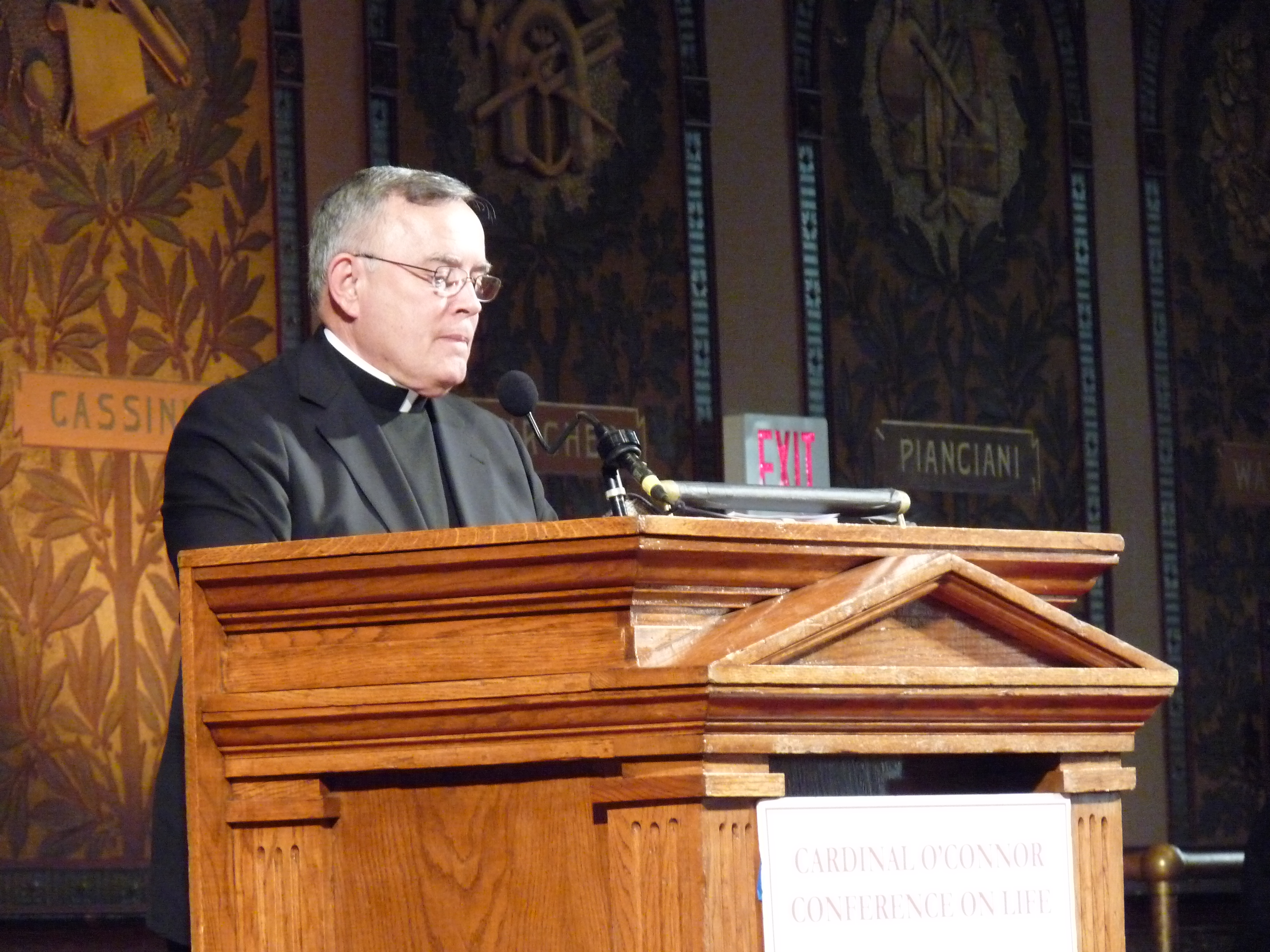
Archbishop Chaput (2011)

The next archbishop of Denver was Bishop James Stafford from the Diocese of Memphis, named by John Paul II in 1986. In 1990 the Vincentian Fathers announced the closing of St. Thomas Seminary in Denver due to falling enrollment. Stafford decided to buy the seminary property and plan a brand new institution, Saint John Vianney Theological Seminary. The new facility opened in 1999. In 1993, Stafford hosted the World Youth Day, the first such event in North America. In 1996, he launched the first capital campaign in forty years and a "Strategic Plan" for Catholic schools. That same year, Stafford was appointed to a position in the Roman Curia at the Vatican.

To replace Stafford, John Paul II selected Bishop Charles J. Chaput from the Diocese of Rapid City as the next archbishop of Denver. Chaput became archbishop of the Archdiocese of Philadelphia in 2011. In 2012, Pope Benedict XVI named Bishop Samuel Aquila of the Diocese of Fargo as the fifth archbishop of Denver, serving until 2026.

=== Reports of sex abuse ===
In a 2005 Denver Post article, five men described being fondled during the 1960s when they were boys by Harold White. In 1983, one of the men wrote to Stafford, accusing White of abusing him. The archdiocese allowed White to work in parish ministry until 1993. He was laicized in 2004.

Tim Evans, pastor at St. Elizabeth Ann Seton Parish in Fort Collins, was convicted of sexual assault in 2007. He was sentenced to 14 years to life in prison for assaulting a teenage boy.

In October 2019, Colorado Attorney General Phil Weiser released the preliminary results of an eight-month investigation on sexual abuse of children by Catholic clergy in Colorado. The report stated that at least 127 children had been molested by 22 clergy serving in the archdiocese.

In October 2020, a voluntary program established by the Colorado dioceses to compensative sexual abuse victims announced that it was planning to $6.6 million in compensation to 81 victims of clergy sex abuse.

In December 2020, Weiser's final report was released. It named an additional nine clergy with credible accusations of sexual abuse and 46 alleged victims in both in the archdiocese and the Diocese of Pueblo. A total 52 priests who served in the Colorado diocese were named in the final report as having committed acts of sex abuse. Among the priests were Harold White, whom the report called "the most prolific known clergy child sex abuser in Colorado history." John Stein was arrested for sex abuse charges in 1946 and 1956 but continued in ministry, molesting at least three children.

== Bishops ==
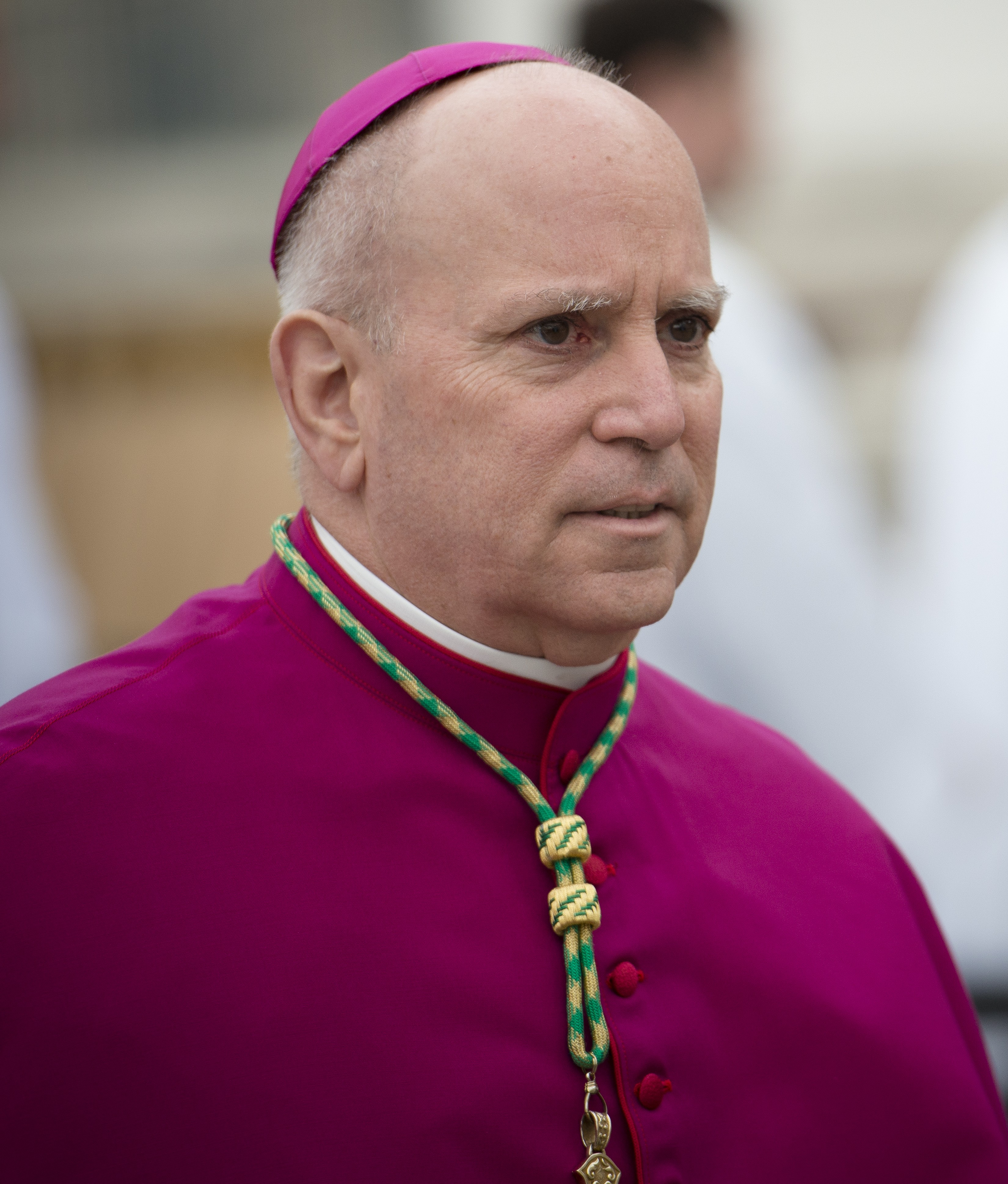
Archbishop Aquila (2014)

=== Vicar Apostolic of Colorado ===
Joseph Projectus Machebeuf (1868–1889)

=== Bishops of Denver ===
1. Joseph Projectus Machebeuf (1868–1889)
2. Nicholas Chrysostom Matz (1889–1917)
3. John Henry Tihen (1917–1931)
4. Urban John Vehr (1931–1941), Elevated to Archbishop

=== Archbishops of Denver ===
1. Urban John Vehr (1941–1967)
2. James Vincent Casey (1967–1986)
3. James Francis Stafford (1986–1996), appointed President of the Pontifical Council for the Laity and later Major Penitentiary of the Apostolic Penitentiary (elevated to Cardinal in 1998)
4. Charles J. Chaput, OFM Cap (1997–2011), appointed Archbishop of Philadelphia
5. Samuel Joseph Aquila (2012–2026)
6. James R. Golka (2026-present)

=== Auxiliary bishops of Denver ===
- David M. Maloney (1961–1967), appointed Bishop of Wichita
- George Evans (1969–1985)
- Richard Hanifen (1974–1984), appointed Bishop of Colorado Springs
- Jose Horacio Gómez Velasco (2001–2005), appointed Archbishop of San Antonio and later Coadjutor Archbishop of Los Angeles and subsequently succeeded to the latter see
- James D. Conley (2008–2012), appointed Bishop of Lincoln
- Jorge Rodríguez-Novelo (2016–present)

=== Other diocesan priests who became bishops ===
- Hubert Michael Newell, appointed Coadjutor Bishop (in 1947) and later Bishop of Cheyenne
- Ralph Walker Nickless, appointed Bishop of Sioux City in 2005
- John Baptist Pitaval, appointed Auxiliary Bishop of Santa Fe in 1902 and later Archbishop of Santa Fe

== High schools ==
- Bishop Machebeuf Catholic High School, Denver
- Holy Family High School, Broomfield

== Seminaries ==
- Saint John Vianney Theological Seminary, Denver
- Redemptoris Mater Seminary, Denver

== Cemeteries ==
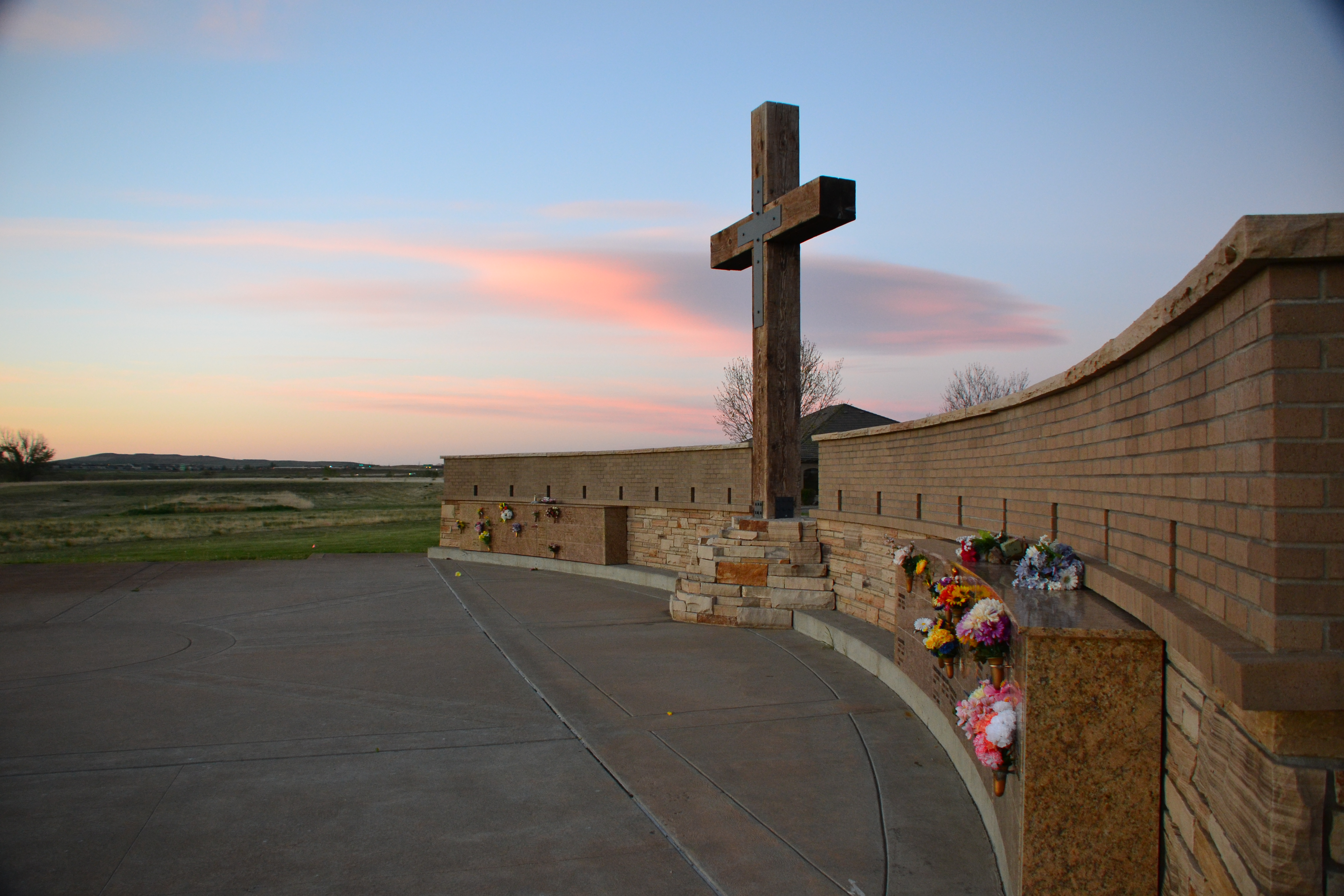
Cross at St. Simeon Cemetery

- Saint Simeon Catholic Cemetery in Aurora is operated by the Archdiocese of Denver.
- Mount Olivet Cemetery, Wheat Ridge, consecrated 1892
- Saint Simeon Catholic Cemetery, Aurora, dedicated 2004

== Media ==
Denver's first Catholic newspaper, the Denver Catholic, published its first issue in 1900, under editor F. J. Kramer. It received the endorsement of Bishop Matz. The Catholic published its last issue in 1904, due to a lack of revenue.

In 1905, Thomas Casey began publishing the Catholic Register of Denver as an edition of the Catholic Register of Kansas City, Missouri. It became the Denver Catholic Register beginning with the next issue. In 1910, a group of priests and laymen formed the Catholic Publishing Society, which took over management of the Register, made it the diocese's official newspaper. The owners directed that all profits go to the support of orphans. However, it proved to be a money-losing enterprise.

In 1913, Hugh McMenamin, the rector at the Cathedral of the Immaculate Conception, bought a controlling stake in the Catholic Publishing Society and named Matthew J. Smith as its editor. Smith quickly turned the business around. In 1921, Bishop Tihen gained a controlling interest in the paper, placing it under diocesan ownership. In 1925, the diocese began publishing The Register on Tuesdays while the Denver Catholic Register continued to publish on Thursdays, as part of a plan to eventually publish daily.

In 1927, Smith launched a national edition, the National Catholic Register, with four pages of national and international news. The two editions would soon merge, as the Register became a national chain of Catholic newspapers. In 1970, Patrick Frawley's Twin Circle Publishing purchased the National Catholic Register from the archdiocese. The Denver Catholic Register reverted to being a local publication. In 2015, its name was shortened to Denver Catholic, and it became a magazine in 2020.
