= John Henry Tihen =

American prelate

His Excellency, The Most Reverend John Henry Tihen
- Bishop of Denver; Titular Bishop of Bosana
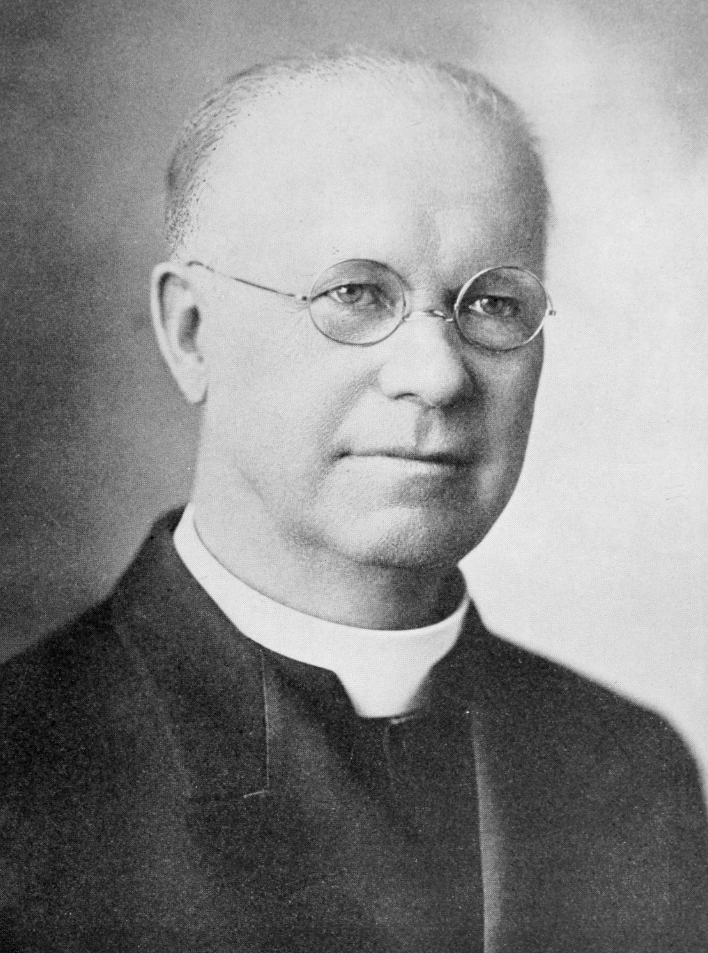
- Church: Roman Catholic Church
- See: Diocese of Denver
- In office: September 21, 1917— January 6, 1931
- Predecessor: Nicholas Chrysostom Matz
- Successor: Urban John Vehr
- Previous post: Bishop of Lincoln (1911 to 1917)

Orders
- Ordination: April 26, 1886 by Michael Heiss
- Consecration: July 6, 1911 by John Joseph Hennessy

Personal details
- Born: July 14, 1861 Oldenburg, Indiana, US
- Died: January 14, 1940 (aged 78) Wichita, Kansas, US
- Motto: Ut omnes unum sint (That all may be one)

John Henry Tihen (July 14, 1861 – January 14, 1940) was an American prelate of the Roman Catholic Church. He served as bishop of the Diocese of Lincoln in Nebraska (1911–1917) and as bishop of the Diocese of Denver in Colorado (1917–1931).

== Biography ==
=== Early life ===
John Tihen was born on July 14, 1861, in Oldenburg, Indiana, to Herman Bernard and Angela (née Bruns) Tihen, both German immigrants. When he was still a child, he and his family moved to Jefferson City, Missouri, where he attended parochial schools. After graduating from St. Benedict College in Atchison, Kansas, he entered St. Francis Seminary in St. Francis, Wisconsin, in 1882.

=== Priesthood ===
Tihen was ordained to the priesthood for the Archdiocese of St. Louis by Archbishop Michael Heiss on April 26, 1886, in St. Louis, Missouri. After his ordination, the archdiocese assigned Tihen as a curate at St. John's Parish in St. Louis. In 1888, he followed Bishop John Hennessy to the new Diocese of Wichita in Kansas Tihen served as rector of the cathedral and chancellor of the diocese. In 1907, Tihen was named vicar general, that same year, the Vatican elevated him to the rank of domestic prelate.

=== Bishop of Lincoln ===
On May 12, 1911, Tihen was appointed the second bishop of Lincoln by Pope Pius X. He received his episcopal consecration Wichita on July 6, 1911, from Hennessy, with Bishops Nicholas Matz and Richard Scannell serving as co-consecrators at the Pro-Cathedral of Saint Aloysius.

=== Bishop of Denver ===
Following the death of Matz, Tihen was named the third bishop of Denver by Pope Benedict XV on September 21, 1917. He was installed on December 21, 1917.

After the American entry into World War I in 1917, Tihen urged parishioners to buy Liberty bonds to support the American war effort. He also supported the work of the National Catholic War Council to provide chaplains for Catholic troops in the US armed forces. He organized students at Catholic schools as the U.S. Boys Working Reserve and the Children's Red Cross Campaign. In recognition of his support for the war effort, Tihen was appointed by Denver Mayor W. F. R. Mills as a delegate to the Mid-Continent Congress of the League of Nations in February 1919. During the 1920s, he defended the Catholic church in Colorado from attacks by the Ku Klux Klan, which he condemned as "an anti-Catholic and un-American society." He also supported women's suffrage movement and the labor movement, and founded The Denver Catholic Register in 1905.

During his tenure, Tihen organized the diocesan Catholic Charities; increased the number of parochial schools from 31 to 49, and the number of priests from 174 to 229; dedicated 41 churches; and established Loretto Heights College, three hospitals, an orphanage, and a home for the aged.

=== Retirement and legacy ===
On January 6, 1931, Pope Pius XI accepted Tihen's resignation as bishop of Denver and appointed him titular bishop of Bosana. In September 1931, he left Denver to take up residence at St. Francis Hospital in Wichita, Kansas. He became an invalid in March 1938, after suffering a paralytic stroke. Tihen died in Wichita on January 14, 1940, at age 78, and was buried at Mount Olivet Cemetery in Wheat Ridge, Colorado.

Catholic Church titles
Preceded by Thomas Bonacum	Bishop of Lincoln; 1911–1917	Succeeded by Charles Joseph O'Reilly
Preceded by Nicholas Chrysostom Matz	Bishop of Denver; 1917–1931	Succeeded by Urban John Vehr
Preceded by Established	Titular Bishop of Bosana; 1931–1940	Succeeded by Vincentas Brizgys
