= St. Thomas Seminary (Denver) =

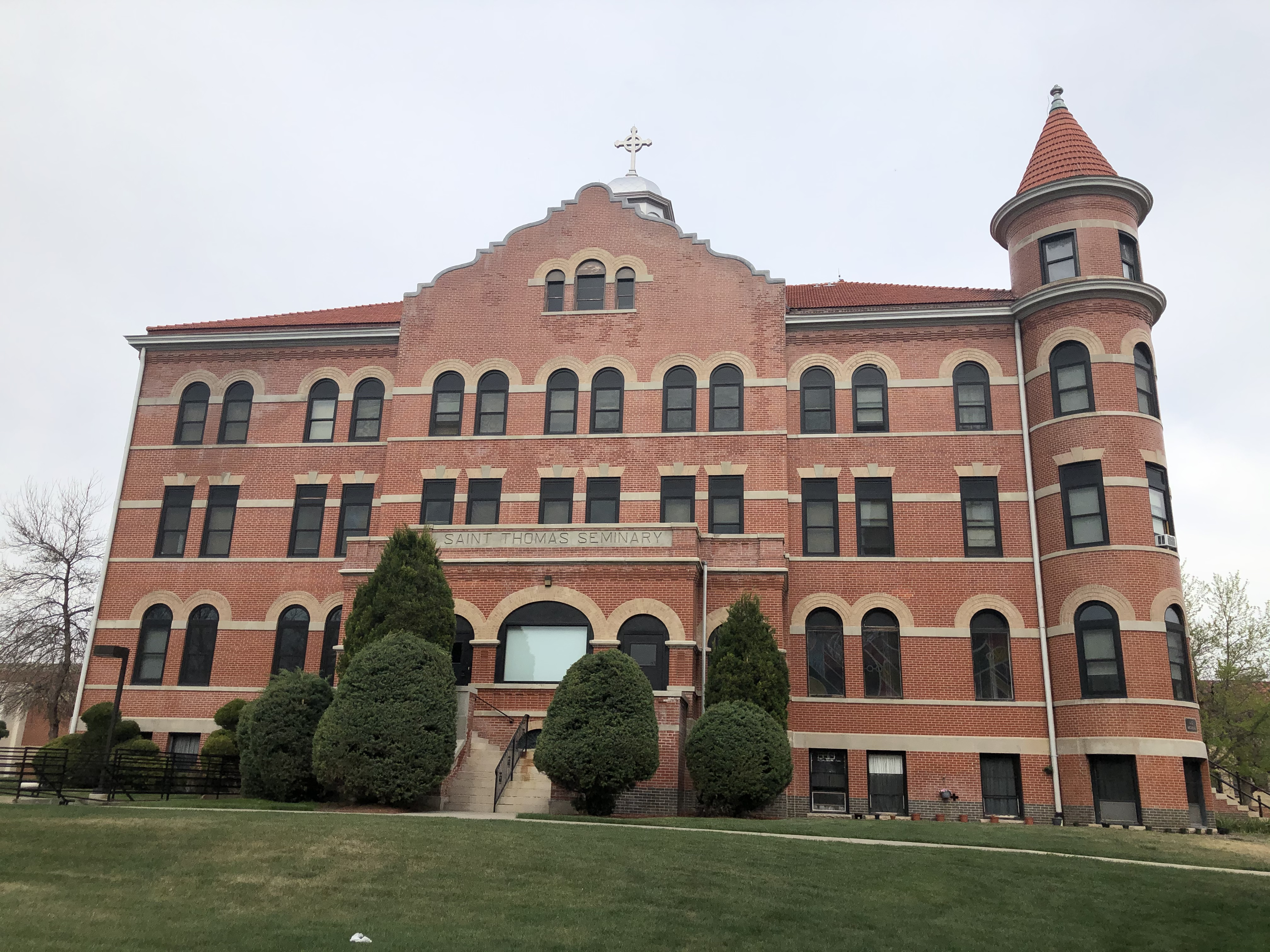
- St. Thomas Seminary building
- Type: Private Catholic major seminary
- Active: 1908–1995
- Affiliation: Congregation of the Mission (Vincentians)
- Location: Denver, USA; 39.6927°N 104.9477°W
- Campus: 40 acres (16 ha)

St. Thomas Seminary was a Catholic major seminary in southeast Denver, Colorado. It was owned by the Vincentians until it closed in 1995 due to falling enrollment.

Set on a 40-acre (16 ha) campus, the buildings were generally grouped around a quadrangle, the first of which was built in 1908. Future buildings were designed by architect Jules J.B. Benedict in the Mediterranean Revival style. The property is on the U.S. National Register of Historic Places.
