= Joseph Projectus Machebeuf =

Catholic bishop and missionary

His Excellency, The Most Reverend Joseph Projectus Machebeuf
- Bishop of Denver
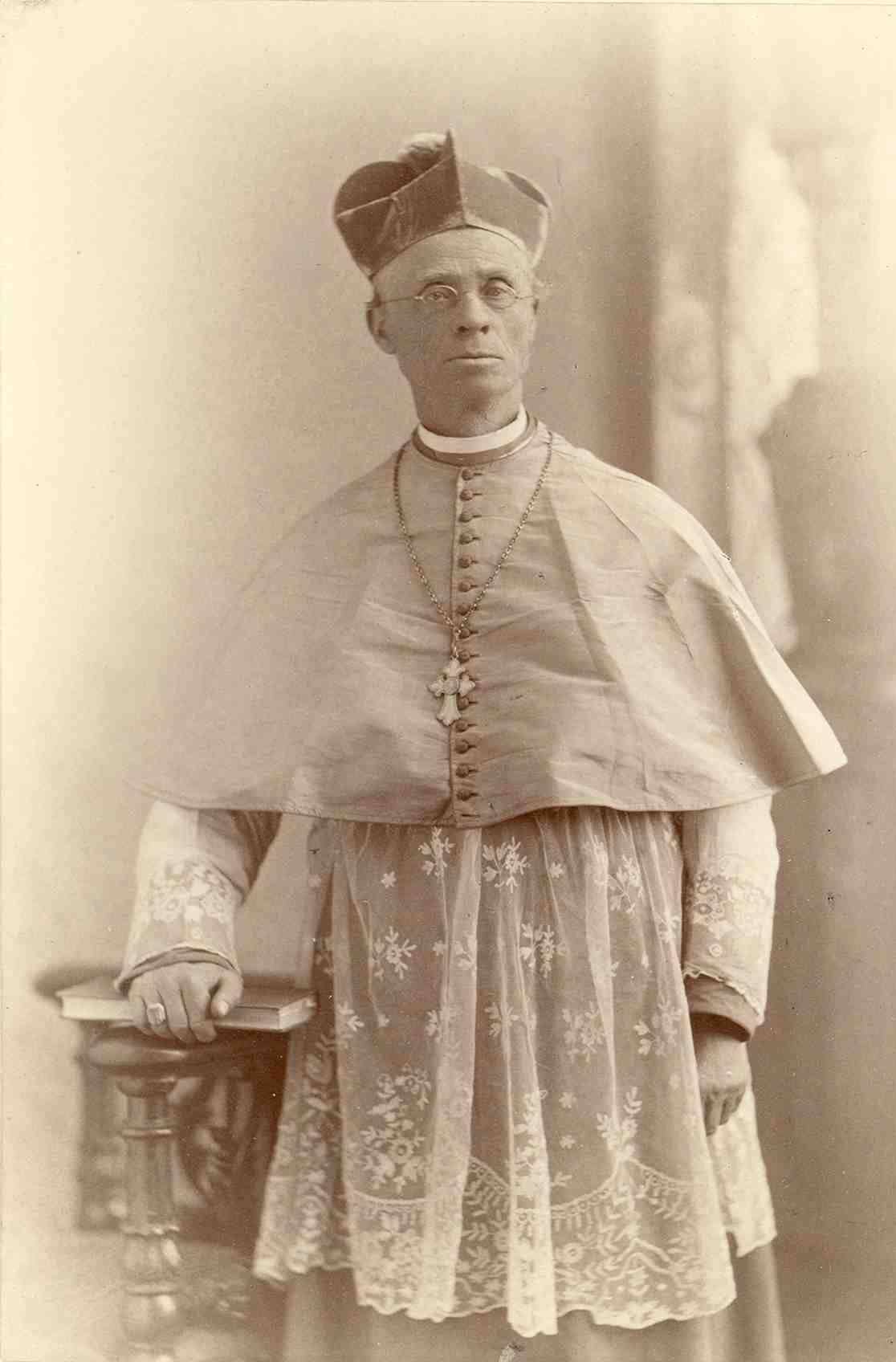
- Church: Roman Catholic Church
- See: Denver
- In office: August 16, 1868—July 10, 1889
- Predecessor: none
- Successor: Nicholas Chrysostom Matz

Orders
- Ordination: December 17, 1836
- Consecration: August 16, 1868 by John Baptist Purcell

Personal details
- Born: August 11, 1812 Riom, Puy-de-Dôme, France
- Died: July 10, 1889 (aged 76) Denver, Colorado, United States

Joseph Projectus Machebeuf (August 11, 1812 – July 10, 1889) was a French Roman Catholic missionary and the first Bishop of Denver.

== Biography ==
The eldest of five children, Machebeuf was born in Riom to Michael and Gilberte (née Plauc) Machebeuf. He received his early education from the Brothers of the Christian Schools, and studied the classics in the college of his native city. He then entered the Sulpician-run seminary of Montferrand in 1831, and upon completing his course in philosophy and theology, was ordained to the priesthood by Bishop Louis-Charles Féron on December 17, 1836.

He served as a curate in Le Cendre until 1839, when he accepted the invitation of Bishop John Baptist Purcell to join the Diocese of Cincinnati, Ohio, in the United States. He was first assigned as a curate in Tiffin and then as pastor of Lower Sandusky and Sandusky in 1841. He founded Holy Angels Catholic Church, Sandusky; St Ann's Catholic Church, Fremont; and St Philomena's Catholic Church, La Prairie. He left Ohio in 1851 to join his friend, Jean-Baptiste Lamy in New Mexico.

Following the elevation of Lamy to Vicar Apostolic of New Mexico in 1850, Machebeuf accompanied him and became his vicar-general. He served as pastor at Albuquerque (1853–1858) and at Santa Fe (1858–1860) before being transferred to Colorado, where he was thrown from his carriage while descending a spur of the Rocky Mountains and left lame. In Colorado, he organized parishes, procured priests and by 1868 had erected eighteen churches. He also built the first church in Denver.

On March 3, 1868, Machebeuf was appointed Vicar Apostolic of Colorado and Utah as well as Titular Bishop of Epiphania in Cilicia by Pope Pius IX. He received his episcopal consecration on the following August 16 from Bishop Purcell, with Bishops Louis Amadeus Rappe and Louis De Goesbriand serving as co-consecrators.

He founded an academy and a school for boys in Denver (not to be confused with the college preparatory high school named in his honor, but founded after his death), a convent of the Sisters of Loretto and St. Joseph's Hospital. He also helped to establish the House of the Good Shepherd and the College of the Sacred Heart (now part of Regis University); the Catholic population of Colorado increased under his tenure from a few thousand to upwards of 50,000.

On August 7, 1887, the vicariate was elevated to the rank of a diocese, and Machebeuf was named its first bishop. He died two years later, aged 76.

== Legacy ==
His life was the basis for the character Joseph Vaillant in Willa Cather's 1927 novel Death Comes for the Archbishop.

He is also the namesake of Bishop Machebeuf High School, located in Denver, Colorado; the school was founded in 1958.

Catholic Church titles
Preceded by none	Bishop of Denver; March 3, 1868 – July 10, 1889	Succeeded by Nicholas Chrysostom Matz
