= Cathedral Basilica of the Immaculate Conception (Denver) =

Historic church in Colorado, United States

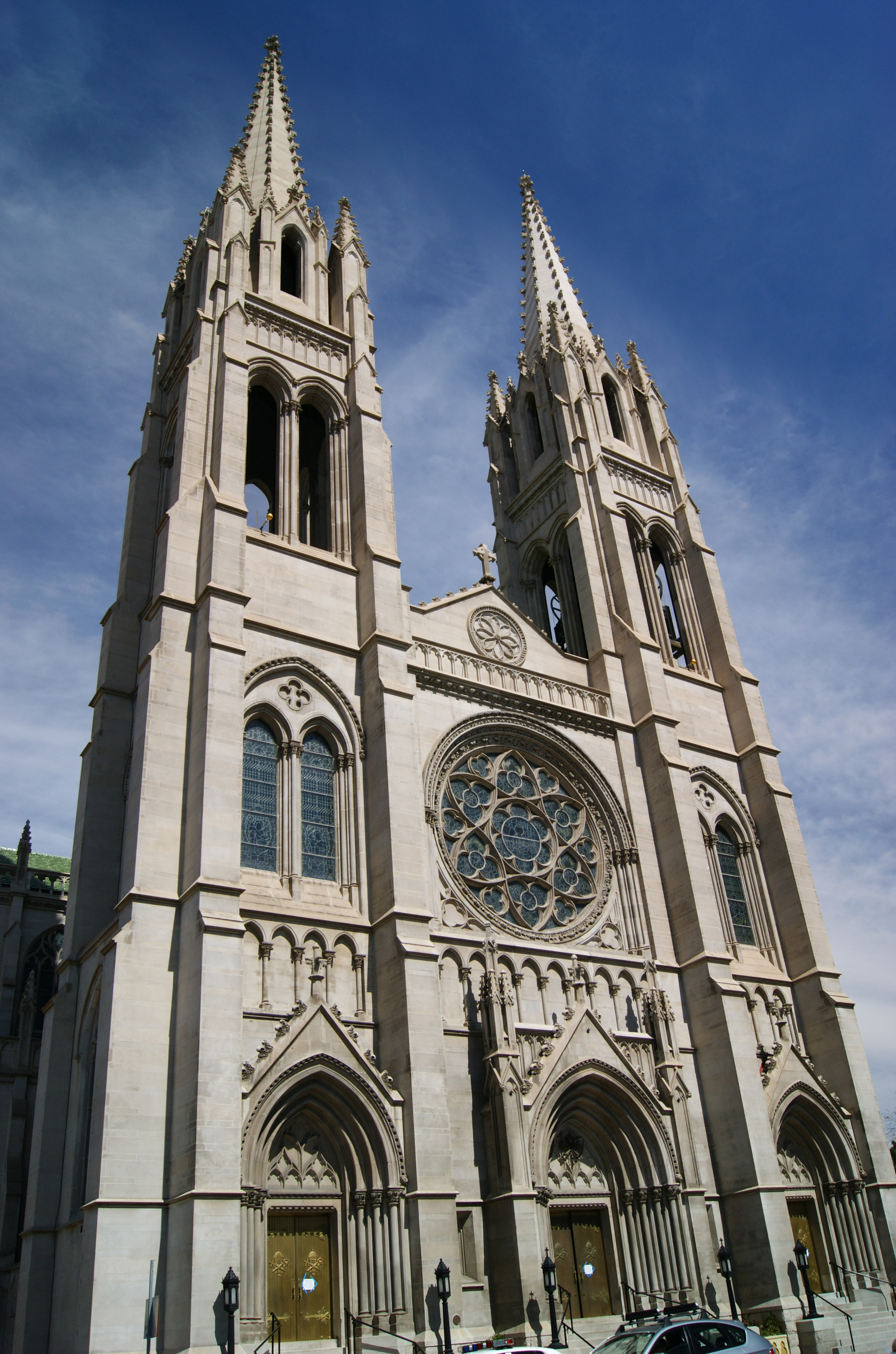

- Location within Colorado
- 39°44′25.01″N 104°58′54.98″W
- Location: 401 East Colfax Avenue; Denver, Colorado
- Country: United States
- Denomination: Roman Catholic Church
- Website: www.denvercathedral.org

History
- Founded: 1860
- Consecrated: 1921

Architecture
- Style: Gothic Revival
- Groundbreaking: 1906
- Completed: 1921

Specifications
- Capacity: 895
- Materials: Granite, Limestone

Administration
- Archdiocese: Archdiocese of Denver

Clergy
- Archbishop: Most Rev. James Robert Golka
- Rector: Very Rev. Michael Bodzioch

U.S. National Register of Historic Places
- Designated: March 3, 1975
- Reference no.: 7500506

Colorado State Register of Historic Properties
- Reference no.: 5DV.111

The Cathedral Basilica of the Immaculate Conception is the cathedral of the Archdiocese of Denver of the Roman Catholic Church. It is located at the corner of Logan Street and Colfax Avenue in the North Capitol Hill neighborhood of central Denver. It has a seating capacity of 895 persons.

Construction started on Immaculate Conception in 1901, but it was not completed until 1911. The dedication was in 1912. It underwent a major renovation in 1974 and then a project in 2016 to repair significant defects and safety hazards in the exterior walls and carvings. The cathedral was subjected to vandalism incidents in 2020 and 2021. It was elevated to a minor basilica in 1979.

== History ==
=== 1860 to 1900 ===
The first Catholic church in Denver was St. Mary's Church, built in 1860 at what is now 15th and Stout streets. The church lacked glass for the windows, so the priest had to nail canvas over the openings. When Pope Pius IX erected the Vicariate Apostolic of Colorado and Utah in 1868, St. Mary's became its first cathedral. By the 1870s, the growth in what was now the Diocese of Denver necessitated a larger cathedral.A group of Catholics in Denver formed the Immaculate Conception Cathedral Association in 1880 to plan for a new cathedral. However, Bishop Joseph Machebeuf was more focused on erecting churches and missions in Colorado.

When Reverend Nicholas C. Matz was appointed coadjutor bishop of Denver in 1887, he knew that the diocese needed a bigger cathedral. He spent $51,000 to build a temporary brick and sandstone pro-cathedral on Logan Street in Denver that also served as the parish school. At the same time, several donors paid for a large property for the construction of a permanent cathedral. Matz considered started the new cathedral in the early 1890s, but the financial panic of 1893 derailed those plans.

=== 1900 to 2000 ===
Matz finally started construction of the new cathedral in 1901. However, the archdiocese lost a $58,000 from investments in mining in Cripple Creek, Colorado, bringing the project to a halt. Several prominent Denver residents came together to establish a fundraising effort for July 1906, referred to as the 'Carnival of Nations.' Margaret Brown, better known as Molly Brown was one of the planners. The $4,000 raised from the event allowed construction to continue That same month, the cornerstone was laid for the cathedral.However, the national panic of 1907 delayed the project again.

In 1908, Reverend Hugh L. McMenamin was named assistant pastor of the pro-cathedral. He immediately started fundraising to complete the cathedral project. Immaculate Conception Cathedral was completed in 1911 with a final cost of approximately $500,000. In August 1912, lightning struck the west tower of the cathedral, toppling the upper 25 feet (7.6 m); however, the tower was repaired before its dedication.

Immaculate Conception cathedral was dedicated by Cardinal John Farley on October 27, 1912. Over 35,000 people, Catholics and non-Catholics, gathered at the cathedral for the ceremony. It was attended by Colorado Governor John F. Shafroth and Denver Mayor John B. McGauran.The completion of the cathedral left the diocese $250,000. To raise funds, McMenamin sold naming rights to objects in the cathedral and started a new fundraising campaign.In 1911, John K. Mullen, the owner of a milling company in Denver, donated $110,000 to the diocese to settle most of the cathedral debt, reportedly funded by raising the price of his flour by one cent. By 1913, the cathedral parish had approximately 3,500 members, most of them Irish.

The cathedral was finally consecrated on October 23, 1921; it was estimated that 150,000 showed up for the ceremony. Also in 1921, the archdiocese opened Cathedral High School on the cathedral campus. A gym and theater for the school were completed in 1928. Following the liturgical reforms of the Second Vatican Council in the early 1960s, the archdiocese removed the stone altar rail and expanded the chancel to accommodate a second, freestanding altar. The seating capacity of the cathedral was reduced from 1,000 to 895 worshippers.

In 1974, the archdiocese embarked on an extensive renovation of Immaculate Conception. The electrical system was rewired and the sanctuary enlarged. The acoustics and lighting in the sanctuary were also upgraded.That same year Eleanor Weckbaugh, the granddaughter of John K. Mullen, sued the diocese in an unsuccessful attempt to stop the alterations.

Pope John Paul II elevated the cathedral to the status of minor basilica on December 25, 1979. During his papal visit to the United States in August 1993, John Paul II celebrated mass at the cathedral. In June 1997, lightning struck a second time, damaging the east tower. It was restored within eight months.

=== 2000 to present ===
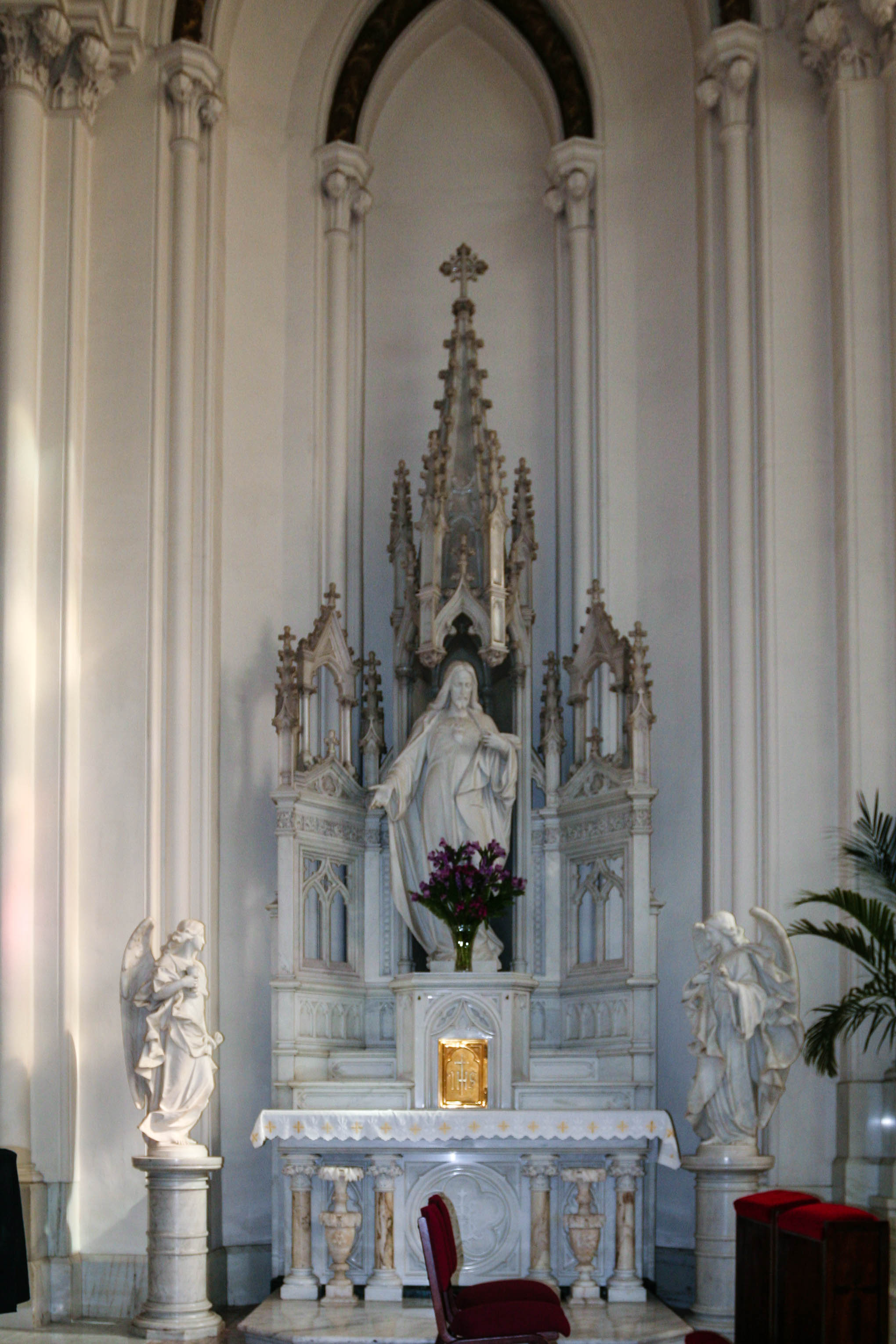
Sacred Heart side altar, Cathedral Basilica of the Immaculate Conception (2013)

In April 2016, a large rock fell from the cathedral facade onto the stairs at the front entrance. An inspection revealed numerous cracks in the stone and joints that were missing mortar. Many of the carvings on the building were unstable and required removal. The repair project ended up costing $4.4 million and took a year to complete.

From May 29 to June 1, 2020, the United States was swept by protests over the murder of George Floyd by a policeman in Minneapolis, Minnesota. During this period, protests raged in the neighborhood of the cathedral, which was vandalized multiple times. The damage included small fires and anti-Catholic graffiti on the exterior walls. During the unrest, police tear gas penetrated the building.

In October 2021 the cathedral was vandalized again with swastikas and graffiti being sprayed on doors and statues around the cathedral. The perpetrator, a young woman who was a former Catholic, surrendered to authorities in January 2022. She was charged with criminal mischief and a hate crime.

== Architecture ==
=== Exterior ===
Immaculate Conception Cathedral was designed by the Architect Leon Coquard of Detroit in the French Gothic style. He was inspired by several prominent Catholic churches in Europe, including the Saint Nicholas Collegiate Church Munster, Moselle in France. When Coquard became ill, the Denver architects Aaron Gove and Thomas Walsh completed the project.

The cathedral has the shape of a Latin cross measuring 195 by 116 feet (59 by 35 m) with the nave rising to 68 feet (21 m). The main façade houses three entrances and is framed by two 221-foot (67 m) spires. The structure is constructed of Indiana limestone and granite from Gunnison, Colorado. The altar, statuary, pedestals, pulpit, communion rail, and bishop's chair are all made of Carrara marble from Carrara, Italy. The confessional, vestibules, balustrades, risers, steps, baseboards, and pillar bases are fabricated with Yule marble from Marble, Colorado.

=== Interior ===
==== Stained glass ====
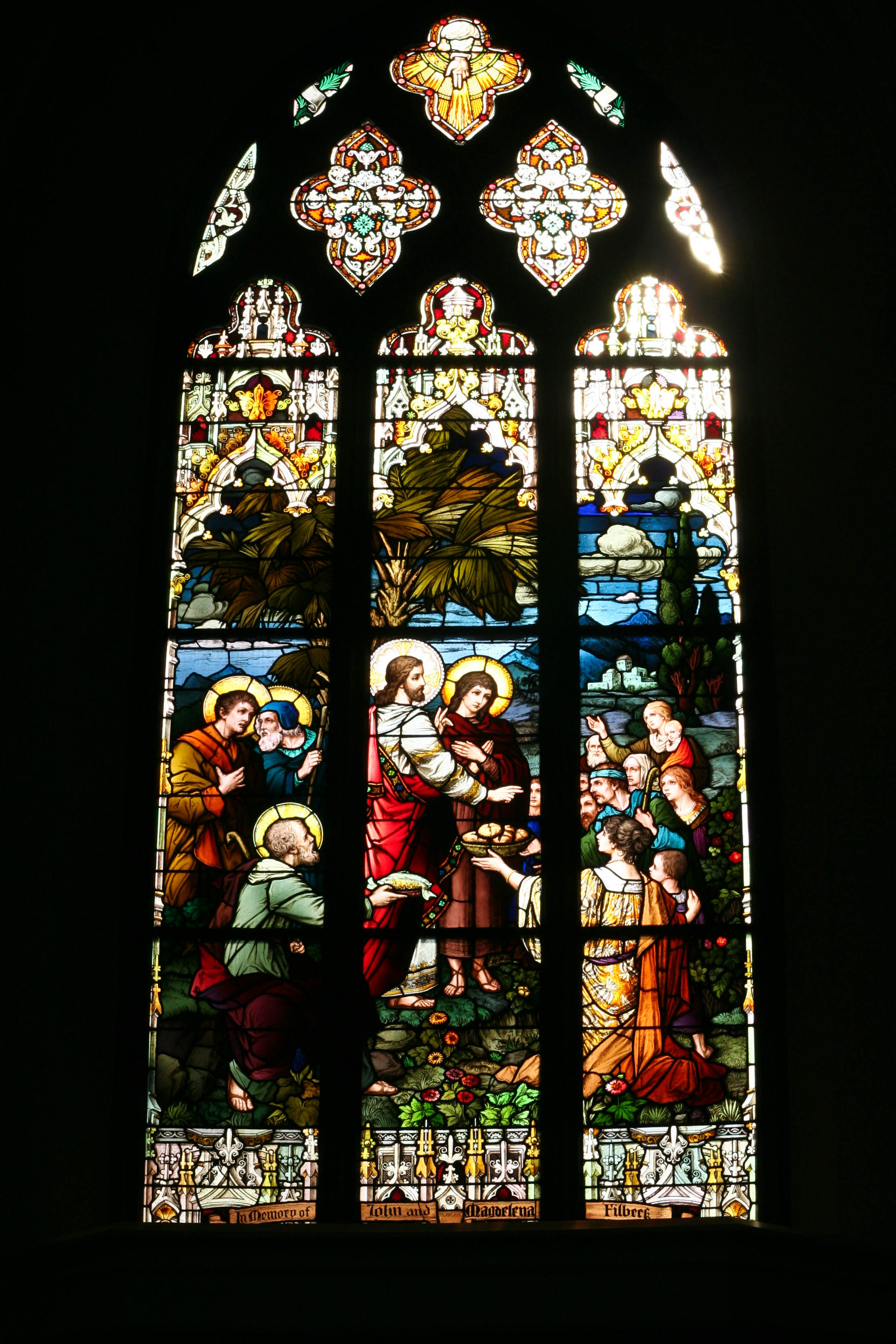
"Feeding the multitudes", Cathedral Basilica of the Immaculate Conception (2013)

The cathedral has 75 stained glass windows containing 20,000 pieces of glass. The windows were crafter by 50 artisans at the Royal Bavarian Art Institute in Munich, Germany, and cost $34,000. Sparkling silver and dry powder paint were used in their creation. They are installed on the east and west transept windows. The scenes include the presentation of the Virgin Mary in the Temple of Jerusalem, the Last Supper and the feeding of the multitudes.

A rose window above the choir loft portrays seven angels. One small stained glass window is located in the Children's Chapel; it portrays of the parish school teachers. Her students donated pennies, nickels, and dimes to create it.

==== Chapels and side altars ====
The Children's Chapel contains the Guardian Angel Shrine, which includes the statute Guardian Angel and Child.The second Chapel is the St. Paul Chapel. The cathedral contains three side altars

- Blessed Mother
- St. Joseph
- Sacred Heart - it contains a statue of the Virgin Mary flanked at the base by two angels.

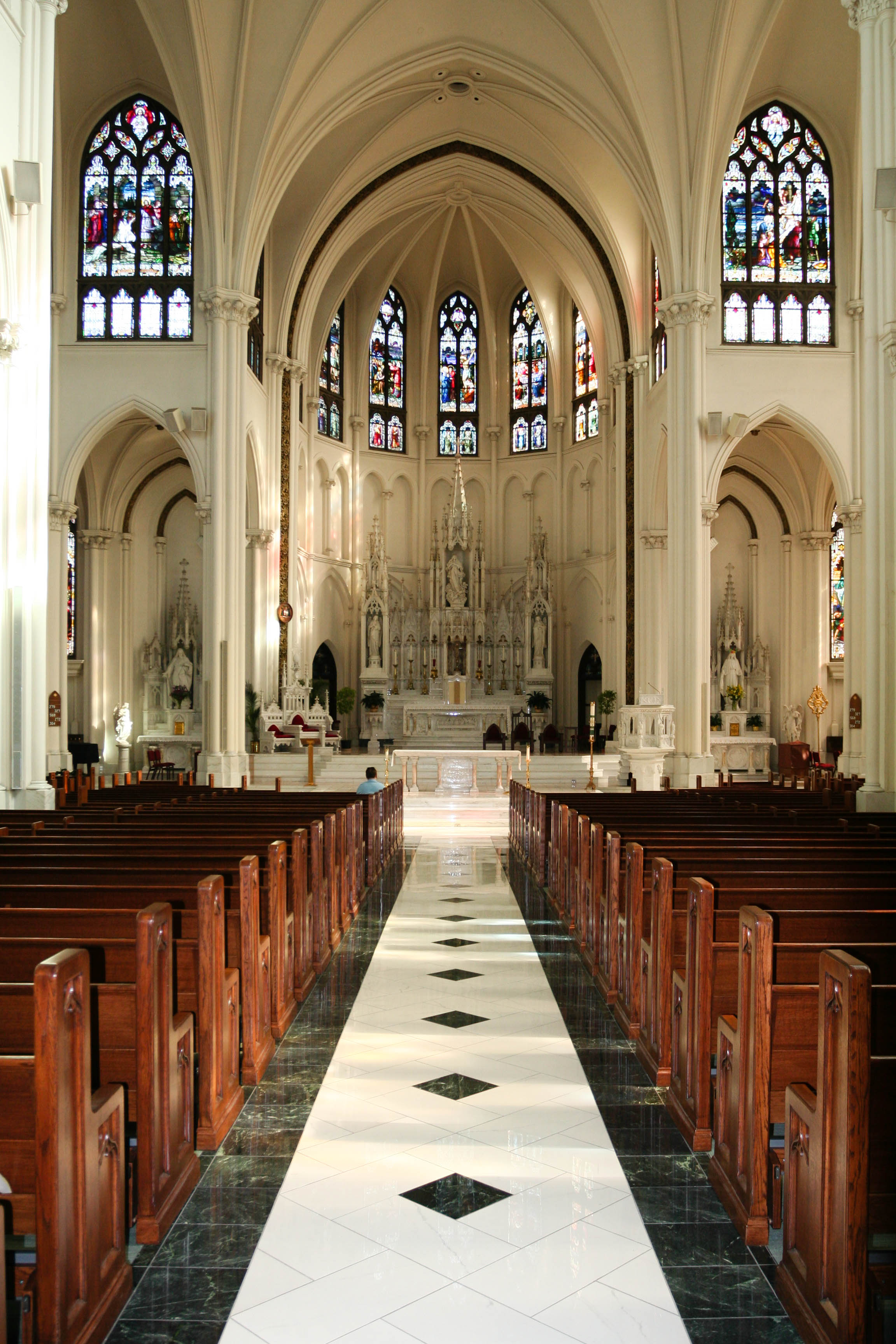
Cathedral nave, Cathedral Basilica of the Immaculate Conception (2013)

== See also ==
- Julia Greeley
- List of Catholic cathedrals in the United States
- List of cathedrals in the United States
- Roman Catholic Marian churches
- Yule marble
