= Church of the Immaculate Conception (Rapid City, South Dakota) =

Historic church in South Dakota, United States

- U.S. National Register of Historic Places
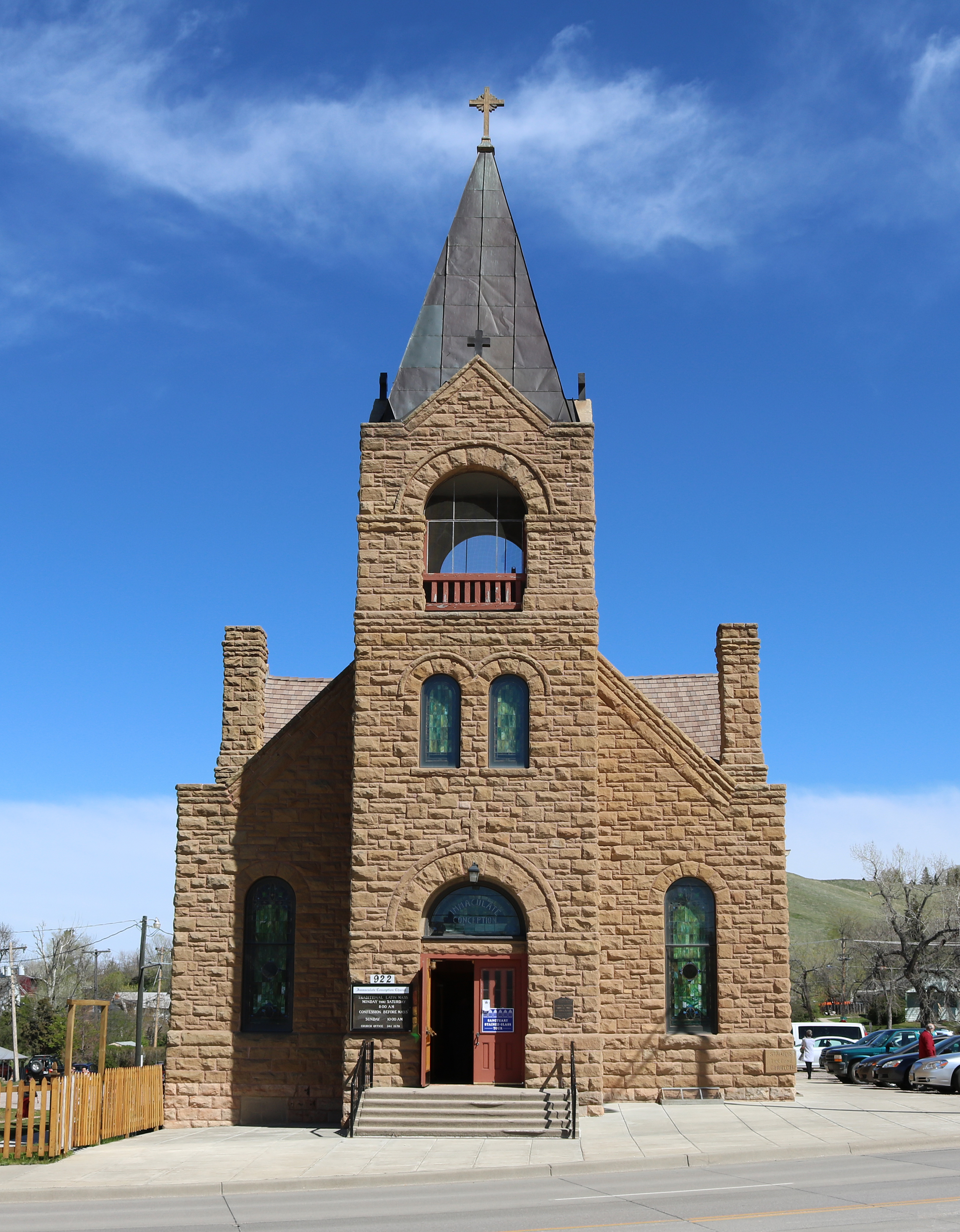
- The church in 2017

- Location within South Dakota Location within the United States
- Location: 918 5th St. Rapid City, South Dakota
- Coordinates: 44°4′33″N 103°13′31″W
- Area: 1 acre (0.40 ha)
- Built: 1902
- Architectural style: Romanesque
- NRHP reference No.: 75001721
- Added to NRHP: June 5, 1975

The Church of the Immaculate Conception (also Old Cathedral of the Immaculate Conception) is a historic building located in Rapid City, South Dakota, United States. Built as a parish church, it became the cathedral of the Diocese of Rapid City when the seat of the diocese was moved to Rapid City. It is now known as the Chapel of the Immaculate Conception.

== History ==
St. Mary's Church was established in 1881. The cornerstone for its sandstone church building, designed in the Romanesque Revival style, was laid in 1909. It was dedicated in 1911. The Catholic Diocese of Lead was relocated and became the Diocese of Rapid City in 1930. St. Mary's Church was renamed the Cathedral of the Immaculate Conception at that time. Cardinal Francis Spellman came to the cathedral in 1948 to install William McCarty, C.Ss.R as the new bishop of the diocese.

The parish soon outgrew the church and it was replaced by the Cathedral of Our Lady of Perpetual Help in 1962. The church was added to the National Register in 1975. In time Immaculate Conception became a chapel and has housed a community where Mass is celebrated in Latin since 1992.

== Architecture ==
The church building follows basically a rectangular plan with a cross-gabled section in the center of the structure. Both side gables are flanked by chimneys and are capped with a cross. The stone cladding was quarried locally. A square central tower capped with a pyramid-shaped spire covered with terneplate is located on the main facade. It includes the main entrance with a round-arch stained glass window above the three-panel doors. The round-arch openings in the bell chamber feature a balustrade. Round-arch windows filled with stained glass line the side elevations. The three windows in the cross-gabled section are taller than the four windows that flank it. Most of the windows are composed of geometric designs. The two largest windows depict Biblical scenes. All the window openings are capped by radiating voussoirs. The apse, constructed of vertical board on the rear elevation, is a later addition.

Immaculate Conception is considered significant as the best example of the Romanesque Revival style in Rapid City, and one of only a few of this style that still exists there. It is the last known cut stone building constructed in the city, and one of two buildings with rock-faced facades that remain.

== See also ==
- Website of Immaculate Conception Church, Rapid City, SD
- List of Catholic cathedrals in the United States
- List of cathedrals in the United States
