= Michel Mulloy =

American priest of the Catholic Church

The Reverend Father Michel Joseph Mulloy
- Church: Catholic Church
- Diocese: Rapid City

Orders
- Ordination: June 8, 1979

Personal details
- Born: May 20, 1954 (age 72) Mobridge, South Dakota
- Denomination: Roman Catholicism
- Education: Saint Mary's University of Minnesota; Saint Paul Seminary

Michel Joseph Mulloy (born May 20, 1954) is an American priest of the Catholic Church. He was bishop-elect of the Diocese of Duluth from June 2020 to September 2020 when he resigned his posts and ceased exercising his ministry following an allegation of sexual abuse of a minor. He previously served in the dioceses of Sioux Falls and Rapid City. He was vicar general of the latter from 2017 to 2020.

== Early life ==
Mulloy was born in Mobridge, South Dakota, on May 20, 1954. He completed his primary education there and studied at Mobridge High School, before moving to Sioux Falls and attending O'Gorman Catholic High School. He went on to study at Saint Mary's University in Winona, Minnesota, obtaining a Bachelor of Arts in classical humanities from that institution. He subsequently attended seminary at the Saint Paul Seminary in Saint Paul, Minnesota. On June 8, 1979, Mulloy was ordained to the Catholic priesthood for the Diocese of Sioux Falls.

== Presbyteral ministry ==
Mulloy's first pastoral assignment was as a fidei donum priest (i.e. sent to a mission territory) to the Diocese of Rapid City, where he was assistant parish priest at the Cathedral of Our Lady of Perpetual Help. He was then transferred to Christ the King Parish (Sioux Falls) as an assistant two years later, before becoming the administrator of St. Joseph's Parish (Faith) in 1983. He was consequently incardinated in Rapid City on a permanent basis and served in that diocese for over three decades beginning in 1986. In May 2017, he became vicar general of Rapid City. As such, he was deputy to the diocesan bishop, Robert D. Gruss, and became diocesan administrator when Gruss was installed as Bishop of Saginaw in July 2019. He served as administrator until the ordination of Peter Michael Muhich as bishop of Rapid City in July 2020.

== Episcopal ministry ==
Mulloy was appointed Bishop of Duluth on June 19, 2020. His consecration and installation as bishop was scheduled for October 1, 2020. But before he could be ordained Pope Francis accepted his resignation on September 7, 2020. On August 7, the Rapid City Diocese had received an allegation that Mulloy sexually abused a minor in the 1980s. The Diocese informed law enforcement officials and ordered Mulloy to "refrain from engaging in ministry". In March 2023, the Vatican determined that it could not prove the allegation against Mulloy; however, he was not returned to public ministry.
