= Rapid City Catholic School System =

Private school system in Rapid City, South Dakota, United States

St. Thomas More High School
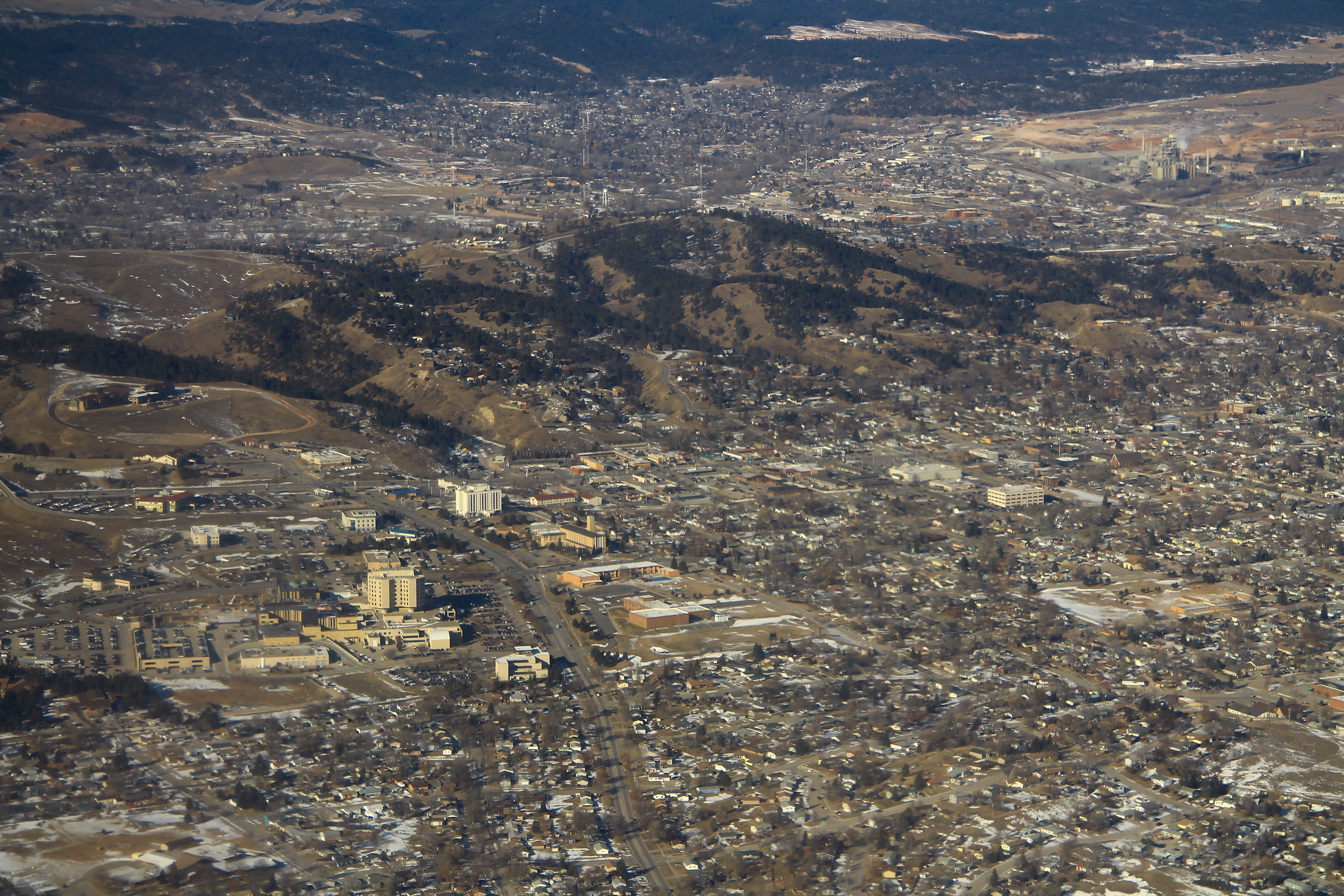
- Aerial view of the school & surrounding area

Location
- 300 Fairmont Boulevard; Rapid City, (Pennington County), South Dakota 57701; United States
- 44°3′33″N 103°13′25″W

Information
- Type: Private, Coeducational
- Motto: We form hearts and minds in the Truth
- Religious affiliation: Roman Catholic
- Established: 1991
- Superintendent: Julie Tipton
- Grades: Preschool–12
- Athletics conference: Black Hills Conference
- Affiliation: Diocese of Rapid City
- Website: rccss.org

Rapid City Catholic School System (RCCSS) is a set of private, Roman Catholic schools in Rapid City, South Dakota. It is made up of two campuses, with the preschool (pre-K) and elementary students (K-5) attending St. Elizabeth Seton, and middle (6–8) and high school (9–12) students at the main campus attending St. Thomas More. It is a part of the Diocese of Rapid City.

== Parishes ==
The Rapid City Catholic School System serves the following parishes:

- Blessed Sacrament
- Cathedral of Our Lady of Perpetual Help
- Our Lady of the Black Hills
- St. Isaac Jogues
- St. Therese

== Athletics ==
The St. Thomas More High School girls' basketball team won five straight class A state championships from 2013 to 2018 under coach Brandon Kandolin. They became the third team to do so in the state of South Dakota, behind Armour High School and later Sioux Falls Roosevelt.

St. Thomas More High School won the South Dakota state 11B football championship for the first time in the 2025 season, defeating Elk Point Jefferson 48–38.

== Connection to scandals ==
Andrew Hiipakka, a teacher for the St. Thomas More Middle School, was convicted on child pornography charges after being caught with "thousands of images of child pornography, many of which depicted children under the age of 12 years". He was sentenced to 25 years in prison and a life of supervised release.

Marcin Garbacz was a Catholic priest and served as the Chaplain for the RCCSS office for some time between 2012 up to at least 2015. During this time, he was assigned to the Catholic Diocese of Rapid City, but would also lead the weekly in-school Mass for the middle and high school and was considered to be an RCCSS staff member. Garbacz was convicted of stealing over $250,000 from parish donations over the course of 2012–2018, and was charged with possession of child pornography. He was sentenced to 7 years and 9 months in prison.
