= Benjamín Castillo Plascencia =

Mexican Catholic bishop (1945–2026)

Most Reverend José Benjamín Castillo Plascencia
- Bishop Emeritus of Celaya
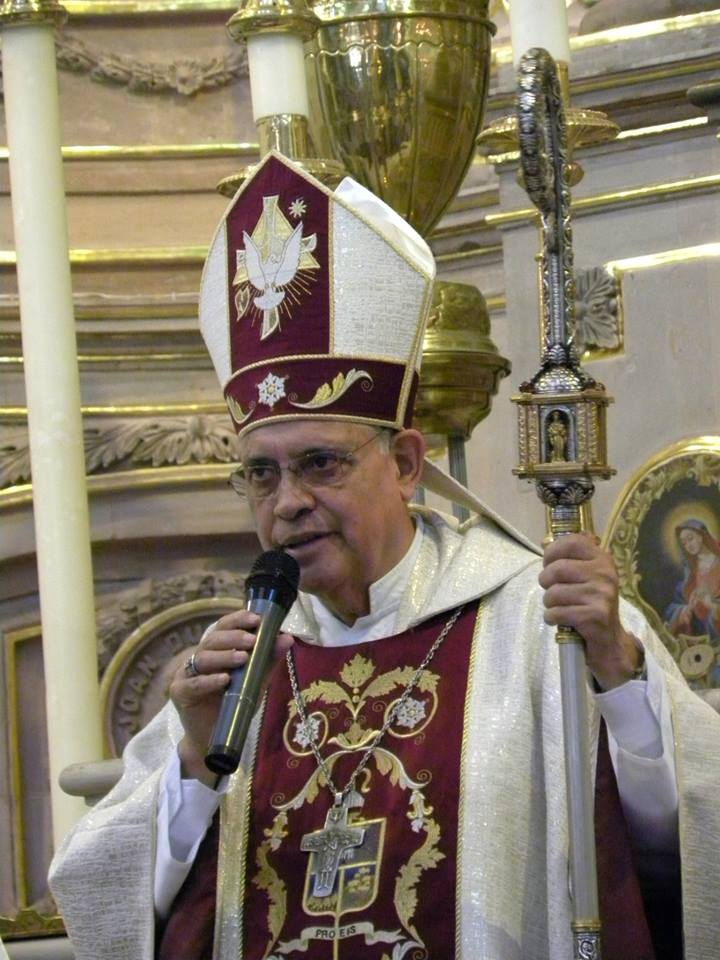
- Archdiocese: León
- Diocese: Celaya
- Installed: 29 April 2010
- Term ended: 12 June 2021
- Predecessor: Lázaro Pérez Jiménez
- Successor: Víctor Alejandro Aguilar Ledesma
- Other posts: Auxiliary Bishop of Guadalajara and Titular Bishop of Sufasar (1999–2003); Bishop of Tabasco (2003–2010)

Orders
- Ordination: 14 April 1974 by José Salazar López
- Consecration: 8 January 2000 by Juan Sandoval Íñiguez, Justo Mullor García and Javier Navarro Rodríguez
- Rank: Bishop

Personal details
- Born: 9 September 1945 Ixtlahuacán del Río, Jalisco, Mexico
- Died: 13 April 2026 (aged 80) Celaya, Guanajuato, Mexico

José Benjamín Castillo Plascencia (9 September 1945 – 13 April 2026) was a Mexican Roman Catholic prelate who served as the Bishop of the Diocese of Celaya from 2010 to 2021. He previously served as the Bishop of Tabasco (2003–2010) and as an auxiliary bishop of the Archdiocese of Guadalajara and titular bishop of Sufasar (1999–2003).

== Early life and education ==
José Benjamín Castillo Plascencia was born in Ixtlahuacán del Río, Jalisco, on 9 September 1945. He pursued his ecclesiastical studies at the Seminary of Guadalajara and was ordained a priest for the Archdiocese of Guadalajara on 14 April 1974 by Cardinal José Salazar López. He was later sent to Spain to study catechetical theology, where he earned a bachelor's degree from the Comillas Pontifical University and a Licentiate from the University of Salamanca.

== Episcopate ==
On 18 November 1999, Pope John Paul II appointed Castillo Plascencia to Auxiliary Bishop of Guadalajara and Titular Bishop of Sufasar. He received his episcopal consecration on 8 January 2000 from Cardinal Juan Sandoval Íñiguez.

On 8 February 2003, Castillo Plascencia was appointed as the 12th Bishop of the Diocese of Tabasco, succeeding Florencio Olvera Ochoa.

On 29 April 2010, Pope Benedict XVI transferred him to the Diocese of Celaya. In January 2020, he celebrated his 20th anniversary as a bishop.

On 12 June 2021, Pope Francis accepted Castillo Plascencia's resignation from the pastoral governance of the Diocese of Celaya upon reaching the age limit of 75.

== Death ==
Castillo Plascencia died in Celaya, Guanajuato, on 13 April 2026, at the age of 80.

Catholic Church titles
Preceded by Lázaro Pérez Jiménez	Bishop of Celaya; 2010–2021	Succeeded by Víctor Alejandro Aguilar Ledesma
Preceded by Florencio Olvera Ochoa	Bishop of Tabasco; 2003–2010	Succeeded by Gerardo de Jesús Rojas López
Preceded by André Vallée	Titular Bishop of Sufasar; 1999–2003	Succeeded by Claude Champagne
Preceded by —	Auxiliary Bishop of Guadalajara; 1999–2003	Succeeded by —
