= Kim Jong-soo =

Kim Jong-soo may refer to:

- Augustinus Kim Jong-soo (born 1956), South Korean Catholic prelate
- Kim Jong-soo (actor) (born 1964), South Korean actor
- Kim Jong-soo (footballer) (born 1986), South Korean footballer
