= Diocese of Celaya =

Roman Catholic diocese in Mexico

Coordinates: 20.5223°N 100.8119°W

Diocese of Celaya Dioecesis Celayensis Diócesis de Celaya

Location
- Country: Mexico
- Ecclesiastical province: Province of León
- Metropolitan: Celaya

Statistics
- Area: 3,386 sq mi (8,770 km^{2})
- Population: Total; Catholics: (as of 2007); 1,544,000; 1,403,000 (90.8%)
- Parishes: 65

Information
- Denomination: Roman Catholic
- Rite: Roman Rite
- Established: 13 October 1973 (52 years ago)
- Cathedral: Cathedral of the Most Pure Conception

Current leadership
- Pope: Leo XIV
- Bishop: Víctor Alejandro Aguilar Ledesma
- Metropolitan Archbishop: Alfonso Cortés Contreras

Map
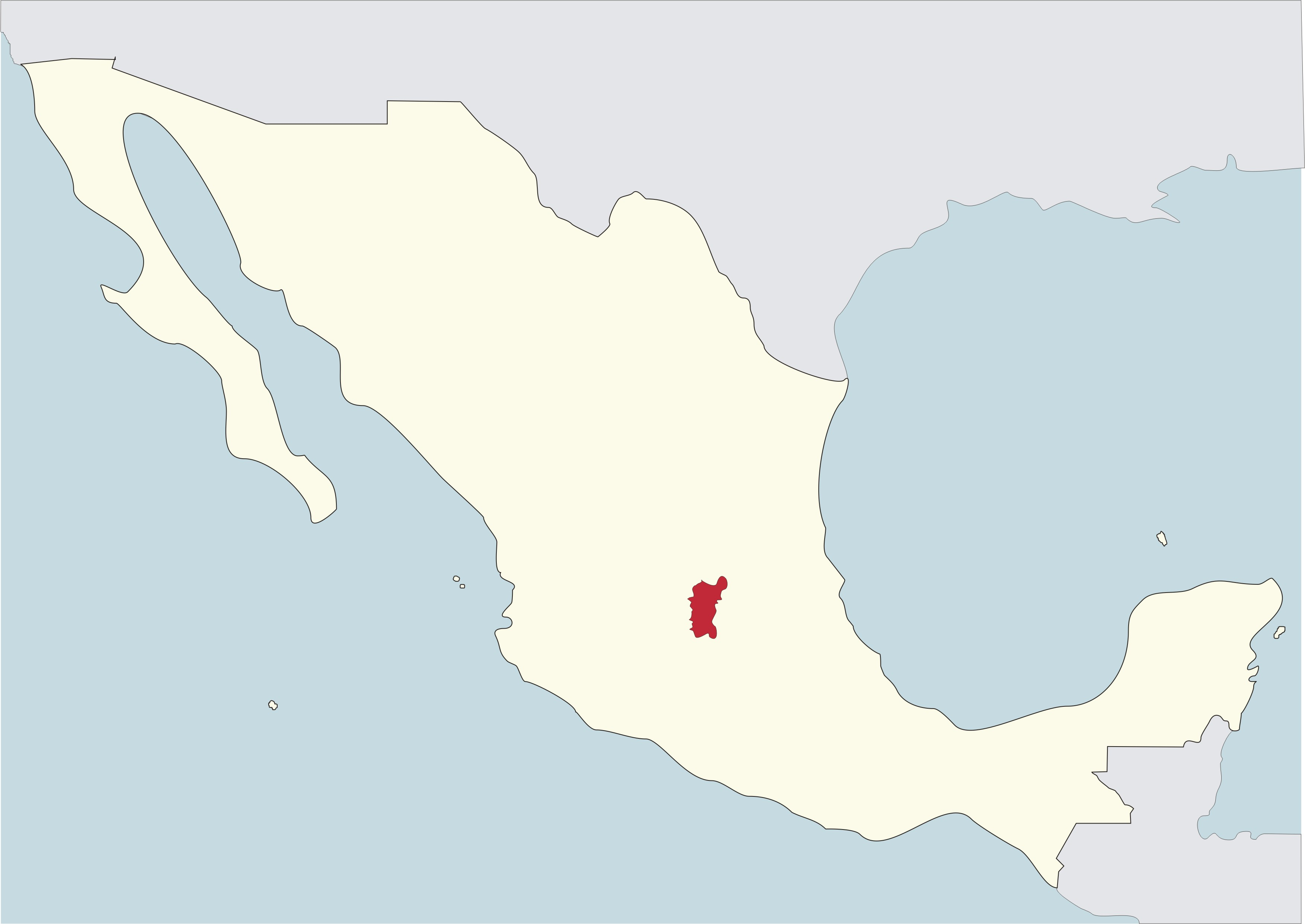

Website
- https://www.diocesisdecelaya.org

The Diocese of Celaya (Latin: Dioecesis Celayensis) (erected 13 October 1973) is a suffragan diocese of the Archdiocese of León. It was a suffragan of the Archdiocese of San Luis Potosí until 25 November 2006.

== Bishops ==
=== Ordinaries ===
- Victorino Alvarez Tena (1974–1987)
- Jesús Humberto Velázquez Garay (1988–2003)
- Lázaro Pérez Jiménez (2003–2009)
- Benjamín Castillo Plascencia (2010–2021)
- Víctor Alejandro Aguilar Ledesma (2021–present)

=== Another priest of this diocese who became bishop ===
- Gonzalo Alonso Calzada Guerrero, appointed Auxiliary Bishop of Antequera, Oaxaca in 2012

== Episcopal See ==
- Celaya, Guanajuato

== See also ==
- Immaculate Conception Cathedral, Celaya

== External links and references ==
- Diócesis de Celaya official site
- "Diocese of Celaya". Catholic-Hierarchy.
