= Bishop of Daejeon =

Bishop of Daejeon may refer to:

- The bishop of the Catholic Diocese of Daejeon, South Korea
- The bishop of the Anglican Diocese of Daejeon, South Korea

Note: despite the differences of spelling above, Daejeon and Taejeon are different variants of spelling of the same city in South Korea.
