= Augustinus Kim Jong-soo =

South Korean Catholic prelate (born 1956)

Most Reverend Augustinus Kim Jong-soo
- Bishop of Daejeon
- Church: Roman Catholic Church
- Diocese: Diocese of Daejeon
- In office: 26 February 2022
- Predecessor: Lazzaro You Heung-sik

Orders
- Ordination: 13 February 1989
- Consecration: 3 March 2009 by Joseph Kyeong Kap-ryong

Personal details
- Born: 8 February 1956 (age 70) Daeheung-dong, Daejeon, South Korea
- Motto: No Ego, Vivit In Me Christus

Augustinus Kim Jong-soo (Korean: 김종수; born 8 February 1956) is a South Korean prelate of the Catholic Church and the current Bishop of the Diocese of Daejeon.

== Biography ==
Kim was born in Daeheung-dong, Daejeon, South Korea and ordained a priest on 13 February 1989. On 10 February 2009, Pope Benedict XVI appointed him Auxiliary Bishop of Daejeon and Titular Bishop of Sufasar. On 3 March 2009, he was consecrated by Joseph Kyeong Kap-ryong, retired Bishop of Daejeon, with Lazarus You Heung-sik, and Cardinal Nicolas Cheong Jin-suk, Archbishop of Seoul, as co-consecrators.

Pope Francis appointed him Bishop of Daejeon on 26 February 2022.

Catholic Church titles
Preceded by Claude Champagne	— TITULAR — Titular Bishop of Sufasar; 10 February 2009 – 26 February 2022	Succeeded by Francisco Javier Acero Pérez
Preceded by Lazzaro You Heung-sik	Bishop of Daejeon; 26 February 2022 - present	Incumbent
