= Charles J. Chaput =

American Catholic prelate (born 1944)

His Excellency, The Most Reverend Charles J. Chaput OFMCap
- Archbishop Emeritus of Philadelphia
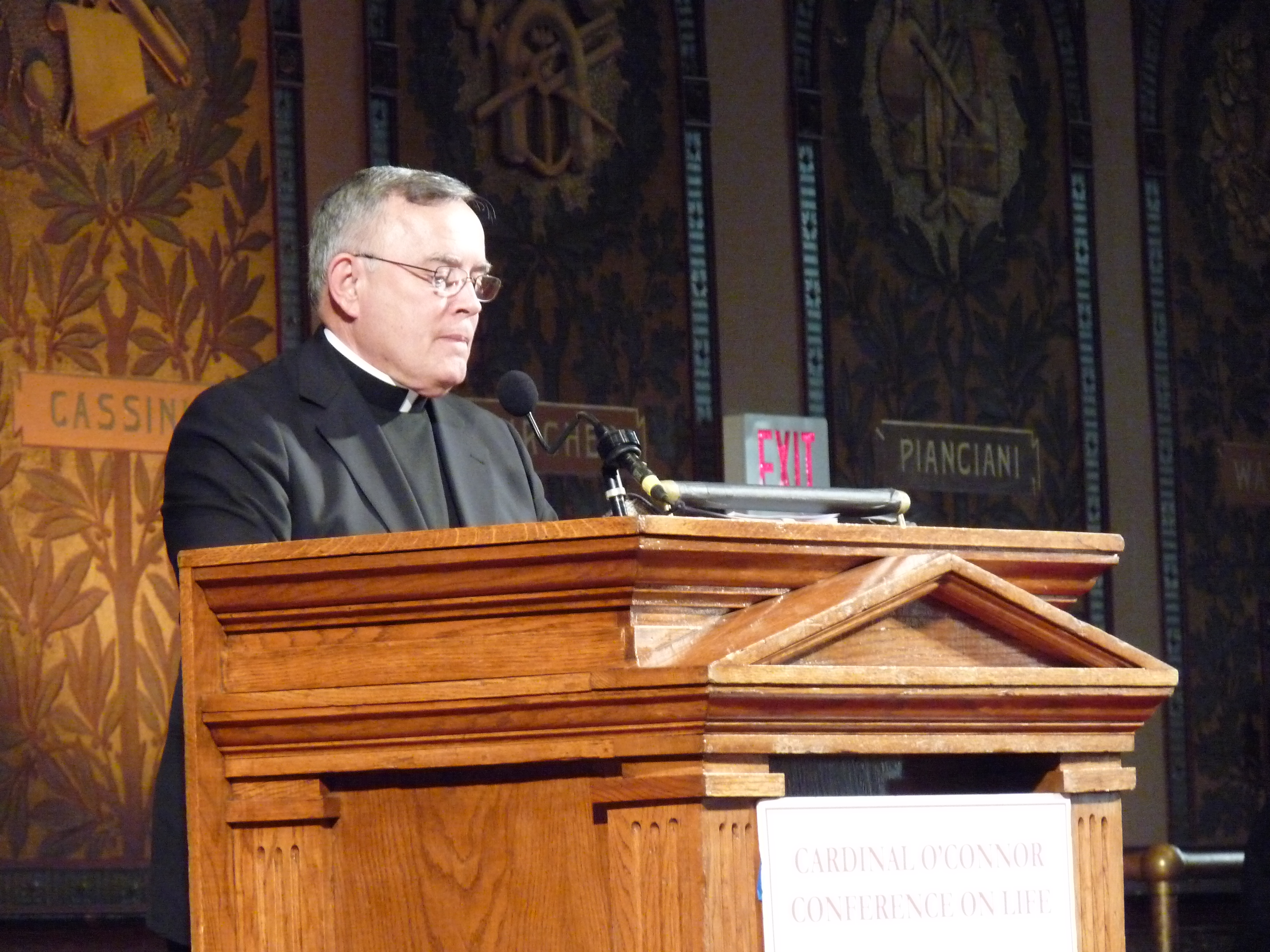
- Chaput at Georgetown University in 2012
- Church: Latin Church
- Archdiocese: Philadelphia
- Appointed: July 19, 2011
- Installed: September 8, 2011
- Retired: January 23, 2020
- Predecessor: Justin Francis Rigali
- Successor: Nelson J. Pérez
- Previous posts: Archbishop of Denver (1997‍–‍2011); Bishop of Rapid City (1988‍–‍1997)

Orders
- Ordination: August 29, 1970 by Cyril John Vogel
- Consecration: July 26, 1988 by Pio Laghi, John Roach, and James Stafford

Personal details
- Born: September 26, 1944 (age 82) Concordia, Kansas, US
- Motto: As Christ loved the church
- Styles
- Reference style: His Excellency; The Most Reverend
- Spoken style: Your Excellency
- Religious style: Archbishop

Ordination history
History
Priestly ordination
- Ordained by: Cyril John Vogel
- Date: August 29, 1970
Episcopal consecration
- Principal consecrator: Pío Laghi
- Co-consecrators: John Roach, James Stafford
- Date: July 26, 1988
Episcopal succession
Bishops consecrated by Charles J. Chaput as principal consecrator
- José Horacio Gómez: January 23, 2001
- James D. Conley: May 30, 2008
- Paul Etienne: December 9, 2009
- Fernando Isern: December 10, 2009
- Lawrence T. Persico: October 1, 2012
- Edward C. Malesic: July 13, 2015

Charles Joseph Chaput (/ˈʃæpjuː/ SHAP-yoo; born September 26, 1944) is an American Catholic prelate who served as Archbishop of Philadelphia from 2011 to 2020. He previously served as Archbishop of Denver (1997–2011) and Bishop of Rapid City (1988–1997). He was the first Archbishop of Philadelphia in 100 years who was not named a cardinal. Chaput is a professed Capuchin Franciscan, a member of the Prairie Band Potawatomi Nation in Kansas, the second Native American Catholic bishop, and the first such archbishop.

== Early life ==
Chaput was born on September 26, 1944, in Concordia, Kansas, one of three children of Joseph and Marian Helen (née DeMarais) Chaput. His father was a French Canadian who was descended from King Louis IX of France. His mother was a Native American of the Prairie Band Potawatomi tribe; his maternal grandmother was the last member of the family to live on a reservation. Chaput himself was enrolled in the tribe at a young age, taking the name Pietasa ("rustling wind"). His Potawatomi name is "the wind that rustles the leaves of the tree" while his Sioux name is "good eagle".

Chaput received his early education at Our Lady of Perpetual Help Grade School in Concordia. Deciding to become a priest at the age of 13, he attended St. Francis Seminary High School in Victoria, Kansas.

In 1965, at age 21, Chaput entered the Order of Friars Minor Capuchin, a branch of the Franciscans, in Pittsburgh, Pennsylvania. In 1967, he graduated with a bachelor's degree in philosophy from St. Fidelis College Seminary in Herman, Pennsylvania. As a seminarian, Chaput was an active volunteer in the 1968 US presidential campaign of US Senator Robert F. Kennedy. On July 14, 1968, he made his solemn profession as a Capuchin friar. In 1970, he graduated with a Master of Arts degree in religious education from Capuchin College in Washington, DC.

== Priesthood ==
Chaput was ordained to the priesthood for the Capuchin Order by Bishop Cyril Vogel on August 29, 1970. He received a Master of Theology degree from the University of San Francisco in 1971. From 1971 to 1974, he was an instructor in theology and spiritual director at St. Fidelis College. He then served as executive secretary and director of communications for the Capuchin province in Pittsburgh until 1977.

As a young priest, he supported the election of Georgia Governor Jimmy Carter as US president in 1976. Chaput was appointed pastor of Holy Cross Parish in Thornton, Colorado.

Chaput was elected vicar provincial for the Capuchin Province of Mid-America in 1977 and became secretary and treasurer for the province in 1980 and chief executive and provincial minister in 1983. He was part of a group of Native Americans who greeted Pope John Paul II when he visited Phoenix, Arizona, in 1987.

== Episcopal career ==
=== Bishop of Rapid City ===
Coat of arms as bishop of Rapid City

On April 11, 1988, Chaput was appointed bishop of Rapid City by John Paul II. He was consecrated on July 26, 1988, by Archbishop Pio Laghi, with Archbishop John Roach and Archbishop James Stafford serving as co-consecrators.

Chaput was the second priest of Native American ancestry to be consecrated a bishop in the United States, after Bishop Donald Pelotte. He was the first Native American to be consecrated as an ordinary bishop rather than a titular bishop. He chose as his episcopal motto: "As Christ Loved the Church" from Ephesians 5:25.

=== Archbishop of Denver ===
Coat of arms as bishop of Denver

On February 18, 1997, Chaput was appointed by John Paul II as archbishop of Denver, replacing Archbishop James Stafford. In 2007, Chaput delivered the commencement address at Denver's Augustine Institute. In 2008, he became the episcopal moderator of the Tekakwitha Conference, a ministry for Native American Catholics.

In 2007, Chaput conducted an apostolic visitation to the Diocese of Toowoomba in Queensland, Australia, on behalf of the Congregation for Bishops in Rome. The Vatican was concerned by statements that Bishop Bill Morris had made regarding the ordination of women. In May 2011, Pope Benedict XVI removed Morris as bishop of Toowoomba after he refused to resign.

Chaput was one of five bishops who conducted a Vatican-ordered investigation into the Legionaries of Christ in 2009 to 2010. The investigation was prompted by sexual abuse accusations against the group's founder, Reverend Marcial Maciel, whom the Vatican had removed from ministry in 2006

=== Archbishop of Philadelphia ===
On July 19, 2011, Chaput was appointed as archbishop of Philadelphia by Pope Benedict XVI. He succeeded Cardinal Justin Rigali, who had reached retirement age of 75 in April 2010. Chaput's strong record in handling cases of sexual abuse by priests was cited as a rationale for his appointment. He was installed on September 8, 2011.

From August 17 to 19, 2011, Chaput gave catechesis at the World Youth Day 2011 in Madrid, Spain, similar to the function he performed at the 2008 World Youth Day in Sydney. On November 14, 2014, at a meeting of the United States Conference of Catholic Bishops (USCCB), Chaput was elected as a delegate to the 2015 Synod of Bishops on the Family, pending Vatican approval. Though Chaput led a historically important see and his five immediate predecessors were cardinals, Benedict XVI did not appoint him a cardinal in his two 2012 consistories, nor did Pope Francis in any of his.

=== Retirement ===
Pope Francis accepted Chaput's letter of resignation as archbishop of Philadelphia on January 23, 2020. In August 2021, Chaput received the first annual Mother Angelica Award from EWTN Global Catholic Network.

== Views ==
=== Abortion ===
Regarding whether Catholic politicians who support legalized abortion should be denied communion, Chaput wrote in 2004 that, while denying anyone the Eucharist is a "very grave matter" that should be used only in "extraordinary cases of public scandal", those who are "living in serious sin or who deny the teachings of the Church" should voluntarily refrain from receiving communion.

The New York Times in 2004 reported that Chaput said it was sinful for Catholics to vote for Democratic US presidential nominee Senator John Kerry. He noted Kerry's views on abortion, among others. According to the Times, Chaput said that anyone voting for Kerry was "cooperating in evil" and needed "to go to confession". After the interview, Chaput criticized The New York Times for the way it allegedly construed his remarks. The archdiocese criticized the article as being "heavily truncated and framed" and posted a full transcript of it. He stopped responding to the paper's inquiries for six years, in part because he believed the Times had misrepresented him. Chaput was seen by some critics as "part of a group of bishops intent on throwing the weight of the Catholic Church into the elections". In public comments, his linkage of the eucharist to the policy stances of political candidates and their supporters were seen as a politicization of moral theology.

In a 2009 interview with Catholic News Agency, Chaput criticized a "spirit of adulation bordering on servility" toward President Barack Obama, remarking that "in democracies, we elect public servants, not messiahs". He said that Obama tried to mask his record on abortion and other issues with "rosy marketing about unity, hope, and change". Chaput also dismissed the notion that Obama was given a broad mandate, saying that he was elected to "fix an economic crisis" and not to "retool American culture on the issues of marriage and the family, sexuality, bioethics, religion in public life, and abortion".

Chaput in a 2012 interview with the Catholic News Service stated that absolute loyalty to the Church's teachings on core, bioethical, and natural law doctrinal issues must be a higher priority for Catholics than their identity as Americans, their party affiliation and agenda and the laws of their country; Chaput also argues that for a Catholic, loyalty to God is more important than any other identity. He says that the martyrs and confessors gave witness to this importance.

Chaput in September 2016 said that the 2016 American presidential election offered Americans the "worst choice in 50 years". In his view, both Donald Trump and former Secretary of State Hillary Clinton were "deeply flawed" candidates.

=== Gun control ===
Following the 2019 mass shootings in El Paso, Texas, and Dayton, Ohio, Chaput wrote that he supports background checks for purchasers of firearms, but added this comment:

Only a fool can believe that 'gun control' will solve the problem of mass violence. The people using the guns in these loathsome incidents are moral agents with twisted hearts. And the twisting is done by the culture of sexual anarchy, personal excess, political hatreds, intellectual dishonesty, and perverted freedoms that we've systematically created over the past half-century.

=== Homosexuality ===
In a 2011 interview with National Catholic Reporter, Chaput expressed his opposition same-sex marriage and questioned the upbringing of children of same-sex couples. He has said that same-sex couples cannot show children that their parents love each other in the same way that opposite-sex couples can.

In 2015, Chaput supported the dismissal of Margie Winters, the director of religious education at Waldron Mercy Academy in Merion Station, Pennsylvania. Winters had married her female partner in a civil marriage ceremony in 2007. When a parent reported their marriage to Waldron, Principal Nell Stetser asked Winters to resign; when she refused, the school did not renew her contract. Chaput said the school administrators had shown "character and common sense at a moment when both seem to be uncommon".

On October 4, 2018, at the Synod on Young People and Vocations in Rome, Chaput objected to the use of the terms "LGBT" or "LGBTQ" in church documents. He said:

"There is no such thing as an ‘LGBTQ Catholic' or a 'transgender Catholic' or even a 'heterosexual Catholic,' as if our sexual appetites defined who we are; as if these designations described discrete communities of differing but equal integrity within the real ecclesial community, the body of Jesus Christ."

=== Immigration reform ===
Chaput in 2013 advocated the reform of immigration laws to regularize the status of most undocumented immigrants as a moral imperative.

=== Politics ===
In his 2008 book Render unto Caesar: Serving the Nation by Living Our Catholic Beliefs in Political Life, Chaput exhorts Catholics to take a "more active, vocal, and morally consistent role" in the political process, arguing that private convictions cannot be separated from public actions without diminishing both. Rather than asking citizens to put aside their religious and moral beliefs for the sake of public policy, Chaput believed that American democracy depended upon a fully engaged citizenry, including religious believers, to function properly.

In 2020, Chaput said that public attacks on U.S. Supreme Court nominee Amy Coney Barrett reflected anti-Catholic bigotry. Some of the criticism had focused on Barrett's membership in the People of Praise, a charismatic ecumenical community.

=== Sexual abuse ===
Chaput has denounced what he sees as a lack of orthodoxy in the church. He accused past Catholic leaders of "ignorance, cowardice and laziness in forming young people to carry the faith into the future." On March 27, 2019, in a speech to Ohio seminarians, he blamed sexual abuse in the Catholic Church on "a pattern of predatory homosexuality and a failure to weed that out from church life".

== Public lectures ==
In 2014, Chaput delivered the twenty-seventh Erasmus Lecture, titled Strangers in a Strange Land, organized by First Things magazine and the Institute on Religion and Public Life. In his address, Chaput reflected on the challenges of living a Christian life in a post-Christian society, urging believers to remain faithful witnesses amid cultural and moral upheaval. His lecture anticipated themes he later developed in his 2017 book of the same name, emphasizing the need for courage, community, and clarity of faith in modern public life.

== See also ==
- Catholic Church in the United States
- Historical list of the Catholic bishops of the United States

Catholic Church titles
Preceded by Harold Joseph Dimmerling	Bishop of Rapid City; 1988–1997	Succeeded by Blase J. Cupich
Preceded by James Stafford	Archbishop of Denver; 1997–2011	Succeeded by Samuel J. Aquila
Preceded by Justin Francis Rigali	Archbishop of Philadelphia; 2011–2020	Succeeded by Nelson J. Perez
