= Adrien-Joseph Larribeau =

French Catholic priest (1883–1974)

Adrien-Joseph Larribeau MEP
- Bishop of Daejeon
- Church: Catholic Church
- Diocese: Diocese of Daejeon
- In office: 4 July 1958 – 6 November 1963
- Predecessor: Vicariate erected
- Successor: Peter Hoang Min Syeng
- Other post: Titular Bishop of Thinus (1963-1974)
- Previous posts: Titular Bishop of Dusa (1926-1962); Apostolic Vicar of Seoul (1933-1942); Coadjutor Apostolic Vicar of Seoul (1926-1933)

Orders
- Ordination: 10 March 1907
- Consecration: 1 May 1927 by Gustave Mutel

Personal details
- Born: 4 February 1883 La Romieu, Gers, France
- Died: 12 August 1974 (aged 91) Montbeton, Tarn-et-Garonne, France

Adrien-Joseph Larribeau (4 February 1883 – 12 August 1974) was a Catholic priest who was Bishop Emeritus of Daejeon.

== Career ==
Larribeau began his career in 1907 in the La Société des Missions Etrangères as an ordained priest, later that year he went on his mission to Korea. In 1926, he was appointed to Coadjutor Vicar Apostolic of Seoul, Korea. Also in 1926, he was appointed to the Titular Bishop of Dusa, being ordained the next year. With the Japanese occupation of Korea getting stricter he resigned from the Coadjutor Vicar Apostolic of Seoul in 1942. In 1958, he was appointed to the Vicar Apostolic of Daijeon. In 1962, he was appointed to the Bishop of Daejeon, the next year he retired. In 1963, he was appointed to the Bishop of Thinis. He died in 1974.
