= Peter Michael Muhich =

American Catholic prelate (1961–2024)

His Excellency, The Most Reverend Peter Michael Muhich
- Bishop of Rapid City
- Church: Catholic Church; Latin Church
- Province: Saint Paul and Minneapolis
- Diocese: Rapid City
- Appointed: May 12, 2020
- Installed: July 9, 2020
- Term ended: February 17, 2024
- Predecessor: Robert D. Gruss
- Successor: Scott E. Bullock

Orders
- Ordination: September 29, 1989 by Robert Henry Brom
- Consecration: July 9, 2020 by Bernard Hebda, Robert D. Gruss, and Donald DeGrood

Personal details
- Born: May 13, 1961 Eveleth, Minnesota, U.S.
- Died: February 17, 2024 (aged 62) Rapid City, South Dakota, US
- Education: Saint John Vianney College Seminary; American College of the Immaculate Conception
- Motto: Exemplum dedi vobis (Latin for 'I have given you an example')
- Styles
- Reference style: His Excellency; The Most Reverend
- Spoken style: Your Excellency
- Religious style: Bishop

Peter Michael Muhich (May 13, 1961 – February 17, 2024) was an American Catholic prelate who served as the Bishop of Rapid City in South Dakota from 2020 until his death in 2024.

== Biography ==
=== Early years ===
Muhich was born on May 13, 1961, to Louis and Sally Muhich in Eveleth, Minnesota, the second of seven children. He attended Eveleth High School. After his graduation in 1979, Muhich attended Saint John Vianney College Seminary in St. Paul, Minnesota. In 1983, Muhich went to Louvain, Belgium to attend the American College of the Immaculate Conception, where he completed his theological studies in 1989.

=== Priesthood ===
On September 29, 1989, Muhich was ordained to the priesthood at the Cathedral of Our Lady of the Rosary by Bishop Robert Henry Brom for the Diocese of Duluth. He served there in various pastoral roles for three decades.

=== Bishop of Rapid City ===
On May 12, 2020, Pope Francis appointed Muhich as bishop of Rapid City. He was ordained by Archbishop Bernard Hebda at the Cathedral of Our Lady of Perpetual Help in Rapid City on July 9, 2020.

On February 14, 2024, Muhich announced that he would be moving to hospice care due to cancer. Muhich died in Rapid City from esophageal cancer on February 17, 2024, at age 62.

== Episcopal succession ==
Catholic Church titles
Preceded by Robert D. Gruss	Bishop of Rapid City; 2020–2024	Succeeded by Scott E. Bullock
