= Jesús Humberto Velázquez Garay =

Mexican Roman Catholic bishop

Jesús Humberto Velázquez Garay (May 16, 1940 – June 22, 2013) was a Catholic bishop.

Ordained to the priesthood in 1964, he was named bishop in 1983. In 1988 he was appointed bishop of the Roman Catholic Diocese of Celaya and resigned in 2003.
