= Gesù Buon Pastore alla Montagnola =

- Church of Jesus the Good Shepherd at Montagnola
- Chiesa di Gesù Buon Pastore alla Montagnola
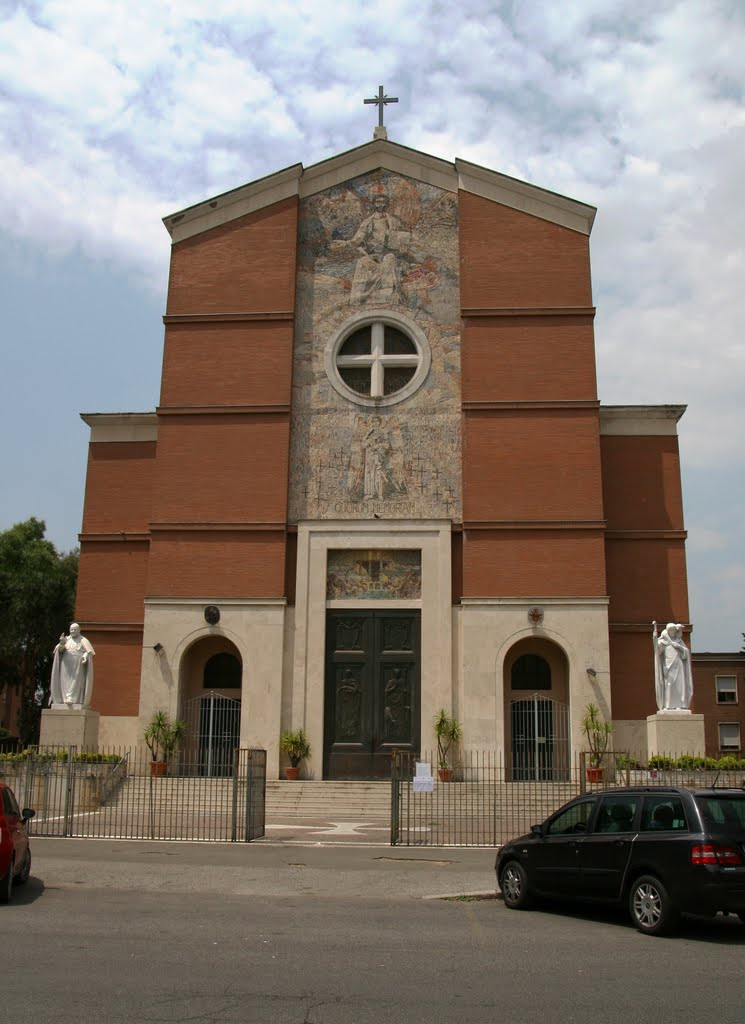

- Location within Rome
- 41°50′45″N 12°28′56″E
- Location: Via Luigi Perna, Rome
- Country: Italy
- Language: Italian
- Denomination: Catholic
- Tradition: Roman Rite
- Religious order: Order of Saint Paul the First Hermit
- Website: gesubuonpastore.it

History
- Status: titular church
- Dedication: Jesus (as the Good Shepherd)
- Dedicated: 18 March 1959

Architecture
- Architect: Carlo Bondini
- Groundbreaking: 1950
- Completed: 1957

Administration
- Diocese: Rome

Gesù Buon Pastore alla Montagnola is a titular church in Rome. It is located in via Luigi Perna.

Its parish was established by Pope Pius XI in 1937 and placed in the care of the Fathers of the Missionary Institute of the Pious Society of St Paul (known as the Paulini, not to be confused with the Paulists at Santa Susanna). The church itself was designed by Carlo Bondini and consecrated much later, on 18 March 1959 by Msgr. Luigi Traglia, and declared to be the "National church of victims of peace, of the fallen and of the victims of war". It is especially dedicated to the memory of the fallen in the Battle of Montagnola and Battle of Cecchignola, two battles against German forces in the Defence of Rome of 9–10 September 1943.

The interior has a canvas of The Good Shepherd, attributed by some to Carlo Dolci, and by others to Carlo Maratta.

== Cardinal-deacons ==
- Jozef Tomko (1985–1996)
- James Stafford (1998–2008)
- Velasio de Paolis (2010–2017)
- Lazarus You Heung-sik (2022–present)
