= Lazarus You Heung-sik =

South Korean Catholic cardinal

His Eminence Lazarus You Heung-sik
- Prefect of the Dicastery for the Clergy
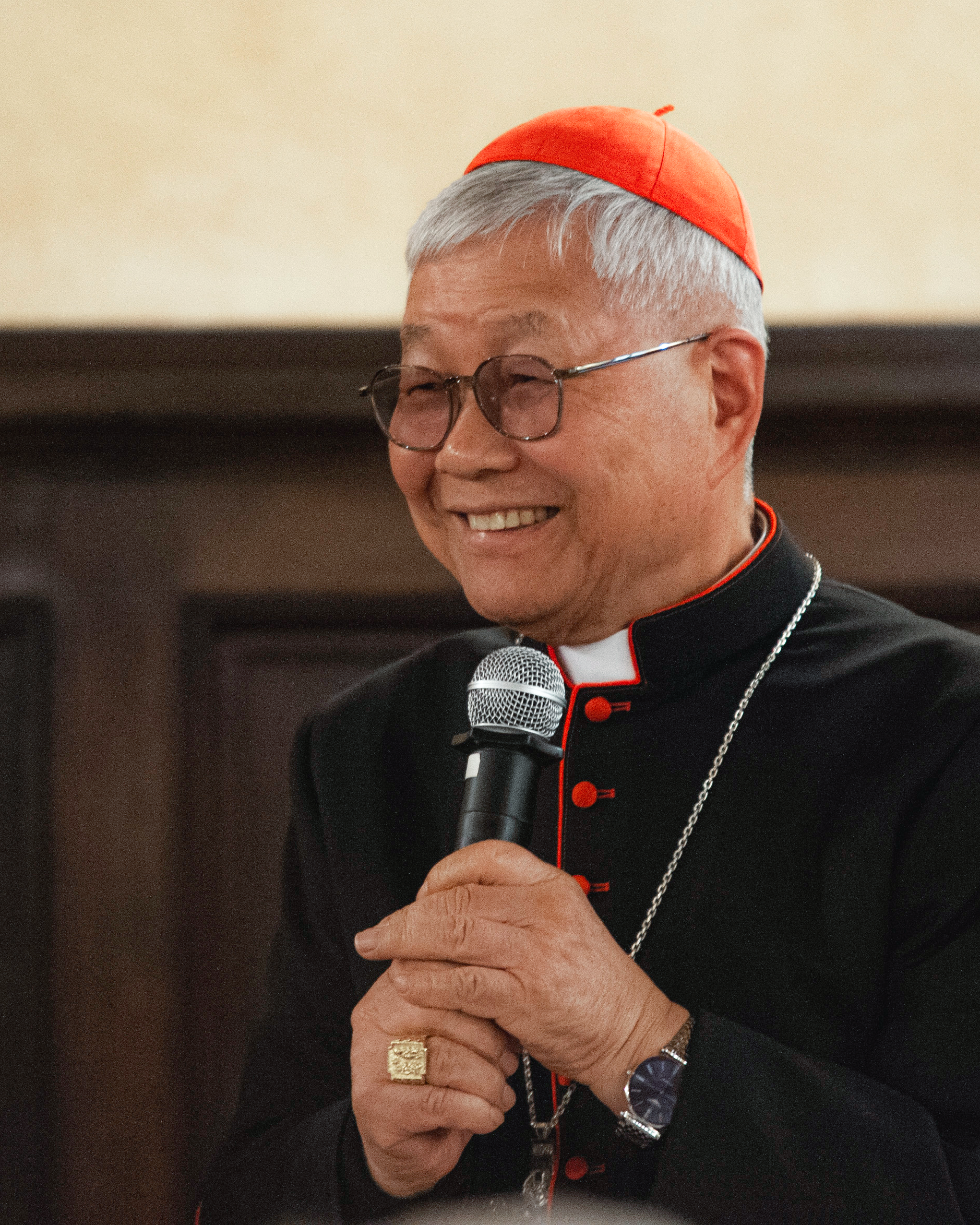
- Cardinal Lazarus You Heung-sik in 2023
- Church: Roman Catholic Church
- Installed: 2 August 2021
- Predecessor: Beniamino Stella
- Other post: Cardinal Deacon of Gesù Buon Pastore alla Montagnola (2022–present)
- Previous posts: President of the Catholic University of Daejeon (1998–2003); Coadjutor Bishop of Daejeon (2003–2005); Bishop of Daejeon (2005–2021)

Orders
- Ordination: 8 December 1979
- Consecration: 19 August 2003 by Joseph Kyeong Kap-ryong
- Created cardinal: 27 August 2022 by Pope Francis
- Rank: Cardinal deacon

Personal details
- Born: 17 November 1951 (age 74) Nonsan, South Korea
- Denomination: Roman Catholic
- Education: Catholic University of Korea; Lateranum
- Motto: Lux mundi (Latin for 'Light of the world'; John 8:12)
- Coat of arms

Korean name
- Hangul: 유흥식
- Hanja: 兪興植
- RR: Yu Heungsik
- MR: Yu Hŭngsik

Styles of Lazarus You Heung-sik
- Reference style: His Eminence
- Spoken style: Your Eminence
- Religious style: Cardinal
- Informal style: Cardinal

Lazarus You Heung-sik (or Lazzaro; Korean: 유흥식; born 17 November 1951) is a South Korean prelate of the Catholic Church who has served as Prefect of the Dicastery for the Clergy since 2021. He is the first Korean to head a department of the Roman Curia. He previously served as Bishop of Daejeon from 2005 to 2021, after two years as a coadjutor bishop under Bishop Joseph Kyeong Kap-ryong. You was created a cardinal by Pope Francis in 2022.

== Biography ==
You Heung-sik was born on 17 November 1951 in Nonsan, South Chungcheong, South Korea. He was baptized a Catholic at the age of sixteen. He studied first in Seoul at the Catholic University of Korea and then in Rome, where he earned a degree in dogmatic theology at the Pontifical Lateran University. He was ordained a priest on 9 December 1979.

His assignments included stints as an assistant priest at the diocesan cathedral, director of a retreat house, and director of an education center. Beginning in 1994, he worked as a spiritual director and professor at the Catholic University of Daejeon; he became its president from 1998 to 2003. He has been associated with the Focolare Movement and attended international gatherings of bishops who promote it.

On 9 July 2003, Pope John Paul II named him Bishop Coadjutor of the Diocese of Daejeon. He received his episcopal consecration on 19 August 2003 from Bishop Joseph Kyeong Kap-ryong of Daejeon. He became bishop upon the retirement of Kyeong on 1 April 2005.

On 29 May 2007, Pope Benedict XVI named him a member of the Pontifical Council Cor Unum. (Note: This membership ended when Cor Unum was absorbed into the new Dicastery for Promoting Integral Human Development in 2017.)

While bishop of Daejeon he has led several of the Catholic Bishops' Conference of Korea's committees, including those on migrants, youth ministry, and the promotion of the cause of Korean martyrs. (Note: Some large groups of Korean martyrs have been beatified or canonized. You's commission was tasked with two additional groups: 133 laypeople martyred in the late eighteenth century and 81 from the 21st century.) While serving as head of Caritas Korea from 2004 to 2008, You visited the North Korean capital of Pyongyang four times.

In 2014, his diocese hosted Pope Francis, who celebrated Mass in Daejeon World Cup Stadium, participated in Asian Youth Day, and met with Asian bishops. He participated in the 2018 Synod of Bishops on Youth and Discernment by papal appointment. He described the situation of young people in Korea: "Since childhood they grow up in a highly competitive society. Competition thwarts fraternal relations, it casts off friendships and nurtures loneliness." He took advantage of the synod to meet the two participating bishops from China. He expressed hope for peace on the Korean peninsula; he imagined an eventual papal visit to North Korea, but warned that it would require extensive preparations, "starting with the issue of religious freedom and the presence of priests". On 14 October 2020 he became secretary of the Korean Bishops Conference.

On 11 June 2021, Pope Francis appointed him to succeed Cardinal Beniamino Stella as prefect of the Congregation for the Clergy, with the date on which he takes office left unspecified. He was given the personal title of archbishop along with that of bishop emeritus of Daejeon. You subsequently moved to Rome and assumed his new post as the prefect on 2 August.

In February 2022, he participated in the San Damaso Ecclesiastical University of Madrid, Spain, with a conference in the fifth edition of the pastoral update sessions for priests.

On 29 May 2022, Pope Francis announced that he would elevate You to the rank of cardinal. On 27 August, Pope Francis made him a Cardinal-Deacon of Gesù Buon Pastore alla Montagnola.

On 13 July 2022, Pope Francis named him a member of the Dicastery for Bishops.

He participated as a cardinal elector in the 2025 papal conclave that elected Pope Leo XIV.

== See also ==
- Cardinals created by Pope Francis

== Notes ==
Educational offices
Preceded by Peter Kim Young-kyo	President of the Catholic University of Daejeon; 14 December 1998 – 20 August 2003	Succeeded by Marcus Lee Chang-duk
Catholic Church titles
Preceded by Joseph Kyeong Kap-ryong	Bishop of Daejeon; 1 April 2005 – 29 July 2021	Succeeded by Augustinus Kim Jong-soo
Preceded by Beniamino Stella	Prefect of the Dicastery for the Clergy; 2 August 2021 – present	Incumbent
Preceded by Velasio De Paolis	Cardinal Deacon of Gesù Buon Pastore alla Montagnola; 27 August 2022 – present	Incumbent
