= Sufasar =

Roman town in ancient North Africa

Coordinates: 36.196426°N 2.509668°E

Roman Empire - Mauretania Caesariensis (125 AD)

Sufasar was a Roman town, one of many in Roman North Africa. Sufasar faded with the Muslim conquest of the Maghreb. The site has been tentatively identified with ruins at Amourah in modern Algeria.

Sufasar was also the seat, of an ancient bishopric, Metropolitan of Caesarea Mauretaniae (modern Cherchell).

Its bishop, Urbanus, was one of the Catholic bishops whom the Arian Vandal king Huneric summoned to a conference in Carthage in 484 and then exiled.

== Bishopric ==
=== Titular see ===
- Gaston-Marie Jacquier (1960-1976)
- Stanislaw Adam Sygnet (1976-1985)
- André Vallée (1987-1996)
- José Benjamín Castillo Plascencia (1999-2003)
- Claude Champagne (2003-2009)
- Augustinus Kim Jong-soo (2009-2022)
- Francisco Javier Acero Pérez (2022-present)
