= Velasio de Paolis =

Catholic cardinal

His Eminence Velasio de Paolis, C.S. JCD, STL
- President of the Prefecture for the Economic Affairs of the Holy See
- Appointed: 12 April 2008
- Term ended: 21 September 2011
- Predecessor: Sergio Sebastiani
- Successor: Giuseppe Versaldi
- Other post: Cardinal-Deacon of Gesù Buon Pastore alla Montagnola
- Previous posts: Titular Bishop of Thélepte (2003–2010); Secretary of the Apostolic Signatura (2003–2008)

Orders
- Ordination: 18 March 1961
- Consecration: 21 February 2004 by Angelo Sodano
- Created cardinal: 20 November 2010 by Pope Benedict XVI
- Rank: Cardinal-Deacon

Personal details
- Born: 19 September 1935 Sonnino, Kingdom of Italy
- Died: 9 September 2017 (aged 81) Rome, Italy
- Denomination: Roman Catholic
- Coat of arms

Styles of Velasio de Paolis
- Reference style: His Eminence
- Spoken style: Your Eminence
- Informal style: Cardinal

Velasio de Paolis, C.S., JCD, STL (19 September 1935 – 9 September 2017), was an Italian member of the Missionaries of St. Charles Borromeo (Scalabrinians) and a cardinal of the Catholic Church. He was President of the Prefecture for the Economic Affairs of the Holy See and Pontifical Delegate for the religious institute of the Legionaries of Christ.

== Early life ==
De Paolis was born in 1935 in Sonnino, Latina, and took his final vows as a member of the Missionaries of St. Charles Borromeo (Scalabrinians) on 4 October 1958.

He completed his studies in Rome and received his doctorate in canon law from the Pontifical Gregorian University, a licentiate in theology from the faculty of theology at the Pontifical University of Saint Thomas Aquinas, Angelicum, and a law degree from La Sapienza University. He was ordained to the priesthood on 18 March 1961 and after 1971 taught canon law at the Pontifical Gregorian University. In 1987 he became professor of canon law at the Pontifical Urban University, where he became dean in 1998.

== Curial service ==
On 30 December 2003, De Paolis was appointed Secretary of the Apostolic Signatura and Titular Bishop of Thelepte by Pope John Paul II. He received his episcopal consecration on 21 February 2004 from Cardinal Angelo Sodano, with Archbishop Silvano Maria Tomasi, CS, and Bishop Francesco Saverio Salerno serving as co-consecrators. In response to the murder of two priests in Turkey and Nigeria, he declared, "Enough now with this turning the other cheek! It's our duty to protect ourselves...The West has had relations with the Arab countries for half a century, mostly for oil, and has not been able to get the slightest concession on human rights."

De Paolis was named President of the Prefecture for the Economic Affairs of the Holy See by Pope Benedict XVI on 12 April 2008, also being promoted to Titular Archbishop of Thelepte. As President, he essentially served as the chief auditor for the Vatican.

Refusing to allow the film adaption of Dan Brown's novel Angels & Demons to be filmed at churches in Rome, De Paolis said that Brown had "turned the gospels upside down to poison the faith...It would be unacceptable to transform churches into film sets so that his blasphemous novels can be made into films in the name of business." He also said that Brown's work "wounds common religious feelings."

On 25 January 2010 he was appointed a member of the Apostolic Signatura, the Church's highest court, in addition to his duties at the Prefecture for the Economic Affairs of the Holy See. On 29 December 2010 he was appointed a member of the Congregation for Divine Worship and the Discipline of the Sacraments, and the Pontifical Council for Legislative Texts. He held these memberships until his 80th birthday.

He was created Cardinal-Deacon with the title of Gesù Buon Pastore alla Montagnola by Pope Benedict XVI in the consistory of 20 November 2010. On 4 May 2011, Pope Benedict appointed him a member of the Congregation for the Causes of Saints, on which he served until he reached the mandatory retirement age of 80 in 2015.

Pope Benedict XVI accepted De Paolis' resignation as president of the Prefecture for the Economic Affairs on 21 September 2011.

He was one of the cardinal electors who participated in the 2013 papal conclave that elected Pope Francis. He called Cardinal Roger Mahony's participation in the conclave "troubling," but noted that Mahony "has the right and duty to take part", and "the rules must be followed". Mahony had recently been rebuked by his successor, Archbishop Jose Gomez, for his handling of sexual abuse cases, although Gomez also expressed support for Mahony's participation in the papal conclave.

=== Pontifical Delegate for the Legionaries of Christ ===
On 9 July 2010, Pope Benedict appointed de Paolis as Pontifical Delegate for the Congregation of the Legionaries of Christ, after the alleged abuses by its founder became public and were admitted by the congregation.

In October of the same year, De Paolis suggested that the Legion should redefine its mission and its governing structure. He acknowledged that questions remained about how much other Legion leaders knew about Maciel's abuses and that finding the truth is "not that simple". Plans were made for a renewal process that could take three years or more. He and four advisers would work with Legion officials to revise the congregation's constitution, and consideration was being given to appointing a committee to address complaints made against the Legion and a committee to address financial management issues in the congregation. The process would include an investigation, headed by Archbishop Ricardo Blazquez of Valladolid in Valladolid, Spain, of the lay branch of the congregation, known as Regnum Christi.

On 20 October 2011, de Paolis disclosed, in a letter, that an investigation of Regnum Christi uncovered concerns that would require rewriting the group's norms. Vatican officials expressed concern that the consecrated members of Regnum Christi were overly subject to the Legion; they called for their own structure of authority while keeping close ties to the Legion. De Paolis said that “the issues regarding personal and community life that have emerged from this same visitation on an institutional level initially appear to be many and challenging.” He indicated, however, that Regnum Christi would continue its affiliation with the Legion of Christ, but that the lay group would be split from the Legion itself.

In a 21 November 2011 letter, de Paolis asked the consecrated in Regnum Christi to edit their core set of norms, and ruled inoperative a more extensive set of norms. The core set of norms (128 in number) were approved by the Vatican in 2004, not the more extensive ones (over 1,000 in number). He said a small commission would be formed soon to extract from the more extensive rules only those that are strictly necessary for their life and governance.

In 2014 de Paolis said one of the "key points" in the redrafted constitution is a "clearer and more accurate distinction between the internal forum and the external forum, and between the sacramental forum and – let us say – the disciplinary, external forum." The reference seemed to indicate that the revised constitution would permit Legionaries to choose their own confessors, removing a requirement that they confess only to priests chosen by superiors. He said drafters of the new constitution had found it necessary to "reaffirm that authority is not arbitrary but must operate within a council."

==== Handling ====
On 26 October 2011 it was reported that disillusioned members were leaving the order as they lose faith that the Vatican will push through the necessary changes. De Paolis said in an interview that Pope Benedict tasked him only with guiding the Legion and helping rewrite its norms – not "decapitating" its leadership or avenging wrongdoing. De Paolis ruled out any further investigation into the crimes of Marciel Maciel. He added, "I don't see what good would be served" by further inquiry into a coverup. "Rather, we would run the risk of finding ourselves in an intrigue with no end. Because these are things that are too private for me to go investigating." Reports estimate 70 of the 890 Legion priests and upwards of a third of the movement's 900 consecrated women have left or are taking time away to ponder their future. De Paolis defended his commitment and approach to the reform, saying he had "inserted" himself into the Legion's administration, expanded the Legion's governing council, and shuffled some superiors around. He said he hasn't dismissed any superiors outright because he needs them to learn the complex details of the order's structure, culture and finances. He said his priority was to persuade the Legion's leaders to sow change from within.

=== Vatileaks scandal ===
In October 2012, de Paolis told the Italian newspaper La Repubblica that there was precedent for the Pope to pardon Paolo Gabriele, who had been found guilty of stealing confidential papal documents and leaking them to the media. Asked whether Gabriele would be jailed or pardoned, de Paolis said only the Pope could decide, but he added: "I feel I can say that, with a full confession of honest remorse and the absolute certainty that the crime cannot be committed again, popes have always issued, in favour of the condemned, measures dictated by the mercy that is the essence of the Church, which is always close to her children, even those found guilty."

== Death ==
He died in Rome on 9 September 2017, 10 days short of his 82nd birthday.

Catholic Church titles
Preceded by Jean-Louis Pierre Tauran	— TITULAR — Titular Bishop of Thélepte; 30 December 2003 – 20 November 2010	Succeeded by Edgar Peña Parra
Preceded by Sergio Sebastiani	President of the Prefecture for the Economic Affairs of the Holy See; 12 April 2008 – 21 September 2011	Succeeded by Giuseppe Versaldi
Preceded by James Francis Stafford	Cardinal Deacon of Gesù Buon Pastore alla Montagnola; 20 November 2010 – 9 September 2017	Succeeded by Lazzaro You Heung-sik
