= James Stafford =

Catholic cardinal

His Eminence James Stafford
- Major Penitentiary Emeritus of the Apostolic Penitentiary; Archbishop Emeritus of Denver
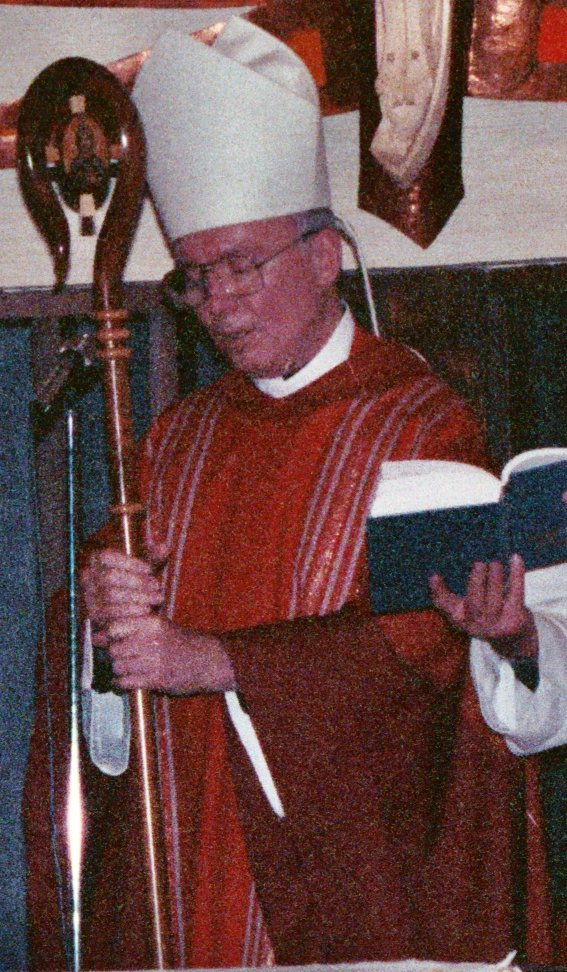
- Archdiocese: Denver
- Installed: October 4, 2003
- Retired: June 2, 2009
- Predecessor: Luigi De Magistris (Major Penitentiary) and James Vincent Casey (Denver)
- Successor: Fortunato Baldelli (Major Penitentiary) and Charles J. Chaput (Denver)
- Other post: Cardinal Priest of San Pietro in Montorio
- Previous posts: President of the Pontifical Council for the Laity (1996–2003); Archbishop of Denver (1986–1996); Bishop of Memphis (1982–1986); Auxiliary Bishop of Baltimore and Titular Bishop of Respecta (1976–1982)

Orders
- Ordination: December 15, 1957 by Martin John O'Connor
- Consecration: February 29, 1976 by William Donald Borders, Lawrence Shehan, and Thomas Austin Murphy
- Created cardinal: February 21, 1998 by Pope John Paul II
- Rank: Cardinal-Priest

Personal details
- Born: July 26, 1932 (age 94) Baltimore, Maryland, US
- Denomination: Catholic
- Motto: In principium erat verbum (In the beginning was the word)

Styles of James Francis Stafford
- Reference style: His Eminence
- Spoken style: Your Eminence
- Religious style: Cardinal
- Informal style: Cardinal
- See: Denver (Emeritus)

James Francis Stafford (born July 26, 1932) is an American cardinal of the Roman Catholic Church. He served as major penitentiary of the Apostolic Penitentiary from 2003 to 2009.

Stafford previously served as president of the Pontifical Council for the Laity (1996–2003), archbishop of the Archdiocese of Denver (1986–1996), bishop of the Diocese of Memphis (1982–1986), and as an auxiliary bishop of the Archdiocese of Baltimore (1976–1982). Stafford was made a cardinal by Pope John Paul II in 1998.

== Biography ==
=== Early life ===
James Stafford was born on July 26, 1932, in Baltimore, Maryland, the only child of Francis Emmett and Mary Dorothy (née Stanton) Stafford. Francis Stafford was the owner of a furniture store, opened by his grandfather in 1902. James Stafford was raised in Irvington, a Baltimore neighborhood, and graduated from Loyola High School in Towson, Maryland, in 1950.

Stafford then entered Loyola College Maryland in Baltimore, planning a career in medicine. However, in 1952, the death of a close friend in a car crash caused Stafford to rethink his future and to enter St. Mary's Seminary in Baltimore. Stafford attended St. Mary's Seminary for two years. Archbishop Francis Keough then sent him to Rome to the Pontifical North American College, where he attended the Pontifical Gregorian University.

=== Priesthood ===
While in Rome, Stafford was ordained to the priesthood for the Archdiocese of Baltimore by Bishop Martin O'Connor on December 15, 1957. He earned a Licentiate of Sacred Theology from the Gregorian University in 1958.

After his return to Baltimore, Stafford was assigned as an assistant pastor at the Immaculate Heart of Mary Parish, remaining there until 1962. He then entered the Catholic University of America in Washington, D.C., where he earned a Master of Social Work degree in 1964 with a thesis on the foster care of children.

From 1964 to 1966, Stafford served as assistant director of the archdiocesan Catholic Charities and assistant pastor of St. Ann Parish in Baltimore. He was named in 1966 as director of the archdiocesan branch of Catholic Charities by Cardinal Lawrence Shehan, serving in that position for ten years.

In 1970, Pope Paul VI named Stafford as a chaplain of his holiness. He was elected president of the presbyteral senate for the archdiocese the following year. Stafford also helped reorganize the central services of the archdiocese and create its collegial structures.

=== Auxiliary Bishop of Baltimore ===
On January 11, 1976, Paul VI appointed Stafford as an auxiliary bishop of Baltimore and titular bishop of Respecta. He was consecrated on February 29, 1976, by Archbishop William Borders, with Shehan and Bishop Thomas Murphy serving as co-consecrators, at the Cathedral of Mary Our Queen in Baltimore. Stafford selected as his episcopal motto: In principium erat Verbum, which is Latin for: "In the beginning was the Word" (John 1:1).

As an auxiliary bishop, Stafford served as vicar general of the archdiocese from 1976 to 1981. From 1978 to 1984, he led the U.S. Conference of Catholic Bishops (USCCB) Commission on Marriage and Family Life. He also served as administrator of Sts. Philip and James Parish in Baltimore (1980–1981). Stafford attended the Fifth Ordinary Assembly of the Synod of Bishops in Vatican City from September to October 1980.

=== Bishop of Memphis ===
On November 17, 1981, Pope John Paul II appointed Stafford as the second bishop of Memphis. He was installed on January 17, 1982. During his tenure, Stafford revised the structure of the pastoral office, improved the fiscal conditions of the diocese, and concentrated on the evangelization of African Americans.

In addition to his duties in Memphis, Stafford was chairman of the USCCB Commission for Ecumenical and Interreligious Affairs (1984–1991) and co-president of the Dialogue between Roman Catholics and Lutherans (1984–1997).

=== Archbishop of Denver ===
Coat of arms as bishop of Denver

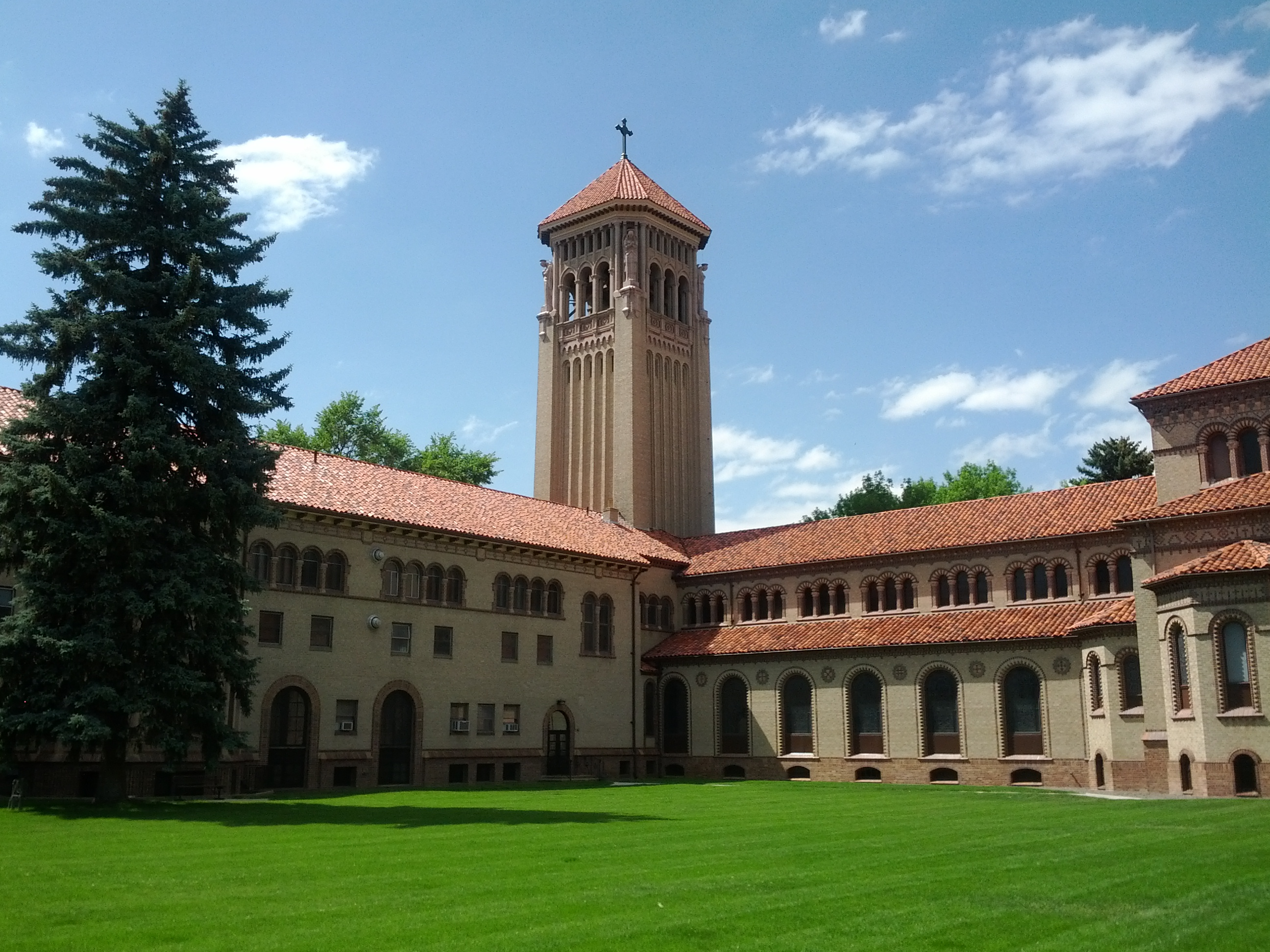
St. John Vianney Theological Seminary, Denver, Colorado (2012)

Following the death of Archbishop James Casey, John Paul II appointed Stafford as the third archbishop of Denver on June 3, 1986. He was installed at the Cathedral of the Immaculate Conception in Denver, Colorado, on July 30, 1986.

In 1990, the Vincentian Fathers announced the closing in 1994 of St. Thomas Seminary in Denver due to falling enrollment. Stafford decided to buy the seminary property and plan a brand new institution, St. John Vianney Theological Seminary. The new facility opened in 1999 under Stafford's successor, Archbishop Charles Chaput.

In a July 28, 2005 article in the Denver Post. five men described being fondled as boys during the 1960s by Reverend Harold Robert White. In August 1983, one of the men wrote to Stafford complaining about White. A response letter from the archdiocese said that White was to "...receive an evaluation from competent personnel to determine whether there are any recurring difficulties.” White continued to work in parish ministry until 1993; he was laicized in 2004.

During his tenure in Denver, Stafford hosted the 1993 World Youth Day, the first such event in the United States. In his last year as archbishop, he launched the first capital campaign in forty years and a "Strategic Plan" for Catholic schools.

=== Roman Curia ===
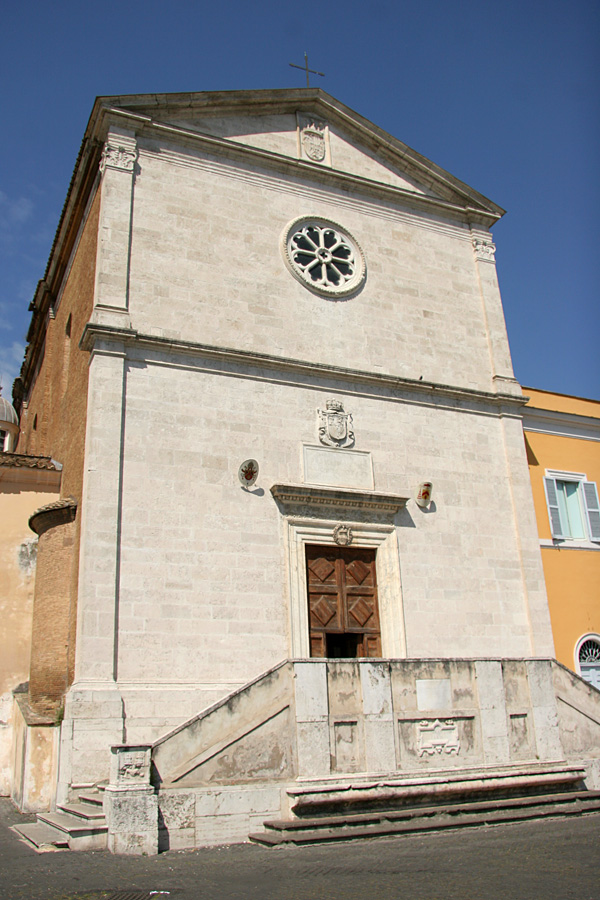
Church of San Pietro in Montorio, Rome, Italy (2014)

Stafford was appointed by John Paul II as president of the Pontifical Council for the Laity on August 20, 1996. Stafford was created cardinal-deacon of Gesù Buon Pastore alla Montagnola Parish in Rome in the consistory of 1998.

In 2003, Stafford was appointed major penitentiary, overseeing matters pertaining to indulgences and the internal forum of the Catholic Church. He was one the highest ranking American members of the Roman Curia and the second one in that role. Stafford participated in the 2005 papal conclave that selected Pope Benedict XVI.

Stafford submitted his letter of resignation to Benedict XVI on his 75th birthday in 2007. On June 2, 2009, Benedict XVI appointed as his successor Archbishop Fortunato Baldelli, then apostolic nuncio to France.

On March 1, 2008, Stafford took the option, after ten years as a cardinal deacon, for promotion to the rank of cardinal-priest, and was assigned the titular church of San Pietro in Montorio. In 2009, he was awarded an honorary doctorate by the Dominican School of Philosophy and Theology and inducted into their College of Fellows.

== Political views ==
The National Catholic Reporter reported on November 19, 2008, that Stafford had criticized US President-elect Barack Obama, saying he has "an agenda and vision that are aggressive, disruptive and apocalyptic". The story was first reported by The Tower, the student newspaper of the Catholic University of America, where Stafford made those remarks.

Saying that the United States experienced a "cultural earthquake" when Obama was elected president, Stafford said the president-elect "appears to be a relaxed, smiling man" with rhetorical skills that are "very highly developed". "But under all that grace and charm, there is a tautness of will, a state of constant alertness, to attack and resist any external influence that might affect his will", he added. Stafford then predicted that the Obama administration would compare to "Jesus' agony in the Garden of Gethsemane".

The Catholic News Agency revealed more details about Stafford's remarks that same week: "If 1968 was the year of America's 'suicide attempt,' 2008 is the year of America's exhaustion," he said, contrasting the year of publication of Humanae vitae with this election year. "For the next few years, Gethsemane will not be marginal. We will know that garden," Stafford told his audience. Catholics who weep the "hot, angry tears of betrayal" should try to identify with Jesus, who during his agony in the garden was "sick because of love".

Stafford also attributed America's so-called decline to US Supreme Court decisions such as the 1973 ruling in Roe v. Wade, which Stafford claims imposed "permissive abortion laws nationwide".

== See also ==
- American bishops serving outside the United States
- Catholic Church hierarchy
- Catholic Church in the United States
- Historical list of the Catholic bishops of the United States
- List of Catholic bishops of the United States
- Lists of patriarchs, archbishops, and bishops

Catholic Church titles
Preceded by Alexis Phạm Văn Lộc	— TITULAR — Titular Bishop of Respecta; 19 January 1976 – 17 November 1982	Succeeded by Cornelius de Wit
Preceded by Carroll Thomas Dozier	Bishop of Memphis; 17 November 1982 – 30 May 1986	Succeeded by Daniel Mark Buechlein
Preceded by James Vincent Casey	Archbishop of Denver; 30 May 1986 – 20 August 1996	Succeeded by Charles Joseph Chaput
Preceded by Eduardo Francisco Pironio	President of the Pontifical Council for the Laity; 20 August 1996 – 4 October 2003	Succeeded by Stanisław Ryłko
Preceded by Jozef Tomko	Cardinal Deacon of Gesù Buon Pastore alla Montagnola; 21 February 1998 – 1 March 2008	Succeeded by Velasio De Paolis
Preceded by Luigi De Magistris	Major Penitentiary of the Apostolic Penitentiary; 4 October 2003 – 2 June 2009	Succeeded by Fortunato Baldelli
Preceded by Aloísio Lorscheider	Cardinal Priest of San Pietro in Montorio; 1 March 2008 –	Incumbent
