= St. Thomas More High School (South Dakota) =

Private school in Rapid City, South Dakota, United States

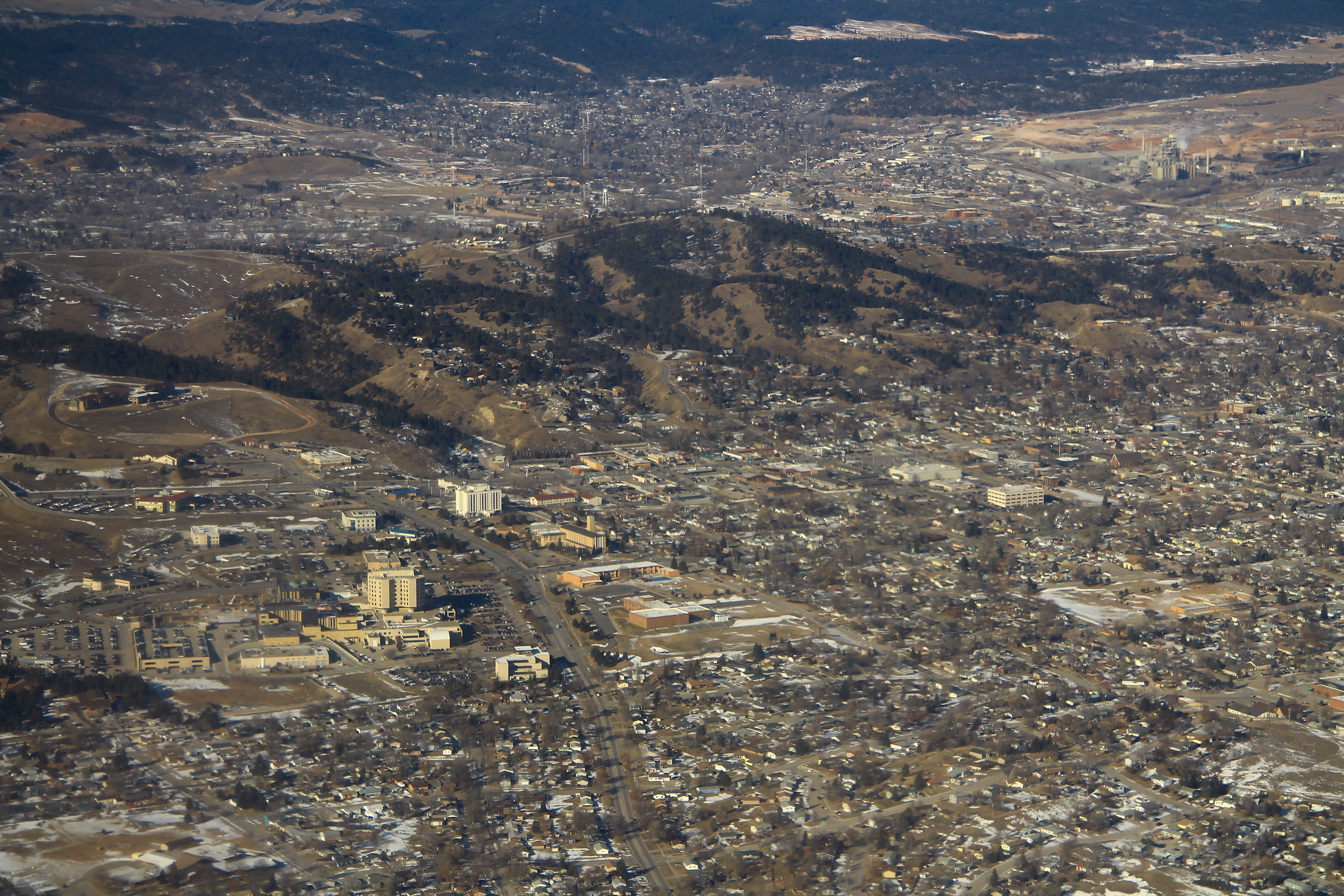
- Aerial view of the school & surrounding area

Location
- 300 Fairmont Boulevard; Rapid City, (Pennington County), South Dakota 57701; United States; 44°3′33″N 103°13′25″W

Information
- Type: Private, Coeducational
- Religious affiliation: Roman Catholic
- Established: 1991
- Principal: Mary Helen Olsen
- Grades: 9–12
- Athletics conference: Black Hills Conference
- Affiliation: Diocese of Rapid City
- Website: www.rccss.org/apps/pages/index.jsp?uREC_ID=4474522&type=d&pREC_ID=2752556

St. Thomas More High School is a private, Roman Catholic high school in Rapid City, South Dakota. It is a part of the Rapid City Catholic School System.
