= Harold Joseph Dimmerling =

His Excellency, The Most Reverend Harold Joseph Dimmerling
- Bishop of Rapid City
- Church: Roman Catholic Church
- See: Diocese of Rapid City
- Predecessor: William Tibertus McCarty
- Successor: Charles Joseph Chaput

Orders
- Ordination: May 2, 1940 by Richard Thomas Guilfoyle
- Consecration: October 30, 1969 by George Speltz

Personal details
- Born: September 23, 1914 Braddock, Pennsylvania, US
- Died: December 13, 1987 (aged 73) Rapid City, South Dakota, US
- Motto: Keep the faith
- Coat of arms

Harold Joseph Dimmerling (September 23, 1914 – December 13, 1987) was an American prelate of the Roman Catholic Church. He served as bishop of the Diocese of Rapid City in South Dakota from 1969 until his death in 1987.

In 2018, the Diocese of Saint Cloud announced that it had credible accusations of sexual abuse against Dimmerling.

== Biography ==
=== Early life ===
Joseph Dimmerling was born on September 23, 1914, in Braddock, Pennsylvania. He was ordained to the priesthood in Altoona, Pennsylvania, for the Diocese of Saint Cloud on May 2, 1940 by Bishop Richard Thomas Guilfoyle After his ordination, Dimmerling served in pastoral assignments in St. Cloud, Breckenridge, Brushvale, Glenwood, Villard, and Little Falls, all in Minnesota. He also served at the seminary at Collegeville, Minnesota.

=== Bishop of Rapid City ===
On September 11, 1969, Pope Paul VI appointed Dimmerling as bishop of Rapid City. He was ordained bishop by Bishop George Speltz on October 30, 1969. Dimmerling established a permanent diaconate program and a lay ministry program and ordained the first Native American deacon in the country.

Dimmerling started offices in the diocese for rural life, stewardship and social concerns. He set up a ministry for people who were separated or divorced, and for widows. He also established the West River Catholic newspaper.

Joseph Dimmerling died in Rapid City on December 13, 1987. In November 2018, the Diocese of Saint Cloud announced that it had credible accusations of sexual abuse of a minor against Dimmerling from his tenure as a priest in the diocese.

Catholic Church titles
Preceded by William Tibertus McCarty	Bishop of Rapid City; 1969—1987	Succeeded by Charles Joseph Chaput
