= Sonnino =

- Comune
- Comune di Sonnino
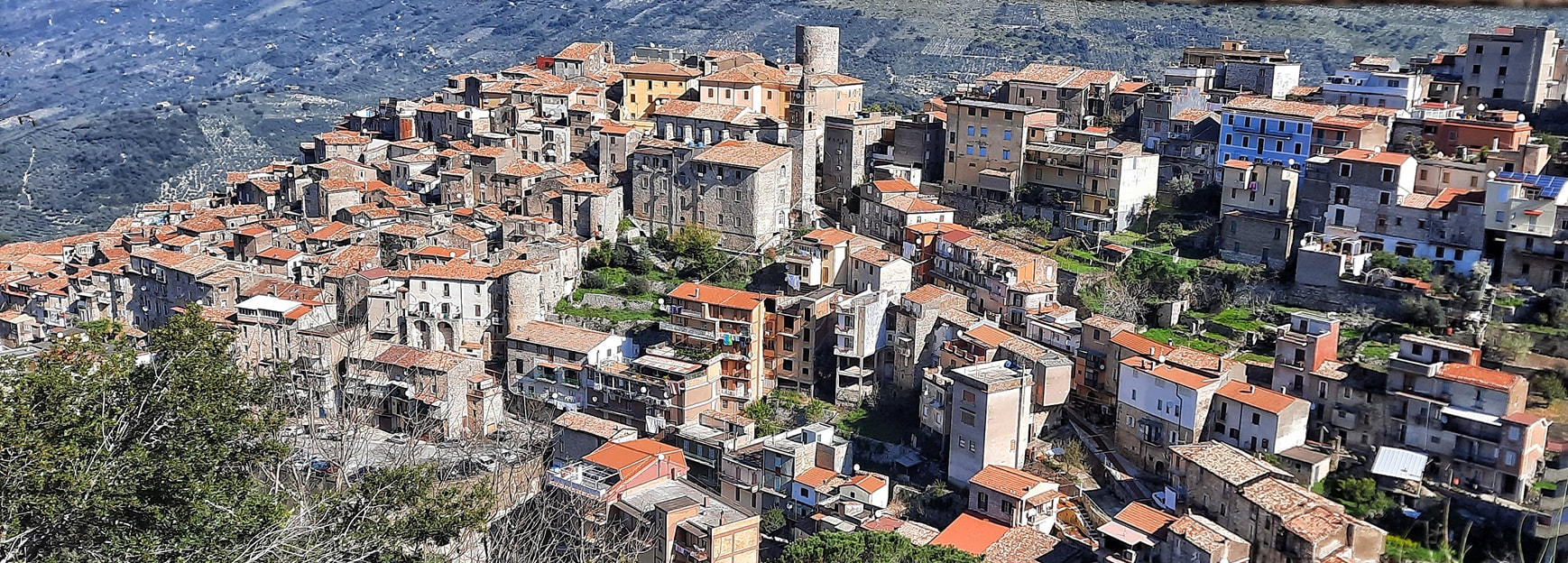
- View of Sonnino

- Coat of arms

- Location within Italy Location within Lazio
- Coordinates: 41°25′N 13°14′E
- Country: Italy
- Region: Lazio
- Province: Latina (LT)
- Frazioni: Capocroce, Cerreto, Frasso, La Sassa, Sonnino Scalo

Government
  - Mayor: Luciano De Angelis

Area
  - Total: 63 km^{2} (24 sq mi)
- Elevation: 430 m (1,410 ft)

Population (31 May 2022)
  - Total: 7,363
  - Density: 120/km^{2} (300/sq mi)
- Demonym: Sonninesi
- Time zone: UTC+1 (CET)
  - Summer (DST): UTC+2 (CEST)
- Postal code: 04010
- Dialing code: 0773
- Patron saint: St. Gaspar del Bufalo and St. Mark
- Saint day: October 21 and April 25
- Website: Official website

Sonnino is a town and comune in the province of Latina, in the Lazio region of central Italy.

It is the birthplace of Italian national team footballer Alessandro Altobelli, and Roman Catholic archbishop Velasio de Paolis.

== History ==
Originating in the Early Middle Ages (the name deriving perhaps from the Latin sommum, meaning "top"), Sonnino is mentioned for the first time in a Papal bull from 999. It was held first by the De Sompnino, and was acquired by Onorato I Caetani in 1369. The castle was inhabited by the Caetani d'Aragona until they sold it in 1469 to the Colonna, who were later followed by the Antonelli and the Talani families.

In July 1819 Cardinal Ercole Consalvi, Secretary of State at the Vatican, ordered Sonnino to be razed to the ground as it had become a notorious haunt of the banditi in the Campagna di Roma.

== Twin towns ==
- Eysines, France, since 1997
- Kanal ob Soči, Slovenia, since 2003
- Binasco, Italy, since 2009
