= John Jeremiah Lawler =

American prelate

His Excellency, The Most Reverend John Jeremiah Lawler
- Bishop of Lead/Rapid City titular bishop of Hermopolis Maior
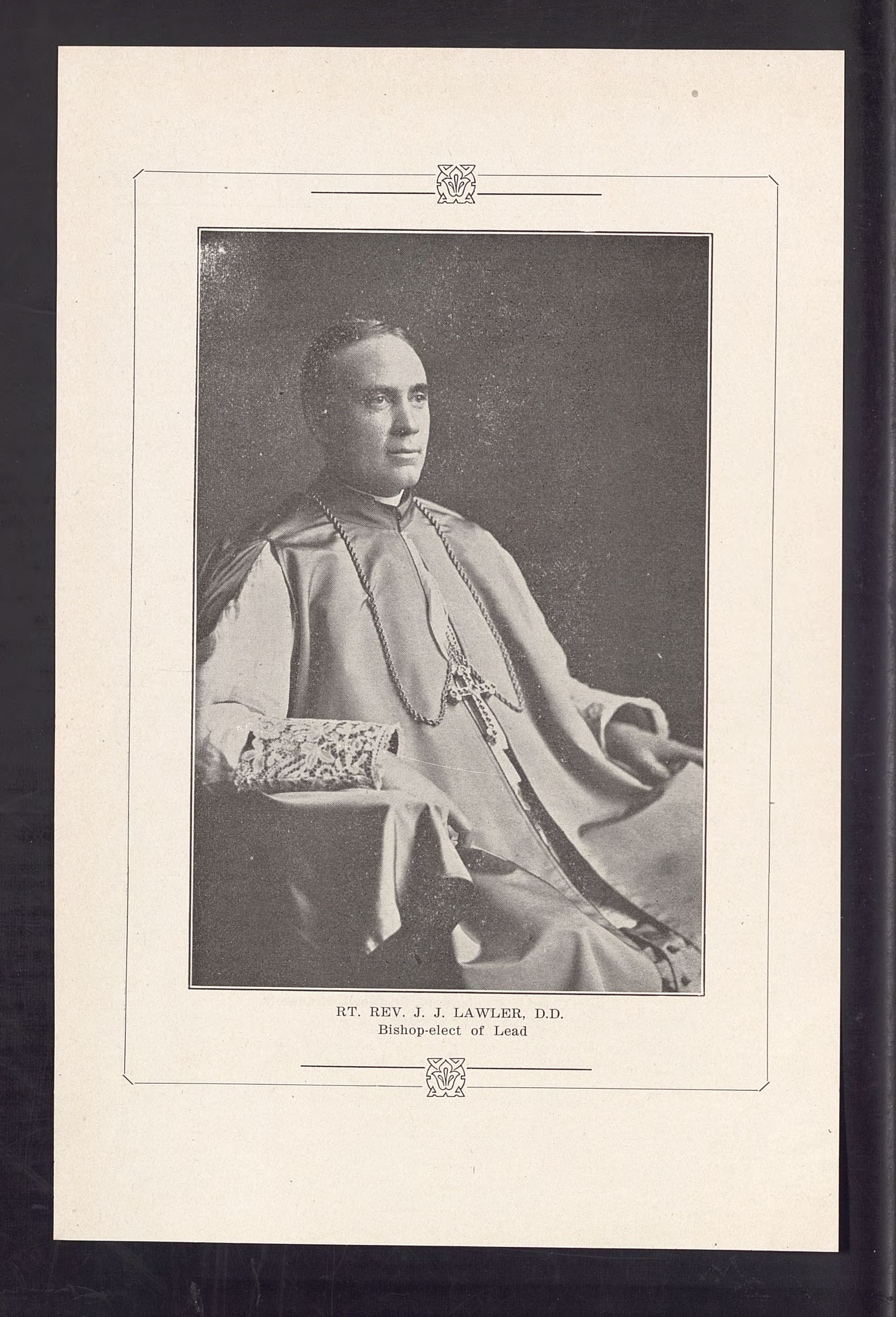
- Rt. Rev. J. J. Lawler, D.D., Bishop-elect of Lead.
- Church: Roman Catholic Church
- See: Diocese of Lead/Rapid City
- In office: Jan. 29, 1916 – Mar. 11, 1948
- Predecessor: Joseph Francis Busch
- Successor: William Tibertus McCarty

Orders
- Ordination: December 19, 1885
- Consecration: May 19, 1910 by John Ireland

Personal details
- Born: August 4, 1862 Rochester, Minnesota, U.S.
- Died: March 11, 1948 (aged 85) Rapid City, South Dakota, U.S.
- Education: St. Francis Seminary; University of Louvain
- Motto: Deus providebit (God will provide)
- Coat of arms

Styles of John Jeremiah Lawler
- Reference style: His Excellency; The Most Reverend
- Spoken style: Your Excellency
- Religious style: Bishop

John Jeremiah Lawler (August 4, 1862 – March 11, 1948) was an American prelate of the Roman Catholic Church. He served as bishop of the Diocese of Lead (later changed to Diocese of Rapid City) in South Dakota from 1916 until his death in 1948. He previously served as an auxiliary bishop of the Archdiocese of Saint Paul in Minnesota from 1910 to 1916.

== Biography ==
=== Early life ===
John Lawler was born on August 4, 1862, in Rochester, Minnesota, and attended St. Francis Seminary in Milwaukee, Wisconsin. He continued his studies in Belgium, studying philosophy at the College of St. Nicholas in Flanders and theology at the University of Louvain.

=== Priesthood ===
Lawler was ordained to the priesthood at Louvain on December 19, 1885, by Cardinal Pierre-Lambert Goossens. Following his return to Minnesota, Lawler served as professor of scripture at the College of St. Thomas in St. Paul and later pastor of St. Luke's Parish in St. Paul. He also served as rector of the Cathedral of St. Paul in St. Paul As rector, he was instrumental in the erection of the cathedral at a cost of $5 million.

=== Auxiliary Bishop of Saint Paul ===
On February 8, 1910, Lawler was appointed auxiliary bishop of St. Paul and titular bishop of Hermopolis Maior by Pope Pius X. He received his episcopal consecration at Saint Paul Seminary on May 19, 1910, from Archbishop John Ireland, with Bishops James McGolrick and James Trobec serving as co-consecrators. As an auxiliary bishop, he assisted Ireland for six years.

=== Bishop of Lead/Rapid City ===
Lawler was appointed the third bishop of Lead by Pope Benedict XV on January 29, 1916. On August 1, 1930, the episcopal see of the diocese was changed from Lead, South Dakota, to Rapid City, South Dakota, and the name of the diocese was changed accordingly. In 1947, Lawler, who had been in failing health, received Bishop William McCarty as his coadjutor bishop.

=== Death and legacy ===
John Lawler died following a stroke on March 11, 1948, at age 85. At the time of his death, he was the oldest Catholic bishop in the United States and was the second most senior in years of service.

Catholic Church titles
Preceded by Joseph Francis Busch	Bishop of Lead/Rapid City; 1916–1948	Succeeded by William Tibertus McCarty
