= Diocese of Daejeon (Catholic) =

Latin Catholic diocese in South Korea

Coordinates: 36.3167°N 127.4170°E

Diocese of Daejeon Dioecesis Taeieonensis 대전교구

Location
- Country: South Korea
- Territory: Daejeon, Sejong and South Chungcheong
- Ecclesiastical province: Seoul
- Metropolitan: Seoul

Statistics
- Area: 9,190 km^{2} (3,550 sq mi)
- Population: Total; Catholics: (as of 2017); 3,866,219; 335,152 (8.5%)
- Parishes: 142

Information
- Denomination: Catholic
- Sui iuris church: Latin Church
- Rite: Roman Rite
- Established: June 23, 1958 (67 years ago)
- Cathedral: Cathedral of St. Joseph the Worker in Daejeon
- Patron saint: Our Lady of Lourdes

Current leadership
- Pope: Leo XIV
- Bishop: Augustinus Kim Jong Soo
- Auxiliary Bishops: Stephanus Han Jung-hyun

Map

Website
- djcatholic.or.kr

The Diocese of Daejeon (Latin: Dioecesis Taeieonensis, Hangul: 천주교 대전교구) is a Latin Catholic diocese of the Catholic Church in South Korea. It is the diocese for Daejeon, South Korea. Augustinus Kim Jong-soo has been appointed its bishop; Stephanus Han Jung-hyun is auxiliary bishop.

== History ==
On 23 June 1958 Pope Pius XII erected the apostolic vicariate of Daejeon. The vicariate was made a diocese on 10 March 1962 by Pope John XXIII.

== Leadership ==
=== Ordinaries ===
Apostolic Vicars of Daijeon

- Adrien-Joseph Larribeau, M.E.P. (1958–1962)

Bishops of Daejeon

- Adrien-Joseph Larribeau, M.E.P. (1962–1965)
- Peter Hwang Min Syeng (1965–1984)
- Joseph Kyeong Kap-ryong (1984–2005)
- Lazarus You Heung-sik (2005–2021)
- Augustinus Kim Jong-soo (2022–present)

=== Coadjutor bishops ===
- Lazarus You Heung-sik (2003–2005)

=== Auxiliary bishops ===
- Augustinus Kim Jong-soo (2009–2022)
- Stephanus Han Jung-hyun (2020–present)
