= Scott E. Bullock =

American Catholic prelate (born 1963)

His Excellency, The Most Reverend Scott E. Bullock
- Bishop of Rapid City
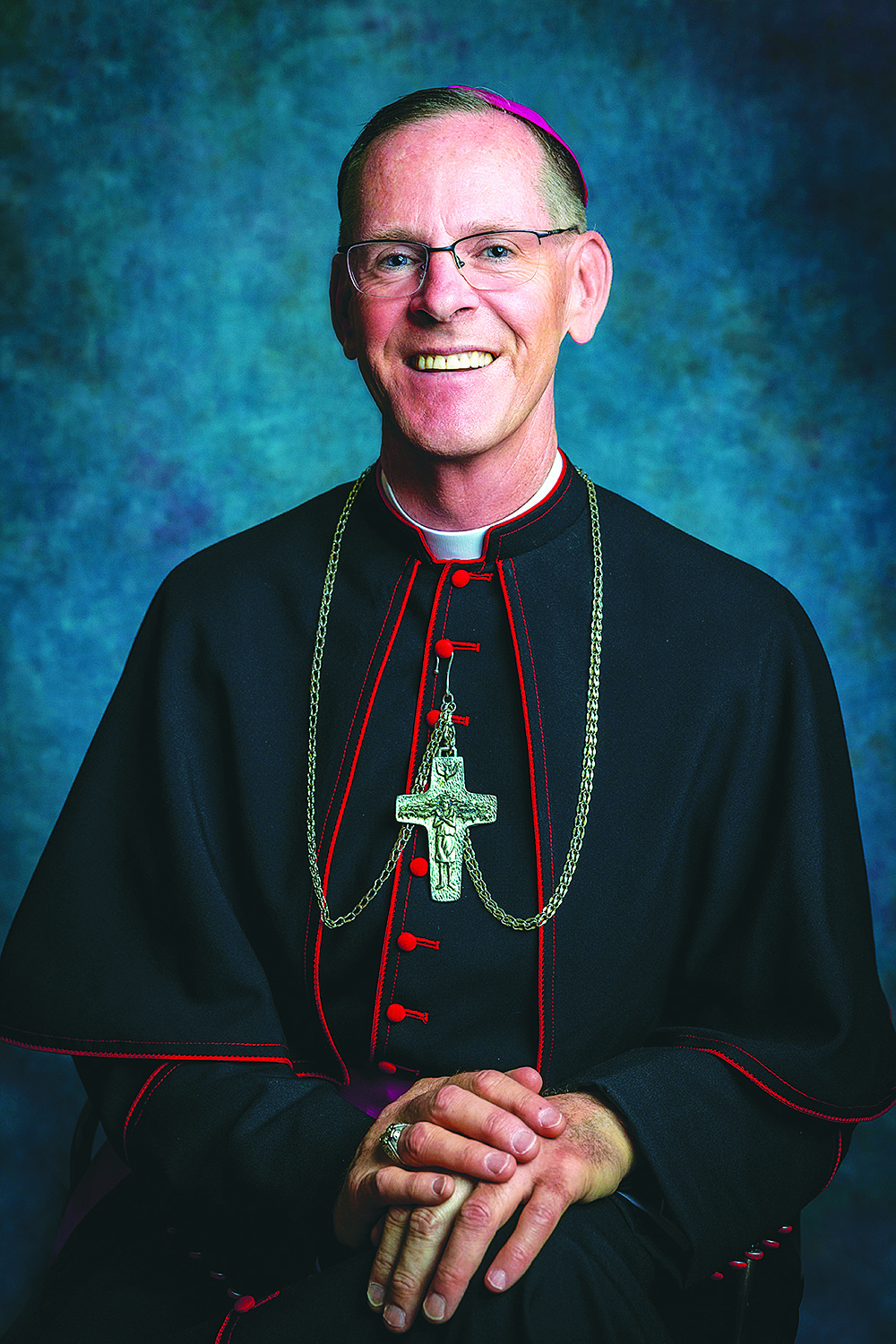
- Formal portrait, 2024
- Diocese: Rapid City
- Appointed: June 25, 2024
- Installed: September 23, 2024
- Predecessor: Peter Michael Muhich

Orders
- Ordination: June 22, 1991 by Daniel Kucera
- Consecration: September 23, 2024 by Bernard Hebda, William Michael Joensen, and Donald DeGrood

Personal details
- Born: October 26, 1963 (age 62) Royal Oak, Michigan, US
- Education: University of Delaware; General Motors Institute; St. John's University; Pontifical North American College; Catholic University of America; Southern New Hampshire University
- Motto: Surgite eamus (Latin for 'Rise, let us go')
- Styles
- Reference style: His Excellency; The Most Reverend
- Spoken style: Your Excellency
- Religious style: Bishop

Scott Edward Bullock (born October 26, 1963) is an American Catholic prelate serving as Bishop of Rapid City in South Dakota since 2024.

== Biography ==
=== Early life ===
Bullock was born to Alexander and Mildred Bullock on October 26, 1963, in Royal Oak, Michigan, the youngest of three children. His family moved to Elkton, Maryland where he graduated from high school. Bullock entered the University of Delaware in Newark, where he studied engineering. Bullock attended the General Motors Institute in Flint, Michigan, where he graduated with a Bachelor of Science degree in industrial engineering in 1985. He then worked in the automotive industry.

Bullock enrolled in pre-theology studies at St. John's University in Collegeville, Minnesota in 1987. He later attended the Pontifical North American College, where he earned a degree in sacred theology in 1991.

=== Priesthood ===
Bullock was ordained to the priesthood on June 22, 1991, at St. Raphael's Cathedral for the Archdiocese of Dubuque by Archbishop Daniel Kucera. After his ordination, he was made associate pastor at St. Matthew Parish in Cedar Rapids, Iowa. He was transferred in 1994 to St. Edward Parish in Waterloo, Iowa. At the same time, he joined the faculty at Columbus High School in Waterloo.

Bullock studied canon law at the Catholic University of America in Washington D.C. and was awarded a Licentiate in Canon Law in 1997. After returning to Iowa, he was appointed as a judge for the diocesan tribunal. Bullock later became director of seminarians. In 2003, he was named rector of Saint Pius X Seminary in Dubuque. Archbishop Jerome Hanus appointed Bullock as judicial vicar in 2010.

In 2011, Bullock was appointed pastor of Nativity Parish in Dubuque. Three years later, he was sent back to St. Edward Parish to serve as pastor. He received a Master of Arts degree in English from Southern New Hampshire University in 2015.

=== Episcopal career ===
Pope Francis appointed Bullock as bishop of Rapid City on June 25, 2024. On September 23, 2024, Bullock was consecrated as a bishop in Rapid City by Archbishop Bernard Hebda.

== Episcopal succession ==
Catholic Church titles
Preceded by Peter Michael Muhich	Bishop of Rapid City; 2024–present	Succeeded by Incumbent
