= Cathedral of Our Lady of Perpetual Help (Rapid City, South Dakota) =

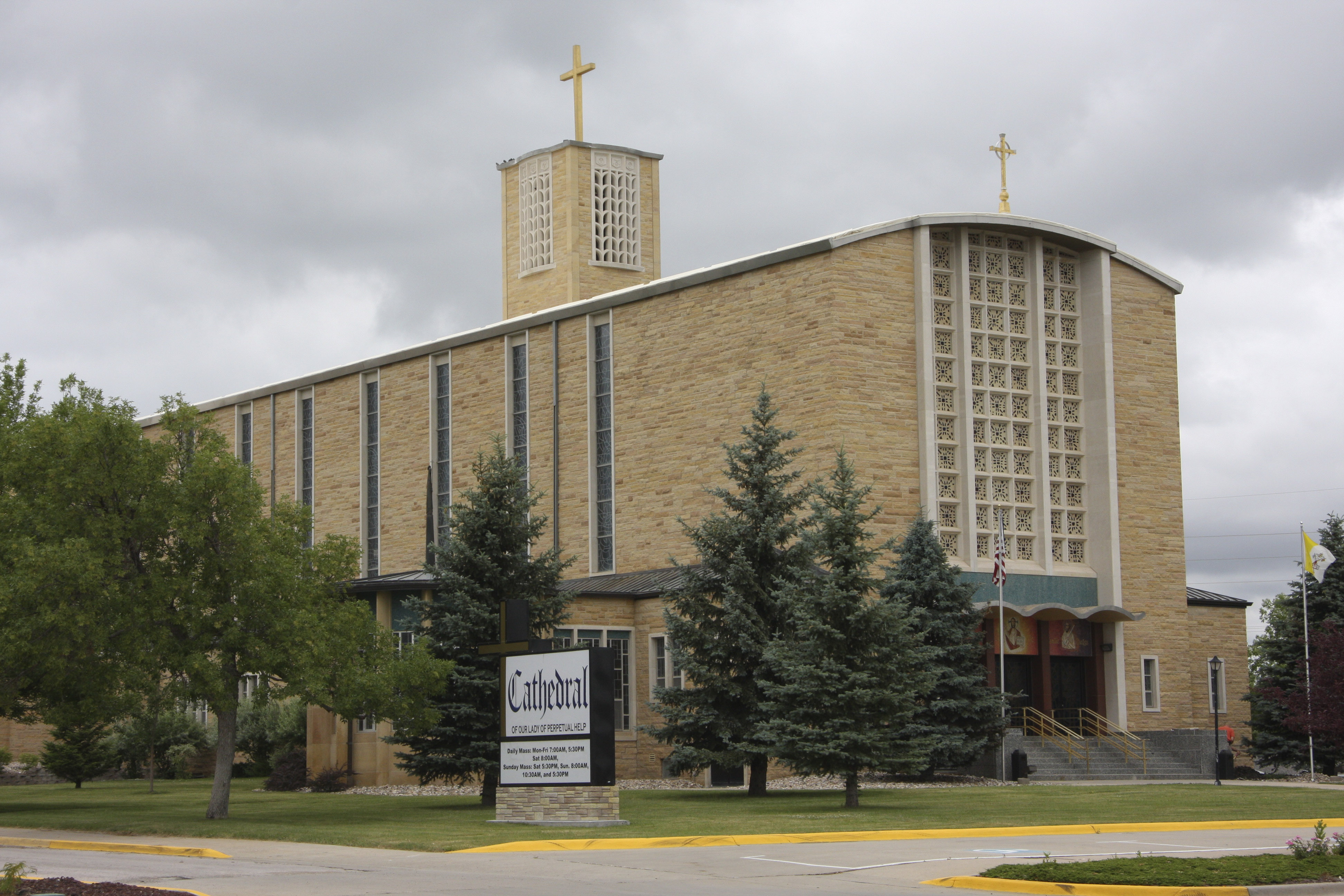

- Location in South Dakota Cathedral of Our Lady of Perpetual Help (the United States)
- 44°03′36″N 103°13′39″W
- Location: 606 Cathedral Drive; Rapid City, South Dakota
- Country: United States
- Denomination: Roman Catholic
- Website: cathedralolph.org

History
- Status: Cathedral/Parish church
- Dedication: May 7, 1963

Architecture
- Architect: Adrian L. Forrette
- Style: Mid-Century
- Groundbreaking: 1960
- Completed: 1962

Specifications
- Capacity: 1,000
- Length: 235 feet (72 m)
- Height: ~48ft
- Materials: Stone

Administration
- Diocese: Rapid City

Clergy
- Bishop: Most Rev. Scott E. Bullock
- Rector: Rev. Brian P. Christensen

The Cathedral of Our Lady of Perpetual Help is a Catholic cathedral and parish church located in Rapid City, South Dakota, United States. Completed in 1962, it serves as the third cathedral of the Diocese of Rapid City.

== History ==
The Diocese of Rapid City was founded as the Diocese of Lead in 1902. St. Patrick's in Lead served as the diocese's first cathedral. The See city was transferred to Rapid City in 1930 and St. Mary's Church downtown was renamed the Cathedral of the Immaculate Conception at that time. The parish started to outgrow the cathedral church and Mass was held in the school gymnasium. Bishop William T. McCarty, C.Ss.R. initiated the process to build a new cathedral. The cathedral rector, Msgr. Michael Roach, oversaw the construction of the new church on land donated on the outskirts of Rapid City by Katherine Wapole in memory of her husband William.

The Cathedral of Our Lady of Perpetual Help was designed by Adrian L. Forrette of the local architectural firm of Ewing and Forrett, and the general contractor was the Brezina Construction Company. Groundbreaking for the new cathedral was held in 1960 and it was completed in 1962. It was placed under the patronage of Our Lady of Perpetual Help, an icon housed in the Church of St. Alphonsus Liguori in Rome. The cathedral was dedicated by Archbishop Egidio Vagnozzi, Apostolic Delegate to the United States, on May 7, 1963. There is a large social hall in the basement of the cathedral, and the rectory is located to the west.

A larger pipe organ was installed in the rear gallery of the cathedral in 1983, which reduced the seating capacity there by 100 people. In 2012 the carillon in the bell tower was replaced with a computerized system. Construction on a 12,000-square-foot (1,100 m^{2}) addition began in 2019 to the south of the cathedral church. Completed in 2024, it includes a new parish hall with classroom and meeting space and a kitchen.

== Architecture ==
The cathedral is a Mid-century modern church building that is rectangular in shape with a curved roof. The structure is composed of reinforced concrete that is faced with Mankato stone and trimmed in Indiana limestone. On the north side of the building is a 107 feet (33 m) bell tower that is capped with an 18-foot (5.5 m) cross. On the opposite side is a baptistery located near the main entrance and a 55-by-35-foot (17 by 11 m) chapel off of the chancel. On the main facade is an expanse of faceted glass panels with stone tracery. An undulating, cantilevered canopy is located above the three entrance portals. The steps are composed of Cold Spring granite. The cathedral's setting is at the crest of a hill and can be seen from many parts of Rapid City.

The interior features a 235-foot (72 m) long nave that is lined by eighteen tall, narrow stained glass windows and it is capped by a barrel vaulted ceiling. Seating for 1,000 people is located in a wider section of the nave that is flanked by narrow naves that contain side aisles. A large icon of Our Lady of Perpetual Help hangs above the marble altar. It is one of the largest known replicas in the world of the original icon, which is located in Rome. The bishop's cathedra is located to the left of the altar and is made from hand-carved walnut. There are several types of marble in the interior that were imported from Italy.

== See also ==
- List of Catholic cathedrals in the United States
- List of cathedrals in the United States
