= Lázaro Pérez Jiménez =

Mexican bishop

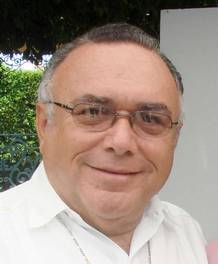
Lázaro Jiménez

Lázaro Pérez Jiménez (September 9, 1941 – October 25, 2009) was the Roman Catholic, Mexican bishop of the Roman Catholic Diocese of Celaya. Ordained to the priesthood on September 21, 1968, he was named bishop on May 15, 1991, and was consecrated on June 29, 1991.
