= Joseph Kyeong Kap-ryong =

South Korean priest (1930–2020)

- Bishop of Daejeon
- Native name: 경갑룡 요셉
- Church: Catholic Church
- Diocese: Diocese of Daejeon
- In office: 2 July 1984 – 1 April 2005
- Predecessor: Peter Hwang Min Syeng
- Successor: Lazarus You Heung-sik
- Previous posts: Titular Bishop of Buffada (1977-1984); Auxiliary Bishop of Seoul (1977-1984)

Orders
- Ordination: 21 December 1962
- Consecration: 25 March 1977 by Stephen Kim Sou-hwan

Personal details
- Born: 11 March 1930 Yeongdeungpo District, Keijō, Chōsen, Empire of Japan
- Died: 16 December 2020 (aged 90)

Joseph Kyeong Kap-ryong (Korean: 경갑룡 요셉; 11 March 1930 – 16 December 2020) was a South Korean Roman Catholic bishop.

Kyeong Kap-ryong was born in South Korea and was ordained to the priesthood in 1962. He served as titular bishop of Buffada and auxiliary bishop of the Roman Catholic Archdiocese of Seoul from 1977 to 1984 and as bishop of the Roman Catholic Diocese of Daejeon, in central South Korea, from 1984 to 2005.

== Notes ==
Catholic Church titles
Preceded by Peter Hwang Min Syeng	Bishop of Daejeon; 1984–2005	Succeeded by Lazarus You Heung-sik
