= Celaya Cathedral =

Immaculate Conception Cathedral
- Catedral de la Purísima Concepción
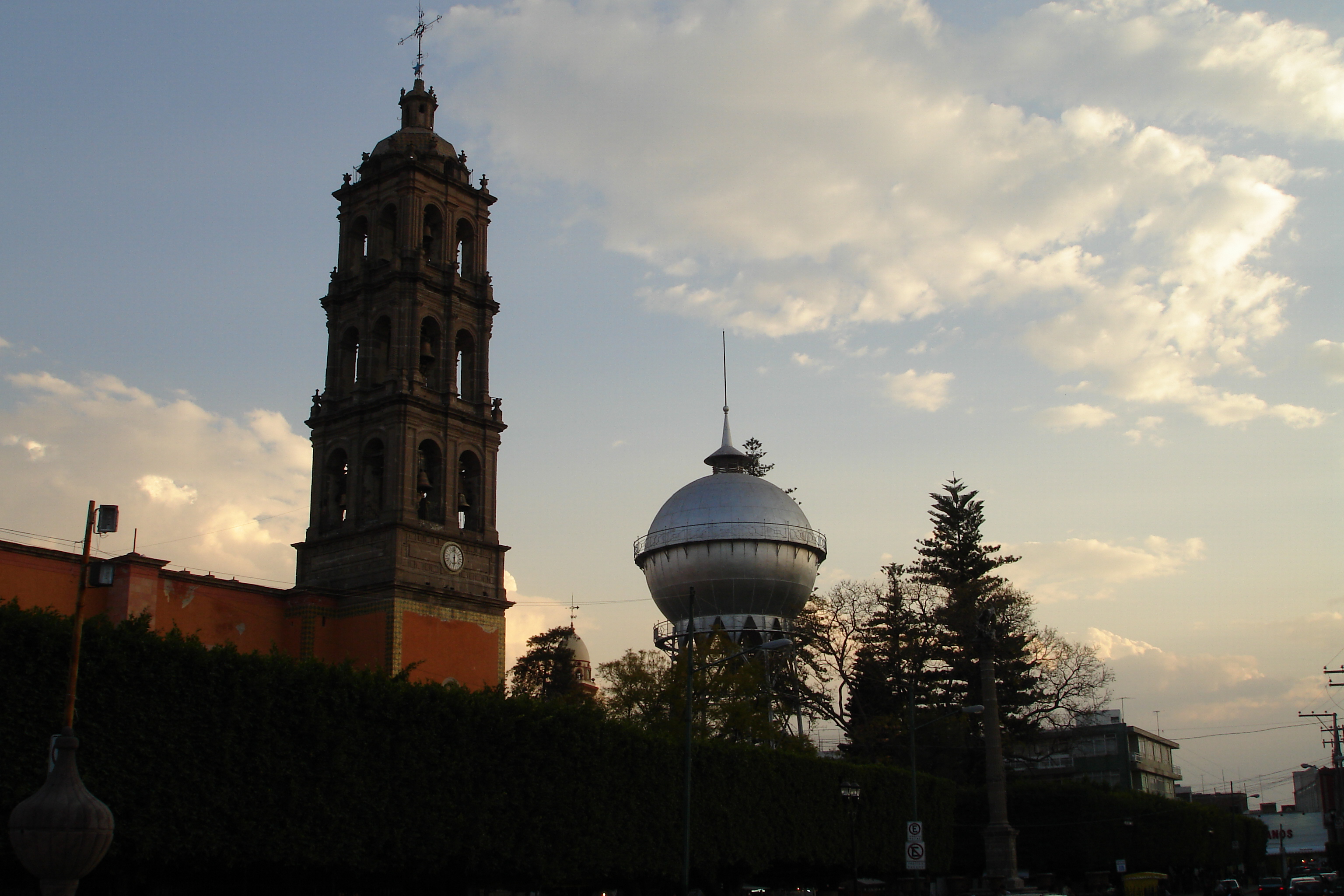

- Location within Guanajuato Location within Mexico
- Immaculate Conception Cathedral
- 20°31′21″N 100°48′42″W
- Location: Celaya
- Country: Mexico
- Denomination: Roman Catholic Church

The Immaculate Conception Cathedral (Spanish: Catedral de la Purísima Concepción), also Celaya Cathedral, is the main Catholic building in the city of Celaya in Mexico, occupying at present what was the space of a chapel annexed to the Temple of St. Francis (Templo de San Francisco). Because of the size of this last temple, it has come to confuse the Temple of St. Francis with the cathedral, a common mistake.

The San Francisco Temple was erected by the Franciscan Order, who evangelized in the place, having originally built a small chapel of smaller proportions, as well as the convent attached. The first stone of this temple was erected on February 2 of the year 1683. The Cathedral of Celaya is not the Temple of San Francisco. The cathedral is located to the side of the aforementioned Franciscan temple and has been administered for many years by the diocesan clergy.

The advances in the work were slow; by 1715 the vaults had been closed, and by the year 1725 the tower was completed.

Remodeled at the beginning of the 19th century, and at the beginning of the 20th century. It also suffered a fire, by which the last remodeling was carried out, in which was added a German organ of good bill, placed in the part of the choir.

== See also ==
- Roman Catholicism in Mexico
- Immaculate Conception Cathedral
