= William Tibertus McCarty =

American Roman Catholic priest and bishop

His Excellency, The Most Reverend William Tibertus McCarty C.Ss.R
- Bishop of Rapid City; Titular Bishop of Anaea; Titular Bishop of Rotdon
- Church: Roman Catholic Church
- See: Diocese of Rapid City
- Other posts: Bishop for the Military Services, USA 1943 to 1947; Titular Bishop of Anaea

Orders
- Ordination: June 10, 1915 by John Murphy Farley
- Consecration: January 25 1943 by Francis Spellman

Personal details
- Born: August 11, 1889 Crossingville, Crawford County, Pennsylvania, US
- Died: September 14, 1972 (aged 83) Rapid City, South Dakota, US
- Education: St. Mary's College (North East, Pennsylvania); St. Mary's College (Ilchester, Maryland); Mount St. Alphonsus Seminary
- Motto: Deus dei nobis suam pacem (God gives us His peace)
- Coat of arms

William Tibertus McCarty, C.Ss.R. (August 11, 1889 – September 14, 1972) was an American prelate of the Roman Catholic Church. He served as bishop of the Diocese of Rapid City in South Dakota from 1948 to 1969. He previously served as an auxiliary bishop of the Archdiocese for the Military Services, USA, from 1943 to 1947. McCarty belonged to the Congregation of the Most Holy Redeemer (Redemptorists).

== Biography ==
=== Early life ===
William Tibertus McCarty was born in Crossingville, Crawford County, Pennsylvania, to Timothy and Margaret (née Burns) McCarty. He was educated at St. Mary's College in North East, Maryland; St. Mary's College in Ilchester, Maryland; and Mount St. Alphonsus Seminary in Esopus, New York. He made his profession as a member of the Redemptorists on August 2, 1910 in Ilchester.

=== Priesthood ===
McCarty was ordained to the priesthood for the Redemptorists in Esopus on June 10, 1915, by Cardinal John Murphy Farley. After his ordination, the Redemptorists in 1916 assigned McCarty to teach at St. Mary's College He then taught at Mount St. Alphonsus Seminary in Esopus starting in 1918, where he also served as prefect of studies.

In 1930, the Redemptorists sent McCarty to Boston, Massachusetts to serve as assistant rector at the Shrine of Our Lady of Perpetual Help. Three years later, he returned to Mount St. Alphonsus to become its rector.In 1939. McCarty served as provincial of the Redemptorists' Eastern Province. During his tenure as provincial, he inaugurated fourteen Redemptorist foundations in the United States, Puerto Rico, and Brazil.

=== Auxiliary Bishop for the Military Services, USA ===
On January 2, 1943, McCarty was appointed auxiliary bishop of the Military Services, USA and titular bishop of Anaea by Pope Pius XII. He received his episcopal consecration on January 25, 1943 at St. Patrick's Cathedral in New York City from Archbishop Francis Spellman, with Bishops Molloy and O'Hara, C.S.C., serving as co-consecrators.

=== Coadjutor Bishop and Bishop of Rapid City ===
McCarty was named coadjutor bishop of Rapid City on April 10, 1947 by Pius XII. McCarty automatically succeeded Bishop John Jeremiah Lawler as the fourth bishop of Rapid City on March 11, 1948. He attended the Second Vatican Council in Rome between 1962 and 1965.

After twenty-one years of service, McCarty retired as bishop of Rapid City on September 11, 1969; he was appointed titular bishop of Rotdon by Pope Paul VI on the same date. He resigned his titular see on January 13, 1971.

McCarty died in Rapid City on September 14, 1972, at age 83.

== See also ==
- Catholic Church hierarchy
- Catholic Church in the United States
- Historical list of the Catholic bishops of the United States
- Insignia of chaplain schools in the United States military
- List of Catholic bishops of the United States
- List of Catholic bishops of the United States: military service
- Lists of patriarchs, archbishops, and bishops
- Military chaplain
- Religious symbolism in the United States military
- United States military chaplains

== Episcopal succession ==
Catholic Church titles
Preceded by John Jeremiah Lawler	Bishop of Rapid City; 1948—1969	Succeeded by Harold Joseph Dimmerling
Preceded by –	Auxiliary Bishop for the Military Services, USA; 1943 – 1947	Succeeded by –
