= Diocese of Rapid City =

Latin Catholic jurisdiction in the United States

Coordinates: 44°04′34″N 103°13′42″W

Diocese of Rapid City Dioecesis Rapidopolitana
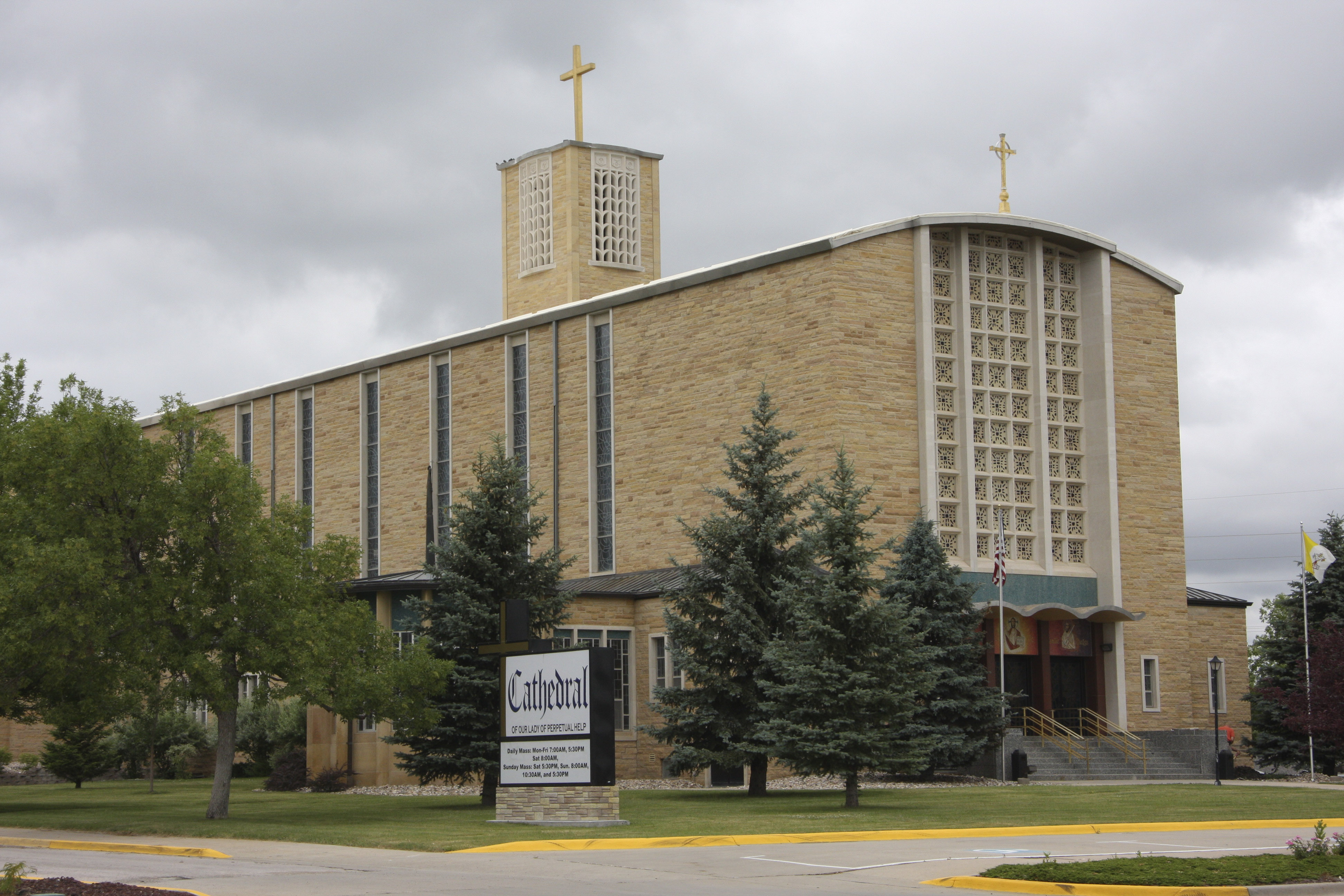
- Cathedral of Our Lady of Perpetual Help

- Coat of arms

Location
- Country: United States
- Territory: West of the Missouri River in South Dakota
- Ecclesiastical province: Saint Paul and Minneapolis

Statistics
- Area: 43,000 sq mi (110,000 km^{2})
- Population: Total; Catholics: (as of 2010); 239,000; 30,700 (12.8%)
- Parishes: 88

Information
- Denomination: Catholic Church
- Sui iuris church: Latin Church
- Rite: Roman Rite
- Established: August 6, 1902 (123 years ago)
- Cathedral: Cathedral of Our Lady of Perpetual Help

Current leadership
- Pope: Leo XIV
- Bishop: Scott E. Bullock
- Metropolitan Archbishop: Bernard Hebda

Map
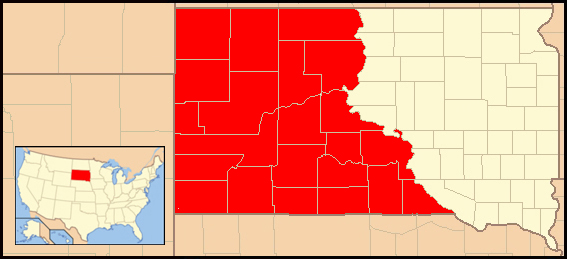

Website
- rapidcitydiocese.org

The Diocese of Rapid City (Latin: Dioecesis Rapidopolitana) is a diocese of the Catholic Church in western South Dakota in the United States. It is a suffragan diocese of the Archdiocese of Saint Paul and Minneapolis. The mother church is the Cathedral of Our Lady of Perpetual Help in Rapid City. The bishop is Scott E. Bullock.

== Territory ==
The Diocese of Rapid City includes all the South Dakota counties west of the Missouri River.

== History ==
Western South Dakota went through several Catholic jurisdictions before the Vatican erected the Diocese of Rapid City:

- Diocese of Saint Louis (1826 to 1837)
- Diocese of Dubuque (1837 to 1850)
- Diocese of Saint Paul (1850 to 1879)
- Vicariate Apostolic of Dakota (1879 to 1889)
- Diocese of Sioux Falls (1889 to 1902)
- Diocese of Lead (1902 to 1930)

The first Catholic church in the present-day diocese was Our Lady of the Holy Rosary Church near Vermillion. In Sioux Falls, St. Michael was dedicated in 1881, making it the earliest Catholic church in that city.

=== 1900 to 1930 ===
On August 6, 1902, Pope Pius X established the diocese as the Diocese of Lead, with territory taken from the Diocese of Sioux Falls. Lead was a small mining town in South Dakota. The pope named Monsignor John Stariha of the Diocese of Saint Paul as the first bishop of Lead.

During his seven years as bishop, Stariha increased the number of priests in the diocese from 17 to 25 and the number of parishes and missions from 25 to 53. Due to poor health, he moved from his official residence in Lead to Hot Springs in 1908. Due to ill health, Stariha retired in 1909.

Joseph Busch was the second bishop of Lead, beginning in 1910. Because he called for the abolition of work on Sundays, he was forced to relocate from Lead to Rapid City. Busch became bishop of the Diocese of Saint Cloud in 1915.

Auxiliary Bishop John Lawler of Saint Paul was appointed the third bishop of Lead in 1916.

Father Arthur B. Belknap was murdered in 1921.

=== 1930 to 1988 ===
Pope Pius XI suppressed the Diocese of Lead on August 1, 1930, replacing it with the Diocese of Rapid City. Auxiliary Bishop William McCarty of the Archdiocese for the Military Services, USA was made coadjutor bishop in the diocese to assist Lawler in 1947. When Lawler died in 1948, after 32 years as bishop, McCarty succeeded him. McCarty retired in 1969.

The next bishop of Rapid City was Harold Dimmerling of Saint Cloud, named by Pope Paul VI in 1969. Dimmerling established a permanent diaconate program and a lay ministry program and ordained the first Native American deacon in the country. He also set up offices in the diocese for rural life, stewardship and social concerns. He set up a ministry for people who were separated or divorced, and for widows. Dimmerling also established the West River Catholic newspaper. Dimmerling died in 1987.

=== 1988 to present ===
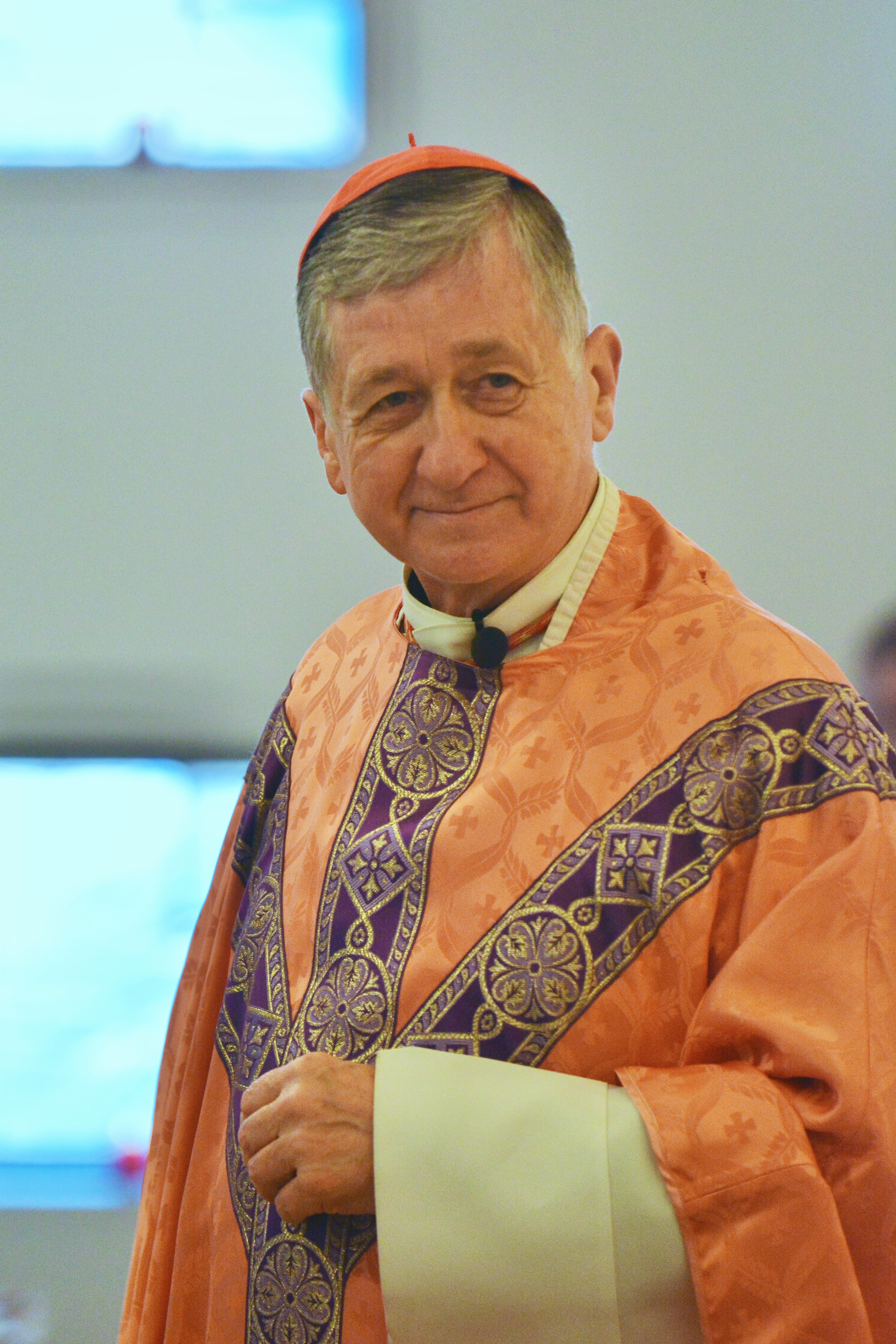
Cardinal Cupich (2021)

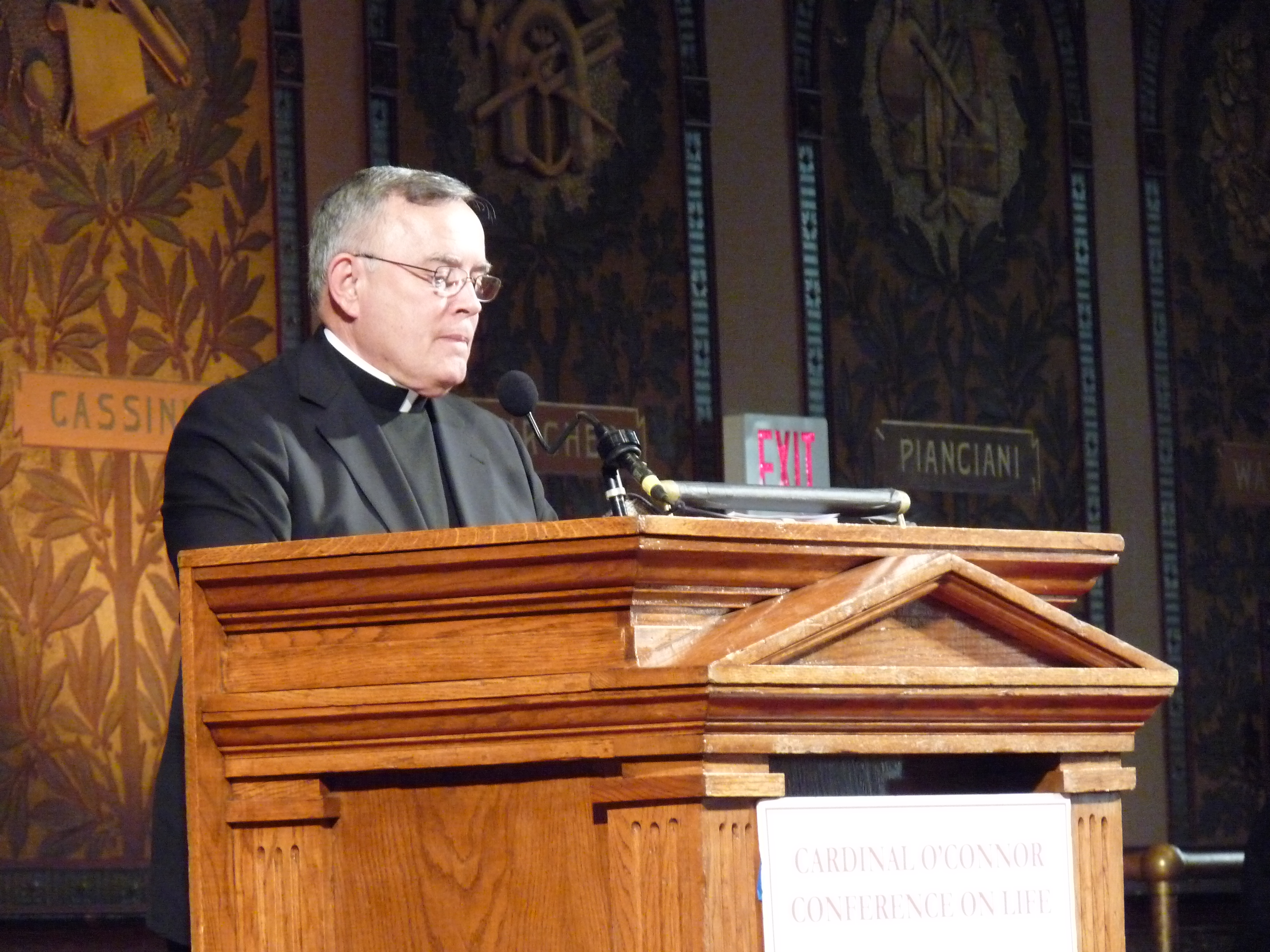
Archbishop Chaput (2011)

In 1988, Charles J. Chaput was appointed bishop of Rapid City by Pope John Paul II. He was the second priest of Native American ancestry to become a Catholic bishop in the United States. Chaput became archbishop of the Archdiocese of Denver in 1997. John Paul II then named Blase J. Cupich of the Archdiocese of Omaha to replace Chaput that same year.

As bishop, Cupich banned children from receiving their first holy communion in the Tridentine Mass or being confirmed in the traditional form. In 2002, Cupich prohibited a Traditional Mass community from celebrating the Paschal Triduum liturgies according to the 1962 form of the Roman Rite. In 2010, Cupich became bishop of the Diocese of Spokane.

Robert D. Gruss was named the next bishop of Rapid City by Pope Benedict XVI in 2011. In 2017, Gruss opened the cause for the canonization of Lakota medicine man Nicholas Black Elk. Two years later, Gruss became bishop of the Diocese of Saginaw.

On February 17, 2024, the Diocese of Rapid City announced the death of the current bishop Peter Muhich of the Diocese of Duluth, named by Pope Francis in 2020. Francis appointed Scott Bullock from Dubuque as the next bishop of Rapid City on June 25, 2024.

=== Reports of sex abuse ===
John Praveen, a priest from India serving in the diocese, was accused of sexually abusing a 13-year-old girl in Sioux City and was subsequently arrested in October 2018. Praveen pleaded guilty and was sentenced to six years in state prison in March 2019. After his prison release, the US Government was to deport him to India. In November 2020, Praveen was laicized.

In March 2019, the diocese published a list of 21 Catholic clergy with credible accusation of sexual abuse of minors. This included clergy who served in parishes and church institutions along with the Pine Ridge and Rosebud reservations from 1951 to 2018.

In August 2020, an individual contacted the diocese to accuse Michel Mulloy, the vicar general of the diocese, of sexually abusing them as a minor in the 1980s. The diocese immediately removed Mulloy from public ministry and a started preliminary investigation. The results led the review board to call for a full investigation. Pope Francis had appointed Mulloy as bishop of Duluth in June 2020, but he hadn't been consecrated yet. In early September 2020, Mulloy resigned as bishop-elect of Duluth. In March 2023, the Diocese of Rapid City said that its investigation could not prove the sexual abuse allegation, but that it would not return Mulloy to ministry.

In November 2020, the diocese reported that federal sex abuse charges were pending against Marcin Garbacz. He was already serving a prison sentence for stealing from parishes in the diocese. In March 2022, Garbacz was sentenced to five years in federal prison for recording a pornographic video of an 11-year-old boy in Poland, the sentence to be served after his release from state prison.

== Bishops ==
=== Bishops of Lead ===
1. John Stariha (1902–1909)
2. Joseph Francis Busch (1910–1915), appointed Bishop of Saint Cloud
3. John Jeremiah Lawler (1915–1930 see below)

=== Bishops of Rapid City ===
1. John Jeremiah Lawler (see above 1930–1948)
2. William Tibertus McCarty, C.Ss.R. (1948–1969)
3. Harold Joseph Dimmerling (1969–1987)
4. Charles Joseph Chaput, O.F.M. Cap. (1988–1997), appointed Archbishop of Denver and later Archbishop of Philadelphia
5. Blase Joseph Cupich (1998–2010), appointed Bishop of Spokane and later Archbishop of Chicago (elevated to Cardinal in 2016)
6. Robert Dwayne Gruss (2011–2019), appointed Bishop of Saginaw
7. Peter Michael Muhich (2020–2024)
8. Scott E. Bullock (2024–present)

=== Coadjutor bishop ===
Leo Ferdinand Dworschak (1946–1947), did not succeed to this see; appointed auxiliary bishop of Fargo in 1947.

=== Other diocesan priests who became bishops ===
- Lawrence Welsh, appointed Bishop of Spokane in 1978
- Steven Biegler, appointed Bishop of Cheyenne in 2017

== Education ==
In the Diocese of Rapid City, the schools in Rapid City itself are operated by the Rapid City Catholic School System. Red Cloud Indian School is administered by the Society of Jesus and the Oglala Lakȟóta community. Sapa Un Jesuit Academy is run by the St. Francis Mission.
