= Controversies surrounding the Legionaries of Christ =

Controversies around a Roman Catholic organization

There are several controversies surrounding the Legionaries of Christ and Regnum Christi, including its aggressive recruiting practices, elitist theology, sexual abuse by its founder and other priests, and the congregation's multi-million dollar offshore holdings in tax havens.

== Restricted work in dioceses ==
In the United States, after the sexual scandal regarding the founder, beginning in 2002 a few bishops restricted the Legionaries and Regnum Christi in Columbus, Ohio; St Paul-Minneapolis, Minnesota; Richmond, Virginia; and Miami, Florida.

In June 2008, the former archbishop Edwin O'Brien of Baltimore began to require greater oversight of the Legionaries in his archdiocese. He had particularly objected to its alleged practice of "blind allegiance", lack of "respect for human dignity for each of its members," and "heavily persuasive methods on young people, especially high schoolers, regarding vocations." He had since directed them to disclose all activities within the Archdiocese of Baltimore, and to refrain from spiritual direction with anyone under eighteen years of age. He later stated that the Legionaries fully complied with his orders.

Since the outbreak of the scandal of the founder, the Legionaries of Christ underwent a Vatican investigation. This led to a renewal of the congregation under Cardinal De Paolis. In 2014, the five-year process culminated in a new set of constitutions and new leadership.

== Elitism and exclusivity ==
Legionary seminaries said that students were from a broad variety of backgrounds. The congregation's mission was described as Christianizing society through the formation and evangelization of leaders. The old Regnum Christi Member Handbook before their renewal stated: "The Movement understands that for this action to be most effective it must give Christian formation to and apostolically mobilize the men and women that exercise greater leadership in society, in its religious, cultural, intellectual, social, economic, human, artistic, and other sectors."

== Sexual abuse scandals ==
=== Sexual abuse by Father Marcial Maciel ===
The group's founder Marcial Maciel sexually abused minors and fathered children. Marciel was a Mexican priest and the leader of the Legionaries of Christ for many decades. The scandal was linked with the wider series of Catholic sex abuse cases affecting the Catholic church.

In March, 2010, the Legionaries of Christ in a communique that "reprehensible actions" by Maciel, including sexual abuse actually happened. The communique stated that "given the gravity of his faults, we cannot take his person as a model of Christian or priestly life." At first the Legion had denied allegations and since 2006 had not made an official statement one way or the other.

==== Formal denunciation of Maciel by the Vatican ====
In 2010 The Vatican named a delegate to review the Legionaries of Christ following revelations that the order's founder is suspected of abuse of minors and fathered at least three children. In a statement, the Vatican denounced the Rev. Marciel Maciel for creating a "system of power" that enabled him to lead an "immoral" double life "devoid of scruples and authentic religious sentiment." The Vatican issued the statement after Pope Benedict XVI met with five bishops who investigated the Legionaries to determine its future. The Vatican statement was remarkable in its tough denunciation of Maciel's crimes and deception.

The "very serious and objectively immoral acts" of Fr. Marcial Maciel which were "confirmed by incontrovertible testimonies" represent "true crimes and manifest a life without scruples or authentic religious sentiment," the Vatican said. The Vatican said Fr. Marcial Maciel created a "mechanism of defense" around himself to shield him from accusations of abuse. "It made him untouchable," the Vatican said. The statement decried "the lamentable disgracing and expulsion of those who doubted" Maciel's virtue. Actions taken by the current Legionaries leadership will be scrutinized; but no specific sanctions were mentioned. The Vatican acknowledged the "hardships" faced by Maciel's accusers through the years when they were ostracized or ridiculed, and commended their "courage and perseverance to demand the truth."

As a result of the visitation, Benedict XVI named Archbishop (later Cardinal) Velasio De Paolis as the Papal Delegate to oversee the Legion and its governance, and review the constitutions on July 9, 2010.

=== Sexual abuse by Fr. William Izquierdo admitted by the Legion ===
In December 2013, the National Catholic Register published a report on a statement by the Legion, admitting that an investigation concluded that Fr. Guillermo "William" Izquierdo, LC, had sexually abused a minor while director of novices at its center in Cheshire, CT, between 1982 and 1994. The minor involved was a novice under his guidance, and charges were not conclusively investigated until Fr. Luis Garza Medina, LC, then Territorial Director of North America, was informed in July 2012.

Garza stated that Izquierdo's health had declined since 2008, through dementia, and that he was "unable to respond to questions about the allegations."

Izquierdo was one of the first seminarians recruited from Spain, along with an identical twin brother who as of 2013 was still in active ministry in South America. Sources inside the Legionaries say that both had been close to Maciel in the early years of the congregation and loyal to him during his removal on allegations of drug abuse, though it is not known if Maciel sexually abused them.

Guillermo Izquierdo has also been accused of another instance of sexual abuse, though not of a minor. The alleged victim was also a novice under his guidance in Connecticut.

=== Sexual abuse accusations against Fr. Luis Garza and Fr. Jose Sabin ===
In October 2016, accusations against Fr. Luis Garza and Fr. Jose Sabin surfaced that they both sexually abused a teenage boy in the early 1990s at a Legionaries of Christ house of formation. Since then the case against Fr Luis Garza has been dropped.

=== Sexual abuse by Fr. Marcelino de Andrés Núñez ===
Father Marcelino de Andrés Núñez, a priest of the Legionaries of Christ and former secretary of Marcial Maciel, was arrested in Spain and accused of abusing five underage girls at a school where he served as a primary and secondary school chaplain.

== ReGAIN lawsuit ==
In August 2007, the Legionaries filed a lawsuit against ReGAIN, an organization founded by ex-Legionaries critical of Legionaries practices and its founder Marcial Maciel. The lawsuit alleges that written property of the Legion, including letters written by Maciel and copies of unpublished principles and norms "intended only for dissemination and use by Legion members" were stolen and posted online "out of context ... as part of a concerted effort to wage a malicious disinformation campaign against the Legion." The Legionaries have pleaded that the value of the alleged stolen property is "worth at least $750,000."

The president of ReGAIN has asserted that, to the best of his knowledge, "nothing was obtained improperly," and expressed the opinion that the lawsuit request for information on anonymous message board posters was an action "proving that the Legion is a cult which controls information, stifles freedom of expression, and goes after dissenters."

At the conclusion of the lawsuit, the internet discussion board xlcrc.com about the Legion and its activities was taken down.

== Apostolic visitation ==
The controversies stem from the order's late founder, Fr. Marcial Maciel. The Vatican has ordered an apostolic visitation of the institutions of the Legionaries of Christ following disclosures of sexual impropriety by Fr. Marcial Maciel. The announcement of the unusual investigation by the Vatican was posted on the web site of the Legionaries of Christ on March 31, 2009, along with the text of a letter informing the Legionaries of the Pope's decision.

On June 27, 2009, according to Vatican commentator Sandro Magister, Vatican authorities named five bishops from five different countries, each one in charge of investigating the Legionaries in a particular part of the world. They were Bishops Ricardo Watti Urquidi of Mexico, Charles J. Chaput of the United States, Giuseppe Versaldi of Italy, Ricardo Ezzati Andrello of Chile, and Ricardo Blázquez Pérez, (es:Ricardo Blázquez) of Spain.

== Offshore holdings in tax havens ==
The Legionaries of Christ founder's multi-million dollar offshore holdings, long the source of speculation given the order's studied cultivation of wealthy donors and fast expansion, were revealed in the so-called Paradise Papers leak in November 2017.
