= Divine Mercy University =

Private Catholic university in Sterling, Virginia

Coordinates: 38.979678°N 77.437467°W

- Motto: Fides Ratio Actio
- Motto in English: Faith Reason Action
- Type: Private
- Established: 1999
- Affiliations: Roman Catholic
- President: Charles Sikorsky
- Academic staff: 20
- Administrative staff: 20
- Postgraduates: 360
- Location: 45154 Underwood Lane, Sterling, Virginia, 20166, U.S.
- Campus: Suburban
- Website: www.divinemercy.edu

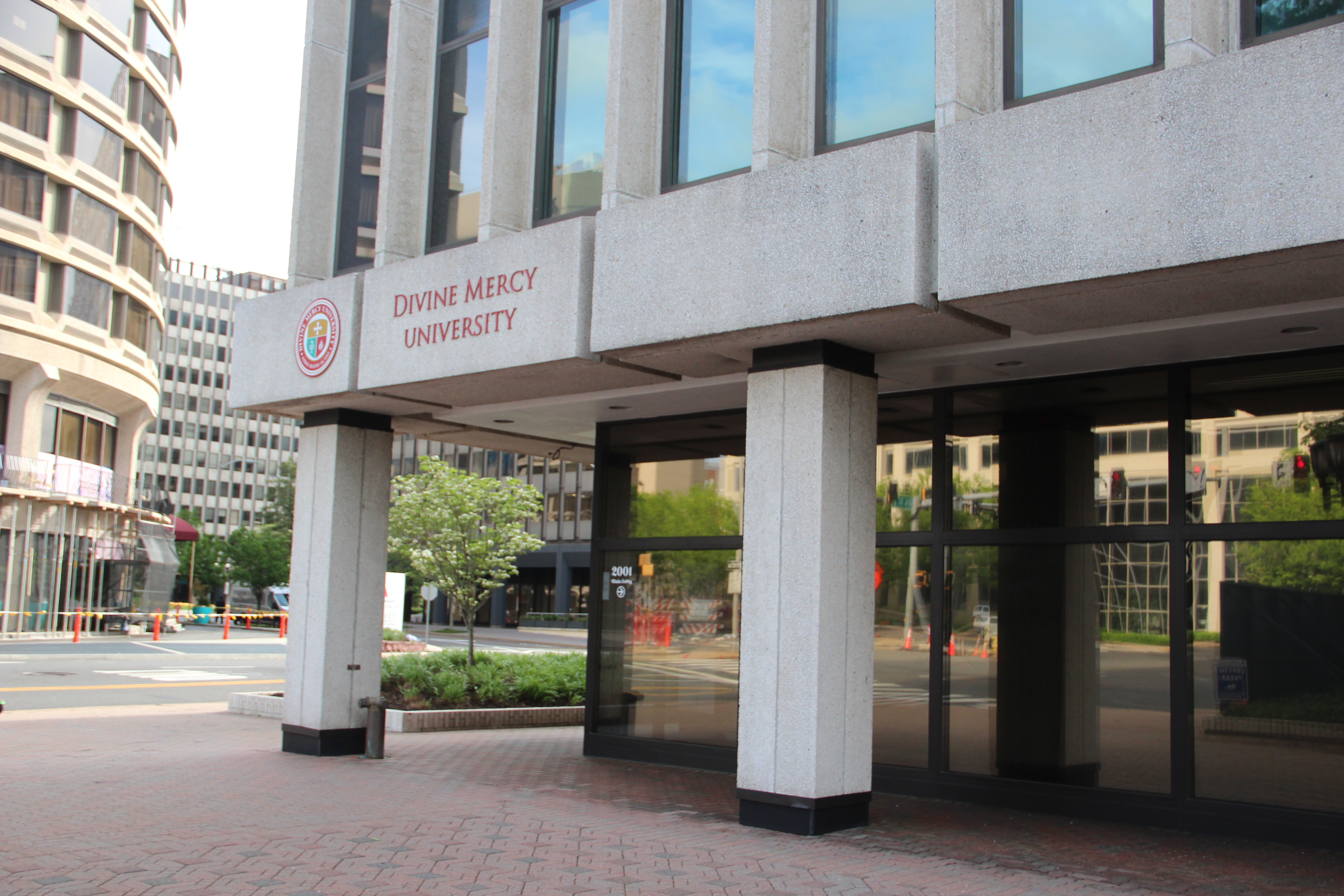
Divine Mercy University's former headquarters in Crystal City, Virginia

Divine Mercy University (DMU) is a private Catholic graduate university of psychology and counseling located in Sterling, Virginia.

== Mission ==
DMU seeks to further the science and professional practice of psychology and counseling, through the integration of Catholic-Christian anthropology, philosophy, and theology. The need for mental health practitioners with a firm and comprehensive understanding of Catholic teaching, culture, and history inspired the establishment of this institution. The university is associated with Regnum Christi, a lay affiliate of the Legionaries of Christ that was founded by Marciel Maciel.

== History ==
DMU traces its roots to the establishment of the Institute for the Psychological Sciences, which was founded in 1999 with the specific goal of training doctoral-level mental health professionals who were able to integrate various aspects of Catholicism with the scientific practice of psychology. With the foundation of DMU's School of Counseling in 2015, the Institute for the Psychological Sciences was restructured and included into DMU. With this change, DMU continued to pursue its mission at the doctoral level; however, it also expanded its mission to train master's level professionals in the mental health field. The university's main campus is located in Sterling, Virginia. Its close proximity to Washington, D.C. allows DMU to pursue its mission in a geographic area noted for its historical, cultural, and political significance.

Students from many different states and countries have elected to pursue their degrees through DMU. As of 2016, the university has trained students from over 30 states as well as from over 13 different countries. Over 160 students have graduated with advanced degrees from the programs offered by the school.

== Academics ==
The university awards graduate degrees at both the masters and the doctoral level. Degree programs are offered through the university's two divisions: The School of Counseling and the Institute for the Psychological Sciences.

=== School of Counseling ===
The School of Counseling (SOC) offers an advanced degree (Master of Science) in Clinical Mental Health Counseling (CMHC), which can be obtained through the successful completion of DMU's on-line graduate program. The CMHC curriculum is highly comparable to other professional counseling programs and it is aligned with the educational and training standards established by the Council for Accreditation of Counseling and Related Educational Programs (CACREP).

=== Institute for the Psychological Sciences ===
The Institute for the Psychological Sciences offers a Doctor of Psychology (Psy.D.) degree, which focuses specifically on clinical psychology. A master's degree in psychology is also offered through the institute, and is especially designed to meet the needs of working professionals and community religious leaders.

== Notable faculty and staff ==
- Joann V. Altiero, Ph.D. - President of the Maryland Psychological Association
- William Nordling, Ph.D. - Former President of the Association for Play Therapy and the Association for Filial and Relationship Enhancement Methods. Author.
- Harvey Payne, Psy.D. - Former Dean of the College of Counseling at Columbia International University
- Daniel N. Robinson, Ph.D. - Philosopher. Distinguished Professor Emeritus of Philosophy at Georgetown University. Fellow of the Faculty of Philosophy at Oxford University.
- Philip Scrofani, Ph.D., ABPP - Director of Psychology for the Commission on Mental Health Services in Washington, D.C.
- Sir Roger Scruton, FBA, FRSL, Ph.D. - English Philosopher. Author.
- Marc Sebrechts, Ph.D. - Department Chair, Catholic University of America, Department of Psychology
- Rev. Charles Sikorsky, L.C., J.D., J.C.L. - President, Divine Mercy University
- Craig Steven Titus, STD, Ph.D. - Theologian. Former Instructor at the University of Fribourg, Switzerland. Author.
- Paul Vitz, Ph.D. - Professor Emeritus of Psychology at New York University. Author.

== Accreditation ==
DMU is accredited by the State Council of Higher Education for Virginia (SCHEV) and the Southern Association of Colleges and Schools (SACS). The school's Doctor of Psychology (Psy.D.) program in clinical psychology is recognized by the Association of State & Provincial Psychology Boards (ASPPB) and designated by the National Register of Health Service Providers in Psychology. DMU's doctoral program is also accredited by the American Psychological Association (APA).

The SOC's CMHC is designed with CACREP accreditation in mind and is CACREP accredited as of October 2023.
