= Álvaro Corcuera =

Mexican Roman Catholic priest

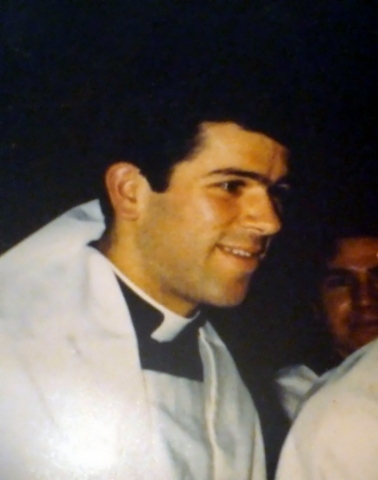
Fr. Álvaro Corcuera LC.

Álvaro Corcuera Martínez del Río LC (22 July 1957 – 30 June 2014) was a Mexican Roman Catholic priest. He was the former General Director of the Catholic Order of the Legion of Christ, serving since January 2005. On October 15, 2012, he went on sabbatical until the convocation of a general chapter; he had an advanced incurable brain tumor, which was undiagnosed at the time.

== Early life ==
Father Álvaro Corcuera Martínez del Río was born on July 22, 1957, in Mexico City. His parents are Pablo L. Corcuera García Pimentel and Ana Francisca Martínez del Río Fernández de Henestrosa de Corcuera. He was baptized four days later at Christ the King and St. Monica Parish.

Corcuera was among the founding class of students at the Legion of Christ's Irish Institute (Instituto Irlandés) established in Mexico City. The prestigious private school now includes grades from preschool (or kindergarten) through grade 12. In 1969 at the age of 12, Álvaro traveled to Ireland along with a few other young students as part of the founding group of the Legion's Irish language academy, now called Dublin Oak. During his stay in Dublin, he had his first inklings of a priestly vocation.

In 1981, recalling his stay in Dublin, Corcuera wrote: "The novices' example, along with the unforgettable experience of being close to the founder Father Marcial Maciel and the other priests living there at the time, had a decisive impact on me. The opportunity to serve the different priests' masses and above all just to be near the founder helped me to see with great enthusiasm the possibility of having Jesus Christ so close and giving him to others all over the world."

On June 27, 1971, Álvaro Corcuera became one of the founding members of the youth group of ECyD (Experiences, Convictions and your Decisions, formerly officially translated as "Education, Culture and Youth Development" although the original Spanish meant "education, culture and sports").

Later he became a member of Regnum Christi, the lay movement affiliated with the Legion. Among other activities that year, he participated in the course organized by the Legion in Reajo del Roble (Madrid, Spain). At that time, he first thought of becoming a consecrated layman in Regnum Christi.

== Consecrated and legionary life ==
On April 13, 1975, he became one of the first members of the Regnum Christi Consecrated Men. Seven years later, reflecting on his consecration, he said: "Joining Regnum Christi made me see that self-giving to Christ, wherever it might be, was the best gift that I could desire. Consecrated life was an experience that I could never completely assimilate because of its depth and greatness. It is a great gift." That year he began studying for a degree in educational sciences at Anahuac University (Universidad Anáhuac) in Mexico City, and graduated in 1979.

Álvaro and several other consecrated members of Regnum Christi volunteered as aides for Pope John Paul II's first visit to Mexico in January 1979. In September of that same year, Álvaro joined the Legion of Christ as a novice. A year later, when asked about his motivation to make the decision, and he replied: "I discovered the main reason in the tabernacle, where you hear Christ's call: "Come, follow me". Leave everything and surrender yourself completely."

He did his ecclesiastical studies in Rome at the Pontifical Gregorian University and the Pontifical University of St. Thomas (The Angelicum). He was ordained a deacon in Rome, on June 29, 1985, by Archbishop Santos Abril y Castelló, then Apostolic Nuncio to Bolivia. On Christmas Eve that same year he was ordained a priest in the Basilica of Our Lady of Guadalupe in Rome by Eduardo Martínez Somalo, future prefect of the Vatican department now called the Congregation for Institutes of Consecrated Life and Societies of Apostolic Life and future cardinal.

Father Álvaro Corcuera earned a licentiate degree in philosophy and theology at the Pontifical Gregorian University. He served as rector of the Center for Higher Studies in Rome until his election as General Director of the Legion and the Regnum Christi.

He was the founding rector of the Pontifical Athenaeum Regina Apostolorum in Rome, from its establishment in September 1993 until the end of the 1999–2000 school year. During that period he served as secretary of the Committee of Rectors of the Pontifical Universities of Rome. On December 7, 1999, he was awarded an honorary doctorate from Anahuac University (Universidad Anáhuac) in Mexico City.

On April 20, 2001, the Holy See appointed him a consulter to the Vatican's Congregation for Bishops.

== General Director ==
In January 2005 he was elected General Director of the Congregation of the Legionaries of Christ and Regnum Christi by the Third Ordinary General Chapter of the Congregation after Marcial Maciel was deposed by the Vatican due to sexual abuse scandals.

In two letters dated in October 2012, both he and Cardinal Velasio De Paolis announced that he would be taking a sabbatical until the next General Council is convoked in late 2013 or early 2014. His powers were delegated to the order's Vicar General, Sylvester Heereman, LC. He was doing so for health reasons, but at the time it was not known he was seriously ill.

Cardinal De Paolis is the papal delegate for the legion named in 2009 after an apostolic visitation concerning sexual misdeeds by the former head of the order, Marcial Maciel. Fr Corcuera's sabbatical was not a disciplinary or punitive matter, and he maintained his title without exercising it. In January 2013, he began cancer treatment for a brain tumor. In mid June 2014 he announced the brain tumor was not in remission, and he was living his last days in prayer with the Lord.

Corcuera died on June 30, 2014, in Mexico City. Father Eduardo Robles Gil Orvañanos became his successor in February 2014.

== See also ==
- Martínez del Río
- Legion of Christ
- Regnum Christi

== Notes ==
Religious titles
Preceded by Marcial Maciel Degollado	General Director of the Legion of Christ; 2005–2014	Succeeded by Eduardo Robles Gil
