= ECyD =

International Catholic youth organization

- ECyD logo
- Formation: 1971
- Type: Catholic youth organization
- Headquarters: Rome, Italy
- Key people: Álvaro Corcuera, Sonia González
- Website: Conquest website Challenge Website

ECyD is an international Catholic youth organization affiliated with the movement Regnum Christi and in close contact with one of the branches of its federation, the congregation of the Legionaries of Christ. ECYD membership is open to youth ages 11 to 16 (to 18 in the US and Canada).

== Name ==
The meaning of the acronym ECyD was changed in 2011. Originally, the acronym was ECYD, which stood for Educacion, Cultura, y Deportes in Spanish. This translates literally into English as Education, Culture, and Sports. Sports was changed to Youth Development in English-speaking ECYD groups.

From 2008 to today there have been a series of meetings of lay people, Legionaries, and consecrated members of Regnum Christi met to update ECyD's mission and identity. In 2011, this group changed the acronym to ECyD, which now stands for Encounters, Convictions, your Decisions. The team believes that this new name reflects what "happens in the heart of youth when they experience a life-changing moment of grace."

== History ==
ECyD was founded in Mexico by Marcial Maciel in 1971. One of the first members was Álvaro Corcuera, who later became the general director of the Legionaries of Christ and Regnum Christi. From 1972 to 1973, ECyD clubs were founded in Salamanca, Spain; Monterrey, Mexico; Mexico City, Mexico; Crystal Lake, Illinois; Rome, Italy; and Madrid, Spain. The first international ECyD convention was held in Ontaneda, Santander, Spain. Currently, ECyD clubs exist in thirty countries.

In 2008, Sonia González was asked to make a new international model based on the experiences of various ECyD groups over the past years. Around the early 2010s, ECyD's future was discussed among Catholic groups, as it is related to that of the Legionaries of Christ and Regnum Christi movement who underwent a time of direct Vatican control and purging of corrupt elements, from 2011 until 2019.

== Spirituality ==
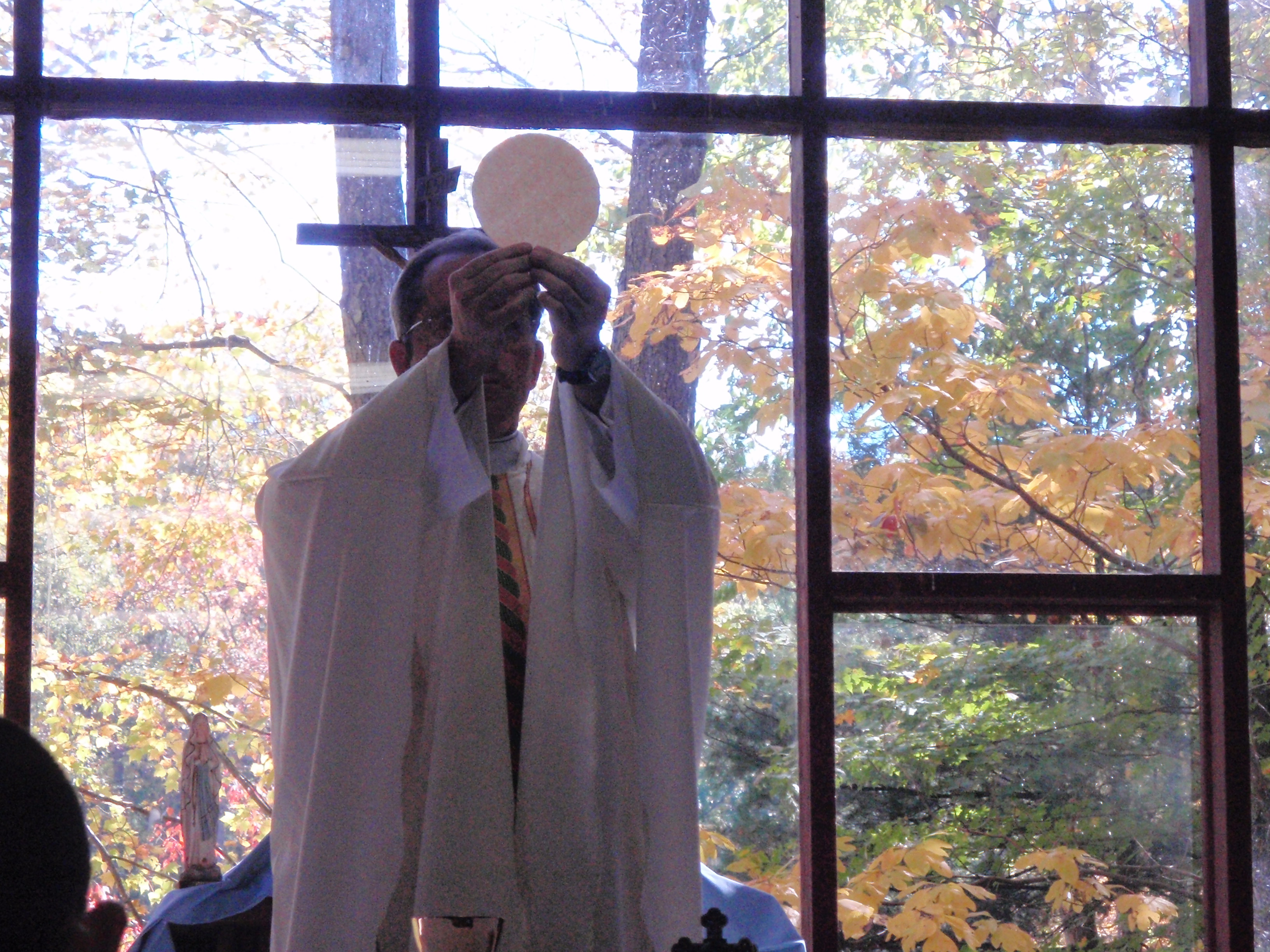
A Legionary priest celebrating the Eucharist at an ECyD camp at Camp Otyokwah in Ohio.

ECyD has a Christ-centered spirituality, together with the spirituality of the Legionaries of Christ and Regnum Christi. The purpose of Regnum Christi, the Legionaries of Christ, and ECyD is to spread the kingdom of God on earth through personal love of Jesus Christ and the Catholic Church lived out through apostolate. ECyD members share in this spirituality by making commitments to guide them in their relationship with Christ and to help them become authentic Christians. ECyD members strive to develop the virtues of charity, sincerity, friendship, purity, generosity, and joy. Upon joining ECyD, a member commits to be a better friend of Christ, say specific prayers such as the rosary and the ECyD morning and night prayers, practice virtue, and do apostolates (service projects). ECyD explains such a dedication to apostolate as "Service-Driven Apostolic Outreach and Sense of Mission."

The formation, apostolate and prayer in ECyD are all designed to be age-appropriate ways to bring teens to Christ. ECyD uses an experiential methodology based on the 10 basic needs of adolescents.

== Programs ==
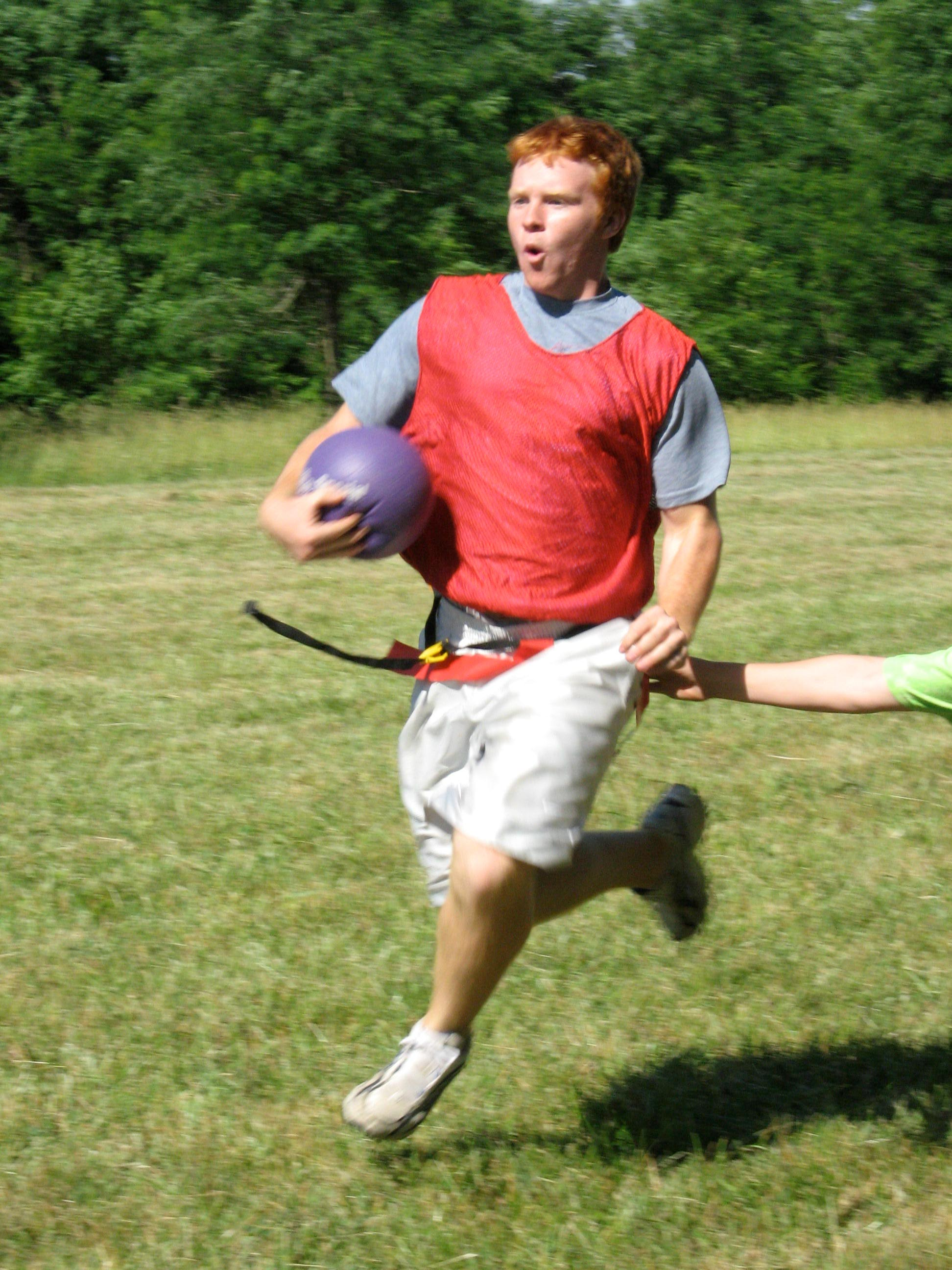
An ECyD member playing a variation of capture the flag at Camp River Ridge in Indiana.

ECyD is affiliated with several youth organizations under the Regnum Christi, and the Legionary of Christ umbrella. This affiliation is usually listed as being "Powered by EcyD." For girls, these include Challenge, Pure Fashion, leading K4J and Mission Youth. The boys' programs include ConQuest, Mission Youth, leading K4J and other leadership activities. Members of these other groups do not have to be ECyD members, but ECyD members are expected to be leaders within the groups. Participating in these organizations fulfill ECyD members’ apostolic commitments whether through activities in their clubs (Challenge or Conquest) or missionary work through Mission Youth.

=== Clubs ===
The most common way that one participates in ECyD is through a club. In the US, these clubs are usually named Conquest (boys) and Challenge (girls). These clubs are distributed by Mission Network who affiliates them mainly to parishes and schools.

==== Challenge ====
Challenge Girls' Club is a place for girls to grow in their Catholic faith, make friends, and grow in virtue. It was founded in 2000 and has had new groups start every year. ECyD is the heart of Challenge Club. Challenge's mission is "to evangelize and transform the world by forming today’s young girls to give their very best to others so that Christian culture will prevail in the hearts of everyone they meet." Challenge uses virtues education, Gospel reflections, service projects and activities to help girls develop and grow in their Catholic faith. There are also leadership opportunities within the club. Older high school girls can work as Team Leaders within the club, often planning lessons, activities, and projects for their teams of younger girls. Many girls hear about and join ECyD through participation in Challenge. Challenge has over 4000 members in the US and Canada and clubs range from 20 to 200 members. There are similar clubs operating under Regnum Christi throughout the world. In Spanish-speaking countries Club Alpes or Club Giro is the equivalent to Challenge.

==== Conquest ====
Conquest Boys' Club has three levels, Conquest Father and Son Program (ages 5–7), ConQuest Junior Program (ages 8–10), and the Conquest Club (ages 11–18). Similarly to Challenge, Conquest promotes development of virtue, leadership, character, and spiritual growth "within an atmosphere of adventure." In Spanish-speaking countries, Club Faro is the equivalent to Conquest.

In a diocesan newspaper one club president summarized what Conquest means to him: "Conquest trains boys to become self-disciplined and confident young men, Catholic leaders who possess moral integrity and are committed to improving the communities in which they live."

=== Pure Fashion ===
Another affiliate program of ECyD is Pure Fashion, an international faith-based program encouraging young women (ages 14–18) to discover their value and femininity. Pure Fashion began as an outgrowth of Challenge, attempting to show that one can dress stylishly and modestly at the same time. Pure Fashion includes a seven-week model training program during which girls learn about public speaking, presentation, fashion, and faith. The program culminates in a fashion show.

=== Mission Youth ===
Mission Youth is an apostolic group affiliated with Regnum Christi and the Legionaries of Christ that gives teens and young adults ages 14 and older the opportunity to evangelize. Programs include Holy Week Missions, Extreme Missions, and World Youth Day Missions. Many ECyD members participate in these mission programs as their apostolate.

=== ECyD Mission Corps ===
A unique program available to ECyD members is the Mission Corps, formerly known as the ECyD coworker program. Participating members can travel to other Regnum Christi or Legionary of Christ sites in different cities around the world. These summer-long programs usually involve working in children's camps, teaching English, conducting missions, working in ECyD conventions, or working in the local Challenge or Conquest clubs or their international equivalents. Participants live with consecrated members of Regnum Christi and experience community spiritual life. They can choose to apply for a program in their home country or another country based on interest, parental consent, and mission needs.

=== ECyD camps and conventions ===
In addition to retreats and camps, often offered through Challenge and Conquest, ECyD members can attend ECyD Conventions where they can meet and receive spiritual formation with other teens.

=== Other ECyD activities ===
Since ECyD is a way of life and a way of youth ministry, its scope is not restricted to the above programs but can be embodied in others such as Leadership Training Program or sports teams.

== Government ==
ECyD does not have its own separate government but depends on the government of the Legion and Regnum Christi. Fr Eduardo Robles Gil is hence the general director. Sonia González and Fr José García Sentandreu lead the specific wing dedicated to ECyD.

== Criticism ==
The criticism of ECyD relates primarily to the controversies surrounding the Legion of Christ and Regnum Christi such as issues with dioceses and the sexual scandal of Marcial Maciel.
