= Institute for the Psychological Sciences =

Graduate school of Divine Mercy University in Arlington, Virginia, USA

- Type: Graduate
- Established: 1999
- Parent institution: Divine Mercy University
- President: Rev. Charles Sikorsky, L.C., J.D., J.C.L.
- Academic staff: 17
- Administrative staff: 15
- Postgraduates: 160
- Address: 45154 Underwood Ln, Sterling, Virginia, U.S.
- Campus: Urban
- Affiliations: Roman Catholic Church
- Website: divinemercy.edu/ips/

The Institute for the Psychological Sciences (IPS) is a graduate school of psychology and an integral part of Divine Mercy University (DMU) in Sterling, Virginia. The institute was founded in 1999 with the mission of basing the scientific study of psychology on a Catholic understanding of the person, marriage, and the family, as well as being an international center for scholarship and professional training. It seeks to educate new generations of psychologists and mental health professionals, as well as open new areas of research for psychological theories that explore the relationship between psychology and the Catholic-Christian understanding of the human person.

The school offers a Doctor of Psychology (Psy.D.) degree in Clinical Psychology and a Master of Science (M.S.) in Psychology.

== History ==
The IPS was founded in 1999 by a group of mental health professionals and academicians who perceived a need for a proper understanding of the relationship between psychology and its philosophical foundations. The Institute's first and current campus is located in the Crystal City neighborhood of Arlington County, Virginia. The campus is located 1 mile from the Pentagon, Ronald Reagan Washington National Airport, two miles from Arlington National Cemetery and Arlington House, and three miles from Capitol Hill.

In 2014, the Institute opened The IPS Center for Psychological Services, which provides integrated psychotherapy as well as psychological assessments to clients from the Washington, D.C. metropolitan area. Due to the Institute's close proximity to the nation's capital, students have historically had opportunities to train at: the National Institutes of Health (NIH), Children's National Medical Center, St. Elizabeths Hospital, the D.C. Superior Court, the Psychiatric Institute of Washington, as well as other institutions in the area. In 2016, the Institute became part of Divine Mercy University, which houses the Institute for the Psychological Sciences and the School of Counseling. Throughout its history, members of the Institute have been active at the international level, by participating in various professional and educational activities, in locations such as the United Kingdom (Oxford University), Italy, Iraq, and the Holy See.

== Accreditation ==
In 2005, the Southern Association of Colleges and Schools (SACS) granted accreditation to award masters and doctoral degrees. A year later, the Psy.D. program was recognized by the Association of State and Provincial Psychology Boards (ASPPB)/National Register of Health Service Providers in Psychology, as a designated doctoral program in psychology. In 2010, IPS was reaffirmed for accreditation for another 10 years by SACS, successfully meeting all 86 standards and requirements. In 2016, the American Psychological Association (APA) granted accreditation to the doctoral program in clinical psychology (Psy.D.).

== Religious affiliation ==
The Institute is governed by a Board of Directors, which consists of the Bishop of Arlington, Virginia, several members of Regnum Christi, and three members of the Legion of Christ. The Legion and Regnum Christi support the Institute by helping it maintain its identity and by providing spiritual support. Although the Legion plays a considerable role in the governance of the Institute, and provides the school with a chaplain and president, many students and faculty exercise their spirituality in ways that are consistent with other traditions. The Institute does not require its students or faculty to be Catholic and is open to individuals of all faith traditions.
