= Martínez del Río family =

Family

The Martínez del Río family has had a prominent role in Mexican history and culture over the years.

== History ==
Originally from the Spanish region of Cantabria the Martínez del Rio family members mainly reside in Mexico. Prior to its arrival in Mexico, the family was active in trade in Central and South America, and operated out of Panama City. When they arrived in Mexico their name was Martínez Retes (Martínez del Río Retes) and was subsequently modified to its present form.

The family's historic archive contains nearly 60,000 documents which were classified by José Pablo's great-grandson Carlos and donated in 2006 by Carlos's daughters to The Center of Mexican History (CEHM) CARSO. The archive contains more than 300 years of family history. The Martínez del Río Archive can be found at the CEHM as "Archivo Martínez del Río - Fondo DCXXIII" and it covers family history from 1569 until 1989.

The Martínez del Río family acquired an interest in the Joaquín Moreno land grant in present-day McLennan County, Texas. Subsequent grants from the Republic of Texas and state of Texas were patented in conflict with the Moreno grant. Resolution of several of these conflicts made it to the Supreme Court of Texas (52 Texas Reports 170 and 62 Texas Reports 695). The family also loaned a significant amount to the government of Ecuador, so that it could pursue its independence from Gran Colombia.

== Key family members ==
- Dolores del Río (Hollywood actress) - She married (and subsequently divorced) businessman Jaime Martínez del Río
- Father Álvaro Corcuera Martínez del Río - Director General of the congregation of the Legionaries of Christ
- Pablo Martínez del Río (1892–1963), historian, first director of National School of Anthropology and History (1942), Mexico
- Carlos Martínez del Río - Professor of Zoology and Physiology, University of Wyoming
- María Josefa Martínez del Río y Fernández de Henestrosa de Redo y Vidal Soler, art historian, specialist in arts and crafts of New Spain
- Eustaquio Martinez del Río Escalante born 1981, Mexican film director, social entrepreneur, has directed 12 feature documentaries, awarded at the Human Rights Film Festival, for his film Give Earth a Chance.
