= Men of Hard Skin =

2019 Argentine drama film

- Theatrical film poster
- Spanish: Hombres de piel dura
- Directed by: José Celestino Campusano
- Written by: José Celestino Campusano
- Produced by: José Celestino Campusano
- Starring: Wall Javier; Germán Tarantino
- Cinematography: Eric Elizondo
- Edited by: Horacio Florentín
- Music by: Claudio Miño
- Release dates: January 28, 2019 (Rotterdam); June 20, 2019 (Argentina)
- Running time: 96 mins.
- Country: Argentina
- Language: Spanish

Men of Hard Skin (Spanish: Hombres de piel dura) is a 2019 Argentinian LGBTQ+ independent drama film, written and directed by José Celestino Campusano. The film stars Wall Javier and Germán Tarantino. It premiered at the International Film Festival Rotterdam in 2019, before a limited theatrical release throughout Argentina later that year.

== Synopsis ==
José Celestino Campusano's exploration of sex, power, and ecclesiastical abuse in Argentine society is a complex and often confrontational piece of work, posing tough questions without resorting to easy answers.

== Cast ==
- Wall Javier as Ariel
- Germán Tarantino as Omar
- Claudio Medina as Pablo
- Juan Salmeri as Julio
- Camila Diez as Betina
- Sergio Sarria as Ramírez
- Malena Majul Lieun as Zulma

== Reception ==
María Fernanda Mugica of La Nación lauded the filmmaker: "José Celestino Campusano demonstrates his talent to keep viewers' attention, even when he's making them confront difficult scenes." Derek Winnert of DerekWinnert.com praised the film's boldness: "Deep, dour, dark and disturbing, it is commandingly and intensely well done, but not for the faint-hearted and most people, maybe everybody, will want to turn away."

Ben Turner of The Pink Lens derided the film for its penchant for shock value: "A controversial film that is trying a little too hard to shock, this certainly isn't pleasant viewing for a Friday night in." Josefina Sartora of Otrocines concurred: "The story is crude and obvious, with no subtleties." Gaspar Zimerman of Clarín chided the acting: "Most of the cast's lack of experience is evidenced by memorized speeches spoken in an almost scholarly way, without any intonation."

Dave Hall of Gay Celluloid opined the missed opportunity: "The result is a work laced with a number of narrative turns that do nothing for the film, other than add to its running time, having wasted its potential to be a meaningful cinematic testament to the ramifications on those subjected to sexual abuse by those who preach the word of God, but habitually seek absolution for their sins. Enough said."
