= Deomar De Guedes Vaz =

Deomar De Guedes Vaz (born November 13, 1961) is second general councilor for the Legion of Christ making him one of the top leaders in the organization.

Born and raised in Santo Ângelo, Rio Grande do Sul, Brazil Vaz entered the Legion of Christ in 1992. He became a priest in 2000 and later was head of Legion of Christ activities in Spain. He was appointed to his current position in 2012 replacing Francisco Mateos Gil as part of the reform process of Velasio de Paolis which has as its goal removing the Legion from the practices and theology associated with its now discredited founder.
