= Anthony Freeman =

American religious writer

Brother Anthony Freeman L.C.
- Born: July 23, 1988; Houma, Louisiana, United States
- Died: April 2, 2018 (aged 29); Rome, Italy
- Education: East Thibodaux Middle School; Immaculate Conception Apostolic School; Pontifical Athenaeum Regina Apostolorum (B.A.)
- Occupations: Religious brother and writer
- Writing career
- Genre: Motivational/Spiritual
- Notable works: One Step Closer: 40 Doses of Motivation, Hacks, and Experiences to Share with Millennial Catholics

Religious life
- Religion: Christianity
- Denomination: Catholicism
- Institute: Legionaries of Christ
- Profession: 2013 (final vows)

Anthony Joseph Freeman, L.C. (July 23, 1988 – April 2, 2018) was an American Legion of Christ religious brother. He is noted for his spiritual book, One Step Closer: 40 Doses of Motivation, Hacks, and Experiences to Share with Millennial Catholics, which became widely read in some circles of the Catholic Church.

== Biography ==
Anthony Freeman was born on July 23, 1988, in Houma, Louisiana, to Brian and Debbie Freeman (née Lirette). His parents were devout Catholics who were active in church activities. He spent his childhood years studying at the East Thibodaux Middle School where he graduated in 2002. From 2002 to 2005, he became a student in the Legionary Minor Seminaries in Center Harbor, New Hampshire, and in Colfax, California. He was known to be a diligent and cheerful boy to his professors.

After a series of vocation discernment, he entered the Novitiate of the Legionaries of Christ in Cheshire, Connecticut, on 2005, and made his first profession of vows on September 2, 2007. During his apostolic internship, he collaborated with the congregation's vocation promotion and institutional development efforts. He studied one year of liberal arts in Salamanca, Spain and completed his bachelor's degree in philosophy in Thornwood, New York. He obtained a licentiate degree in philosophy and a degree in theology from the Pontifical Athenaeum Regina Apostolorum in Rome. On August 10, 2013, he made his final profession of vows and on February 26, 2017, received the ministry of acolytes.

On April 2, 2018, his fellow confreres found him dead in his room. Mayo Clinic declared, after conducting an autopsy, that the cause of his death was due to a dilated cardiomyopathy. On the day he died, he had just finished an eight-day silent retreat in his community and had served the Easter Sunday Mass presided by Pope Francis in St. Peter's Square. Friends and colleagues are now putting up an effort to have him considered for beatification.

== One Step Closer ==
On January 23, 2018, Freeman published what would be his first and last book, One Step Closer: 40 Doses of Motivation, Hacks, and Experiences to Share with Millennial Catholics. Before he published his book, he first started doing motivational talks on his Instagram account purposely for millennial Catholics facing contemporary issues and spiritual problems. Seeing the increasing number of followers on his account, he decided then to turn his motivational talks into writing. The moment it got published, it was widely acclaimed by people within the Catholic Church.

== See also ==
- Francis J. Parater
