= Corcuera (surname) =

Corcuera is a Spanish surname. Notable people with the surname include:

- Álvaro Corcuera (1957–2014), Mexican Roman Catholic priest
- Arturo Corcuera (1935–2017), Peruvian poet
- José Luis Corcuera (born 1944), Spanish politician
- Pío Corcuera (1921–2011), Argentine footballer
