= Catholic Church sexual abuse cases in El Salvador =

Sexual abuse of members of the Catholic Church in El Salvador has been recognized as existing since at least the 1980s, and has been condemned by the Salvadoran justice system.

== History ==
In November 2015, sex abuse scandals in El Salvador's sole non-military Catholic diocese, the Archdiocese of San Salvador, started coming to light when the Archdiocese's third highest ranking priest Jesus Delgado, who was also the biographer and personal secretary of the Salvadoran Archbishop Oscar Romero was dismissed by the Archdiocese after its investigation showed that he had molested a girl, now 42 years of age, when she was between the ages of 9 and 17. Due to the statute of limitations, Delgado could not face criminal charges. In December 2016, a canonical court convicted Delgado and two other El Salvador priests, Francisco Galvez and Antonio Molina, of committing acts of sex abuse between the years 1980 and 2000 and laicized them from the priesthood.

In November 2019, the Archdiocese acknowledged sex abuse committed by a priest identified as Leopoldo Sosa Tolentino in 1994 and issued a public apology to his victim. Tolentino, has been suspended from ministry and has begun the canonical trial process.

It was also reported at this time that another El Salvador priest had been laicized in 2019 after pleading guilty to sex abuse in a Vatican trial and is serving a 16 year prison sentence after being convicted in a criminal trial.

== See also ==
- Catholic sexual abuse cases in Latin America
