= Heereman von Zuydwyck =

Heereman von Zuydwyck is a surname. Notable people with this surname include:

- Clemens Heereman von Zuydwyck (1832–1903), German farmer, forester and politician (Centrum)
- Constantin Heereman von Zuydtwyck (1931–2017), German farmer, forester and politician (CDU)
- Sylvester Heereman van Zuydtwyck (born 1974), German Roman Catholic vicar
