= Philip Larrey =

American philosopher and Catholic priest

Philip Larrey (born 1963) is an American philosopher and Catholic priest. He is a professor of philosophy at Boston College. He was previously the Dean of the Philosophy Department and Chair of Logic and Epistemology at the Pontifical Lateran University.

He holds a BA from the Pontifical Athenaeum Regina Apostolorum, and a BA, MA, and PhD from the Pontifical Gregorian University.

== Books ==
- Connected World: From Automated Work to Virtual Wars: The Future, By Those Who Are Shaping It (2018)
- Artificial Humanity (2019)
- Quine's quest for ontology (2011)
- I filosofi analitici e la conoscenza (2011)
- Thinking logically : a historical critique of trends in contemporary philosophy of logic in the analytical tradition (2007)
