= Sylvester Heereman =

Sylvester Heereman van Zuydtwyck (born 10 September 1974) is the former Vicar General of the Catholic congregation, the Legion of Christ.

== Family ==
Heereman was born in Bad Neustadt an der Saale, Bavaria, on 10 September 1974.

== Seminary and priesthood ==
In 1994 Heereman entered the Legion's novitiate in Germany. He was ordained on 23 December 2006. From 2007-11 he was the territorial director of Germany, and then Northern and Central Europe.

== Vicar General of the Legion and Regnum Christi ==
On 16 February 2012 Heereman was named to his new post of vicar general by Cardinal Velasio de Paolis. The vicar general is second in command after the general director. He had replaced Father Luis Garza, who resigned to become territorial director of North America, and he was named after consulting the members of the Legion of Christ.

As of 15 October 2012, Heereman assumed the responsibility for running the Legion until the convocation of a General Chapter, as the former general director, Álvaro Corcuera, was on sabbatical for health reasons. In two letters, dated 9–10 October, both Álvaro and Cardinal Velasio De Paolis (the Legion's Papal delegate) announced the sabbatical.
