= Catholic sexual abuse cases in Latin America =

The Catholic sexual abuse scandal in Latin America is a significant part of the series of Catholic sex abuse cases.

== Argentina ==
- Julio César Grassi was found guilty (by a three-judge panel of the Criminal Court Oral 1 Morón) of one count of sexual abuse and one count of corrupting a minor in the "Happy Children's Foundation" and sentenced to 15 years in prison as the third member of the Roman Catholic Church in Argentina to be convicted of sexually abusing minors. Prosecutors said they were considering an appeal on behalf of the two plaintiffs whose sexual abuse accusations were dropped. Father Grassi maintained his plea of innocence of the charge and promised to appeal.
- On August 17, 2019, Argentina Bishop Sergio Buenanueva of San Francisco, Cordoba, acknowledged the history of sex abuse in the Catholic Church in Argentina. Buenanueva, who was labeled as a "Prelate" for the Argentine Catholic Church, also stated that the church's sex abuse crisis in Argentina, which also happens to be Pope Francis' native country, was "just beginning".
- On July 15, 2020, it was revealed that a lawyer issued criminal charges Archbishops Eduardo Martin of Rosario and Sergio Fenoy of Santa Fe de la Vera Cruz for seeking to "supplant the public prosecutor's office" by encouraging complaints to another body.

Archdiocese of Santa Fe de la Vera Cruz

Allegations of sexual abuse on 47 young seminarists surfaced in 1994.

== Bolivia ==
- Alfonso Pedrajas admitted to sexually assaulting 85 minors in Bolivia in the 1970s and 1980s during his time working at a Catholic boarding school. Pedrajas admitted his crimes in a private diary which was discovered after his death from cancer in 2009.
- Milton Murillo a priest at the Church of San Roque, was arrested pending a hearing for sexually assaulting students at a seminary in 2013.

== Brazil ==
Diocese of Anápolis

- In 2005 Brazilian priests, Fr. Tarcísio Tadeu Spricigo and Fr. Geraldo da Consolação Machado were convicted of child molestation while Fr. Felix Barbosa Carreiro was arrested and charged with child sexual abuse in the northeastern state of Maranhão after police seized him in a hotel room with four teenage boys.

Archdiocese of Penedo

- In 2010 Authorities in Brazil began an investigation into three priests after a video allegedly showing a priest sexually abusing an altar boy was broadcast on the SBT television station.

== Chile ==
Archdiocese of Santiago

José Andrés Aguirre Ovalle, aka "Cura Tato", was found guilty of nine sexual abuse charges by the highest court of this country. Aguirre was sentenced to 12 years in jail. At the beginning of this trial, the Catholic church was sentenced to pay 50 millions in damages to the victims, but then this sentence was revoked by the supreme court.

== El Salvador ==
In November 2015, sex abuse scandals in El Salvador's sole non-military Catholic diocese, the Archdiocese of San Salvador, started coming to light when the Archdiocese's third highest ranking priest Jesus Delgado, who was also the biographer and personal secretary of the Salvadoran Archbishop Oscar Romero was dismissed by the Archdiocese after its investigation showed that he had molested a girl, now 42 years of age, when she was between the ages of 9 and 17. Due to the statute of limitations, Delgado could not face criminal charges. In December 2016, a canonical court convicted Delgado and two other El Salvador priests, Francisco Galvez and Antonio Molina, of committing acts of sex abuse between the years 1980 and 2000 and laicized them from the priesthood. In November 2019, the Archdiocese acknowledged sex abuse committed by a priest identified as Leopoldo Sosa Tolentino in 1994 and issued a public apology to his victim. Tolentino, has been suspended from ministry and has begun the canonical trial process. It was also reported at this time that another El Salvador priest had been laicized in 2019 after pleading guilty to sex abuse in a Vatican trial and is serving a 16 year prison sentence after being convicted in a criminal trial.

== Mexico ==
Fr. Marcial Maciel (1920–2008) founded the Legion of Christ, a Catholic order of priests originating in Mexico. Nine former seminarians of his order accused Maciel of molestation. One retracted his accusation, saying that it was a plot intended to discredit the Legion. Maciel maintained his innocence of the accusations. In early December 2004, a few months before Pope John Paul II's death, Cardinal Joseph Ratzinger (who would replace him as Pope, becoming Benedict XVI) reopened a Vatican investigation into longstanding allegations against Maciel.

In January 2020 the Episcopal Conference of Mexico (CEM) announced that it had investigated 426 priests for sexual abuse of minors and other unspecified crimes in the past ten years. 217 priests have been retired, 173 cases were in process, and 253 investigations have concluded. According to the Agencia Católica de Informaciones (ACI Prensa), the CEM asked the Legion of Christ to return Fr. Fernando Martínez Suárez, who abused at least six girls in the 1990s, be returned to Mexico and turned over to civil authorities. The Legion said that Pope Francis had expelled Martínez Suárez, but they had not done so yet. El Universal reported on February 2, 2020, that of 156 cases of alleged abuse of minors between 2009 and 2019, only six had resulted in conviction.

A priest identified only as Aristeo "B" was found guilty of raping an eight-year-old girl over a period of three years in Ciudad Juárez, Chihuauhua, on February 22, 2021.

== Peru ==
In 2007, Daniel Bernardo Beltrán Murguía Ward, a 42-year-old Italian-Peruvian Consecrated Layman of the group Sodalitium Christianae Vitae, was found by the Peruvian National Police in a hostel in Cercado de Lima with an 11-year-old boy, whom he was taking sexually explicit pictures of. The boy was initially lured by Murguía Ward and given Pokémon figures in exchange for photos of his intimate parts. When Murguía Ward was caught, he had paid the boy 20 Nuevo Soles ($7 USD) for his services in the hostel. The police have reported that pictures of two other boys were also found on Murguía Ward's camera and that the boy has claimed he received oral sex from Murguía Ward. These charges have been denied by the accused. Murguía Ward has since been removed from the group Sodalitium Christianae Vitae for his misconduct.

== Venezuela ==
In 2022, a scandal unfolded in Venezuela after the American newspaper The Washington Post published a report detailing an original investigation in Catholic priests in Venezuela who were accused and/or convicted of sexual abuse. The report revealed that of the at least 10 Catholic priests accused and/or convicted of sexual abuse between 2001 and 2022, three served little or no time in sentence and returned to priesthood. The Washington Post mentioned cases that occurred in Anzoátegui, Falcón, Lara, Mérida and Zulia, although there have been complains in at least eleven states in Venezuela.

The Church confirmed the veracity of the report, admitting the existence of cases of abuse that same year, announcing an investigation and actions to prevent sexual abuse in the future. This scandal follows others that occurred in Mexico, Argentina, Chile, Colombia and Peru.

== See also ==
- Child sexual abuse
- Sexual abuse
