= Postmodern psychology =

Psychology influence by postmodernism

Postmodern psychology is an approach to psychology that questions whether an ultimate or singular version of truth is actually possible within its field. It challenges the modernist view of psychology as the science of the individual, in favour of seeing humans as a cultural/communal product, dominated by language rather than by an inner self.

== Characteristics ==
Postmodern psychology relies on using a range of different methodologies rather than a singular approach, to embrace the complexity of reality and avoid oversimplification. Post-modernism challenges a systematic, analytical approach to the understanding of the human psyche, as inherently flawed by the impossibility of taking a detached, 'objective' position; and favours instead a transmutable position which may maintain the possibility of taking conceptual hold of a self that is itself decentered.

Some would maintain that the very project of a postmodern psychology is self-contradictory, in the wake of the deconstruction of the unified self - the fading or aphanisis of the subject that psychology is traditionally supposed to investigate.

== Tetrad and transmodern ==
Postmodern psychology has also been linked to the Tetrad of Marshall McLuhan: "Tetradic logic" supposedly allowing us to accept knowing without knowing in the context of changingness.

Paul Vitz refers to yet a further development, that of "transmodern" psychology, as a "new mentality that both transcends and transforms modernity ... (where) psychology would be the handmaid of philosophy and theology, as from the beginning it was meant to be" - aspiring to cure mental problems through integrated intervention into the human mind and body combined.

== See also ==
- M. C. Escher
- G. H. Mead
- Identity politics
- Kenneth J. Gergen
- Social constructivism
- Vygotsky
- Critical psychology – Perspective on psychology
