= Center for Higher Studies =

International College of the Legionaries of Christ
- Collegio Internazionale dei Legionari di Christo
- Motto: Latin: Adveniat Regnum Tuum! English: Thy Kingdom Come!
- Type: Roman Catholic Seminary; Continuing Formation Institute, Residence
- Established: 1991
- Affiliations: Legion of Christ
- Rector: Fr. Guillermo Meade
- Location: Rome, Italy; 41.880937°N 12.39953°E
- Campus: 190 Via degli Aldobrandeschi
- Colors: Red and White
- Website: www.legionariesofchrist.org

The International College of the Legion of Christ is where most of the members of the congregation study their philosophy and theology in preparation for priestly ordination. It is located on the west side of Rome near Via Aurelia, right behind the Pontifical Athenaeum Regina Apostolorum. Most of the religious brothers study at Regina Apostolorum while living at the center (all Legionaries live either at the center or the General house on Via Aurelia while studying philosophy and theology).

== History ==
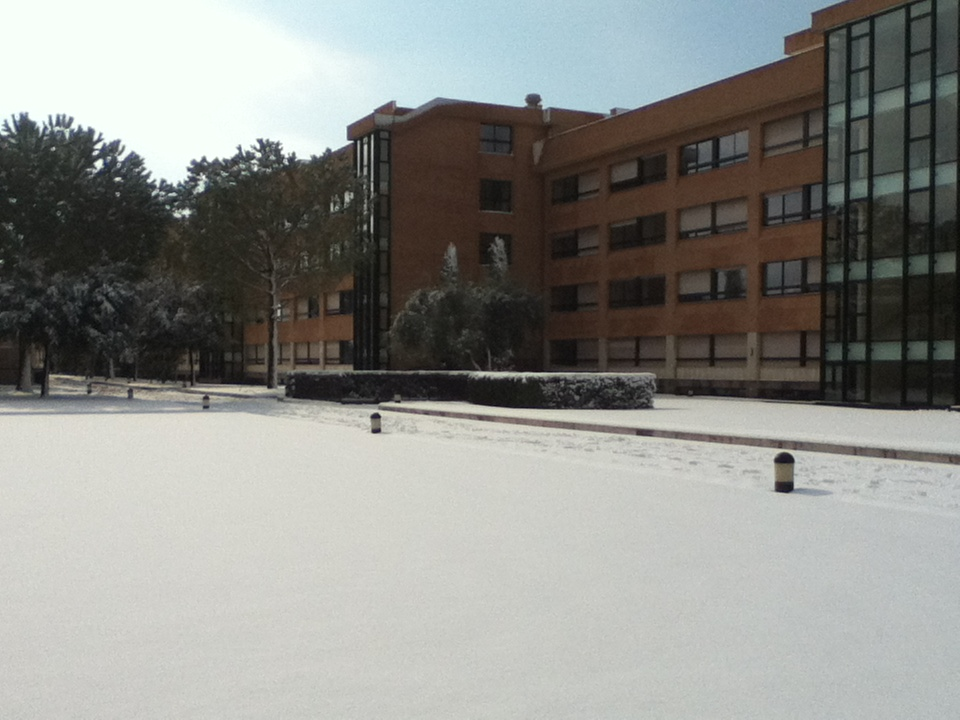
The courtyard of the Center for Higher Studies covered in snow.

In 1991, the Legion built a center capable of 300 on via Aurelia Antica. However in 1999 this was turned into a college for diocesan seminarians and the current campus was built.

Until 2018, the college was known as the Center for Higher Studies (Centro dei Studi Superiori) This nomenclature kept with the Legionaries of Christ custom of referring to their members' residences as centers (formation center, vocational center, center for apostolate, etc). Leadership adopted new nomenclature so that its name would follow naming pattern used by other seminaries in Rome.

== Events ==
Often diaconate ordinations and at times priestly ordinations of members of the Legion have been done in the center's chapel.
