= Paul Vitz =

American psychologist (born 1935)

- Born: Paul Clayton Vitz; August 27, 1935 (age 91); Toledo, Ohio, US
- Spouse: Evelyn ("Timmie") Birge Vitz
- Children: Rebecca (Vitz) Cherico, Jessica (Vitz) McGibbon, Fr. Daniel Vitz IVE, Peter T. Vitz, Michael G. Vitz, Anna (Vitz) Price

Academic background
- Education: University of Michigan; Stanford University

Academic work
- Discipline: Cognitive Psychology
- Sub-discipline: Psychology and Religion, Psychology and Art
- Institutions: New York University
- Notable ideas: Selfism

Paul Clayton Vitz (born August 27, 1935) is an American psychologist who is a Senior Scholar at Divine Mercy University in Sterling, Virginia. He is emeritus professor of psychology at New York University. His work focuses primarily on the relationship between psychology and Christianity.

== Career ==
Paul Vitz was born on August 27, 1935, in Toledo, Ohio. He moved to Minneapolis, and later to Cincinnati, Ohio, which he considers his hometown. He was raised as a nominal Presbyterian. He graduated Phi Beta Kappa with a BA in psychology from the University of Michigan in 1957 and with a PhD in psychology from Stanford University in 1962.

From 1962 to 1964, Vitz taught at Pomona College. He held a post-doc at Stanford University, from 1964 to 1965. He was hired in the fall of 1965 as assistant professor in the psychology department of New York University. He received tenure there in the fall of 1972. His research was focused on perceptual and cognitive psychology, especially sequential pattern learning and visual form perception and preferred levels of stimulus complexity. Vitz also has an ongoing interest in psychology and art as shown in a co-authored work: "Modern Art and Modern Science: The Parallel Analysis of Vision", 1984. His interest in visual art has also focused on the two brain hemispheres and on a hierarchical model of image construction in visual perception.

His career changed markedly in the mid-seventies with his conversion from atheism to Christianity and later, in 1979, to Catholicism. His first book, "Psychology as Religion: The Cult of Self-Worship", 1977 (2nd ed., 1994), critiqued humanistic psychology (e.g. Rogers, Maslow) for its radical individualism, neglect of interpersonal relationships, and its assumption that self-actualization was the meaning of life for everyone. In the early 1980s Vitz was involved in the national controversy over neglect of religion, especially Christianity in public school textbooks. He authored "Censorship: Evidence of bias in our children's textbooks", 1984. During this decade he also wrote articles on Christian approaches to the work of Sigmund Freud, resulting in his book "Sigmund Freud's Christian Unconscious", 1988. This book provides much historical and biographical evidence for Freud's deep and lifelong involvement with and ambivalence toward Christianity, especially Catholicism. It also shows that the significance of this concern with Christianity has been widely neglected and ignored by his biographers. Another interest of his at this time was moral development involving a critique of rational/cognitive approaches, e.g. Kohlberg, and an emphasis on stories. See "The use of stories in moral development: New psychological reasons for an old education method", Amer. Psychologist, 1990. In the 1980s and especially in the 90's his work turned to personality theory and Christianity and to the psychological importance of fathers. The latter culminated in a book on what Vitz claims are the psychological factors which produce atheism, "Faith of the Fatherless: The Psychology of Atheism", 1999 and a 2nd ed. in 2013. He has made basic contributions as an editor to "A Catholic Christian Meta-Model of the Person", 2020 and to "The Complementarity of Women and Men", 2021. He is presently working on the origin of human consciousness, the relevance of the soul for psychology, and on the consequences of analog and digital coding.

At New York University he was promoted to the rank of full Professor, retiring from there in 2003 as professor emeritus. He is now Senior Scholar/Professor in the Institute for the Psychological Sciences, Divine Mercy University.

== Personal life ==
Vitz is married to Evelyn Birge Vitz, a professor of French at New York University specializing in medieval studies and in the performance of medieval and other narrative works. They have six children and twenty-three grandchildren.

== Publications ==
- Vitz, Paul C. (1977). Psychology as religion : the cult of self-worship. Grand Rapids: Eerdmans. ISBN 0802816967.
- Vitz, Paul C.; Glimcher, Arnold B. (1983). Modern art and modern science : the parallel analysis of vision. New York, N.Y.: Praeger. ISBN 0030624665.
- Vitz, Paul C. (1986). Censorship : evidence of bias in our children's textbooks. Ann Arbor, Mich.: Servant Books. ISBN 089283305X.
- Vitz, Paul C. (1988). Sigmund Freud's Christian unconscious. New York: Guilford Press. ISBN 0898626730.
- Vitz, Paul C. (1998). Defending the Family: A Sourcebook. Steubenville, Oh: Catholic Social Science Press. ISBN 1888462000.
- Vitz, Paul C. (1999). Faith of the fatherless : the psychology of atheism. Dallas: Spence Pub. ISBN 1890626252.
- Vitz, Paul C.; Felch, Susan M., eds. (2006). The self : beyond the postmodern crisis. Wilmington, De.: ISI Books. ISBN 1932236864.
- Vitz, Paul C.; Kamorina, T. (2014). "A four-stage hierarchical model of image construction and drawing production: Evidence from visual hallucinations, development and pathologic regression in art". International Journal of Neuropsychotherapy. 2 (1): 2–26. doi:10.12744/ijnpt.2014.0002-0026.
- Vitz, Paul C. (2017). The origin of consciousness in the integration of analog (right hemisphere) & digital (left hemisphere) codes. Journal of Consciousness Exploration & Research, 8(11), pp. 881–906.
- Vitz, Paul C., Nordling W. J., & Titus, C.S. (Eds.) (2020). A Catholic Christian Meta-Model of the Person: Integration with psychology and mental health practice. Sterling, VA: Divine Mercy University Press. (Expanded Reason Award, 2020. Benedict XVI Foundation, Rome.)
- Vitz, Paul C. (Ed.) (2021). The complementarity of women and men: Philosophy, theology, psychology and art. Washington, D.C.: Catholic University of America Press.

== See also ==
- Postmodern psychology
