= Luis Garza =

Mexican priest

Luis Garza Medina is a Roman Catholic priest of the Legion of Christ who previously served as its Vicar General, Territorial Director of North America, and Spiritual Director in Manila, Philippines. Medina currently resides in Monterrey, Mexico.

== Biography ==
Garza was born and raised in Monterrey, Mexico. He has a bachelor's degree in industrial engineering from Stanford University. He entered the Legion of Christ in 1978.

Garza was Vicar General of the Legion from 1992 until 2011. In 2006, Garza investigated serious charges of sexual abuse of minors by Legion founder Marcial Maciel, which were later verified.

Garza left the post of Vicar General in 2011 in order to take up the role of Territorial Director for North America.

From 2014 to 2016 he was a local apostolate coordinator of Everest Academy in Manila, Philippines.

His older brother Dionisio Garza Medina is the CEO of Tenedora Topaz. His younger sister Roberta Garza Medina is the editor of Milenio magazine in Mexico City.

== Controversies ==
In a civil lawsuit that was later dropped, Garza was listed among the accused of alleged sexual abuse of teenage boy in the early 1990s. Following up on these accusations, the Legion of Christ carried out a canonical investigation entrusted to an independent investigator who concluded that "the accusations against Father Luis Garza were not credible," and that he should be "free from suspicion and should not be restricted in any way in the exercise of his priestly ministry."

Garza was named in the Pandora Papers, where it was reported that he had $300 Million in trusts in New Zealand under his name.
