= Sexual abuse cases of Marcial Maciel =

Clerical sexual abuse cases in Mexico

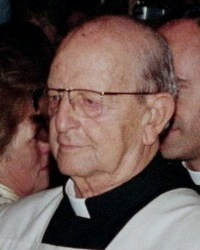
Fr. Marcial Maciel LC (late 2004)

Marcial Maciel was the founding leader of the Legion of Christ, then based in Mexico, and its general director from 1941 to January 2005. Since the 1970s the prominent Mexican Roman Catholic priest had sexually abused at least 60 minors. and fathered six children by three women. Described as a charismatic leader and the "greatest fundraiser of the modern Roman Catholic church", he was successful in recruiting seminarians at a time of declining priestly vocations. Maciel was the "highest ranking priest ever disciplined because of sexual abuse allegations."

Formal charges against Maciel were filed by nine men with the Vatican in 1998. The scandal related to Maciel was linked with the wider series of international Catholic sex abuse cases being reported in the Catholic Church. Church authorities were criticized for the slow pace of investigations, with conjecture that it was because Maciel was close to Pope John Paul II and had well-placed connections among senior clergy. Putting forward his age, John Paul II's Vatican chose not to prosecute Maciel, but in 2006 Pope Benedict XVI forced him to retire from active ministry. Maciel died in 2008.

In March 2010, the Legion of Christ in a communique acknowledged that Maciel had committed "reprehensible actions", including sexual abuse. The communique stated that "given the gravity of his faults, we cannot take his person as a model of Christian or priestly life." The Legion had long denied the allegations against the priest and, since Maciel's forced retirement in 2006 had not made any official statement one way or the other. On May 1, 2010, the Vatican denounced Maciel's actions and said that the Legion needed reform; a Papal Delegate was designated to oversee the organization and its governance.

In 2019, the Legion of Christ released a report on abuse committed by Maciel and other priests. Notably, the Legion pointed to Cardinal Sodano, Cardinal Secretary of State from 1991 to 2006, as being responsible for hiding the accusations against Maciel from others in the Curia. Sodano retired as Dean of the College of Cardinals the same day that the Legion made its report.

== History of investigations ==
=== 1956 investigation ===
Maciel, a Mexican priest who was the general director of the Legion of Christ, which he founded in 1941, was investigated several times for his behavior. In 1956, the Vatican had him removed as superior and investigated allegations of drug (morphine) abuse. After interviewing members of the then-small congregation, the Vatican cleared him. Maciel was reinstated in February 1959. There are no records of any members reporting sexual abuse at that time. However, since then two seminarians reported that they had lied to investigators in 1956; they did not report having been abused because Maciel had earlier had them take a vow never to speak ill of him.

=== Accusations since the 1970s ===
Since the 1970s, Maciel has been twice accused of having repeatedly sexually abused other congregation members, including young children. His accusers include a priest, a guidance counselor, a professor, an engineer, a lawyer, and a former priest who became a university professor. These two Spaniards and seven Mexicans described themselves as former members of a favored group, known as the "apostolic schoolboys". They said that the abuse allegedly occurred over three decades, beginning in the 1940s in Spain and Italy. As promising boys and young men, the Mexicans had been taken there to be educated. They said the abuse involved some 30 boys and young men, and extended over at least three decades.

=== Nine accusers ===
In 1998, the nine men above filed formal charges against Maciel at the Vatican. One man subsequently retracted his story, claiming it had been a fabrication intended to damage the Legion; the other eight continue to maintain their allegations. The accusers described how Maciel would feign having an illness in his groin and falsely claim to have been given papal permission to receive help massaging away the pain. Maciel and the Legion originally denied the accusations. The Congregation for the Doctrine of the Faith (CDF), led by then-Cardinal Joseph Ratzinger (who later became Pope Benedict XVI), examined the allegations. The Congregation told the plaintiffs the following year that Maciel would not be prosecuted because of his age.

=== Reopening the case ===
In 2004, the plaintiffs were informed by letter that the Congregation for the Doctrine of the Faith had decided to reopen the investigation against Maciel. Shortly after, Maciel stepped down as General Director of the Legion at the Ordinary General Chapter held in January 2005. Fr Alvaro Corcuera was elected by the same General Chapter as the new General Director.

=== Retirement ===
On 19 May 2006, the Vatican published a communique for the press, instructing Maciel to retire from active ministry to a life of "prayer and penitence", The Legion's vows of obedience which required members to maintain secrecy, impermeability, and refrain from giving any in the Legion possible humility was also lifted by Pope Benedict XVI in December 2007. Despite all this, Maciel was never laicized. He moved to a house for priests in Jacksonville, Florida, where he died in 2008. Maciel and the Legion continued to deny all accusations until his death.

On 3 September 2009, Fr. Julio Marti and Fr. Scott Reilly (the territorial directors of the Legion in the US and Canada) made a formal apology on behalf of the Legion. They said:

We are deeply saddened and sorry, and we sincerely ask for forgiveness from God and from those who have been hurt through this. We also regret that our inability to detect, and thus accept and remedy, Father Maciel's failings has caused even more suffering.

In 2014 the General Chapter of the Legionaries of Christ made a more formal and extensive apology.

=== Further revelations ===
On 3 February 2009 The New York Times reported:

The Legionaries of Christ, an influential Roman Catholic religious order, have been shaken by new revelations that their founder, who died a year ago, had an affair with a woman and fathered a daughter just as he and his thriving conservative order were winning the acclaim of Pope John Paul II.

This has been confirmed by the Legion of Christ. The BBC reported that Maciel had six children by three women, two of whom lived in Mexico and one in Switzerland.

The Rev. Thomas V. Berg LC, Executive Director of the Westchester Institute for Ethics and the Human Person, formally apologized to the victims of Maciel, "In shock, sorrow, and with a humbled spirit, I want to express my deepest sorrow for anyone who, in any way, has been hurt by the moral failings of Fr. Maciel." A few weeks after the scandal broke, Berg left the Legion of Christ to become a diocesan priest, transferring the Westchester Institute to the Archdiocese of New York.

=== Civil suit on behalf of six Maciel children ===
In July 2009, attorney José Bonilla was appointed to represent three of a possible total of six of Maciel's children in a civil suit to recover Maciel's estate. The lawyer claimed that Maciel owned several properties in Mexico and around the world in his own name.

Media in Spain had reported an interview with a woman who had a child with Maciel more than 20 years ago; she lived in a luxury apartment in Madrid which Maciel had purchased for her. Norma Hilda Baños said that she was abused as a minor by Maciel and later became pregnant by him. She bore and raised his daughter.

=== Reaction of Archbishop O'Brien ===
In the wake of these revelations, Archbishop Edwin O'Brien of Baltimore told his archdiocesan newspaper that the order must offer "full disclosure of [Maciel's] activities and those who are complicit in them, or knew of them, and of those who are still refusing to offer disclosure." He said that the order's finances should also be subject to "objective scrutiny". He described Maciel "a man with an entrepreneurial genius who, by systematic deception and duplicity, used our faith to manipulate others for his own selfish ends." He criticized the "good deal of secrecy in [Maciel's] own life ... [and] in the structures he created." The archbishop welcomed the Vatican's decision in the following March to conduct an apostolic visitation of the Legionaries, and said that the order's abolition "should be on the table".

== Apostolic visitation ==
In early 2009, the Vatican ordered an apostolic visitation of the institutions of the Legionaries of Christ following disclosures of sexual impropriety by Maciel. Vatican authorities named five bishops from five different countries, each one in charge of investigating the Legionaries in a particular part of the world:

- Ricardo Watty Urquidi, Bishop of Tepic, Mexico, in charge of Mexico and Central America, where the Legion has 44 houses, 250 priests and 115-120 religious seminarians;
- Charles J. Chaput, Archbishop of Denver, in charge of the United States and Canada, where the Legion has 24 houses, 130 priests and 260 religious seminarians;
- Giuseppe Versaldi, Bishop of Alessandria, in charge of Italy, Israel, the Philippines, and South Korea, where the Legion has 16 houses, 200 priests and 420 religious seminarians (in Italy 13, 168 and 418 respectively);
- Ricardo Ezzati Andrello, Archbishop of Concepción, Chile, in charge of Chile, Argentina, Colombia, Brazil and Venezuela, where the Legion has 20 houses, 122 priests and 122 religious seminarians;
- Ricardo Blázquez Pérez, Bishop of Bilbao, Spain, in charge of Spain, France, Germany, Switzerland, Ireland, Holland, Poland, Austria and Hungary, where the Legion has 20 houses, 105 priests, and 160 religious seminarians.

They met with the pope to report on the visitation in April 2010, and the Vatican issued a statement on 1 May 2010.

In December 2019, the organization accepted responsibility for 175 cases of child sexual abuse by 33 priests, including 60 minors who were abused by Maciel. The organization also stated that former Vatican Secretary of State Angelo Sodano led efforts to cover up the abuse committed by Maciel and other clergy.

== Formal denunciation by the Vatican ==
On 1 May 2010, the Vatican named a delegate and appointed a commission to review the Legionaries of Christ. In a statement, the Vatican denounced Maciel for creating a "system of power" that enabled him to lead an "immoral" double life "devoid of scruples and authentic religious sentiment" and allowed him to abuse young boys for decades unchecked.

The "very serious and objectively immoral acts" of Marcial Maciel, which were "confirmed by incontrovertible testimonies", represent "true crimes and manifest a life without scruples or authentic religious sentiment," the Vatican said. The Vatican said the Legion created a "mechanism of defense" around Maciel to shield him from accusations and suppress damaging witnesses from reporting abuse. "It made him untouchable," the Vatican said. The statement decried the "lamentable disgracing and expulsion of those who doubted" Maciel's virtue. The Vatican statement did not address whether the Legion's current leadership will face any sanctions. Actions taken by the current Legion leadership will be scrutinized; but no specific sanctions were mentioned. The Vatican acknowledged the "hardships" faced by Maciel's accusers through the years when they were ostracized or ridiculed, and commended their "courage and perseverance to demand the truth".

As a result of the visitation, Pope Benedict XVI named Archbishop (later Cardinal) Velasio De Paolis on 9 July 2010 as the Papal Delegate to oversee the Legion and its governance.

== See also ==
- Child sexual abuse
- Religious abuse
- Spiritual abuse
