= Regnum Christi =

International Catholic organization

- Coat of arms
- Abbreviation: RC
- Formation: January 3, 1959; 67 years ago
- Headquarters: Rome, Italy
- Website: https://www.regnumchristi.com

The Regnum Christi Federation (Latin: Regnum Christi Foederationis) is an international Catholic organization founded by Marcial Maciel in 1959. It is made up of the religious congregation known as the Legionaries of Christ, a lay Catholic division, and two societies of apostolic life: the Consecrated Women of Regnum Christi and the Lay Consecrated Men of Regnum Christi.

Maciel led the federation until 2005, when controversies began to emerge over cult-like tendencies within the federation. In 2006, Maciel was investigated by the Holy See and suspended from his ministry, initially over breaches of celibacy, and following public revelations later confirmed as sustained, over sexual abuse of minors. After Maciel's death, and following more revelations, Pope Benedict XVI ordered an apostolic visitation of the Legion of Christ 2009.

The investigation and reform of the Legionaries of Christ led to a reevaluation of the statutes of Regnum Christi that were written in 2004, and a deep reflection on the nature of Regnum Christi as a whole. Members from all states in life participated in that reflection, as individuals and in groups, under the guidance of officials from the Holy See. The new statutes of the Regnum Christi Federation were approved by the Holy See on May 31, 2019.

== History ==
=== Beginnings and revised statutes ===
The federation was founded by Marcial Maciel in 1959. The first draft of the statutes for Regnum Christi was written and promulgated the same year. The priestly branch, the Legionaries of Christ, had been founded previously by Maciel in 1941. The lay branch was founded in 1968, the consecrated women branch in 1969 and the lay consecrated men branch in 1975.

On November 25, 2004 a revised set of statutes was approved for Regnum Christi. These statutes defined the goals, spirituality, and structure of Regnum Christi. Maciel led the federation until 2005.

=== Controversies emerge ===
The Legion of Christ and Regnum Christi have received criticism both from within and outside the Catholic Church. In the early 2000s, 77 former students from a Regnum Christi-run high school in Wakefield, Rhode Island, made a plea to the Vatican to close the school, citing psychological anguish, rigid schedules, manipulation, emotional abuse and isolation from families as they were forced to live like nuns. The women made their experiences public on a blog titled "49 Weeks a Year" as this was the amount of time they would be expected to spend at the boarding school, spending only 3 weeks with their families.

==== Abuse by Marcial Maciel ====
The congregation's founder, Marcial Maciel, led the federation until 2005. In 2006, he was investigated by the Holy See and suspended from his ministry, initially over breaches of celibacy, and following public revelations later confirmed as sustained, over sexual abuse of minors. Maciel died in 2008, aged 87. After Maciel's death, and following more revelations, Pope Benedict XVI ordered an apostolic visitation of the Legion of Christ 2009. At the conclusion of that visitation, Cardinal Velasio de Paolis was delegated to conduct a visitation of Regnum Christi.

The investigation and reform of the Legionaries of Christ led to a reevaluation of the statutes of Regnum Christi that were written in 2004, and a deep reflection on the nature of Regnum Christi as a whole. Members from all states in life participated in that reflection, as individuals and in groups, under the guidance of officials from the Holy See. A greater, fuller, and more nuanced vision of Regnum Christi emerged in that process, culminating in the 2019 statutes. The statutes of the Regnum Christi Federation were approved by the Holy See on May 31, 2019, after an extensive investigation and discernment on the part of the Holy See who led Regnum Christi and all of its federated institutions through a deep reformation and renewal process that began in 2009. Regnum Christi is dedicated to promoting the Catholic faith and evangelization. Their motto is "Thy Kingdom Come."

On May 1, 2010, the Vatican issued a statement condemning Maciel as "immoral" and acknowledging that Maciel had committed "true crimes". Pope Benedict also said he would appoint a delegate to reform the Legionaries’ charism, spirituality and constitutions. Pope Francis proceeded to revolutionize the Legion of Christ. Under the guidance of Cardinal Velasio De Paolis, the congregation announced the order's complete restructuring at its Extraordinary General Chapter in Rome in January 2014.

=== Federation reform ===
A Vatican led investigation into the history of the Legionaries of Christ and Regnum Christi began in 2009. It led to sweeping reforms and a firm commitment to renewal and the eradication of sexual abuse in the organization. Codes of conduct are established for Legionaries of Christ, consecrated men and women, and for lay members who have contact with minors through Regnum Christi. Procedures for prevention and immediate action are also in place so that any and all allegations are received, dealt with, and reported to the proper authorities. These policies and procedures are subject to the standards of accreditation of Praesidium, a specialized external third-party institution.

In a November 21, 2011 letter, Cardinal Velasio de Paolis asked the consecrated in Regnum Christi to edit their core set of norms, and took force away from a more extensive set of norms. He set up a small commission to revise them. This process led to the founding of the Societies of Apostolic Life of the Consecrated Women and Lay Consecrated Men, each with their own autonomous governance. The approved configuration of the Regnum Christi Federation in 2019 included the Legionaries of Christ as members of Regnum Christi for the first time.

A reorganization of Regnum Christi emerged thereafter with Vatican oversight, culminating in the 2019 statutes. The statutes of the Regnum Christi Federation were approved by the Holy See on May 31, 2019, after an extensive investigation and discernment on the part of the Holy See.

== Spirituality ==
The spirituality of Regnum Christi is Christ-centered, springing from a personal experience of Christ's love and overflowing in an ongoing and ever-deepening relationship with him. It is presented in number 12 of the statutes: "Our spirituality is centered above all on Jesus Christ and born from experiencing his love. We seek to respond to our Friend and Lord with a personal, real, passionate and faithful love. Through the action of the Holy Spirit, we are sons and daughters in the Son who becomes the center, standard and model of our life. We learn to encounter him in the Gospel, the Eucharist, the cross and our neighbor."

== Activities ==
According to the National Catholic Reporter, (at least as of 2010) members of Regnum Christi participated in study groups discussing the wisdom of Maciel's letters. Their highest level members, lay celibates, live in communities and focus on fundraising.

Regnum Christi members live their mission through their Christian witness and through apostolic work. Their mission is carried out through various programs, apostolates, and institutions, including youth work, schools, youth missions, retreats, and other works in parishes or dioceses.

As of 2023, there were just over 20,000 members in more than 30 countries.

== Organization ==
Among the members of Regnum Christi, there are lay members, both single and married, priests and brothers who are members of the religious congregation of the Legionaries of Christ, and lay consecrated men and women who each have their own pontifically recognized society for apostolic life. The Regnum Christi Federation is governed collegially at the general and territorial levels by a college made up of members of the Legionaries of Christ, the Consecrated Women, Lay Consecrated Men, and lay members.

=== Legionaries of Christ ===
The Legionaries of Christ are a Catholic religious congregation made up of priests and brothers (seminarians). They are part of the Regnum Christi Federation. The mission of the Legionaries of Christ is to form apostles, Christian leaders at the service of the Church.

=== ECyD ===
ECYD (Encounters, Convictions, Your Decisions) is the Regnum Christi charism lived by adolescents. Members make a pledge of friendship with Christ and with each other, to transform the world for Christ.

=== Lay members ===
The lay members of Regnum Christi embrace a vocation from God to live their baptismal commitments in the midst of today’s world, according to the charism of Regnum Christi, in a dynamic relationship of love with Jesus Christ. Their mission is to make the Kingdom of Christ present in today’s world so that all people have the chance to encounter Christ and experience his love. Lay Regnum Christi members make Christ’s kingdom present in the world and transform daily realities with the light of the Gospel, especially in their family, professional, and social lives. The Rule of Life for lay members of Regnum Christi was approved by the Holy See in 2019.

=== Consecrated Women of Regnum Christi ===
The Consecrated Women of Regnum Christi are a Society of Apostolic Life and part of the Regnum Christi Federation that is made up of lay women who dedicate their lives fully to Christ through the evangelical vows of poverty, chastity and obedience lived within international communities.

The Consecrated Women of Regnum Christi was founded on 8 December 1969 in Mexico when three women, Margarita Estrada, Guadalupe Magaña, and Graciela Magaña, made private vows of poverty, chastity and obedience. For a long time the government of the Consecrated Women was under the Legionaries of Christ. However, after an apostolic visitation, Cardinal Velasio de Paolis decided that they would be better served by their own internal government. On 17 May 2012, Gloria Rodriguez was named the new leader after consulting the members. On November 25, 2018, they were approved by the Holy See, who established the Consecrated Women and the Lay Consecrated Men of Regnum Christi as Societies of Apostolic Life.

The Consecrated Women of Regnum Christi share their spirituality with the rest of Regnum Christi but profess it in their own particular way.

=== Lay Consecrated Men of Regnum Christi ===
The Lay Consecrated Men of Regnum Christi are part of the Regnum Christi Federation made up of lay men who dedicate themselves full-time to apostolate. They were formed on April 13, 1975 by Marcial Maciel with Álvaro Corcuera (who later became the general director of the Legionaries of Christ and Regnum Christi) as one of the founding members. For a long time the government of the consecrated men was under the Legionaries of Christ. However, after an apostolic visitation, Card. Velasio de Paolis decided that they would be better served by their own internal government.
