= Canonical visitation =

Apostolic function

In the Catholic Church, a canonical visitation is the act of an ecclesiastical superior who in the discharge of his office visits persons or places with a view to maintaining faith and discipline and of correcting abuses. A person delegated to carry out such a visitation is called a visitor. When, in exceptional circumstances, the Holy See delegates an apostolic visitor (or visitors) "to evaluate an ecclesiastical institute such as a seminary, diocese, or religious institute [...] to assist the institute in question to improve the way in which it carries out its function in the life of the Church," this is known as an apostolic visitation.

== Usage ==
The practice was reaffirmed in the Catholic Church by the Council of Trent (1545 to 1563) in these words:

Patriarchs, primates, metropolitans and bishops shall not fail to visit their respective dioceses either personally, or if they be lawfully hindered, by their Vicar-general or visitor; if they shall not be able on account of its extent, to make the visitation of the whole [diocese] annually, they shall visit at least the greater part thereof, so that the whole shall be completed [with]in two years, either by themselves or by their visitors.

Of the purpose of visitation the Council says:

But the principal object of all the visitations shall be to lead to sound and orthodox doctrine, by banishing heresies; to maintain good morals, and to correct such as are evil; to animate the people, by exhortations and admonitions, to religion, peacefulness, and innocence; and to establish such other things as to the prudence of the visitors shall seem for the profit of the faithful, according as time, place and opportunity shall allow.

=== Rights of visitation ===
The right of visitation belongs to all prelates who have ordinary jurisdiction over persons in the external forum. The pope through his delegates may institute a visitation throughout the world, patriarchs, primates, metropolitans, bishops, a vicar apostolic and a vicar capitular or administrator of a vacant diocese, all in their respective territories, religious superiors within their own jurisdiction. A prelate nullius enjoys this right in conjunction with the neighbouring bishop, whose precepts in case of disagreement will prevail. Visitation does not, however, fall within the province of a vicar-general unless he be specially commissioned by the bishop. A metropolitan is not permitted to visit the dioceses of his suffragan bishops save for reasons approved in a provincial synod, and then only after the visitation of his own diocese has been completed.

The canonical visitation of a diocese is incumbent on the bishop personally unless lawfully hindered. A bishop may visit the various parts of his diocese as often as he chooses. According to the Council of Trent he must do so every year if possible, or at least every two years. A decree by the Sacred Congregation of the Consistory was A remotissima, of 31 December 1909. The Third Plenary Council of Baltimore required a bishop to visit every part of his diocese at least once every three years, not only that he may administer the sacrament of Confirmation, but likewise that he may know his people.

Regulars in matters pertaining to the cure of souls and divine worship are subject to episcopal visitation and correction. As delegate of the Apostolic See, a bishop may also visit exempt places, but may punish delinquents therein only when the regular superior, being duly notified, fails to do so. Religious communities of nuns are visited by the bishop either by virtue of his own right or as delegate of the Holy See.

Religious superiors also visit canonically institutions and persons subject to them, each observing the constitution and customs of his own order. The efforts of female religious superiors in visiting their houses are directed chiefly to promoting zeal and discipline; their authority is confined to correcting minor breaches of rule, since they are devoid of canonical jurisdiction. Difficulties beyond their power to settle are reported to the bishop or other lawful superior.

=== Practical matters ===
The visitation comprises persons, places, and things. It is an examination into the conduct of persons, viz. clergy, nuns, and laity; into the condition of churches, cemeteries, seminaries, convents, hospitals, asylums, etc., with their furnishing and appurtenances, into the administration of church property, finances, records, state of religion: briefly, it is a complete investigation of the spiritual and temporal affairs of the diocese. The visitor hears complaints, investigates crimes, sees whether pastors and others properly discharge their duties, and inquires into the private conduct or morals of clergy and laity.

The episcopal visitation should be a paternal investigation of diocesan matters. Formal trials and judicial penalties consequently will not be common: from such, should they be made use of, a suspensive appeal may be taken. Otherwise an appeal from decrees promulgated in visitation will beget merely a devolutive effect. The laws made should be enforced, and an authentic account of the entire visitation should be preserved in the diocesan archives as an official record, as well as to enable the bishop in his visit ad limina to render to the Holy See an accurate report of conditions in his diocese. This report to the pope is to be signed not only by the bishop, but likewise by one of the associate visitors. A bishop or other visitor, content with hospitality, will accept no offering for the visitation.

The Pontifical prescribes the ceremonies to be observed in a formal visitation of a parish. At the door of the church the bishop in cappa magna kisses the crucifix, receives holy water, and is incensed; then proceeding to the sanctuary he kneels till a prescribed prayer is sung. Ascending the altar the bishop gives his solemn episcopal blessing. A sermon follows in which the bishop refers to the purpose of the visitation. Later he imparts the indulgence that he is empowered to grant. Putting on a black cope and simple mitre, the bishop recites certain prayers for the deceased bishops of the diocese. The procession then proceeds to the cemetery if nearby, otherwise to some convenient place in the church where a catafalque shall have been erected: there prayers are offered for all the faithful departed. The ceremony is terminated on returning to the sanctuary by still another prayer for the dead. White vestments being substituted for black, the bishop examines the tabernacle and contents (blessing the people with the ciborium), altars, baptismal font, sacred oils, confessionals, relics, sacristy, records, cemetery, edifices, etc. as above. Finally the Pontifical contains other prayers to be said privately before the departure of the bishop and his assistants.

== Recent apostolic visitations ==
In 2000, the Holy See ordered an apostolic visitation of the media network EWTN, run by the Franciscan nun Mother Angelica. Archbishop Roberto González Nieves of San Juan, Puerto Rico, was sent to investigate. Nieves determined that there were three distinct problems: the actual ownership of the network, the monastery's right to give property to EWTN, and, since she had never been elected, the legitimacy of Mother Angelica's authority.

An apostolic visitation team visited more than 200 U.S. seminaries and formation houses in 2005 and 2006 to evaluate issues of sexual morality. They concluded that U.S. Catholic seminaries and houses of priestly formation are generally healthy, but recommended a stronger focus on moral theology, increased oversight of seminarians and greater involvement of diocesan bishops in the formation process.

In a bid to find out why numbers have decreased so drastically over the last 40 years, the Vatican Congregation for Institutes of Consecrated Life and Societies of Apostolic Life announced an apostolic visitation of US religious women's institutes. The study was complete in 2011.

In 2010 the Vatican ordered an apostolic visitation of the institutions of the Legionaries of Christ following disclosures of sexual abuses by the order's late founder, Father Marcial Maciel Degollado.

On Monday, May 31, 2010, Pope Benedict XVI, in dealing with another large-scale child sex abuse scandal, ordered the formation of a panel of nine members (including two nuns, the then archbishops of Toronto, Ottawa, Boston, and New York, and the archbishop emeritus of Westminster) to investigate the Irish church hierarchy's handling of the sex abuse scandal there.

Archbishop George Lucas of Omaha, USA asked James J. Conn to conduct a visitation of the Intercessors of the Lamb community during May 2010.

== See also ==
- Provincial episcopal visitor
- Visit ad limina
