= Marcial Maciel =

Mexican priest, founder of the Legion of Christ, sexual abuser

The Reverend Marcial Maciel LC
- 1st General Director of the Legion of Christ
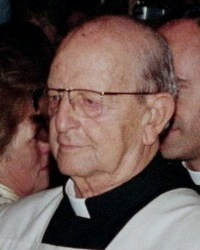
- Church: Latin Church
- Installed: January 3, 1941
- Term ended: January 20, 2005
- Successor: Álvaro Corcuera

Orders
- Ordination: November 26, 1944

Personal details
- Born: Marcial Maciel Degollado; 10 March 1920 Cotija, Michoacán, Mexico
- Died: 30 January 2008 (aged 87) Jacksonville, Florida, U.S.
- Buried: Michoacan
- Denomination: Roman Catholic

Marcial Maciel Degollado LC (March 10, 1920 – January 30, 2008) was a Mexican Catholic priest and sex offender. Maciel founded the Legion of Christ and the Regnum Christi movement. He was general director of the Legion from 1941 to 2005. Throughout most of his career, he was respected within the church as "the greatest fundraiser of the modern Roman Catholic church" and as a prolific recruiter of new seminarians.

Late in his life, Maciel was revealed to have been a longtime drug addict and alcoholic who sexually abused at least 60 boys and young men in his care. After his death, it came to light that he had also maintained sexual relationships with at least four women, one of whom was a minor at the time. He fathered as many as six children, two of whom he is alleged to have sexually abused.

In 2006, Pope Benedict XVI removed Maciel from active ministry, based on the results of an investigation by the Congregation for the Doctrine of the Faith in April 2005. Maciel was ordered "to conduct a reserved life of prayer and penance, renouncing every public ministry", but was never brought to court for his crimes. He died in 2008. On March 25, 2010, a communiqué on the Legion's website acknowledged as factual the "reprehensible actions" by Maciel, including sexual abuse of minor seminarians. In May 2010, the Vatican denounced Maciel's actions and appointed a Papal Delegate to oversee the order and its governance.

== Early life and training ==
Maciel was born in Cotija, Michoacán, Mexico, the youngest boy of nine children, to a family with connections within the Catholic Church in Mexico. Numerous relatives were priests, and four of his uncles were bishops. He had a troubled youth. His uncle molested him. His father ridiculed and beat him and encouraged his brothers to whip him. He sent the boy to work in the sugar fields to toughen him up, and years later Maciel told one of his own victims that mule drivers on his father's ranch had sexually abused him.

Maciel was the grand-nephew of Bishop Rafael Guízar y Valencia, who was canonized in 2007. There has been speculation that Maciel's scandalous conduct at age 18 contributed to Guizar's fatal heart attack. According to an investigative report:

The day before Bishop Guizar died, he had been heard shouting angrily at Marcial Maciel. He was giving his eighteen-year-old nephew a dressing down after two women had come to the bishop's house to complain about Maciel, who was their neighbor. Father Orozco, who was among the original group of boys to found the Legion of Christ in 1941, said he heard the women had complained about the "noise" Maciel was making with children he had brought into his home to teach religion. He said that the seminary officials blamed Maciel for his uncle's heart attack.

Maciel was expelled from two seminaries for reasons that have never been revealed, and became a priest only after one of his bishop uncles ordained him after private studies, on November 26, 1944, in Mexico City. The ordination was filmed and used in later years for publicity.

In 1941, Maciel founded the Legion of Christ, a Roman Catholic religious congregation of pontifical right, with the support of Francisco González Arias, Bishop of Cuernavaca. From the beginning, he served as its general director. In 1959 Maciel founded its lay arm Regnum Christi. All Legionaries were compelled "to take private vows, never to speak ill of Maciel or any superiors, and to report to their superiors anyone who did", facilitating a "cult of personality" according to Jason Berry. In Regnum Christi discussion groups, followers studied Maciel's letters.

Maciel wrote extensively on the formation of priests and other matters pertaining to Church governance. His main stated purpose for the Legion of Christ was to form and motivate enterprising lay members of the Catholic Church to take an active part in the Church's mission, in particular the members of Regnum Christi.

Through the Legion of Christ and the Regnum Christi, Maciel started many schools, a network of universities, and numerous charitable institutes.

== Earlier relations with the Vatican ==
Until his misdeeds became public, Maciel was well-regarded by the Papal See. He accompanied Pope John Paul II on his visits to Mexico in 1979, 1990, and 1993, and was appointed by the Pope to the Ordinary Assembly of the Synod of Bishops on the Formation of Priests in Circumstances of the Present Day (1990). He was a member of the Interdicasterial Commission for a Just Distribution of Clergy (1991), the Fourth General Conference of Latin American Bishops (CELAM) (1992), the Ordinary Assembly of the Synod of Bishops on the Consecrated Life and Its Role in the Church and in the World (1994), the Synod of Bishops' Special Assembly for America (1997) and (since 1994) as a permanent consultant to the Congregation for the Clergy. The golden anniversary of his priestly ordination was celebrated on 26 November 1994, with 57 Legionary priests ordained the day prior. Maciel served as Chancellor of the Pontifical Athenaeum Regina Apostolorum, which is based in Rome.

Maciel collaborated extensively with Pope John Paul II, in person and through his subordinates in the Legion of Christ. The pope admired Maciel for strictly adhering to the magisterium and the vocations to the Legion of Christ. Maciel received many donations from Mexico's richest families, much of which Maciel and the Legion passed on to the Vatican over many years.

When Pope Pius XII's archives were opened to the public in 2024, documents were found showing Maciel was protected by Giuseppe Pizzardo, the then No. 2 of the Congregation for the Doctrine of the Faith, from a judgement proposed by Giovanni Battista Scapinelli. A 1956 draft of the memo describes a measure originally requiring Maciel to cease any contact with his students and attend treatment for his morphine addiction, or be suspended a divinis. By October 2, 1956, the measure was edited to remove the prohibition against contact with seminarians, and later documents say further action against Maciel was superseded by "recommendations and interventions by high-ranking personalities".

== Fundraising ==
Jason Berry reports that early in his career, only two years into being a priest, Maciel visited the Vatican in 1946 to donate $10,000 from "several of Mexico's wealthiest families and its president, Miguel Aleman Valdes", appealing for support for scholarships for seminarians to study in Spain.

Maciel sought and received large donations from the wives of wealthy men such as Flora Barragán, "the widow of an industrialist" from Monterrey. Barragán reportedly donated $50 million to Maciel's Legion of Christ. According to José Barba, a "Mexico City college professor and former Legion seminarian",

“Maciel was 27 when he purchased the [first seminary] estate. In 1950 he began construction on the Instituto Cumbres, the first prep school, in Mexico City, the land for which Flora provided. That summer he also inaugurated Collegio Massimo in Rome. He was 30. In 1953 he tried to start construction of a college in Salamanca," but that was delayed a year.

The Garza-Sada families were another Monterrey group who donated to him. After the family patriarch, Dionisio Garza Garza, died, Maciel courted and received generous donations from his widow Roberta Garza. According to her daughter, the widow “never learned about his kids. He targeted women in Mexico of a certain class who were not allowed to work.... For cultured women who were bored, Maciel offered a sense of purpose.” A "continuing flow of money" to Maciel's projects also came from two children of Dionisio Garza Garza—Paulina and Luis.

Another benefactor was Josefita Pérez Jiménez, the daughter of a former Venezuelan dictator, who provided largesse for a seminary in Salamanca, Spain built in 1958 by Maciel. Boarders at Catholic schools were also a focus. According to Roberta Garza, ”They were grooming us for Regnum Christi — the Movement. If your family had money, power, influence, they wanted you. They kept telling me, 'God gave you everything, you must give back by fighting the forces of evil.'"

The highest level of membership in Maciel's Regnum Christi group, lay celibates, "live in communities and work relentlessly on fundraising".

== Sexual abuse cases ==
In 1976, Juan Vaca, a former student of Maciel, who states that Maciel molested him from the age of 12 to 24, wrote a 12-page letter to Maciel attacking him for his abuse and the "aberrant and sacrilegious abuse" of 20 other "good and gifted young boys." Vaca's letter was included in a dossier sent by Bishop John Raymond McGann to the Vatican suggesting that it investigate the accusation. "The letter was acknowledged; nothing happened." In 1978, when John Paul II became pope, the bishop and Vaca wrote again. "But again, nothing happened."

In 1989, Juan Vaca tried again, sending "a long, detailed letter" to John Paul "in a dossier ... via Vatican diplomatic pouch, again including his original statement naming Maciel's victims". He also asked for release from his vows of ordination arguing "that because of the abuse, he never should have been ordained". Several years later he was sent a document releasing him, "but on the Maciel charges—again, nothing".

On February 23, 1997, a report in The Hartford Courant "exposed a history of pedophilia" by Maciel involving nine victims who came forward to go on the record. The victims alleged that they had been abused as youths and young men by Maciel while studying under him in Spain and Rome in the 1940s and 1950s. The group, which included respectable academics and former priests, lodged formal charges at the Vatican in 1998. They were told the following year that the Congregation of the Doctrine of the Faith, then headed by Cardinal Joseph Ratzinger (later Pope Benedict XVI), was not moving forward with a direct prosecution. Whether Cardinal Ratzinger made this decision on his own or on orders by Pope John Paul II is not publicly known.

The Vatican refused to comment on the American report, while Maciel claimed innocence but refused to be interviewed. The Legion set up a website accusing the nine of fomenting a "conspiracy" against Maciel. American Roman Catholic luminaries came to the defense of Maciel and the Legion: William Donohue of the Catholic League called the men's claims "balderdash"; Father Richard John Neuhaus of First Things magazine called the charges false with "a moral certainty"; other defenders included John Paul II biographer and NBC Vatican analyst George Weigel; William Bennett, a former Reagan Education secretary; Mary Ann Glendon, a Harvard Law professor. The allegations were ignored by John Paul II who continued his praise of Maciel.

In December 2019, the Legion of Christ accepted responsibility for 175 cases of child sexual abuse by 33 priests, including 60 minors who were abused by Maciel. Former Vatican Secretary of State Angelo Sodano was accused of leading the effort to shield Maciel and other sexually abusive Legion of Christ clergy.

== Other illicit activities ==
=== Drug addiction ===
During his life, Maciel was the focus of several investigations of his behaviour. There were allegations of drug abuse, for which he was investigated in 1956; he was hospitalized for morphine addiction. He was also investigated for allegedly sexually abusing children. But there was no public notice of his suspension, and he was returned as head of the Congregation.

=== Mistresses and children ===
In July 2009, a Spanish daily published an interview with a woman who had had a child with Maciel in 1986 and was living in a luxury apartment in Madrid which Maciel had purchased for her. A day later, Mexican media reported that attorney José Bonilla would represent three of a possible total of six of Maciel's natural children in a civil lawsuit to recover Maciel's estate. The lawyer claimed that Maciel owned several properties in Mexico and around the world in his own name. According to José Bonilla, whose son was attacked by a teacher at one of Maciel's schools, Maciel took an adoptive son and a natural son—Omar and Raúl—on trips to Europe, using an assumed name of "Raúl Rivas". From the ages of 8 and 14 they were molested by him and were photographed in the process, but "as teenagers they began pushing him off".

In February 2009, news broke that Maciel had led a double life. Álvaro Corcuera, the General Director, visited each of the Legionary Territories and publicly apologized for Maciel's behaviour. Additionally, the Legion has publicly acknowledged that Maciel had fathered a daughter. As a result of all these acknowledgements, Pope Benedict XVI personally intervened and initiated a formal Vatican visitation of all legionary houses.

=== Plagiarism ===
In 1959 Maciel published a book, El salterio de mis días (The Psalter of My Days), which was widely read among members of the Legion and partially translated into English. It was a memoir of experiences of persecution.

On December 11, 2009, the Agencia Católica de Informaciones of Lima, Peru, sister agency of the Catholic News Agency, reported that a Legion of Christ internal memorandum acknowledged, without using the word "plagiarism", that the book copied the memoir of Luis Lucia, a Spanish journalist and Christian Democrat politician. Although the Legion's memorandum described Maciel's book as "a slight rewriting", a Spanish legionary familiar with it stated that it copied Lucia's memoir "80 percent in style and content."

Lucia's memoir was titled El salterio de mis horas (The Psalter of My Hours). He completed it in 1941 while a political prisoner of the Francoist Spanish State; it was published posthumously in Spain in 1956; that edition is believed to have been used by Maciel as the basis of his own book.

=== Forced retirement ===
In January 2005, Maciel was required to step down as head of the order. A few days before John Paul II died, Cardinal Ratzinger announced his intention of removing "filth" from the Church; many believed he was referring specifically to Maciel. After Ratzinger re-opened an investigation, the Vatican requested that Maciel withdraw from active ministry. In January 2006, Maciel stepped down as head of the Legion of Christ and tendered its leadership to long-time follower Álvaro Corcuera. In May 2006, Ratzinger, now as Pope Benedict XVI, disciplined him: the Congregation for the Doctrine of the Faith ordered Maciel to live "a reserved life of penitence and prayer, relinquishing any form of public ministry", and published a press communique to that effect. A canonical trial was however ruled out, officially because of his advanced age and poor health, and Maciel was never defrocked.

In 2007, the order was told to cancel the vows of its members to never criticize their superiors, and to inform on any dissent within the order. Maciel moved from Rome to a house he shared with other priests in Jacksonville, Florida, where he died on January 30, 2008, at age 87. He had a private funeral and was buried in his birthplace, Cotija, Michoacán.

Maciel never made any apologies, and continued to deny the allegations. Corcuera apologized to the victims both for Maciel's actions and the inaction of others.

== Later relations with the Vatican ==
Investigative journalist Jason Berry wrote in an April 2010 article in the National Catholic Reporter that the "charismatic" founder of the Legion of Christ "sent streams of money to Roman curia officials with a calculated end. Maciel was buying support for his group and defence for himself, should his secret life become known." Based on "former Legion insiders", Berry reports of large donations, "always in cash" and thus untraceable. "Fine wines and $1,000 Spanish hams" were delivered "to favored officials". "Pivotal supporter" Cardinal Angelo Sodano benefited from banquets for 200 members of his extended family when he became cardinal and again when he became secretary of State, and $5,000 to $10,000 fees when he gave speeches to the Legion. Stanisław Dziwisz, the "gatekeeper of attendance" to private papal masses, normally admitted "only a few world leaders", but allowed a family from Mexico to attend when they gave him $50,000. Maciel also "sent $1 million via Dziwisz in advance of a papal trip to Poland."

Berry and his late colleague Gerald Renner wrote the 2004 book Vows of Silence: The Abuse of Power in the Papacy of John Paul II, and the related TV documentary Vows of Silence on Maciel and the Legion of Christ. According to Berry, Maciel's key supporters, who provided him with a protective shield, included Cardinal Angelo Sodano, Vatican secretary of state (1991–2006) under popes John Paul II and Benedict XVI; Cardinal Eduardo Martínez Somalo, prefect of the Congregation for Institutes of Consecrated Life and Societies of Apostolic Life; and Cardinal Stanislaw Dziwisz, the Polish secretary of John Paul II (1978–2005).

The New York Times reported claims that even under Cardinal Joseph Ratzinger, who took an immediate interest in the case, the investigation into Maciel remained stalled. "Other factors delayed a reckoning. Some questioned the accounts of abuse; one of the original nine complainants recanted."

=== Denunciation by the Church ===
In March 2009, Pope Benedict XVI ordered an apostolic visitation of the Legionaries of Christ. Five bishops from five different countries, working independently of each other, conducted an extensive investigation which took them to nearly every one of the religious order's houses and on March 15, 2010, submitted their report to the Vatican. On March 25, 2010, the Legion of Christ and the Regnum Christ issued a joint statement acknowledging Maciel's history of sex abuse and apologized.

On May 1, 2010, after a two-day meeting in Rome with the bishops, the Vatican issued a statement on the report and announced that the Pope would name a delegate to the Legion and a visitator to Regnum Christi, because the "conduct of [Maciel] has given rise to serious consequences in the life and structure of the Legion, such as to require a process of profound re-evaluation." In its statement the Vatican denounced Maciel for having created a system of power that enabled him to lead an "immoral" double life "devoid of scruples and authentic religious meaning." The Vatican statement was unusually explicit in its denunciation of Maciel's crimes and deception.

The "very serious and objectively immoral acts" of Maciel, which were "confirmed by incontrovertible testimonies", represented "true crimes and manifest a life without scruples or authentic religious sentiment", the Vatican said. The Vatican also stated that the Legion created a "mechanism of defense" around Maciel to shield him from accusations and suppress damaging witnesses from reporting abuse. "It made him untouchable", the Vatican said. The statement decried the "lamentable disgracing and expulsion of those who doubted" Maciel's virtue. The Vatican statement did not address whether the Legion's leadership would face any sanctions. The Vatican acknowledged the "hardships" faced by Maciel's accusers through the years when they were ostracized or ridiculed, and commended their "courage and perseverance to demand the truth."

== See also ==
- Carlos Miguel Buela
