= Pontifical Athenaeum Regina Apostolorum =

Pontifical university in Rome, Italy

- Pontificio Ateneo Regina Apostolorum
- Motto: Latin: Veritatem Facientes in Caritate (Finding the Truth with Love)
- Type: Pontifical Athenaeum
- Established: 15 September 1993 (32 years ago)
- Rector: Rev. José E. Oyarzún, LC
- Location: Via degli Aldobrandeschi, 190; Rome, Italy; 41.880937°N 12.39953°E
- Website: www.upra.org

The Pontifical Athenaeum Regina Apostolorum (Italian: Pontificio Ateneo Regina Apostolorum) is an educational institute of the Catholic Church in Rome.

The Pontifical Athenaeum is directed by the Congregation of the Legionaries of Christ.

== History ==
The Athenaeum was canonically established by the Congregation for Catholic Education on 15 September 1993. On 11 July 1998, Pope John Paul II gave permission for the institution to style itself as a Pontifical University.

The Pontifical Athenaeum Regina Apostolorum educates priests and seminarians, religious, and lay people from all over the world. The training of competent and responsible students, an integral part of its mission, is the opportunity that the Athenaeum offers to the dioceses and countries of students.

== Faculties ==
Pictures of the Pontifical Athenaeum Regina Apostolorum
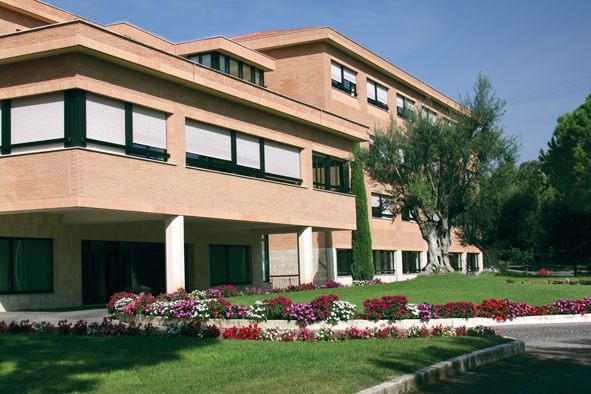
Outside

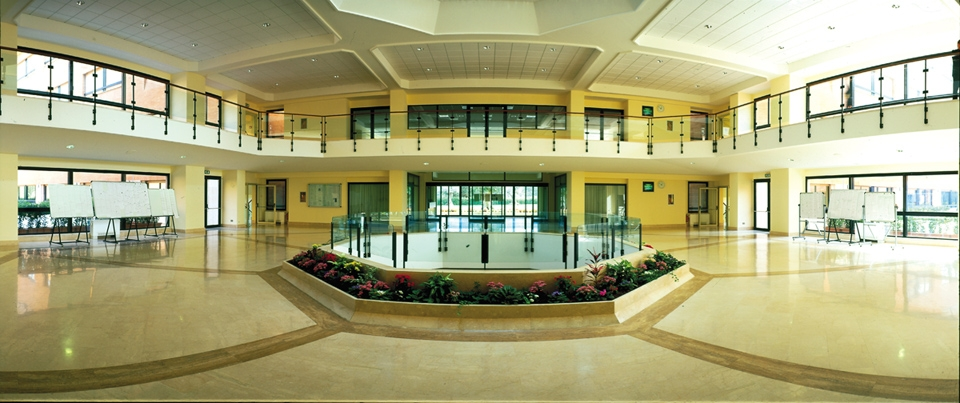
Inside

=== Theology ===
The Faculty of Theology aims to deepen the student's appreciation of the mystery of God and His plan of salvation in Jesus Christ, revealed in Sacred Scripture and transmitted by the Church under the guidance of the Holy Spirit.

Students are required to acquire a good understanding of Catholic doctrine, to be able to explain it with clarity as well as converse with other Christians and non-Christian contemporaries.

=== Philosophy ===
The academic activities of the Faculty of Philosophy are oriented towards finding solutions to pressing problems of humanity. It seeks to demonstrate the consistency of the demands of philosophical reason to the Christian vision and offer a rational instrument suited to theological speculation, to dialogue with today's pluralistic world. The mission of the Faculty is threefold:

- provide training in serious and organic formation in philosophy;
- prepare students to approach the study of theology in a rigorous and thoughtful manner;
- answer the call of the new evangelisation and the questions posed by contemporary cultures.

=== Bioethics ===
As the first of its kind, the Faculty of Bioethics offers a complete college cycle with its three degrees: bachelor, licentiate, doctorate. The purpose of the Faculty is to train professionals to be capable of competently engaging in the ethical issues that continually arise in the field of biological and biomedical sciences, with respect for human dignity and the protection of life of every individual, from conception to natural death.

The Faculty also offers a Master in Bioethics, as well as highly specialised international courses in the summer.

== Programmes ==
The Athenaeum runs a number of programmes.

Among the programmes, a course on exorcism served for the basis of a book on the same topic by Reverend Gary Thomas.

== Institutes ==
=== Institute Fides et Ratio ===
The Institute Fides et Ratio (Institute for Faith and Science), which is based on the guidelines proposed by the encyclical Fides et Ratio of John Paul II, is committed to the research and teaching of the themes concerning the relationship between science and faith, to provide answers to new and urgent ethical and anthropological questions that the continuous development of science and technology has raised, trying to propose, through its teaching and research, meeting points for dialogue and common search for truth.

The Institute organises research seminars, training courses, conferences, symposia and meetings on the relationship between science and faith.

=== Institute for Advanced Studies on Women ===
The Institute for Advanced Studies on Women, founded in 2003, is the first Italian centre for systematic studies on women; it seeks to promote a Christian understanding of women in an educational, intellectual, human and social order with the aim of increasing the presence and influence of women in society.

=== Sacerdos Institute ===
The mission of the Sacerdos Institute is to promote a spirituality of communion among the clergy. It is mainly orientated towards supporting priests through the exchange of practical experiences and proposals for pastoral moments of fraternity and communion.

=== Institute of Bioethics and Human Rights ===
A chair was created, in 2009, in partnership with the UNESCO, to encourage a broad exchange of ideas and sharing of different experiences through dialogue between the institutions of higher education in different countries, especially developing countries. The UNESCO Chair provides a space for reflection, study and information on the principles of bioethics in science, medicine and new technologies, in light of the United Nations Universal Declaration on Human Rights. Through holistic education, research and information, the chair seeks to contribute to the recognition and promotion of a comprehensive and integral vision of bioethics, bringing to light universal values and principles and their legal implications in relation to human rights.

=== Fidelis Institute of Economic Ethics ===
The Fidelis Institute of Economic Ethics is a centre of research in applied ethics that aspires to promote an integrated vision of economic action that respects both the dignity of the person and the common good. It is part of an international network of research centres, the Fidelis International Institute for Business Ethics.

== Journals ==
The Athenaeum operates 3 academic journals:

- Studia Bioethica is published as a quarterly. It contains articles on the topics of bioethics and biomedicine biogiuridica, analyzed in their ethical implications.
- Ecclesia, founded in 1987, is a Catholic culture quarterly magazine, published in Spanish, with an occasional article in Italian.
- Alpha Omega is a quarterly journal published by the faculty of philosophy and theology. It is published in 5 languages: English, French, Italian, German and Spanish.

== Activities ==
On 19 May 2008, the university hosted a conference, organised by the Embassy of the United States to the Holy See, to assess the value of the United Nations Universal Declaration of Human Rights.

On 27 October 2008, the university dedicated a new Library to Pope Pius XII.
