= Legionaries of Christ =

Roman Catholic religious congregation

Congregation of the Legionaries of Christ
- Latin: Congregatio Legionariorum Christi
- Coat of arms
- Abbreviation: LC
- Founded: January 3, 1941 (85 years ago)
- Founder: Marcial Maciel, LC
- Founded at: Mexico City, Mexico
- Type: Clerical religious congregation of pontifical right
- Headquarters: Rome, Italy
- Members: 1,700 members (1000 priests) (2023)
- Director General: Carlos Alberto Gutiérrez López, LC
- Parent organization: Catholic Church
- Website: https://www.legionariesofchrist.org/

The Congregation of the Legionaries of Christ (Latin: Congregatio Legionariorum Christi; abbreviated L.C.), formerly the Apostolic Missionary Mission of the Sacred Heart of Jesus, is a Catholic religious congregation of pontifical right founded in 1941 by the Mexican Catholic priest Marcial Maciel. It belongs constitutively to the spiritual family of Regnum Christi together with the Consecrated Women of Regnum Christi and the Lay Consecrated Men of Regnum Christi.

Maciel led the congregation until 2005, when controversies began to emerge over cult-like tendencies within the larger Regnum Christi federation. In 2006, Maciel was investigated by the Holy See and suspended from his ministry, initially over breaches of celibacy, and following public revelations later confirmed as sustained, over sexual abuse of minors. After Maciel's death, and following more revelations, Pope Benedict XVI ordered an apostolic visitation of the Legionaries 2009.

The investigation and reform of the Legionaries of Christ led to a reevaluation of the statutes of Regnum Christi that were written in 2004, and a deep reflection on the nature of Regnum Christi as a whole. Members from all states in life participated in that reflection, as individuals and in groups, under the guidance of officials from the Holy See. The new statutes of the Regnum Christi Federation were approved by the Holy See on May 31, 2019.

== History ==
=== Foundation ===
On January 3, 1941, the Apostolic Missionary Mission of the Sacred Heart of Jesus was founded in Mexico City as a separate section of the Diocesan Seminary of Cuernavaca. This initiative was promoted by seminarian Marcial Maciel, marking the beginning of what would later become the Legionaries of Christ. The creation of this new entity had the approval of Bishop Francisco González Arias, Bishop of Cuernavaca, and Archbishop Luis María Martínez, Archbishop of Mexico City. The "missionary work", as it was called at the beginning, was composed of a group of seminarians with the purpose of forming a new religious congregation. This objective was recorded in the diary of the founding community, where the seminarians referred to themselves as "future congregated".

On March 25, 1946, a significant step was taken with the establishment of the first novitiate house, in what is called a "foundation in fact", since the congregation did not yet have formal recognition by the Catholic Church in Rome.

=== Founder ===
Marcial Maciel was born in Cotija, Michoacán on March 10, 1920, into a devout Catholic family—four of his uncles were bishops—during a time in which the Mexican government was fiercely anticlerical. He became a priest after a troubled youth. Maciel was expelled from two seminaries for reasons that have never been explained, and became a priest only after one of his bishop uncles ordained him after private studies.

Maciel was ordained a priest on November 26, 1944, in Mexico City, but had already founded the congregation in 1941, with the support of Francisco González Arias, Bishop of Cuernavaca. Two years later in 1946, he presented a donation to the Vatican for $10,000, "a huge sum in a city reeling from the war."

Pope John Paul II praised him in lavish ceremonies and called him an "efficacious guide to youth". In general, the Holy See held Maciel "up as a model of sainthood for the faithful" in large part "because he brought in money and vocations to the priesthood."

In the Legionaries of Christ, Maciel was called "nuestro padre". Members of the congregation were taught "the Legion message"—that Maciel "had his enemies, but that he was a living saint for his leadership as an evangelist, drawing the church back from liberal abuses of the Second Vatican Council and attracting young men to a strict religious life."

==== Maciel abuses ====
One of the first English language public reports of abuse came in 1997 exposing abuse that happened in the 1950s. Juan Vaca and seven other early victims of Maciel "gave graphic accounts" in the Hartford Courant of how they watched Maciel inject himself with a morphine painkiller in Spain and Rome in the 1950s and finally had to be hospitalized. Cardinal Valerio Valeri received reports "from an older seminarian in Mexico City" and the head of the one Legionaries high school at the time (Cumbres Institute), who were concerned about Maciel's drug use and "overly affectionate behavior with boys". Valeri suspended Maciel but in 1959 he was reinstated by Clemente Micara, the interim vicar of Rome.

In 1998, nine men lodged formal charges at the Vatican that Maciel had abused them as youths and young men while studying under him; Maciel was initially investigated by the Holy See and suspended from his ministry in 2006. In 2009, an apostolic visitation was ordered by Pope Benedict XVI and shortly after Cardinal Velasio De Paolis was delegated to impose "structural changes".

For a long time, the Vatican dismissed accusations by seminarians that Maciel had abused them sexually, some when they were as young as 12. After years of denial by the Congregation and the Regnum Christi movement and dismissal of accusations made by many former members, an investigation prompted by the Vatican concluded that allegations of sexual abuse of minors by Maciel were true. On 1 May 2010, the Holy See issued a communique on its year-long investigation of the Legionaries, condemning "system of power" created by Marcial Maciel, that hid "true crimes" and a private life "without scruples or authentic religious sentiment." The communique called for the Legionaries to follow a "path of purification", including a "sincere encounter" with Maciel's abuse victims.

The superiors of the congregation did not officially inform the rest of the congregation until a year after his death, during which time, they continued to permit an internal culture of revering him as a saint. The Legionaries of Christ eventually acknowledged their founder's "reprehensible and objectively immoral behavior" as head of the congregation. As a result of the scandal, Pope Benedict XVI also removed the vow of charity, which required members to maintain secrecy, impermeability, and refrain from criticism of superiors. The "very serious and objectively immoral acts" of Maciel, which were "confirmed by incontrovertible testimonies", represented "true crimes and manifest a life without scruples or authentic religious sentiment", the Vatican said.

After the scandals of Maciel came to light, some priests and seminarians left the congregation. Several schools and centers of formation closed. According to the BBC, the 2019 report by the order found that Marcial Maciel had abused at least 60 children, and that another 33 priests of the order abused minors, bringing the total number of children abused by the order since its founding in 1941 to at least 175.

After Maciel's abuses came to light, Pope Benedict XVI sentenced him to a life of "prayer and penance" in 2006. Maciel died in Jacksonville, Florida, on January 30, 2008, aged 87, and was buried in his hometown of Cotija de la Paz, Michoacán, Mexico. Immediately following Maciel's death, the Legion's leaders proclaimed "his ascent to heaven". In 2010, the Vatican declared in an official communiqué that "the very grave and objectively immoral actions of Father Maciel, confirmed by incontrovertible testimonies, in some cases constitute real crimes and manifest a life devoid of scruples and authentic religious meaning."

=== Further abuses ===
In 2019, the organization admitted that Father Fernando Martínez Suarez had abused eight minors between 1990 and 1993. A month later, they admitted that members of the organization had sexually abused 175 children between 1941 and 2019. Sixty of those were abused by its founder, some of whom were his own children from several relations. Six of the priests had died, eight had left the priesthood, one left the Congregation, and 18 continued in their posts but had been removed from tasks where they interacted with the public or with children. +

The 2019 report by the Legionaries noted that 14 of the 33 priests who abused minors had been victims themselves when they were young, thus highlighting what it called "chains of abuse", where "a victim of a Legionnaire, over time, becomes in turn an aggressor". The Legionaries of Christ also singled out former Vatican Secretariat of State Angelo Sodano for leading efforts to cover up the reports of abuse. According to the report, an internal commission "verified the various accusations of sexual abuse of minors throughout the history of the Congregation of the Legionaries of Christ. It collected the global statistics of cases of abuse by its priests between 1941 and 2019 and included an appendix with the steps taken to prevent future abuse and guarantee safe environments."

=== Renewal ===
Following the revelations of abuse, the Legionaries underwent a visitation by the Vatican and a process of renewal through a series of discussions revolving around the charism of the movement, the relationship of the congregation to the lay movement, and the place of both within the Church.

In 2006, Maciel was investigated by the Holy See and suspended from his ministry, initially over breaches of celibacy. This followed public revelations that he had sexually abused minors, which were later confirmed. The Legion's additional vow of "charity" had been used to induce secrecy, promising not to criticize superiors. This was lifted by Pope Benedict XVI in December 2007.

==== Apostolic visitation ====
In early 2009, the Vatican ordered an apostolic visitation of the institutions of the Legionaries of Christ following disclosures of sexual impropriety by Maciel. Vatican authorities named five bishops from five different countries, each one in charge of investigating the Legionaries in a particular part of the world:

- Ricardo Watty Urquidi, Bishop of Tepic, Mexico, in charge of Mexico and Central America, where the Legionaries have 44 houses, 250 priests and 115–120 religious seminarians;
- Charles J. Chaput, Archbishop of Denver, in charge of the United States and Canada, where the Legionaries have 24 houses, 130 priests and 260 religious seminarians;
- Giuseppe Versaldi, Bishop of Alessandria, in charge of Italy, Israel, the Philippines, and South Korea, where the Legionaries have 16 houses, 200 priests and 420 religious seminarians (in Italy 13, 168 and 418 respectively);
- Ricardo Ezzati Andrello, Archbishop of Concepción, Chile, in charge of Chile, Argentina, Colombia, Brazil and Venezuela, where the Legionaries have 20 houses, 122 priests and 122 religious seminarians;
- Ricardo Blázquez Pérez, Bishop of Bilbao, Spain, in charge of Spain, France, Germany, Switzerland, Ireland, Holland, Poland, Austria and Hungary, where the Legionaries have 20 houses, 105 priests, and 160 religious seminarians.

They met with the pope to report on the visitation in April 2010, and the Vatican issued a statement on 1 May 2010.

==== Revision of statutes, 2019 report and aftermath ====
Cardinal Velasio De Paolis was delegated to examine the Legionaries' constitutions and conduct a visitation of its lay affiliate Regnum Christi in 2012. On October 19, 2012, De Paolis published a cover letter for a summary of the Regnum Christi's charism which he had approved as a working document.

Under the guidance of Cardinal Velasio De Paolis, the congregation announced the congregation's Extraordinary General Chapter in Rome in January 2014, for a "total restructuring". Apologies to the victims were issued and a compensation commission established. In 2019, new statutes were adopted introducing collegial leadership and more transparent community life to prevent possible abuses in the future.

The Legionaries completed a five-year renewal process that included a revision of its constitutions, which were approved during an extraordinary general chapter. The entire congregation revised the Constitutional document under the direction of a central committee and presented a final version to the new Pope Francis. On 4 November 2014, after an extensive process of the reform of the Legionaries of Christ, the Vatican approved the congregation's amended constitutions. The five-year renewal process was completed with the approval of amended constitutions.

In a December 2019 report, the organization accepted responsibility for 175 cases of child sexual abuse by 33 priests, including 60 minors who were abused by Marcial Maciel. However, Archbishop Rogelio Cabrera López, head of the Episcopal Conference of Mexico, said on December 22, 2019, that the report is "late and incomplete": "How is it possible that the founder committed crimes for 70 years and no one ever said anything?"

When the 2019 report was released, Fr John Connor (then North American territorial director of the LC and later the general director of the Congregation worldwide) released a communication compiling a list of all of the previously released names of Legionaries of Christ who were active in ministry with substantiated sexual abuse allegations in the United States.

One month later, Connor again addressed the North American territory in a letter saying, "We must pray that these victims receive the healing they need and that those who are still trying to find the courage to come forward are able to find it. This is an important part of the healing process for victims and it’s important for the Congregation to listen to the experiences of victims so that we can make reparation and be further purified."

In his letter, Connor also affirmed that the organization is "committed to transparency about the abuse that has been perpetrated by Legionaries of Christ, to working towards a culture in which all our priests deeply understand the effects of sexual abuse and their role as spiritual fathers dedicated to nourishing God’s people, and to helping those who have been harmed to heal from their wounds."

10 years after the Holy See took over the Legion, in an address directed to Legionaries during their General Chapter of 2020 and to the General Assemblies of Regnum Christi held during the same period, Pope Francis recognized the progress made in their renewal saying: "The new Constitutions and the new Statutes are truly 'new,' be it because they reflect a new spirit and a new vision of religious life, consistent with Vatican Council II and the directions of the Holy See, be it because they are the product of a three-year endeavor, in which all your communities were involved and which has led to a change in mentality."

However, a report emerged around January 2020 alleging that the papal envoy in charge (the by then deceased Cardinal Velasio De Paolis) "refused to punish or even investigate" a case where a Legionaries priest, who had direct links to the founder, raped "little girls aged 6 to 8 or 9" in front of their classmates at an elite Catholic school in Cancún, Mexico, and noted a "high-level cover-up by superiors who are still in power". According to a former Legionaries priest, Rev. Christian Borgogno, "De Paolis' decision to leave in place Legionaries superiors, many of whom were close to Maciel, 'made reform' of the Legion 'impossible'". In response, a month later the Legionaries promised "accountability and transparency" and "vowed to investigate the confirmed cases of past abuse by 33 priests and 71 seminarians".

== Affiliated groups ==
The Congregation of the Legionaries of Christ forms part of the Regnum Christi Federation, founded by Maciel in 1959, which includes the Legionaries of Christ, the Society of Apostolic Life of the Consecrated Women of Regnum Christi, the Society of Apostolic Life of the Lay Consecrated Men of Regnum Christi, and other Catholics who associate individually. Its members add the nominal letters (LC) after their names to indicate their membership in the Congregation. The "larger culture" is often referred to as "the movement" within the Regnum Christi Federation.

== Ethos ==
Members of the Legionaries take vows of humility, poverty, chastity, and obedience. The vow of humility, which is not one of the three vows taken by all major Catholic religious institutes, obligates Legionaries not to seek positions of power within the Legionaries or the Church as a whole. In addition, until 2007, all Legionaries were compelled to take "private vows", never to "speak ill of Maciel or any superiors, and to report to their superiors anyone who did", a policy that impeded the discovery of wrongdoing by Maciel and other Legionary leaders, according to investigative journalist Jason Berry. This vow was lifted by the pope, and has not been taken by new Legionaries.

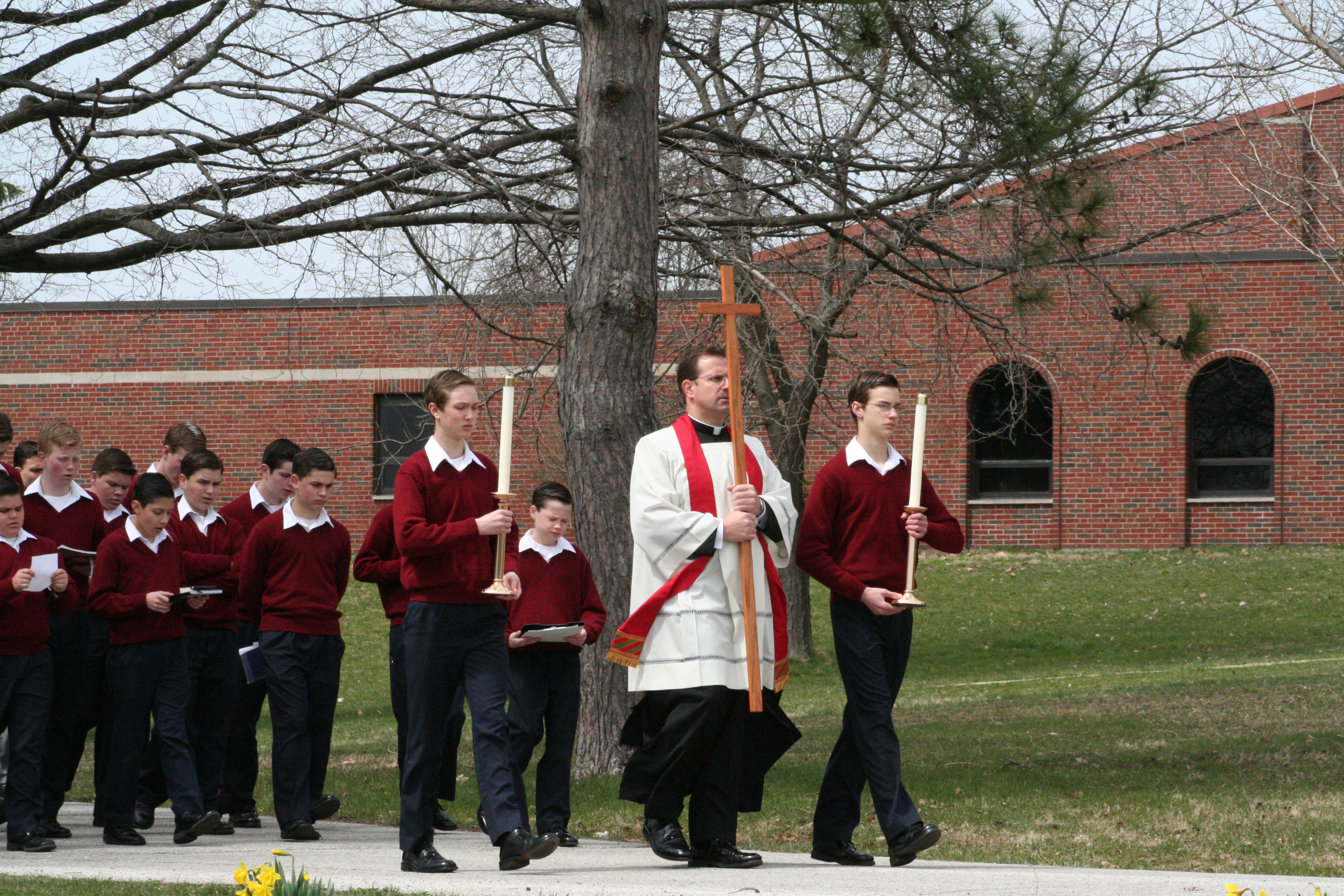
The students at Sacred Heart Apostolic School in Rolling Prairie, Indiana, praying the Stations of the Cross on Good Friday, 2009

Love for Christ is, for Legionaries, a personal experience. Through the Gospel, the cross, and the Eucharist, Legionary spirituality teaches that the Legionary should seek to know Christ intimately, and love him in a passionate way by embracing him as their model of holiness. Their spirituality is Christ-centered with a particular emphasis on the Sacred Heart, which is the patron of the Legion, in their vocation as religious and priests.

Love for Mary is seen as arising from the imitation of Christ. In the Legion, Our Lady is venerated as both Mother of the Church and of the individual Legionary's vocation. Legionaries consecrate their spiritual and apostolic lives to her care, and seek to take on her virtues of faith, hope, charity, obedience to God, humility, and cooperation with Christ's plan of redemption and justice.

Love for Souls is defined in the Legionaries as an ardent desire to spread Christ's kingdom in this world. Legionaries focus on helping the greatest number of souls know and love Christ. In Legionary theology, time is a gift given by God which he wants to maximize to spread the Gospel and help bring the love of God to many souls.

== Formation ==
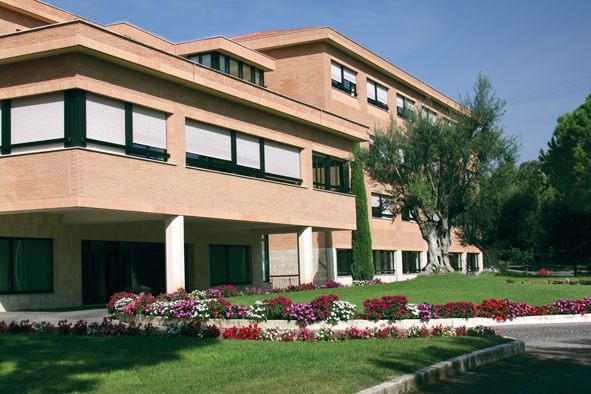
Outside the Pontifical Athenaeum Regina Apostolorum in Rome, Italy, where Legionaries study Philosophy and Theology

According to the National Catholic Reporter, the Legionaries of Christ was founded so early in the career of Marcial Maciel, he was ordained as a priest after he was leading the order.

The Legionaries have been described as "conservative" and focusing on "ministering to the wealthy and powerful in the belief that by evangelizing society's leaders, the beneficial impact on society is multiplied". Today the Legion purports its priests "are the confessors and chaplains to some of the most powerful businessmen in Latin America".

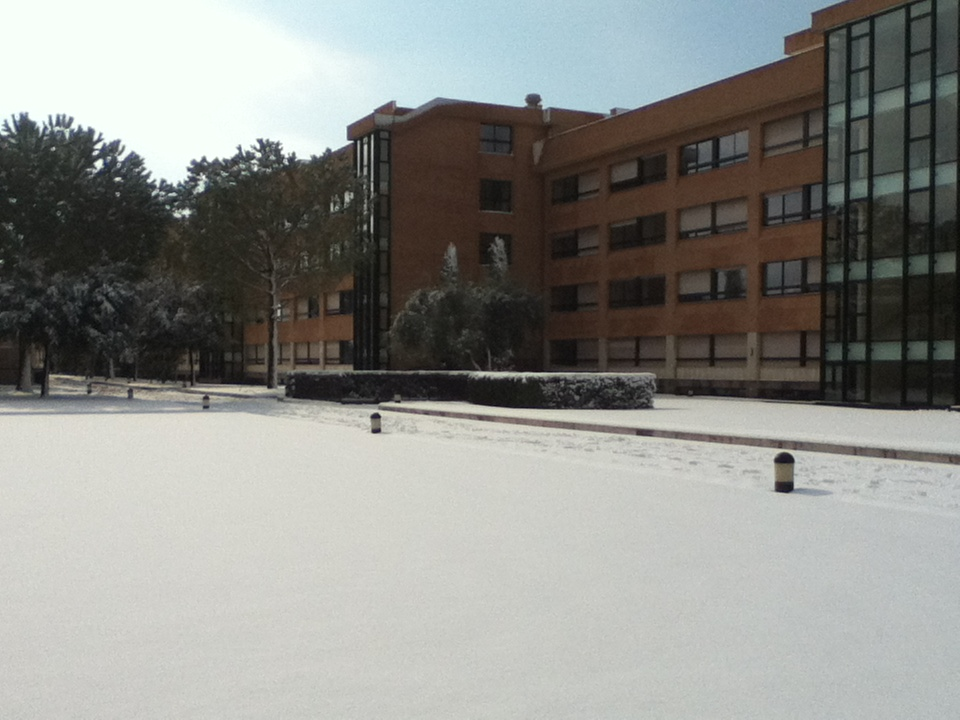
The Legion's Center for Higher Studies in Rome, Italy

Legionaries have been described as "easy to spot in Rome, young men with close-cropped hair in traditional cassocks or double-breasted blazers, walking two by two like a spiritual army." Legionaries culture has been described as "insular" and "cultlike".

The Legionaries began in Mexico where its largest base remains. It is said to have created "a vast network" of private schools and universities for the children of the elite in that country, which provided funding for his movement’s worldwide expansion. Houses of formation were established in Spain and Italy within its first decade. In the 1960s, chapters of the organization were founded in Ireland and then in the United States. In the 1970s and 80s the congregation expanded throughout Latin America. In the 90s it expanded to France and Central Europe.

The Legionaries presents itself as dedicated to advancing the Church's mission in the world, and to this end claims to submit candidates to a rigorous formation of four dimensions: human, spiritual, intellectual, and apostolic. Critics accused the Legionaries of producing priests and religious who all spoke and behaved in the same way. The Legion's defenders argued that, just as members of a family receive similar upbringing, so the members of the Legionaries were formed in like ways, but still respected the freedom of the individual. The new constitutions approved by Pope Francis present a more balanced approach to the formation of members.

As is the practice in many religious congregations of the Roman Catholic Church, Legionaries may visit their family according to their superiors' discretion and the norms of the Congregation, the average being for about 4–7 days a year not counting special occasions. Regular contact with their families is encouraged with respect to written, verbal, and video communication.

== Apostolates ==
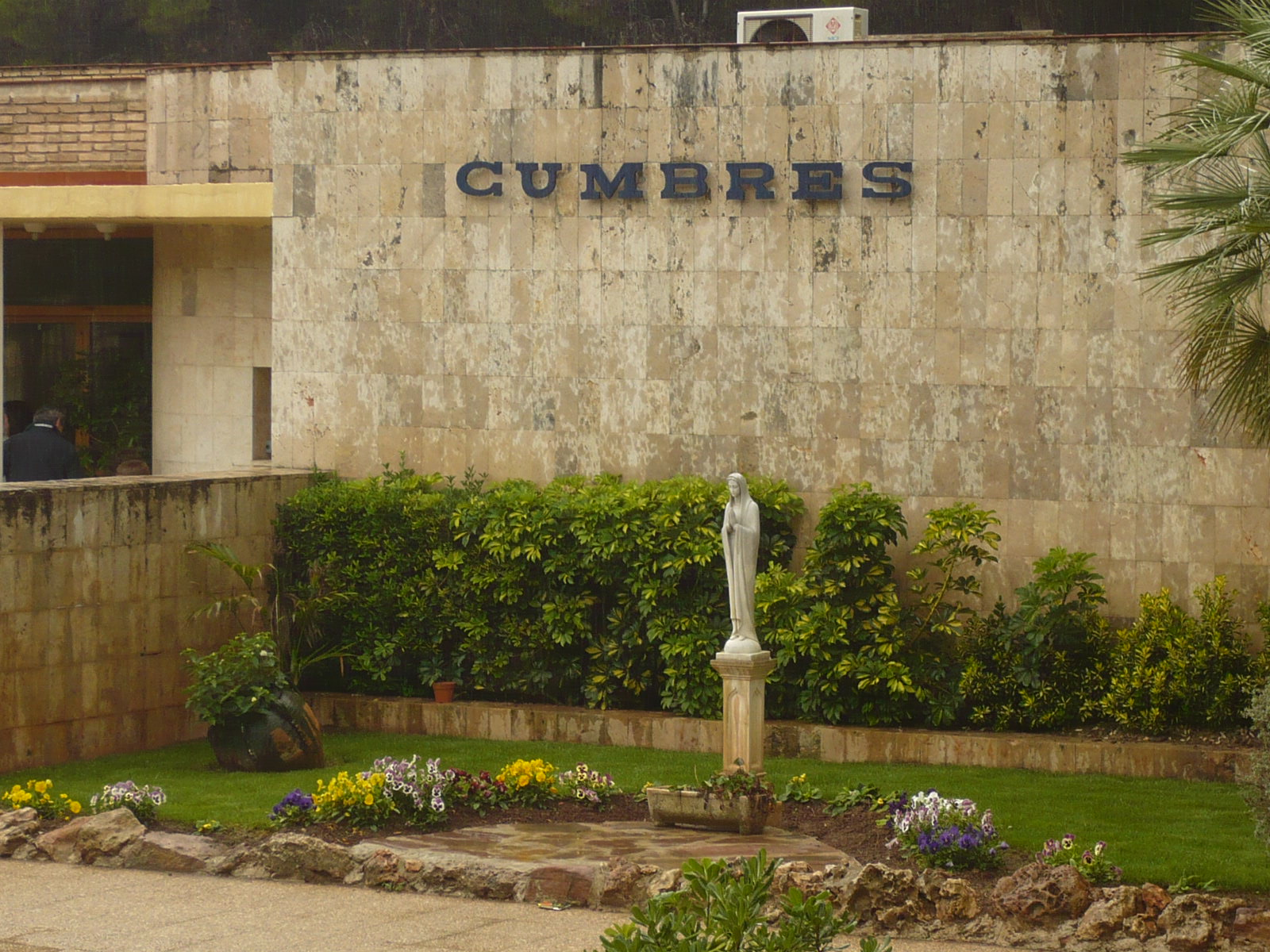
The front of a Legionary School in Valencia, Spain

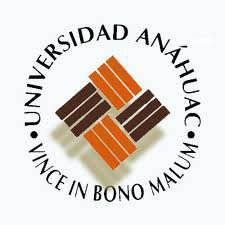
Logo of the Universidad Anáhuac México Norte

The apostolate of the Legionaries (i.e. organizations "directed to serving and evangelizing the world") has many aspects, but focuses on the following:

- Education and teaching at all levels.
- Pastoral attention to youth and families.
- Catechesis and preaching of retreats and spiritual exercises.
- Evangelization and mission work (especially in the Mexican State of Quintana Roo in the Yucatán Peninsula).
- Attention to the underprivileged, especially those groups that undergo the greatest spiritual, moral or material privation.
- Works of Christian charity and mercy.
- Supporting bishops in the formation of diocesan seminarians and in the ongoing formation of their priests.
- Spiritual attention to Regnum Christi members and accompanying them in their formation.

In the US, the congregation runs four schools. In 2012, all three of its high schools (Everest Collegiate High School and Academy, The Highlands School and Pinecrest Academy) were named in the list of top 50 Catholic High Schools developed by the Cardinal Newman Society.

In Mexico, the Legionaries administer the Anahuac University Network. Legionaries operate centers of education (minor seminaries, seminaries, schools and/or universities) in Mexico, Venezuela, Colombia, Brazil, Korea, Ireland, Spain, Italy, France, Germany, the United States, and Canada.

In 2006, the Legion launched a test phase of Mission Network in the United States. Catholic Mission Network, Inc., is the umbrella organization that oversees and approves Legionary-endorsed apostolates that are not stand-alone like a school or retreat center. Its purpose is to provide both structure and supervision of the apostolates, and an overview as to what the Legion/Regnum Christi does as a whole, with brand-name-type recognition.

The youth wing of Regnum Christi, offering spirituality for youth 11 to 16, is called ECYD. The commitments in ECYD vary over time, adapting to the ages of the members. Many ECYD members are involved in clubs run or overseen by Legionaries or consecrated members of Regnum Christi.

== Notable members ==
- Deomar De Guedes Vaz (born 1961), second general councilor
- Anthony Freeman (1988–2018), religious brother
- Fernando Vérgez Alzaga (born 1945), president of the Pontifical Commission for Vatican City State and President of the Governorate of Vatican City State, since 2021 (cardinal in 2022)
- Father Paul Habsburg (born 1968), Archduke of Austria, and member of the House of Habsburg-Lorraine

== See also ==
- Controversies surrounding the Legion of Christ
- ECYD
- Regnum Christi
- Regnum Christi Consecrated Men
- Regnum Christi Consecrated Women

== Further viewing ==
Films

- Erffa, Zita: "The Best Thing You Can Do with Your Life", Documentary, 93 min, Germany/ Mexiko 2018, Director: Zita Erffa, DOP: Bruno Santamaría, Production: Petruvski Films in Coproduction with Ojo de Vaca und HFF München, supported by the CCC Mexiko. Premiere: Berlinale 2018. In Mexican cinemas from: 9.th of November 2019: Cineteca Nacional.
