= Joseph Hubert Hart =

American Roman Catholic prelate (1931–2023)

His Excellency, The Most Reverend Joseph Hubert Hart
- Bishop of Cheyenne
- Church: Roman Catholic Church
- See: Diocese of Cheyenne
- Appointed: April 25, 1978
- Installed: June 12, 1978
- Retired: September 26, 2001
- Predecessor: Hubert Newell
- Successor: David Laurin Ricken
- Previous posts: Auxiliary Bishop of Cheyenne and Titular Bishop of Thimida Regia (1976–1978)

Orders
- Ordination: May 1, 1956 by John Cody
- Consecration: August 31, 1976 by Hubert Newell, Charles Herman Helmsing, and Michael Francis McAuliffe

Personal details
- Born: September 26, 1931 Kansas City, Missouri, U.S.
- Died: August 23, 2023 (aged 91)
- Motto: Dominus pars (The lord is a part (of me))
- Coat of arms

Styles of Joseph Hubert Hart
- Reference style: His Excellency; The Most Reverend
- Spoken style: Your Excellency
- Religious style: Bishop

Joseph Hubert Hart (September 26, 1931 – August 23, 2023) was an American prelate of the Roman Catholic Church. He served as bishop of the Diocese of Cheyenne in Wyoming from 1978 to 2001 and as auxiliary bishop of the same diocese from 1976 to 1978. Hart faced accusations of sexual abuse in the Diocese of Cheyenne, but he was ultimately exonerated.

== Biography ==
=== Early life ===
Joseph Hart was born on September 26, 1931, to Hubert and Kathryn (née Muser) Hart in Kansas City, Missouri. His brother James became a priest of the Diocese of Kansas City-St. Joseph, and his sister Rosemary served as human resources director for the U.S. Environmental Protection Agency.

Hart attended St. Peter's Grade School (1936–1944) and Bishop Hogan High School (1944–1948), both in Kansas City, Missouri. He then studied at Rockhurst College in Kansas City, Missouri, and St. Meinrad Seminary in Saint Meinrad, Indiana.

=== Priesthood ===
Hart was ordained a priest by Bishop John Cody for the Diocese of Kansas City-Saint Joseph on May 1, 1956. After his ordination, Hart served as assistant pastor at Guardian Angels Parish (1956–1962) and Visitation Parish (1962–1966), both in Kansas City, Missouri.

Hart worked as vice-chancellor of the diocese from 1964 to 1969, during which time he also assisted at St. Therese Parish (1966–1968) and St. James Parish (1968–1969), both in Kansas City. From 1969 to 1976, Hart served as pastor of St. John Francis Regis Parish in Kansas City. At the same time, he also taught at Bishop Lillis High School, Loretto Academy, and St. Pius X High School, all in Kansas City.

=== Auxiliary Bishop and Bishop of Cheyenne ===
On July 1, 1976, Pope Paul VI appointed Hart as an auxiliary bishop of the Diocese of Cheyenne and titular bishop of Thimida Regia. He was consecrated in Cheyenne, Wyoming, on August 31, 1976, by Bishop Hubert Newell, with Bishops Charles Helmsing and Michael McAuliffe serving as co-consecrators. As an auxiliary bishop, Hart served as vicar general and pastor of St. Patrick Parish in Casper, Wyoming.

On April 25, 1978, Paul VI named Hart as the sixth bishop of Cheyenne. He was installed at the Cathedral of St. Mary in Cheyenne on June 12, 1978. Hart selected as his episcopal motto: "Dominus Pars."

During his tenure as bishop, Hart established the annual Bishop's Appeal and ordained 25 priests for the diocese. He was an active member of the United States Conference of Catholic Bishops (USCCB) and served as chairman of the bishops of Conference Region XIII for six years.

In 1989 and 1992, the Diocese of Kansas City-St. Joseph received accusations that Hart had sexually abused young boys in the early 1970s, when he was serving as a priest in that diocese. Hart volunteered to go to an Arizona residential facility for a psychiatric evaluation, which later concluded that Hart "does not appear to be a threat to himself or others on any level." The diocese reported the allegations to the papal nuncio and the USCCB, but did not reveal them publicly until January 2002. Hart "categorically and completely" denied the allegations, which he described as "baseless" and sources of "great pain...[and] embarrassment."

=== Retirement and legacy ===
On September 26, 2001, Hart submitted his letter of resignation as Bishop of the Diocese of Cheyenne to Pope John Paul II.

In 2002, Hart was accused of repeatedly coercing a 14-year-old boy to expose himself in 1977, when Hart was auxiliary bishop in Cheyenne. Hart was cleared of those charges in July 2002. However, it was later determined that the original investigation was flawed; it was re-opened and more accusers came forward. Hart's successor, Bishop David Ricken, was also implicated for his role in defending, and possibly also protecting, Hart during this criminal investigation.

In 2004, Hart was named in a civil lawsuit alleging that he sexually abused three children while serving in Kansas City and Cheyenne. In 2005, a fifth person alleged abuse by Hart in 1973 or 1974, when the man was a 12-year-old parishioner at St. John Francis Regis Parish. In 2008, the Diocese of Kansas City-St. Joseph approved a $10 million settlement to a group of 47 victims who cited Hart among 12 other clergymen responsible for their abuse.

In 2017, Bishop Steven Biegler, bishop of Cheyenne, announced an investigation of Hart. In April 2018, the Cheyenne Police Department started a criminal investigation into Hart. In August 2019, the police recommended that criminal charges be filed against Hart. Four more people from Wyoming and Missouri also accused Hart of sexually abusing them as well, bringing the total of sex abuse allegations against Hart to more than a dozen. It was also revealed that in June 2019 Pope Francis started a canonical penal process against Hart.

The diocese investigation concluded in July 2018, declaring that two victims were credible and their stories substantiated. However, in June 2020, the Natrona County District Attorney's Office declined to press charges against Hart. Believing that the case was prosecutable, the Cheyenne police submitted it to the Wyoming Attorney General. In January 2021, the Congregation for the Doctrine of the Faith in the Vatican cleared Hart of seven sexual abuse charges and stated that five other charges could not be proven. However, the Congregation rebuked Hart "...for his flagrant lack of prudence as a priest and bishop for being alone with minors." Also in January 2021, Wyoming Attorney General Bridget Hill announced that her office would not pursue criminal charges against Hart.

Joseph Hubert Hart died on August 23, 2023, at the age of 91.

== See also ==
- Catholic Church hierarchy
- Catholic Church in the United States
- Historical list of the Catholic bishops of the United States
- List of Catholic bishops of the United States
- Lists of patriarchs, archbishops, and bishops

Catholic Church titles
Preceded by Hubert Newell	Bishop of Cheyenne; 1978–2001	Succeeded by David Laurin Ricken
Preceded by —	Auxiliary Bishop of Cheyenne; 1976–1978	Succeeded by —
Preceded by Lucien-Emile Bardonne	Titular Bishop of Thimida Regia; 1976–1978	Succeeded by Jan Walenty Wieczorek
