= St. Mary's Medical Center (Grand Junction, Colorado) =

- Intermountain Health
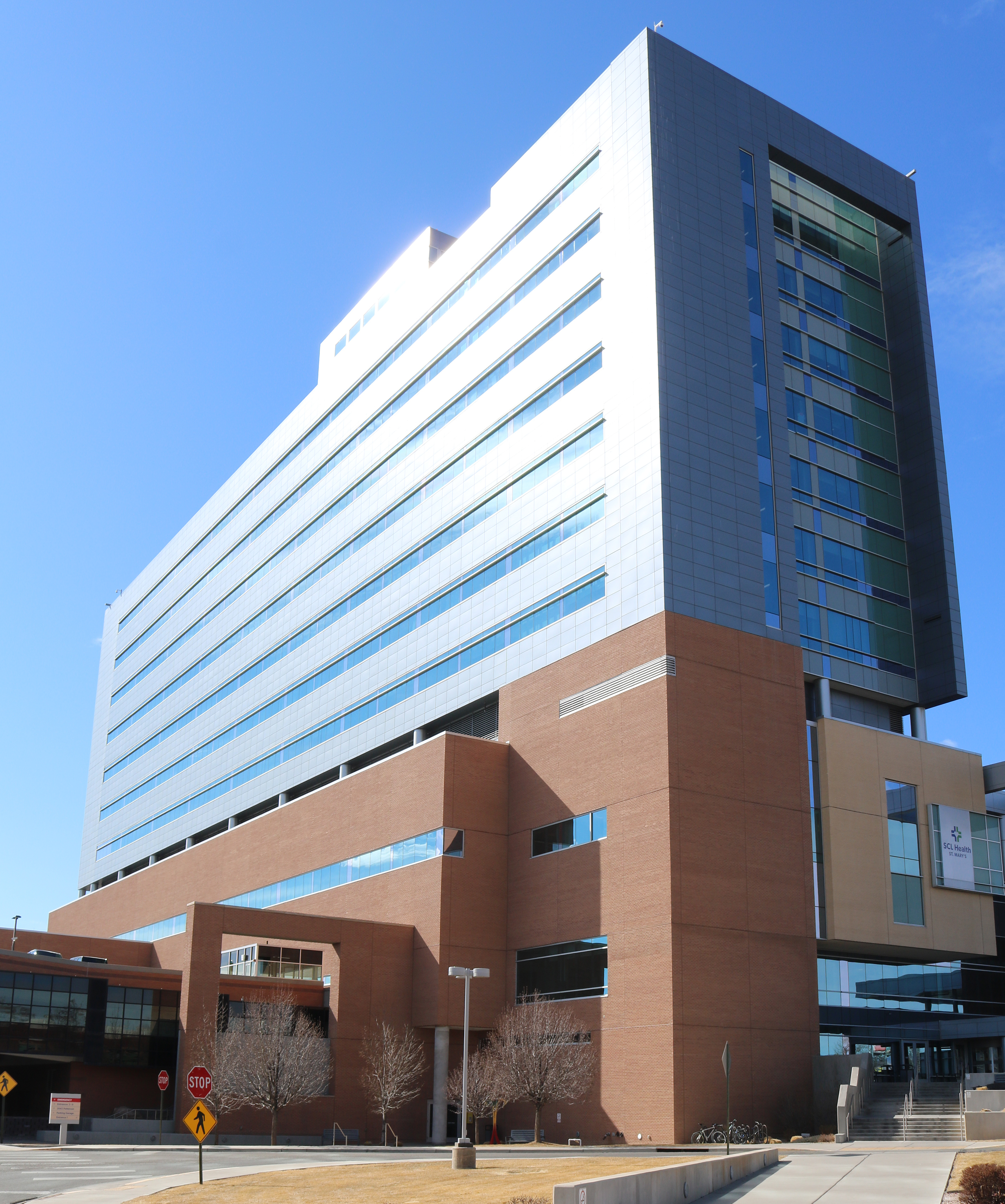
- The hospital's main building

- The hospital's location in Colorado.

Geography
- Location: 2635 North 7th Street; Grand Junction, Colorado 81501, Mesa County, Colorado, United States
- Coordinates: 39°05′24″N 108°33′46″W

Organization
- Type: General
- Patron: Saint Mary
- Network: Intermountain Health

Services
- Emergency department: Level II trauma center
- Beds: 310

Helipads
- Helipad: Yes

History
- Founded: 1896

Links
- Website: www.sclhealth.org/locations/st-marys-medical-center/
- Lists: Hospitals in Colorado

St. Mary's Medical Center is a regional hospital in Grand Junction, Colorado, in Mesa County. The hospital has 310 beds, making it the largest hospital between Denver and Salt Lake City. The hospital has a Level II trauma center.

== History ==
=== Origin ===
The Sisters of Charity of Leavenworth was formed out of the Sisters of Charity of Nazareth in Bardstown, Kentucky. Its foundation is accredited to Mother Xavier Ross, who traveled to Leavenworth at the invitation of Bishop Jean Baptiste Miege in 1858. The Sisters follow their traditions to Louise de Marillac, Saint Vincent de Paul, and the Daughters of Charity.

Shortly after her arrival, an orphanage for African-American children, an academy for girls, and a program for the visitation of prisoners at the nearby Fort Leavenworth was set up. The sisters became known for the foundation of hospitals across the area, most notably that of Saint Joseph Hospital in Denver, CO, which was founded by the sisters in 1873. The Sisters of Charity of Leavenworth set up 18 hospitals between Kansas and California between 1864 and 1952.

In 1895, Sisters Balbina Farrell and Louisa Madden of the Sisters of Charity of Leavenworth left Leavenworth, Kansas to establish a hospital in Grand Junction, Colorado. The hospital was officially opened on May 22, 1896. The original hospital was a wooden-framed structure capable of housing 10 beds. The construction of the hospital was funded through fundraisers, donations, and begging from the sisters.

=== Expansion ===
In 1912, the first brick structure was built to the original wooden-framed building. This new brick structure was capable of housing an additional 20 beds, putting the total up to 30 beds. Other minor additions were built between the 1920s and 1940s.

In 1985, a 125,000-square-foot facility was built on the hospital campus. The new facility housed a telemetry and intermediate care unit, a radiation oncology unit, a critical care unit, a perinatal center, and a pediatric unit capable of housing 20 beds.

In 1986, the hospital added a heart program that removed the need for patients in need of heart surgery to be transported to either Denver, CO or Salt Lake City, UT.

In 1994, a five-story tower was completed at the cost of $8 million. The tower added to the size of the hospital considerably, bringing it to seven-stories tall, and solidified its position as the largest medical center between Salt Lake City and Denver. The tower was renovated and fully reopened in 2010. St. Mary's Medical Center is the tallest building in the city of Grand Junction, standing at 146 ft (45 m) tall.

In April 2022, SCL Health, the healthcare organization that St. Mary's belonged to, merged with Intermountain Healthcare. The new organization took the name Intermountain Healthcare, but in early 2023, it changed its name to Intermountain Health.

== Facilities ==
=== Services and units ===
According to St. Mary's Medical Center, the hospital provides the following:

- Birthing Center
  - 24 room Level IIIB neonatal intensive care unit (NICU)
  - 12 labor rooms
- Cardiac and vascular services
- Emergency and trauma services
  - Level II Trauma Center
  - Helicopter transports via CareFLIGHT of the Rockies
- Imaging center
- Orthopedic and spine services
- Regional blood center
- Regional cancer center
- Surgical specialties

=== Emergency care ===
The hospital's emergency department has the only level II trauma center in the region. The emergency department has over 30 examination rooms and 3 trauma rooms.

The hospital has a helipad on its tower, and works in conjunction with CareFLIGHT of the Rockies to provide air transportation for critical patients in the region

== Residency Program in Family Medicine ==
The Family Medicine Residency program at St. Mary's was founded in 1979. It is a full spectrum program with a rural focus, and the only residency program at the hospital (entirely unopposed).
