= Hubert Newell =

American prelate of the Roman Catholic Church

His Excellency, The Most Reverend Hubert Michael Newell
- Bishop of Cheyenne
- See: Diocese of Cheyenne
- In office: September 24, 1947; January 3, 1978
- Predecessor: Patrick McGovern
- Successor: Joseph Hubert Hart

Orders
- Ordination: June 15, 1930 by John Tihen
- Consecration: September 24, 1947 by Urban John Vehr

Personal details
- Born: February 16, 1904 Denver, Colorado, USA
- Died: September 8, 1987 (aged 83)
- Denomination: Roman Catholic
- Education: Regis College; St. Thomas Aquinas Preparatory Seminary; Catholic University of America
- Motto: Auspice Maria (Under the protection of Mary)
- Coat of arms

Styles of Hubert Newell
- Reference style: The Most Reverend
- Spoken style: Your Excellency
- Religious style: Monsignor
- Posthumous style: none

Hubert Michael Newell (February 16, 1904 – September 8, 1987) was an American prelate of the Roman Catholic Church. He served as bishop of Cheyenne in Wyoming from 1951 to 1978.

== Biography ==
=== Early life ===
Hubert Newell was born on February 16, 1904, in Denver, Colorado, to Thomas and Ellen (née Taney) Newell. His parents were Irish immigrants from County Galway. A twin himself, he had a total of five siblings, including two sisters and three brothers. Thomas Newell worked as a policeman, then as a smelter worker.

Newell studied under the Sisters of Charity of Leavenworth before attending Sacred Heart High School and Regis College, both in Denver. After deciding to embark on an ecclesiastical career, he entered St. Thomas Aquinas Seminary in Denver for four years of study.

=== Priesthood ===
Newell was ordained to the priesthood in Denver for the Diocese of Denver by Bishop John Tihen on June 15, 1930. After his ordination, Newell served as assistant pastor at Our Lady of Sorrows Parish in Walsenburg, Colorado. In 1931, he was transferred to the Immaculate Conception Cathedral Parish in Denver. He was also appointed in 1933 as assistant principal of Cathedral High School in Denver, serving in that post until 1937.

Newell travelled to Washington, D.C. in 1937 to enter the Catholic University of America, obtaining a Master of Educational Administration degree in 1938. After returning to Denver, he was appointed as superintendent of the parochial schools for the diocese.

=== Coadjutor Bishop and Bishop of Cheyenne ===
On August 2, 1947, Newell was appointed as coadjutor bishop of Cheyenne and titular bishop of Zapara by Pope Pius XII. He received episcopal consecration on September 24, 1947, from Archbishop Urban Vehr, with Bishops Scannel and Philip Garrigan serving as co-consecrators in the Cathedral of the Immaculate Conception in Denver. Newell was the first native of Denver to be appointed a Catholic bishop. When Bishop Patrick McGovern died on November 8, 1951. Newell became the fifth bishop of Cheyenne.

As bishop, Newell established the diocesan newspaper, The Wyoming Catholic Register, in 1952, citing the need to communicate with parishioners. Also in 1952, he dedicated the new DePaul Hospital in Cheyenne. As part of a national initiative to involve women more in Catholic activities, Newell set up a Council of Catholic Women in Cheyenne. It was followed by other councils in Wyoming communities and by the Wyoming Council of Catholic Women in 1953. It was accredited by the National Council of Catholic Women that same year.

Newell was also a member of the National Catholic Welfare Conference, where he served on the committee for the Confraternity of Christian Doctrine. Newell suffered a minor heart attack in April 1961, but resumed his duties in August of that year. He attended the Second Vatican Council in Rome from 1962 to 1965.

=== Retirement and legacy ===
On January 3, 1978, Pope Paul VI accepted Newell's resignation as bishop of Cheyenne. Hubert Newell died on September 8, 1987, in Denver at age 83.

Catholic Church titles
Preceded by Patrick McGovern	Bishop of Cheyenne; 1951–1978	Succeeded by Joseph Hubert Hart
