= Diocese of Cheyenne =

Latin Catholic jurisdiction in the US

Coordinates: 41°08′44″N 104°48′07″W

Diocese of Cheyenne Dioecesis Cheyennensis
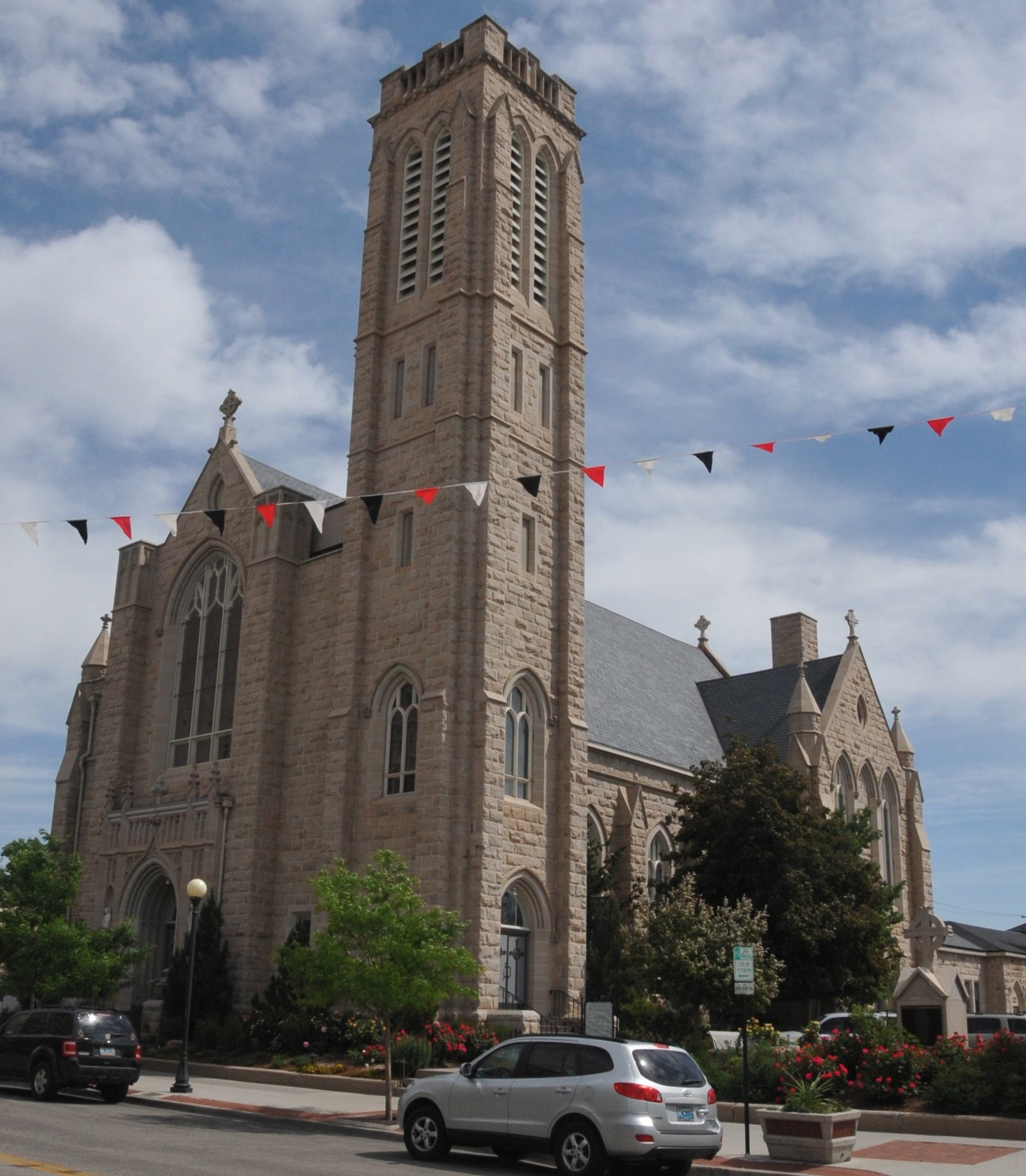
- St. Mary's Cathedral

- Coat of arms

Location
- Country: United States
- Territory: Wyoming
- Ecclesiastical province: Denver
- Population: 49,459 (8.5%)

Information
- Denomination: Catholic
- Sui iuris church: Latin Church
- Rite: Roman Rite
- Established: August 2, 1887
- Cathedral: St. Mary's Cathedral
- Patron saint: Our Lady of the Assumption; Saint Joseph; Therese of Lisieux

Current leadership
- Pope: Leo XIV
- Bishop: Steven Biegler
- Metropolitan Archbishop: James R. Golka

Map
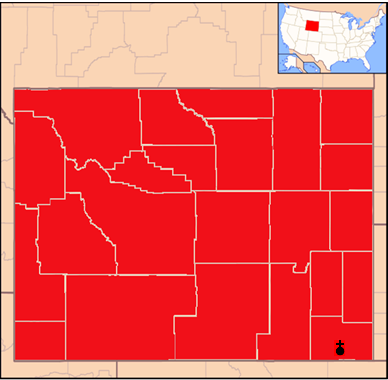

Website
- dcwy.org

The Diocese of Cheyenne (Latin: Dioecesis Cheyennensis) is a diocese of the Catholic Church in the state of Wyoming in the United States. It is a suffragan diocese in the ecclesiastical province of the metropolitan Archdiocese of Denver. The cathedral is St. Mary's Cathedral in Cheyenne, Wyoming. The diocese covers all of Wyoming, as well as the parts of Yellowstone National Park in Montana and Idaho.

== History ==
=== 1800 to 1887 ===
As part of the Louisiana Purchase in 1803, the Wyoming area was theoretically under the ecclesiastical jurisdiction of the Bishop of Louisiana and the Two Floridas in New Orleans. In 1827, the Vatican placed the region under the new Dioceses of St. Louis. In 1840, Jesuit missionary Pierre-Jean De Smet offered the first mass in the Wyoming area, east of the present-day town of Daniel. A monument to the event was later erected on this site. Lake De Smet in Johnston County is named after him.

In 1851, John Miège was installed as vicar apostolic for the Indian Territory East of the Rocky Mountains. The vicariate included the present states of Kansas, Nebraska, Oklahoma, the parts of North and South Dakota west of the Missouri River, Wyoming, Montana, and a part of Colorado.

In 1857, Pope Pius IX established the Apostolic Vicariate of Nebraska from the Apostolic Vicariate of Indian Territory. In 1859, Pius IX named the trappist monk James O'Gorman, prior of New Melleray Abbey, near Dubuque, Iowa, as the vicar apostolic. In 1865, St. Mary's Parish was founded in Evanston to serve the Irish Catholic population there. In 1867, O'Gorman assigned William Kelly as the first resident priest of Cheyenne. Kelly's responsibilities included visiting the railroad camps run by the Union Pacific Railroad west of the town.

Eugene Cusson was the first resident priest assigned to Laramie. In 1875, Cusson persuaded the Sisters of Charity of Leavenworth to come to Laramie, where they opened a hospital in a house donated by the Union Pacific.The Apostolic Vicariate of Nebraska was elevated to the Diocese of Omaha by Pope Leo XIII in 1885. At the time, the diocese included all of Nebraska and Wyoming.

=== 1887 to 1900 ===
On August 2, 1887, Pope Leo XIII erected the Diocese of Cheyenne, removing its territory from the Diocese of Omaha. He appointed Maurice Burke of the Archdiocese of Chicago as the first bishop of Cheyenne.

The Jesuit missionary John Jutz in 1888 started a mission for the Arapahoe people in the Wind River Reservation in western Wyoming. He received $5,000 from Mother Katherine Drexel to build the St. Stephen's Mission. A group from the Sisters of Charity arrived at the mission to set up a school.

By 1889, the diocese had five priests and 5,000 parishioners spread over a huge area. Burke faced attacks by the American Protective Association, an anti-Catholic and anti-Irish hate group. The virulence forced the Sisters of Charity to abandon their institutions in the diocese. Burke traveled to Rome to petition Leo XIII to attach the diocese to a more established one, citing the dire conditions in Wyoming. The pope denied his request. In a letter to Drexel, Burke described himself as a "bishop in name only," having neither parishioners nor priests.

In 1893, Leo XIII finally attached the Diocese of Cheyenne to the Archdiocese of Dubuque, and transferred Burke to the Diocese of Saint Joseph. The Diocese of Cheyenne remained without a bishop for the next three years.

In 1896, Thomas Lenihan of Dubuque was named the second bishop of Cheyenne by Leo XIII. When Lenihan arrived in Cheyenne in 1897, the diocese contained eight priests, nine churches, and one parochial school for 3,000 Catholics. By the time of his death in 1901, the diocese had 6,000 Catholics served in 26 churches by 15 priests, along with four parochial schools.

=== 1900 to 1950 ===
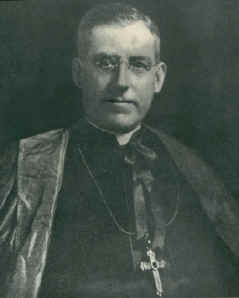
Bishop Keane

In 1902, Leo XIII appointed James Keane from the Archdiocese of St. Paul as the third bishop of Cheyenne. Keane came to Wyoming at a time of increasing population and economic expansion. Keane successfully recruited priests to serve in the diocese. The diocese was incorporated according to Wyoming law. The diocesan parishes were also incorporated, with the bishop, the pastor and two lay trustees serving as a corporate board for each parish.

The newly formed Catholic Church Extension Society in Chicago, Illinois, provided Keane with funds to expand the Catholic presence across Wyoming. He also directed the building of St. Mary's Cathedral in Cheyenne and a new episcopal residence. The cathedral was dedicated in 1909. Keane was named archbishop of Dubuque in 1911.

In 1912, Patrick McGovern from Omaha was appointed the fourth bishop of Cheyenne by Pope Pius X.The first parish in Casper was St. Anthony of Padua, founded by Irish immigrants in 1921. In 1930, McGovern opened the Saint Joseph’s Children’s Home, an orphanage in Torrington. The diocese in 1937 constructed the Chapel of the Sacred Heart on Jackson Lake in Grand Teton National Park for the use of park visitors in the summer.In 1947, Hubert Newell of the Archdiocese of Denver was appointed as coadjutor bishop of Cheyenne.

=== 1950 to present ===
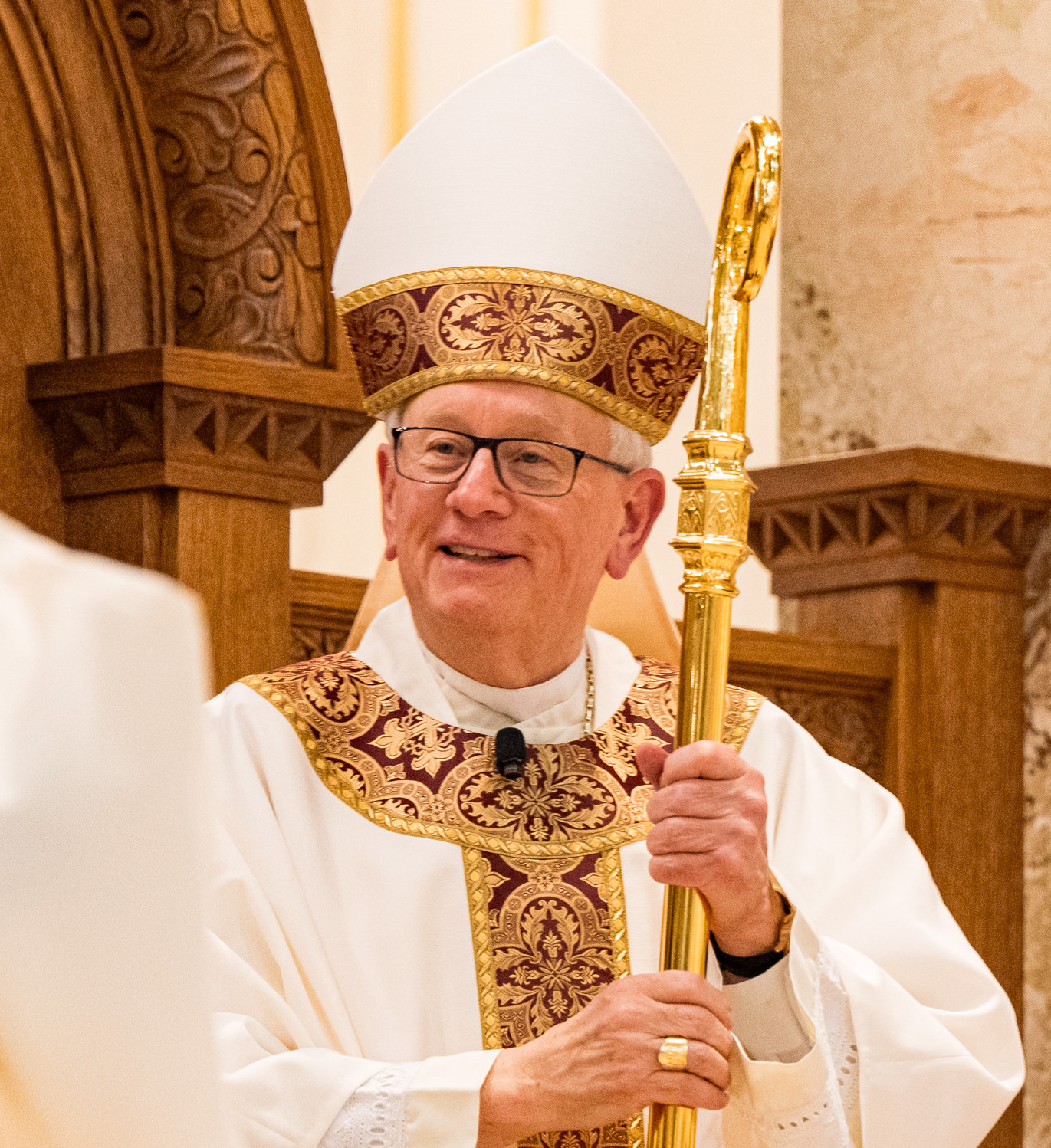
Bishop Ricken (2023)

In 1951, after 39 years as bishop, McGovern died, and Newell automatically succeeded him as bishop. Newell established the diocesan newspaper, The Wyoming Catholic Register, in 1952. Also that year, he dedicated the new DePaul Hospital in Cheyenne, staffed by the Sisters of Charity of Leavenworth.Today it is the Cheyenne Regional Medical Center. Newell set up a Council of Catholic Women in Cheyenne. It was followed by other councils in Wyoming communities and by the Wyoming Council of Catholic Women in 1953. Our Lady of the Mountains Church was dedicated in 1955 in Jackson Hole. Newell resigned as bishop of Cheyenne in 1978.

In 1978, Pope Paul VI named Auxiliary Bishop Joseph Hart of the Diocese of Kansas City-St. Joseph as the sixth bishop of Cheyenne. During his tenure as bishop, Hart established the annual Bishop's Appeal and ordained 25 priests for the diocese. In 1999, David L. Ricken of the Diocese of Pueblo was appointed as coadjutor bishop of the diocese.Hart resigned as bishop of Cheyenne in 2001 and Ricken automatically succeeded him as bishop. In 2004, the John Paul II Catholic School opened in Gillette.

Ricken in 2007 dedicated Wyoming Catholic College in Lander. Ricken oversaw the building of a new building for St. Mary's Catholic School in Cheyenne. In 2008, Pope Benedict XVI named Ricken as bishop of the Diocese of Green Bay.In 2009, Paul D. Etienne from the Archdiocese of Indianapolis was named bishop of Cheyenne. He went on to be archbishop of the Archdiocese of Anchorage in 2016. His replacement in Cheyenne was Steven Biegler, from the Diocese of Rapid City, named in 2017.

As of 2026, Biegler is the bishop of Cheyenne.

=== Sex abuse ===
Anthony Jablonowski was convicted in 2004 of taking indecent, immodest or immoral liberties with a minor during the early 1980s in Guernsey. The priest was sentenced to 15 months to seven years in prison and was later laicized.

Bishop Hart's behavior was surrounded by controversy for years. In 2015, Bishop Etienne requested an investigation of Hart by the Congregation for the Doctrine of the Faith Rome. Etienne suspended Hart from performing masses. In June 2020, the Natrona County District Attorney's Office declined to press charges against Hart. Believing that the case was prosecutable, the Cheyenne police submitted it to the Wyoming Attorney General. Hart was never prosecuted. In January 2021, the Congregation for the Doctrine of the Faith cleared Hart of seven sexual abuse charges and stated that five other charges could not be proven. In its decision, The Congregation rebuked Hart "for his flagrant lack of prudence as a priest and bishop for being alone with minors." Bishop Biegler later stated that he believed the victims.

In June 2019, the diocese released a list of "credibly accused clergy". It mentioned 30 victims, 29 of whom were minors. More victims came forward to the diocese in August 2019.In April 2026, three men sued the diocese, claiming that they had been sexually assaulted during the 1990s by Doug Hudson, a teacher and youth minister at Our Lady of Fatima Parish in Casper. The plaintiffs said that Hudson would ply them with alcohol, then abuse them. They claimed that the diocese did not properly supervise Hudson.

== Statistics ==
As of 2026, the Diocese of Wyoming had 56 diocesan priests serving over 45,000 Catholics.

== Bishops ==
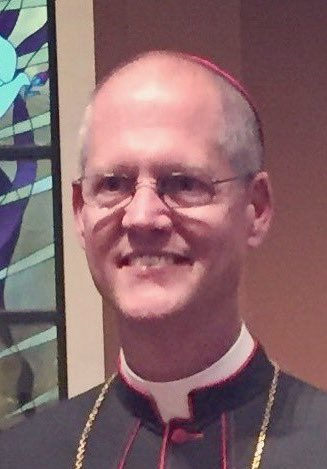
Bishop Etienne (2016)

=== Bishops of Cheyenne ===
1. Maurice Francis Burke (1887–1893), appointed Bishop of Saint Joseph
2. Thomas Mathias Lenihan (1896–1901)
3. James Keane (1902–1911), appointed Archbishop of Dubuque
4. Patrick McGovern (1912–1951)
5. Hubert Newell (1951–1978)
6. Joseph Hubert Hart (1978–2001)
7. David L. Ricken (2001–2008; coadjutor bishop 2000–2001), appointed Bishop of Green Bay
8. Paul D. Etienne (2009–2016), appointed Archbishop of Anchorage
9. Steven Biegler (2017–present)

=== Auxiliary bishop ===
- Joseph Hubert Hart (1976–1978), appointed Bishop of Cheyenne

== Education ==
As of 2026, the Diocese of Cheyenne has six elementary schools and one middle school.

== Sources and external links ==
- Roman Catholic Diocese of Cheyenne Official Site
- GCatholic, with Google map and photo - data for all sections
- Father Steven Biegler selected as ninth bishop of Diocese of Cheyenne
