= Lutheran Hospital =

Lutheran Hospital may refer to:

- Lutheran Hospital, a part of the Cleveland Clinic in Cleveland, Ohio
- Lutheran Hospital of Indiana, in Fort Wayne, Indiana
- Lutheran Hospital of Maryland, a former use of the Hebrew Orphan Asylum in Baltimore, Maryland
- Lutheran Hospital in Wheat Ridge, Colorado
- Advocate Lutheran General Hospital, in Park Ridge, Illinois

== See also ==
- Lutheran Medical Center (disambiguation)
