= Lutheran Medical Center =

Lutheran Medical Center may refer to:

- Lutheran Medical Center (Colorado), in Wheat Ridge, Colorado
- Gundersen Lutheran Medical Center, in La Crosse, Wisconsin
- NYU Lutheran Medical Center, in Brooklyn, New York City

== See also ==
- Lutheran Hospital (disambiguation)
