= David L. Ricken =

American Catholic bishop (born 1952)

His Excellency, The Most Reverend David Laurin Ricken
- Bishop of Green Bay
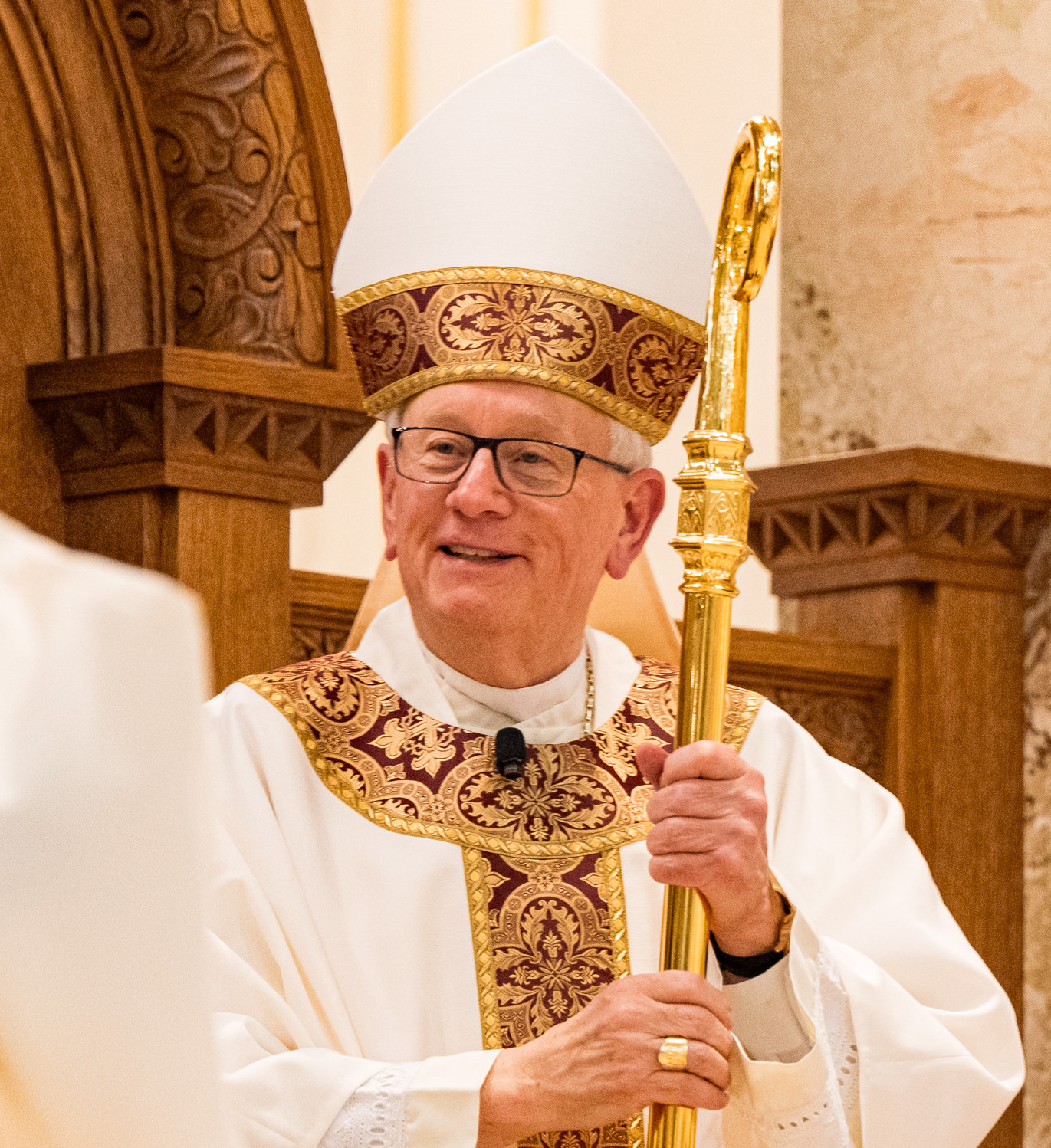
- Bishop Ricken in 2023
- Diocese: Green Bay
- Appointed: July 9, 2008
- Installed: August 28, 2008
- Predecessor: David Zubik
- Previous posts: Bishop of Cheyenne (2001-2008); Coadjutor Bishop of Cheyenne (2000-2001)

Orders
- Ordination: September 12, 1980 by Arthur Tafoya
- Consecration: January 6, 2000 by Pope John Paul II, Giovanni Battista Re, and Marcello Zago

Personal details
- Born: November 9, 1952 (age 73) Dodge City, Kansas
- Education: Pontifical College Josephinum; Conception Seminary College; St. Meinrad School of Theology; Catholic University of Leuven
- Motto: Caritas - sapientia - fortitudo (Charity, wisdom, fortitude)

Styles of David Laurin Ricken
- Reference style: His Excellency; The Most Reverend
- Spoken style: Your Excellency
- Religious style: Bishop

David Laurin Ricken (born November 9, 1952) is an American Catholic prelate who has served as the Bishop of Green Bay since 2008. He previously served as Bishop of Cheyenne from 1999 to 2008.

== Biography ==
=== Early life and education ===
David Ricken was born on November 9, 1952, to George William "Bill" Ricken and Bertha (Davis) Ricken in Dodge City, Kansas. He has a brother, Mark, and a sister, Carol. For his primary education, David Ricken attended Sacred Heart Cathedral Grade School in Dodge City.

Deciding as a teenager to become a priest, Ricken entered St. Francis High School Seminary in Victoria, Kansas, graduating in 1970. He then went to Worthington, Ohio, to study philosophy at the Pontifical College Josephinum. Ricken then attended the Conception Seminary College in Conception, Missouri, graduating there in 1974.

Ricken then entered the St. Meinrad School of Theology in St. Meinrad, Indiana. His final studies were at the Catholic University of Leuven in Leuven, Belgium, where he was awarded a Master of Theology degree in 1980.

=== Ordination and ministry ===
Ricken was ordained to the priesthood by Bishop Arthur Tafoya on September 12, 1980, for the Diocese of Pueblo at La Junta Church in La Junta, Colorado. After his ordination, the diocese assigned Ricken as associate pastor of the Cathedral of the Sacred Heart Parish in Pueblo. In 1985, Tafoya named Ricken as parish administrator of Holy Rosary Parish in Pueblo and vice-chancellor of the diocese.

In 1987, Ricken traveled to Rome to study at the Pontifical Gregorian University, where he earned a Licentiate of Canon Law in 1989. After returning to Colorado, Ricken was named diocesan vocation director and vicar for ministry formation. Tafoya named him as chancellor of the diocese in 1992. The Vatican appointed Ricken as an official of the Congregation for the Clergy in Rome in 1996.

=== Coadjutor Bishop and Bishop of Cheyenne ===
Coat of Arms as Bishop of Cheyenne

On December 14, 1999, Ricken was appointed as coadjutor bishop of the Diocese of Cheyenne by Pope John Paul II to assist Bishop Joseph Hart. Ricken received his episcopal consecration in Rome on January 6, 2000, from John Paul II, with Archbishops Giovanni Battista Re and Marcello Zago serving as co-consecrators, in St. Peter's Basilica. When Hart retired on September 26, 2001, Ricken automatically succeeded him as bishop of Cheyenne.

In early 2002, Hart was accused of repeatedly coercing a 14-year-old boy to expose himself in 1977, when Hart was an auxiliary bishop in Cheyenne. Ricken said that he spoke to Hart about the changes and believed him to be innocent. Hart was cleared in July 2002.

Ricken co-founded Wyoming Catholic College in Lander, Wyoming, in 2005 and established the Wyoming School of Catholic Thought at the new college. Ricken also founded the John Paul II Catholic School in Gillette, Wyoming, and oversaw the construction of a new building for St. Mary's Catholic School in Cheyenne.

=== Bishop of Green Bay ===
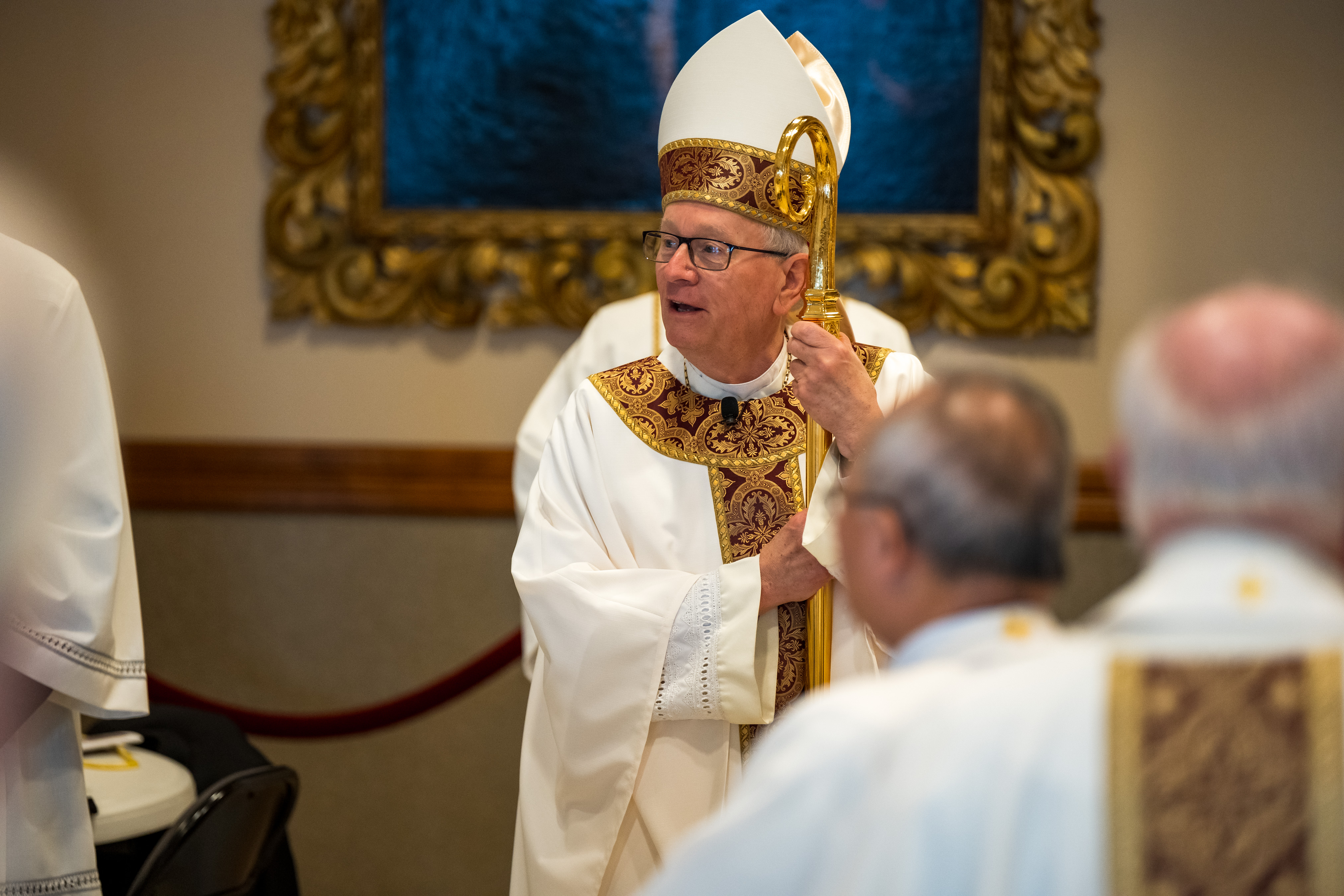
Bishop Ricken in 2023

Pope Benedict XVI named Ricken as the twelfth bishop of Green Bay on July 9, 2008. Ricken was installed on August 28, 2008. In 2015, Ricken criticized St. Norbert College in DePere, Wisconsin, for inviting the journalist Gloria Steinem to speak at the college, due to her support of abortion rights for women.

In 2017, Cheyenne Bishop Steven Biegler determined that the 2002 investigation of Hart was flawed and opened a new one. At that time, more alleged victims voiced accusations against him. During this period, Ricken was criticized for his role in defending him, and possibly protecting him, in 2002. In 2019, Ricken replied: "Well I suppose reading back you could say that, but I did what I knew to do at the time with what I knew, and that’s what I did."

Ricken announced in March 2019 that he was removing the name of Bishop Aloysius J. Wycislo, a former bishop of Green Bay, from the Cathedral Center in Green Bay. Ricken took this action due to Wycislo's failure to address sexual abuse allegations against clergy. In 2021 the Vatican cleared Hart of seven allegations and determined seven other allegations could not be proven beyond a reasonable doubt; however, the Vatican gave Hart a severe reprimand.

In November 2023, Ricken objected to a Christmas tree being exhibited at the National Railroad Museum in Ashwaubenon, Wisconsin, during its yearly Festival of Trees. The tree, prepared by the Satanic Temple of Wisconsin in Chippewa Falls, featured inverted crosses, pentagrams and other satanic symbols. Ricken condemned what he termed the desecration of a traditional understanding of Christmas.

Ricken is a 2009 inductee in the Catholic Education Foundation's Hall of Fame.

== See also ==
- Catholic Church hierarchy
- Catholic Church in the United States
- Historical list of the Catholic bishops of the United States
- List of Catholic bishops of the United States
- Lists of patriarchs, archbishops, and bishops

Catholic Church titles
Preceded by David Zubik	Bishop of Green Bay; 2008 – present	Succeeded by Incumbent
Preceded by Joseph Hubert Hart	Bishop of Cheyenne; 2001–2008	Succeeded by Paul D. Etienne
Preceded by –	Coadjutor Bishop of Cheyenne; 1999–2001	Succeeded by –
