= James Keane (bishop) =

American prelate

His Excellency, The Right Reverend James John Keane D.D.
- Archbishop of Dubuque
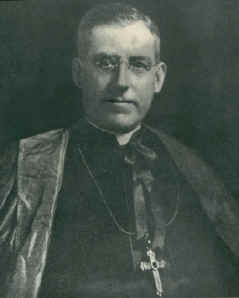
- Church: Roman Catholic Church
- See: Archdiocese of Dubuque
- In office: August 11, 1911 – August 2, 1929
- Predecessor: John Joseph Keane
- Successor: Francis J. L. Beckman
- Previous posts: Bishop of Cheyenne; 1902 to 1911

Orders
- Ordination: December 23, 1882 by Édouard-Charles Fabre
- Consecration: October 28, 1902 by John Ireland

Personal details
- Born: August 26, 1857 Joliet, Illinois, USA
- Died: August 2, 1929 (aged 71) Dubuque, Iowa, USA
- Education: Grand séminaire de Montréal; St. John's Seminary; Xavier College
- Motto: Beati pedes Evangelizantium (Blessed are the feet of the Evangelists)
- Coat of arms

Ordination history of James Keane
History
Episcopal consecration
- Consecrated by: John Ireland
Episcopal succession
Bishops consecrated by James Keane as principal consecrator
- Patrick Aloysius Alphonsus McGovern: April 11, 1912
- James Albert Duffy: April 16, 1913
- Edmond Heelan: April 8, 1919
- Thomas William Drumm: May 21, 1919
- Henry Rohlman: May 20, 1927

James John Keane (August 26, 1857 – August 2, 1929) was an American prelate of the Roman Catholic Church. He served as bishop of the Diocese of Cheyenne in Wyoming from 1902 to 1911, and then as archbishop of the Archdiocese of Dubuque in Iowa from 1911 until his death in 1929.

== Biography ==
=== Early life ===
James Keane was born August 26, 1857, in Joliet, Illinois. When he was a young child, the family moved to Minnesota. He was educated at St. John's Seminary in Collegeville, Minnesota, St. Francis Xavier College in New York City and the Grand Séminaire de Montréal in Montreal, Quebec.

=== Priesthood ===
Keane was ordained a priest in Montreal by Archbishop Édouard-Charles Fabre on December 23, 1882, for the Archdiocese of Saint Paul. After his ordination, the archdiocese assigned Keane as an assistant pastor in parishes within the archdiocese. He soon became a faculty member of the College of St. Thomas in St. Paul, Minnesota. Keane was named president of St. Thomas in 1882. He left that position in 1892 to become pastor of Immaculate Conception Parish in Minneapolis, Minnesota.

=== Bishop of Cheyenne ===
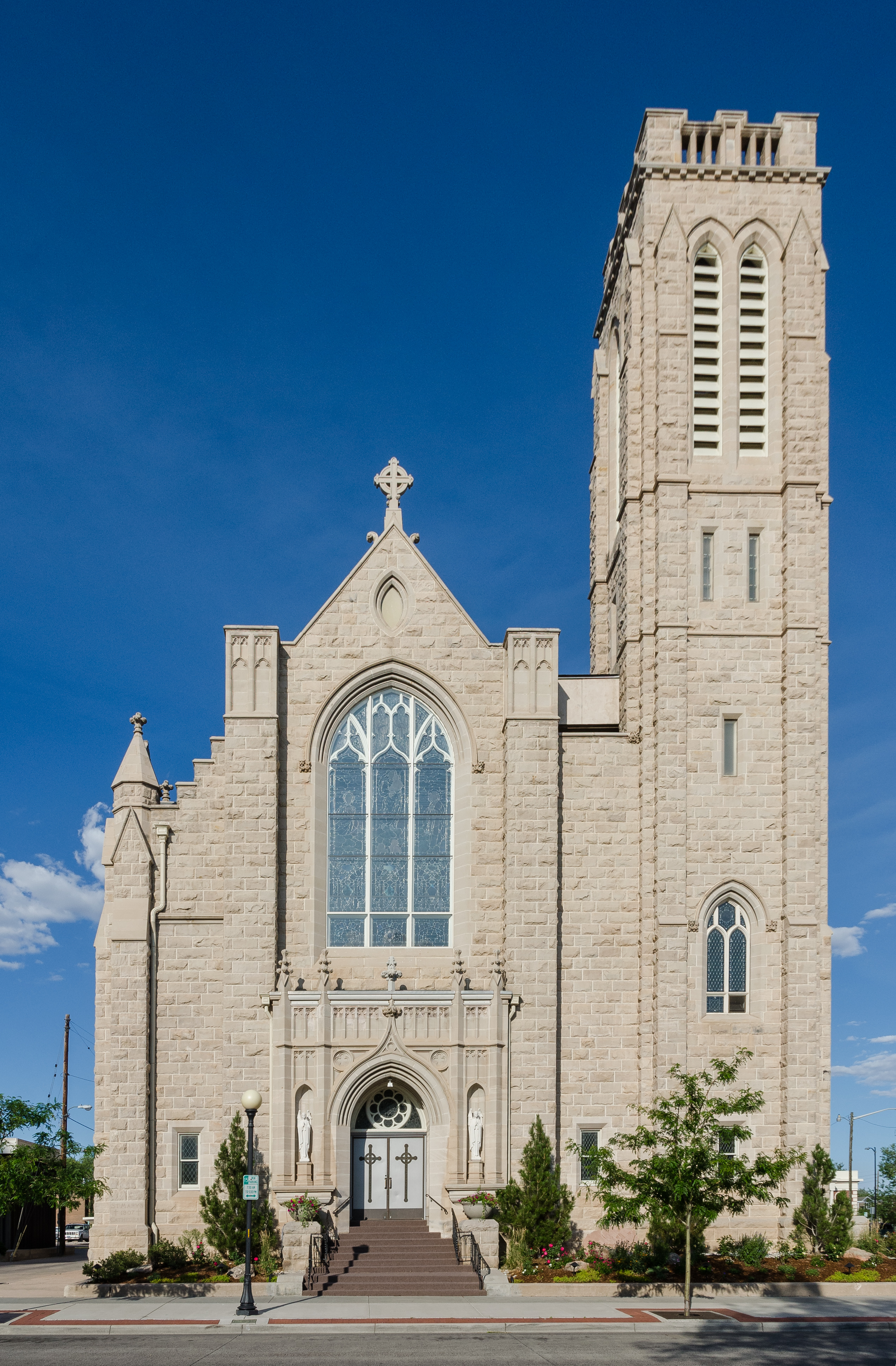
Cathedral of Saint Mary, Cheyenne, Wyoming (2011)

On June 10, 1902, Pope Leo XIII appointed Keane as the third bishop of Cheyenne. He was consecrated at the Cathedral of Saint Paul in St. Paul, Minnesota, on October 28, 1902, by Archbishop John Ireland. Bishops Joseph Cotter and James McGolrick were the principal co-consecrators.

Keane came to Wyoming at a time of increasing population and economic expansion. Keane needed to recruit priests who would be willing to work in the difficult environment of Wyoming, and was successful in doing so. The diocese was incorporated according to the laws of the state of Wyoming. The parishes of the diocese were likewise incorporated with the bishop, the pastor and two lay trustees serving as a corporate board at each parish. He obtained funding from the newly formed Catholic Church Extension Society in Chicago, Illinois, to expand the Catholic presence across Wyoming. Keane also directed the construction of the Cathedral of Saint Mary in Cheyenne and a new episcopal residence. He dedicated the new cathedral in 1909.

=== Archbishop of Dubuque ===
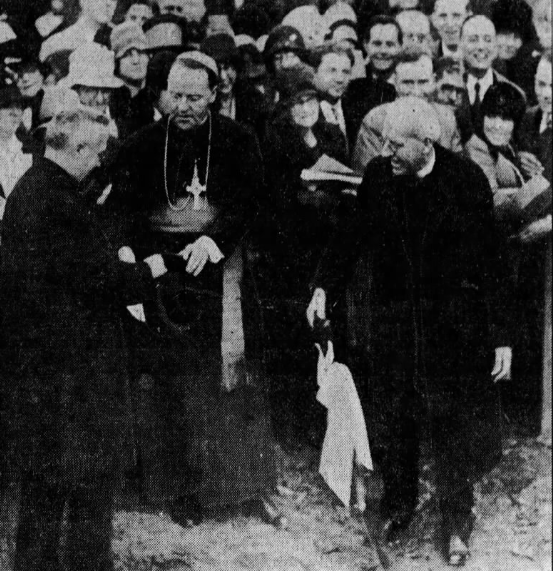
Keane (right) at groundbreaking of St. Mary's Seminary, Baltimore, Maryland (1927)

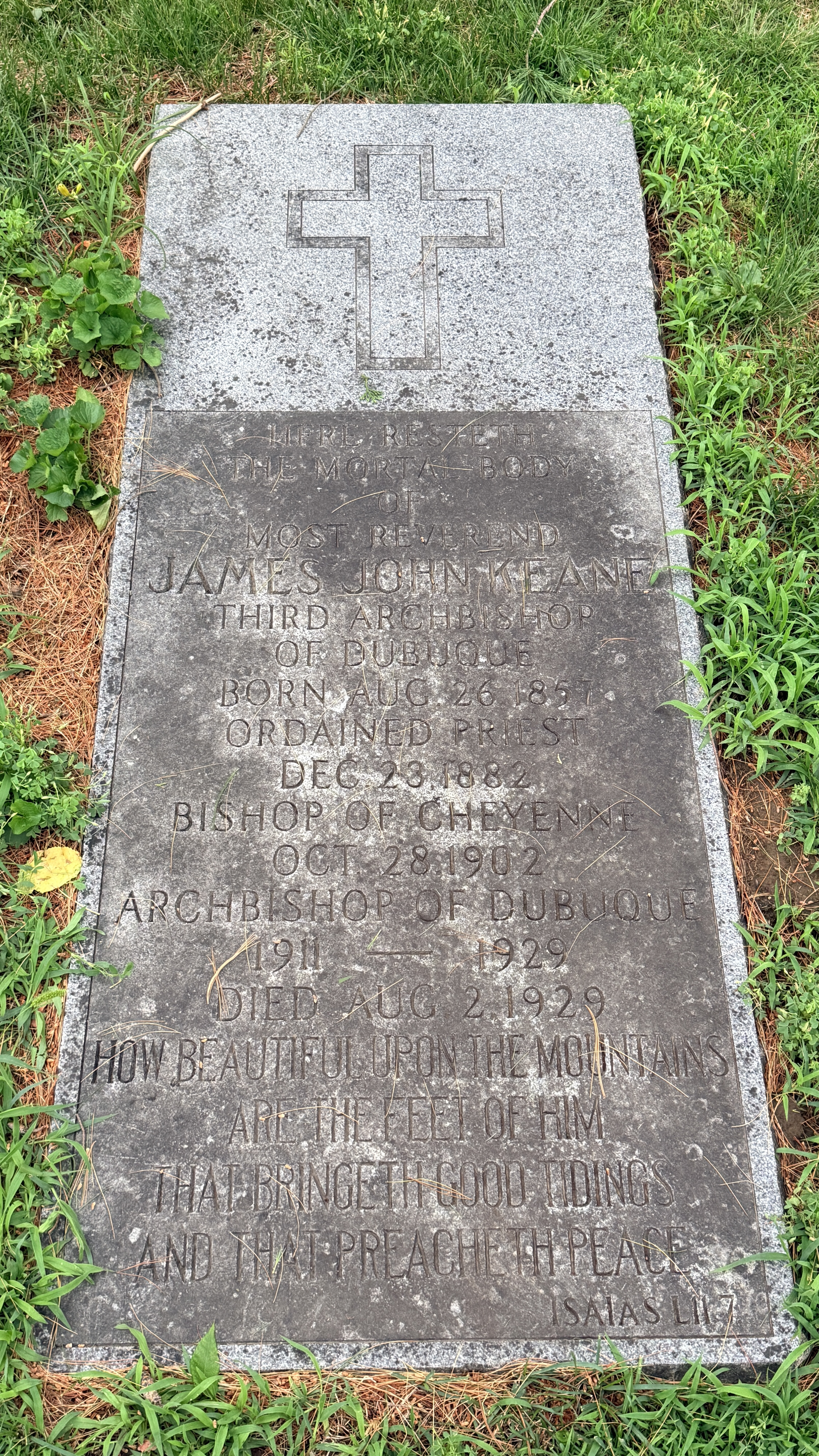
Archbishop Keane’s grave (2026)

Pope Pius X named James Keane as the third archbishop of Dubuque on August 11, 1911. James Keane would gain the nickname "Hickory" due to his stern nature. Along with the Keane appointment, Pius X erected the Diocese of Des Moines out of the western part of the Diocese of Davenport in southern Iowa.

One of Keane's interests as archbishop was St. Joseph College, the Catholic college in Dubuque. By 1917, it had been renamed as Dubuque College. That same year, Keane began an endowment fund for the college; it became one of only seven Catholic colleges or universities in the country with an endowment fund of at least $1 million. Keane secured a $200,000 donation from the Rockefeller Foundation for the college. Dubuque College is today Loras University.

After the American entry into World War I in 1917, Keane became a member of the National Catholic War Council, created to provide Catholic chaplains for the US Armed Forces in France and to coordinate war relief efforts.

A strong believer in Catholic education, Keane insisted that all Catholics in the archdiocese provide financial support to the parochial schools, even if they did not have children attending them. He also started the diocesan newspaper, the Witness.

Keane was a staunch supporter of the temperance movement in the United States and spoke out frequently against alcohol abuse. He also served on the American Commission on Conditions in Ireland of 1920, organized to resolve the Irish War of Independence between the United Kingdom and the Irish Republican Army.

In 1922, Keane organized the catholic schools in the archdiocese into a school system. Keane gained national attention as a speaker in 1926 at the World Alliance for International Friendship Through the Churches in Des Moines, Iowa, his address being broadcast nationally on radio. Keane decreed that Catholics in his diocese who went dancing on Saturday nights should be denied communion at Mass. A popular speaker, Keane's lectures at the University of Iowa in Iowa City, Iowa, and the Iowa State University in Ames, Iowa, were broadcast on radio during the 1920s. In 1928, the Catholic Historical Society was founded in Dubuque, with Keane named as its first president.

=== Death and legacy ===
James Keane died on August 2, 1929, in Dubuque, Iowa. He was buried at Mount Olivet Cemetery in Key West, Iowa.

Catholic Church titles
Preceded by Thomas Mathias Lenihan	Bishop of Cheyenne; 1902–1911	Succeeded by Patrick Aloysius Alphonsus McGovern
