= Melissa Holliday =

American model and actress

Melissa Deanne Holliday

Playboy centerfold appearance
- January 1995
- Preceded by: Elisa Bridges
- Succeeded by: Lisa Marie Scott

Personal details
- Born: October 30, 1969 (age 55); Greenwood, South Carolina, United States
- Height: 5 ft 6 in (1.68 m)

Melissa Deanne Holliday (born October 30, 1969) was Playboy magazine's Playmate of the Month for January 1995. Holliday also made an appearance on Baywatch that same year.

From June 26-July 12, 1995, she underwent ECT for depression at St. John's Hospital and Health Center in Santa Monica, California. She later sued the hospital and the doctors involved in a civil lawsuit over alleged medical malpractice, assault and battery, and personal injury. She has also claimed that: "I've been through a rape, and electroshock therapy is worse".

Holliday has sung at a Chrysler convention and done voice-overs for TV commercials.

== See also ==
- List of people in Playboy 1990–1999

== Notes ==
Melissa Holliday	Lisa Marie Scott	Stacy Sanches	Danelle Folta	Cynthia Gwyn Brown	Rhonda Adams
Heidi Mark	Rachel Jeán Marteen	Donna D'Errico	Alicia Rickter	Holly Witt	Samantha Torres
