= Elisa Bridges =

American actress and model (1973–2002)

- Bridges in 1994

Playboy centerfold appearance
- December 1994
- Preceded by: Donna Perry
- Succeeded by: Melissa Holliday

Personal details
- Born: May 24, 1973 Miami, Florida, U.S.
- Died: February 7, 2002 (aged 28) Los Angeles, California, U.S.
- Height: 5 ft 0 in (1.52 m)

Elisa Rebeca Bridges (May 24, 1973 – February 7, 2002) was an American actress and model. She was Playboy magazine's Playmate of the Month for December 1994, and Playboy's Video Playmate of the Month for September 1996. She appeared in several video productions from Playboy Home Video from 1996 to 2000. After appearing in Playboy, she modeled frequently on assignments in Los Angeles, Miami, and Hawaii. She also appeared as a model for Perfect 10.

== Early life ==
Bridges was born in Miami, on May 24, 1973, and grew up in Dallas.

== Death ==
On February 7, 2002, Bridges died in a guest bedroom of the Benedict Canyon, California mansion of Edward Nahem, a longtime acquaintance of Hugh Hefner. Nahem last saw Bridges the previous evening and knew she had a noon appointment the following day, then became concerned after arriving home that evening and finding her car still in the driveway. He found her unresponsive in her bed and attempted CPR as instructed by 911 operators; paramedics arrived and pronounced her dead on the scene.

The room contained no illegal drugs or drug paraphernalia; a bottle of Xanax was found in her purse and a plastic cup with a white, powdery substance was found in the bathroom wastebasket. Playboy initially stated that she died of natural causes, but an official coroner's report listed her "manner of death is accident ... Acute intoxication by the combined effects of heroin, methamphetamine, meperidine and alprazolam".

== See also ==
- List of deaths from drug overdose and intoxication

Anna-Marie Goddard	Julie Lynn Cialini	Neriah Davis	Becky DelosSantos	Shae Marks	Elan Carter
Traci Adell	Maria Checa	Kelly Gallagher	Victoria Zdrok	Donna Perry	Elisa Bridges
