= SCL Health =

Defunct healthcare system, formerly based in the United States

SCL Health (originally Sisters of Charity of Leavenworth Health Services Corporation) was a nonprofit healthcare system run by the Sisters of Charity of Leavenworth (SCL), a Catholic religious institute based in Leavenworth, Kansas. The healthcare system traced its history to 1864, with the founding of Saint John Hospital in Leavenworth. In the ensuing decades, the religious organization established a number of hospitals and clinics throughout the United States. In 2022, Salt Lake City-based Intermountain Healthcare acquired the system, merging SCL Health's hospitals into its own healthcare system.

== History ==
Beginning in 1864—with the establishment of Saint John Hospital in Leavenworth—through 1952, the Sisters of Charity of Leavenworth built or acquired 18 hospitals in the United States.

In 1972, the religious organization filed articles of incorporation to officially established Sisters of Charity of Leavenworth Health Services Corporation (SCL/HSC), a legal company which would control their hospitals; in 2000 the name was shortened to Sisters of Charity of Leavenworth Health System.

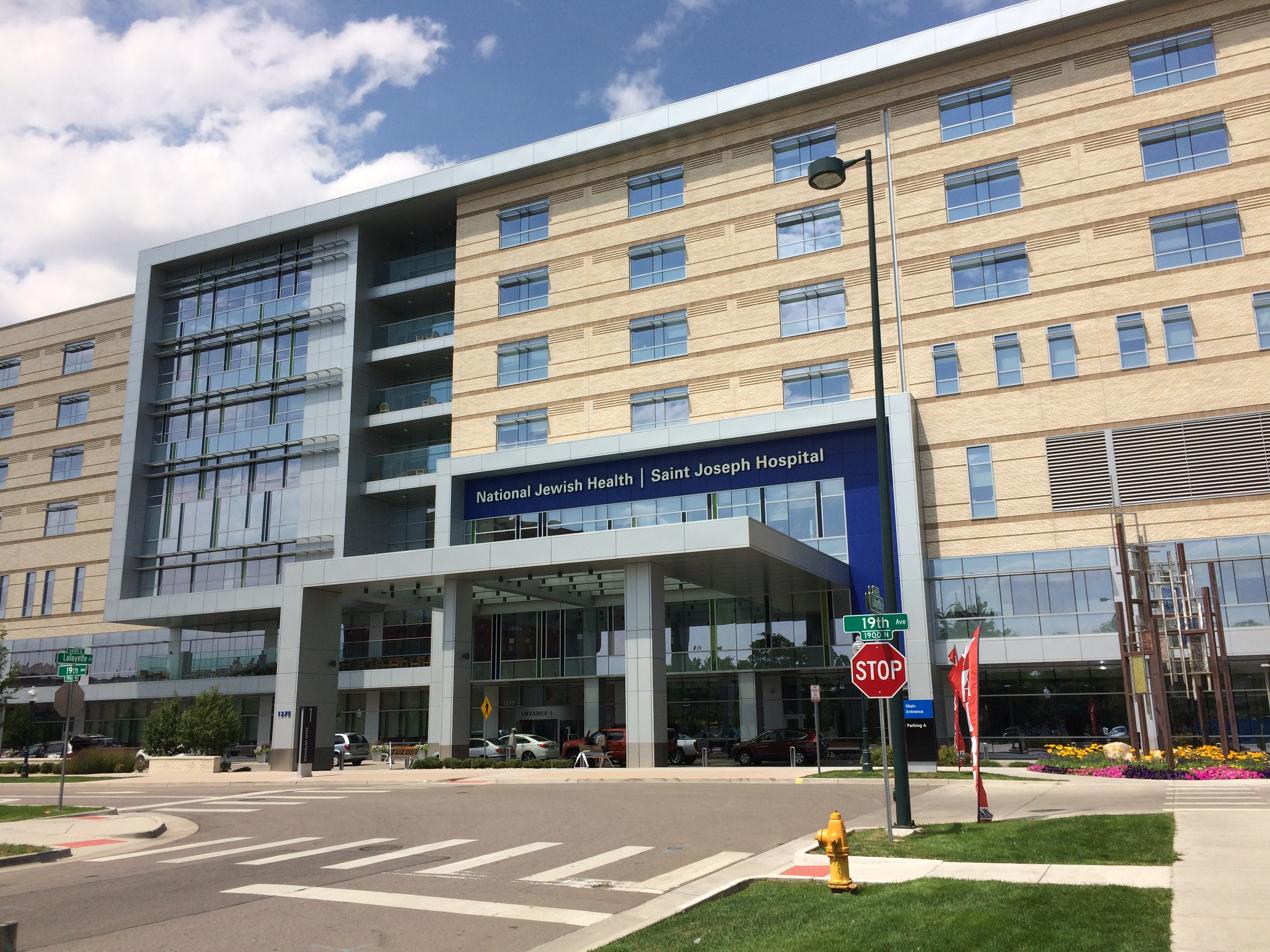
Saint Joseph Hospital in Denver, Colorado formerly belonged to SCL Health

During 2011, the Sisters of Charity of Leavenworth transferred sponsorship of the hospitals to Leaven Ministries, a Catholic juridic person. In 2013, SCL Health sold Saint John Hospital in Leavenworth, its first hospital, to Prime Healthcare.

In 2021, SCL Health announced it would merge with Intermountain Healthcare (IHC) to create a 33-hospital system to operate under the IHC brand. As part of the announcement, it was stated the former SCL Health hospitals would retain their Catholic names and identity, along with following the Ethical and Religious Directives for Catholic Health Care Services (ERDs); the merger was completed in April 2022.

=== Exempla Healthcare ===
During 1997–1998, SCL/HSC's Denver-based Saint Joseph Hospital entered into a joint venture with Lutheran Medical Center (under the control of Lutheran Medical Center Foundation) and Primera Healthcare. The venture established Exempla Healthcare to operate the two hospitals and Primera's physicians network. Exempla then constructed a third hospital, Good Samaritan Medical Center in Lafayette, Colorado. In 2006, steps were taken for SCL Health to acquire Lutheran Medical Center Foundation's stake in Exempla. This resulted in a lawsuit over concerns that Catholic ERDs would be implemented in Exempla's non-Catholic hospitals, which would limit medical services in the region. In 2009, an arbitrator prevented SCL Health from paying for the remaining stake in the company, but allowed it to be transferred for no payment. Exempla was then integrated into SCL Health, with its hospitals shedding the Exempla name in 2014.

== List of former hospitals ==
- Good Samaritan Medical Center – Layfayette, Colorado
- Holy Rosary Hospital – Miles City, Montana
- Lutheran Medical Center – Wheat Ridge, Colorado
- Platte Valley Medical Center – Brighton, Colorado
- Providence Medical Center – Kansas City, Kansas
- St. Anthony's Hospital – Las Vegas, New Mexico
- St. Francis Health Center – Kansas City, Kansas
- Saint John's Health Center – Santa Monica, California
- Saint John Hospital – Leavenworth, Kansas
- Saint Joseph Hospital – Denver, Colorado
- St. James Hospital – Butte, Montana
- St. Mary's Medical Center – Grand Junction, Colorado
- St. Vincent Regional Hospital - Billings, Montana
