= University of Kansas Health System St. Francis Campus =

- University of Kansas Health system Ardent Health Services

Geography
- Location: 1700 SW 7th Street, Topeka, Kansas, United States
- Coordinates: 39°03′23″N 95°41′45″W

Organization
- Care system: Public
- Type: Community
- Affiliated university: University of Kansas Health System

Services
- Beds: 378

History
- Opened: 1909

Links
- Website: kutopeka.com
- Lists: Hospitals in Kansas

University of Kansas Health System St. Francis Campus (KU Topeka), formerly known as St. Francis Health Center is a for-profit hospital and branch of the University of Kansas Medical School in Topeka, Kansas, United States. The hospital was founded in 1909 by the Catholic organization Sisters of Charity of Leavenworth. On May 4, 2017, a press conference announced that The University of Kansas Hospital would take over operations of the hospital from SCL Health, in a partnership with Ardent Health. The purchase was finalized on November 1, 2017.

== Country Legends 106.9 Miracle Marathon for Kids Radiothon ==
Since 2006, KTPK has done a radiothon for the Children's Miracle Network Hospitals (CMN) at St. Francis Health Center in Topeka, Kansas. The radiothon takes place at Topeka's West Ridge Mall, each year during a week in August, on a Tuesday through Thursday from 6 AM to 6 PM. While on air, they not only raise money for the sick and injured children, but tell stories, as well. 2009 was a record breaking year for the fundraiser, as they raised a record breaker $105,205.59, up from 2008, where they raised just over $102,000. Since then, they've raised amounts between $90,000 and $102,000. The Radiothon is the largest fundraiser of the year for the local CMN.
