= Patrick Aloysius Alphonsus McGovern =

American prelate

His Excellency, The Most Reverend Patrick Aloysius Alphonsus McGovern
- Bishop of Cheyenne
- See: Diocese of Cheyenne
- In office: April 11, 1912; November 8, 1951
- Predecessor: James John Keane
- Successor: Hubert Newell

Orders
- Ordination: August 18, 1895 by Richard Scannell
- Consecration: April 11, 1912 by James Keane

Personal details
- Born: October 14, 1872 Omaha, Nebraska, USA
- Died: November 8, 1951 (aged 79) Cheyenne, Wyoming, USA
- Denomination: Roman Catholic
- Education: Creighton University; Mount St. Mary's Seminary
- Motto: Ite ad Joseph (Go to Joseph)
- Coat of arms

Styles of Patrick McGovern
- Reference style: The Most Reverend
- Spoken style: Your Excellency
- Religious style: Monsignor
- Posthumous style: none

Patrick Aloysius Alphonsus McGovern (October 14, 1872 – November 8, 1951) was an American prelate of the Roman Catholic Church. He served as bishop of the Diocese of Cheyenne in Wyoming from 1912 until his death in 1951.

== Biography ==
=== Early life ===
Patrick McGovern was born on October 14, 1872, in Omaha, Nebraska, the son of Patrick and Alice (McGearty) McGovern. After studying under the Sisters of Mercy, he graduated from Creighton University with a Bachelor of Arts degree in 1891. Having decided to enter the priesthood, McGovern enrolled at Mount St. Mary's Seminary in Cincinnati, Ohio.

=== Priesthood ===
He was ordained to the priesthood in Omaha for the Diocese of Omaha by Bishop Richard Scannell on August 18, 1895. In 1898, McGovern was assigned to a pastoral position at St. Philomena's Cathedral Parish in Omaha. While at St. Philomena, he also abolished tuition fees for the parochial school. After the cathedral building was sold, he was named to St. Peter's Parish in Omaha in 1907. He also served as a board member for the Associated Charities in the diocese

=== Bishop of Cheyenne ===
On January 19, 1912, McGovern was appointed the fourth bishop of Cheyenne, by Pope Pius X. He received episcopal consecration at St. Philomena's Cathedral on April 11, 1912. from Archbishop James Keane, with Bishops Scannel and Philip Garrigan serving as co-consecrators. McGovern spent his first four months as bishop at a hospital, recovering from surgical treatment for a stomach ailment.

McGovern was given an honorary doctorate of laws from Creighton University in 1928 and established St. Joseph's Orphanage in Torrington, Wyoming, on September 1, 1930. The Vatican elevated McGovern to the rank of assistant at the pontifical throne in 1937.

McGovern suffered a mental health crisis in 1940, requiring ten weeks of hospitalization. His self-confessed greatest accomplishment during his tenure was increasing the number of clergy servicing diocese; at the time of his arrival, there were only fourteen priests. In 1941, McGovern published History of The Diocese of Cheyenne.

=== Death and legacy ===
Patrick McGovern died in Cheyenne on November 8, 1951, at age 79.

Catholic Church titles
Preceded by James John Keane	Bishop of Cheyenne; 1912–1951	Succeeded by Hubert Michael Newell
