= Saint John's Health Center =

Coordinates: 34.0306°N 118.4790°W

Providence Saint John's Health Center
- Providence Health & Services
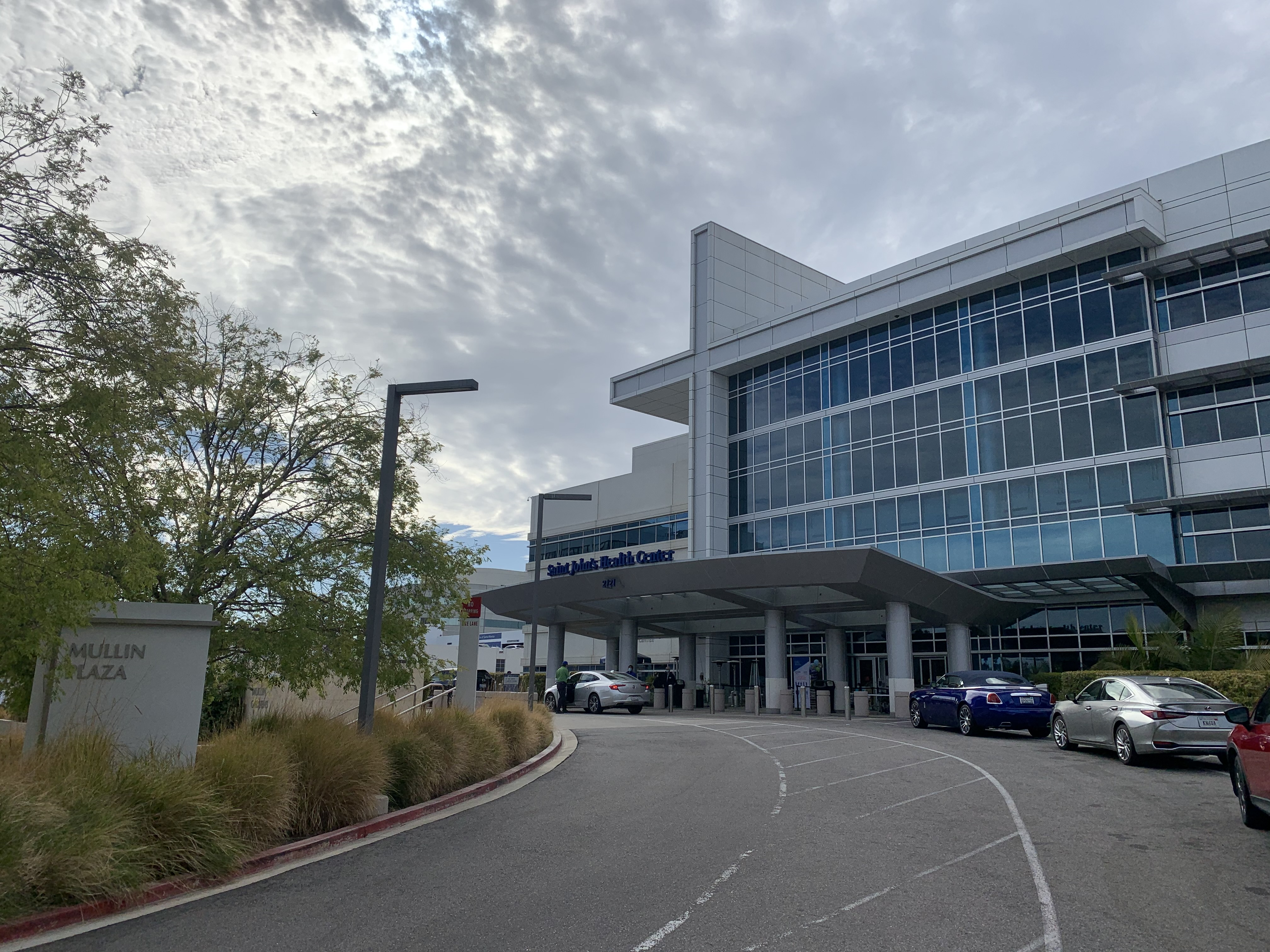
- Exterior entrance to the main building as of April 2021

Geography
- Location: 2121 Santa Monica Boulevard, Santa Monica, California, United States

Organization
- Care system: Private
- Type: Community
- Affiliated university: Providence Health & Services

Services
- Beds: 234

History
- Founded: 1942

Links
- Lists: Hospitals in California

Providence Saint John's Health Center, formerly St. Johns Hospital and Health Center, is a Catholic hospital in Santa Monica, California, United States. The hospital was founded in 1942 by the Sisters of Charity of Leavenworth and was operated by SCL Health. In 2014, the hospital was transferred to Providence Health & Services.

== Notable patients ==
=== Birth ===
- Patricia Kennedy Lawford, gave birth to her son Christopher Lawford on March 29, 1955.
- Choreographer Michael Rooney was born here March 30, 1962.
- Actress Mariska Hargitay was born here on January 23, 1964.
- Comedian Adam Friedland was born here on April 10, 1987.
- Lisa Marie Presley, gave birth to her eldest child Riley Keough in 1989.
- Actresses Katie Holmes, Bridget Moynahan and Brooke Shields gave birth.
- First Lady of California Maria Shriver gave birth and had a nursery ward named in her honor in 2004.
- Victoria Price, daughter of film star Vincent Price, was born there on April 27, 1962.

=== Died ===
- Vaudeville comedian Frank Fay - September 25, 1961.
- Songwriter Cole Porter on October 15, 1964 - kidney failure after surgery.
- Jazz singer Nat King Cole - lung cancer on February 15, 1965.
- Actor Lee Tracy - liver cancer on October 18, 1968.
- Actor Robert Taylor - lung cancer on June 8, 1969.
- Actor Charlie Ruggles - cancer on December 23, 1970.
- Actress Joi Lansing - breast cancer in 1972.
- Actress Irene Ryan - glioblastoma and arteriosclerotic heart disease on April 26, 1973, at age 70.
- Actress Mary Philips - April 22, 1975.
- Radio actor Ken Carpenter - October 16, 1984.
- Television personality Johnny Olson - October 12, 1985, from complications from a stroke.
- Astrologer Carroll Righter on April 30, 1988, of prostate cancer.
- Actress Bonita Granville (1923–1988) - October 11, 1988.
- Actor Ralph Bellamy - November 29, 1991, from a lung ailment.
- Cesar Romero - from complications of a blood clot on January 1, 1994.
- Walter Matthau - cardiac arrest on July 1, 2000
- Actor Les Tremayne - heart failure on December 19, 2003, at age 90.
- Comedian George Carlin - heart failure on June 22, 2008, at age 71.
- Animator Bill Melendez - September 2, 2008, at age 91.
- Actor Patrick McGoohan - January 13, 2009, at age 80.
- Actor Dom DeLuise - May 4, 2009, at age 75 due to kidney failure.
- Actress Farrah Fawcett - June 25, 2009, at age 62 of anal cancer.
- Actor Harve Presnell - June 30, 2009, at age 75.
- Director Blake Edwards - on December 15, 2010, at age 88 from complications from pneumonia.
- Television personality Dick Clark - April 18, 2012, at age 82 of a heart attack.
- Actress Karen Black - from ampullary cancer on August 8, 2013, at age 74.
- Actor Dick Van Patten - complications from diabetes - on June 23, 2015, at age 86.
- Rock guitarist Eddie Van Halen - cerebrovascular accident - on October 6, 2020, at age 65.
- Actress Diane Keaton, October 11, 2025
- Actress Catherine O'Hara, January 30, 2026, at age 71 from a pulmonary embolism.

=== Procedures and treatments ===
- Actor Richard Burton was treated in 1974 for alcoholism.
- Pianist Martha Argerich was treated after melanoma spread to her lungs. After she recovered, she gave a special concert benefiting the hospital.
- Playboy Playmate Melissa Holliday underwent electroconvulsive therapy in 1995.
- Former President Ronald Reagan was taken to St. John's in 2001 after falling and was determined to have a broken hip.
- Governor of California Arnold Schwarzenegger was treated for six broken ribs after a motorcycle accident, and received 15 stitches here after a skiing accident, both in 2006.
- Former First Lady of the United States Nancy Reagan was taken to St. John's after falling in her Bel Air home on February 17, 2008.

== Notable donors ==
Among those who have contributed significant donations to the center are:

- Johnny Carson
- Kay Kyser
- Paula Kent Meehan
- Patrick Soon-Shiong
- Jimmy Stewart
