= Saint Joseph Hospital (Denver) =

Coordinates: 39.7454°N 104.9687°W

- Intermountain Health
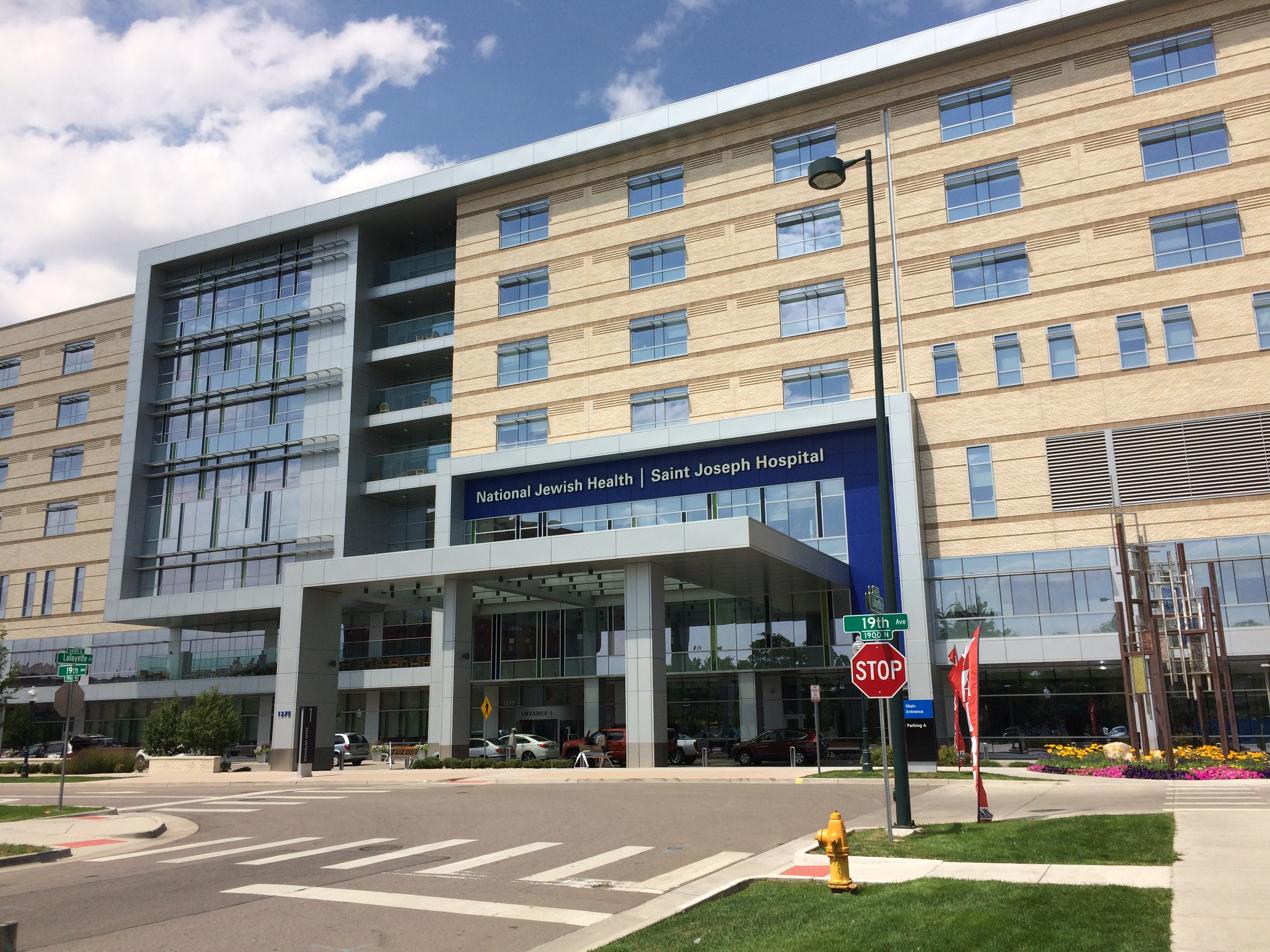

Geography
- Location: 1375 19th Ave., Denver, Colorado, United States

Organization
- Type: General

Services
- Beds: 365

History
- Founded: 1873

Links
- Website: www.saintjosephdenver.org
- Lists: Hospitals in Colorado

Saint Joseph Hospital is a hospital in the City Park West neighborhood of Denver.

== History ==
Saint Joseph Hospital was started when a handful of sisters, with $9 in their pockets, set forth from Leavenworth, Kansas to Denver, Colorado in order to care for the poor and ill. What became known as Sisters of Charity of Leavenworth (SCL) started with a small cottage, and then in September 1873, through donations and begging, opened the first hospital at 1421 Arapahoe Avenue. Soon the sisters found themselves running low on space, and some time in 1874, they moved to a larger structure near the red light district of Denver, at 26th and Holladay (later Market St.). Dr. Augustus L. Justice and Dr. Frederick J. Bancroft became the first physicians on the staff of what was then called the Saint Vincent Hospital, named after the French saint, Father Vincent de Paul.

The name was changed to Saint Joseph Hospital in 1876 - partially in honour of bishop Joseph Machebeuf - when the Sisters moved yet again, this time further east of downtown, at 18th Avenue and Humboldt Street on land donated to them by territorial Governor William Gilpin. This site was directly adjacent to the hospital's present location.

In 2022, Sisters of Charity of Leavenworth's SCL Health merged with and is now part of Intermountain Health.

Construction of the administration building began in 1899. Led by flour baron John K. Mullen, the people of Denver raised $10,000 for this building with a "gigantic city-wide bazaar," and a "monster" euchre (whist) party, planned by Margaret Brown.

In 1961, the ground was broken for the new hospital's twin towers structure.

In 2014, Saint Joseph Hospital completed its current facility located at 1375 E. 19th Avenue and Downing Street in Denver.

== See also ==
- Exempla Healthcare — St. Joseph was part of the Exempla Healthcare group from c. 1997 through 2012, when the group renamed to SCL Health
