= Thomas Mathias Lenihan =

Irish-born American prelate

His Excellency. The Right Reverend Thomas Mathias Lenihan
- Bishop of Cheyenne
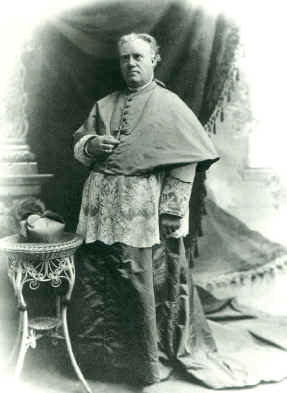
- Church: Catholic Church
- Diocese: Diocese of Cheyenne
- Appointed: December 18, 1896
- Term ended: December 15, 1901 (his death)
- Predecessor: Maurice Francis Burke
- Successor: James John Keane

Orders
- Ordination: November 19, 1867 by John Hennessy
- Consecration: February 24, 1897 by John Hennessy

Personal details
- Born: August 12, 1844 Mallow, County Cork, Ireland
- Died: December 15, 1901 (aged 57) Marshalltown, Iowa, U.S.
- Education: St. Thomas Seminary; St. Vincent's Seminary; Saint Francis de Sales Seminary

Thomas Mathias Lenihan (August 12, 1844 – December 15, 1901) was an Irish-born American prelate of the Catholic Church who served as bishop of the Diocese of Cheyenne in Wyoming from 1896 until his death in 1901. He was the brother of Bishop Mathias Clement Lenihan.

== Biography ==
=== Early life ===
Thomas Lenihan was born on August 12, 1844, in Mallow, County Cork, in Ireland to Edmund and Mary (née Donovan) Lenihan. When he was about five years old, he family immigrated to the United States and settled in Dubuque, Iowa, by 1850. He was raised in the parish of St. Raphael's Cathedral in Dubuque and served as an altar boy there. At his confirmation by Bishop Mathias Loras, Lenihan took the name Mathias in honor of the bishop.

At age 12, Lenihan entered St. Thomas Seminary in Bardstown, Kentucky, where he received his classical education. He then studied philosophy at St. Vincent's Seminary in Cape Girardeau, Missouri. Lenihan completed his theological training at Saint Francis de Sales Seminary in St. Francis, Wisconsin.

=== Priesthood ===
Lenihan was ordained a priest for the Diocese of Dubuque in Dubuque, Iowa, on November 19, 1867, by Bishop John Hennessy at St. Raphael's Cathedral. His younger brother, Mathias Lenihan was ordained in 1879 and become Bishop of Great Falls in Montana, in 1904.

Following his ordination, Lenihan was named pastor of St. Benedict's Parish in Decorah, Iowa. He was transferred in 1870 to serve as pastor of Corpus Christi Parish in Fort Dodge, Iowa, remaining there until 1897. While in Fort Dodge, Lenihan oversaw the completion of the present church in 1881. His charge included an extensive mission that stretched over 200 miles, from Des Moines, Iowa to the Minnesota border and from Ackley to Sioux City, Iowa. He established many new parishes in this area, including Immaculate Conception Parish in Lehigh, Iowa (1881) and St. John's Parish in Vincent, Iowa (1895).

In civic affairs, Lenihan in 1892 was appointed to the state's Russian famine relief committee by Governor Horace Boies. That same year, also spoke out in favor of the prohibition of alcohol and encouraged the formation of temperance societies to combat alcohol abuse.

In 1893, it was reported that the Vatican was planning to erect a new Diocese of Sioux City and appoint Lenihan as bishop. However, the creation of the diocese was postponed for nine years.

=== Bishop of Cheyenne ===
On December 18, 1896, Lenihan was named the second bishop of Cheyenne by Pope Leo XIII. At first there was some confusion in the press, who mistakenly believed that Reverend Bartholomew C. Lenihan, his cousin and the vicar general of Dubuque, had been appointed. Thomas Lenihan received his episcopal consecration on February 24, 1897, from Archbishop Hennessy, with Bishops Henry Cosgrove and Thomas Bonacum serving as co-consecrators, at St. Raphael's Cathedral.

The Diocese of Cheyenne had been without a bishop for nearly four years after his predecessor, Bishop Maurice Burke, had been transferred to the Diocese of Saint Joseph in Missouri and had argued for the suppression of the Wyoming diocese. When Lenihan arrived in Cheyenne in 1897, the diocese contained eight priests, nine churches, and one parochial school for 3,000 Catholics. By the time of his death three years later, the diocese had 6,000 Catholics served by 26 churches, 15 priests, and four parochial schools.

=== Later life and death ===
Lenihan's health deteriorated while in Wyoming due to its high altitude and cold . While retaining his title as bishop, he returned to Iowa in 1901 to live with his brother Mathius in Marshalltown. Despite his poor health, the bishops of the ecclesiastical province of Dubuque recommended that the Vatican name him as bishop of Sioux City (the second time he had been suggested for that office). However, the appointment never came.

Thomas Lenihan died in Marshalltown on December 15, 1901, at age 57.
