= Steven Biegler =

American prelate

His Excellency, The Most Reverend Steven Robert Biegler
- Bishop of Cheyenne
- Archdiocese: Denver
- Diocese: Cheyenne
- Appointed: March 16, 2017
- Installed: June 5, 2017
- Predecessor: Paul D. Etienne

Orders
- Ordination: July 9, 1993 by Charles J. Chaput
- Consecration: June 5, 2017 by Samuel J. Aquila, Robert Dwayne Gruss, and Paul D. Etienne

Personal details
- Born: March 22, 1959 (age 67) Mobridge, South Dakota, US
- Education: South Dakota School of Mines and Technology; Saint Mary's University of Minnesota; Pontifical Gregorian University.
- Motto: Shepherd in compassion

Styles of Steven Robert Biegler
- Reference style: His Excellency; The Most Reverend
- Spoken style: Your Excellency
- Religious style: Bishop

Steven Robert Biegler (born March 22, 1959) is an American prelate of the Catholic Church who was appointed bishop of the Diocese of Cheyenne in Wyoming in 2017.

== Biography ==
=== Early life ===
Steven Biegler was born on March 22, 1959, in Mobridge, South Dakota. He is one of 13 children of Alfred and Mary Biegler. He attended Timber Lake High School in Timber Lake, South Dakota, then entered the South Dakota School of Mines and Technology (SDSM&T) in Rapid City, South Dakota. After one year in college, Biegler went to work on the family farm for the next eight years. He then spent time in a construction crew filling in abandoned coal mines around Glenrock, Wyoming.

By 1986, Biegler had decided to enter the priesthood. He entered Immaculate Heart of Mary Seminary and started course work at Saint Mary's University of Minnesota, both in Winona, Minnesota. Biegler graduated from Saint Mary's in 1989 with a Bachelor of Philosophy degree. After finishing at St. Mary's, he entered the Pontifical North American College in Rome while studying at the Pontifical Gregorian University. He received a Bachelor of Sacred Theology degree in 1993 from the Gregorian.

=== Priesthood ===
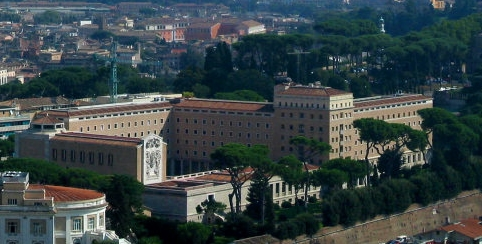
Pontifical North American College, Rome, Italy (2010)

Biegler was ordained to the priesthood for the Diocese of Rapid City on July 9, 1993, by Archbishop Charles Chaput at Holy Cross Church in Timber Lake. After his ordination, Biegler had numerous pastoral assignments in South Dakota parishes:

- Associate pastor of Our Lady of Perpetual Help Cathedral Parish in Rapid City from 1993 to 1994
- Administrator for three parishes: Immaculate Conception in Bonesteel, St. Anthony's in Fairfax, and St. Francis Xavier in Ponca Creek, from 1996 to 2003
- Co-pastor at St. Bernard in McLaughlin and St. Bonaventure in McIntosh from 2001 to 2003
- Pastoral assignments at St. Aloysius in Bullhead, Assumption of the BVM in Kenel, St. Bede in Wakpala and St. Michael in Watauga from 2001 to 2003

In addition to his pastoral assignments, Biegler served on the college of consultors and the presbyteral council for the diocese. In 2003, Biegler returned to Rome to serve as director of apostolic and pastoral formation at the North American College, serving there until 2006. He remained in Rome until 2007, working as the assistant to the rector of the Casa Santa Maria, a residence for priests at the college. Biegler returned to Rapid City in 2007 to assume several posts:

- Chaplain for the Rapid City Catholic Schools
- Chaplain for the Newman Center at SDSM&T
- Pastoral position at St. Michael Parish in Hermosa, South Dakota

In 2009, Biegler resumed his work on the college of consultors and the, presbyteral council. He gave up his chaplaincy and pastoral assignments in 2010 to serve for one year as diocesan administrator after the departure of Bishop Blase J. Cupich. With the installation of a new bishop, Biegler was appointed pastor of Our Lady of the Black Hills Parish in Piedmont, South Dakota. Bishop Robert Gruss named Biegler as vicar general for the diocese in 2013. He was moved from Our Lady in 2015 to become pastor of the Cathedral of Our Lady of Perpetual Help Parish and of St. Michael Parish.

=== Bishop of Cheyenne ===
Pope Francis appointed Biegler as the ninth bishop of Cheyenne on March 16, 2017. On June 5, 2017, Biegler was consecrated during an installation mass at the Cheyenne Civic Center in Cheyenne. Archbishop Samuel J. Aquila was his consecrator, with Gruss and Bishop Paul D. Etienne serving as co-consecrators. Biegler is a member of the Jesus Caritas, a fraternal organization for priests.

Soon after taking office, Biegler ordered the diocese to reexamine sexual abuse allegations against Bishop Emeritus Joseph Hart, a former bishop of Cheyenne. In 2019, Biegler announced that the Congregation for the Doctrine of the Faith at the Vatican was investigating Hart, who denied all the accusations. In 2021, the Congregation exonerated Hart of several charges and said it had insufficient evidence to prove several others. However, it reprimanded Hart for bad decision-making. Local prosecutors declined to indict Hart on any crimes. After the Congregation's decision, Biegler stated that he believed the victims.

In the 2019 Fall meeting of the U.S. Conference of Catholic Bishops (USCCB), Biegler said that priests needed to refocus their efforts on being pastors, to rebuild trust in the church in the wake of the sexual abuse scandals.In 2022, after the Wyoming Legislature passed a bill severely limiting access to abortion procedures in that state, Biegler called on state legislators to provide more assistance to needy pregnant mothers and their children.

== See also ==
- Catholic Church hierarchy
- Catholic Church in the United States
- Historical list of the Catholic bishops of the United States
- List of Catholic bishops of the United States
- Lists of patriarchs, archbishops, and bishops

Catholic Church titles
Preceded by Paul D. Etienne	Bishop of Cheyenne; 2017-Present	Succeeded by Incumbent
