= Thimida Regia =

Former Roman city and modern titular see

Coordinates: 36.640739°N 10.141835°E

Africa Proconsularis.

Thimida Regia is a former Roman city of the Roman province of Byzacena in North Africa (modern Tunisia). The town was the episcopal see of an ancient Christian diocese which flourished until the arrival of Arab armies in the 640s. That diocese survives today only as a Latin Church titular see of the Catholic Church, and has effectively ceased to function. The current bishop is Dominic Nguyên Tuan Anh auxiliary bishop of Roman Catholic Diocese of Xuân Lộc.

The ancient town is identified with ruins at 36.640739n, 10.141835e, south of the modern town of Tunis.
