= St. Mary's Catholic Cathedral (Cheyenne, Wyoming) =

Historic church in Wyoming, United States

- U.S. National Register of Historic Places
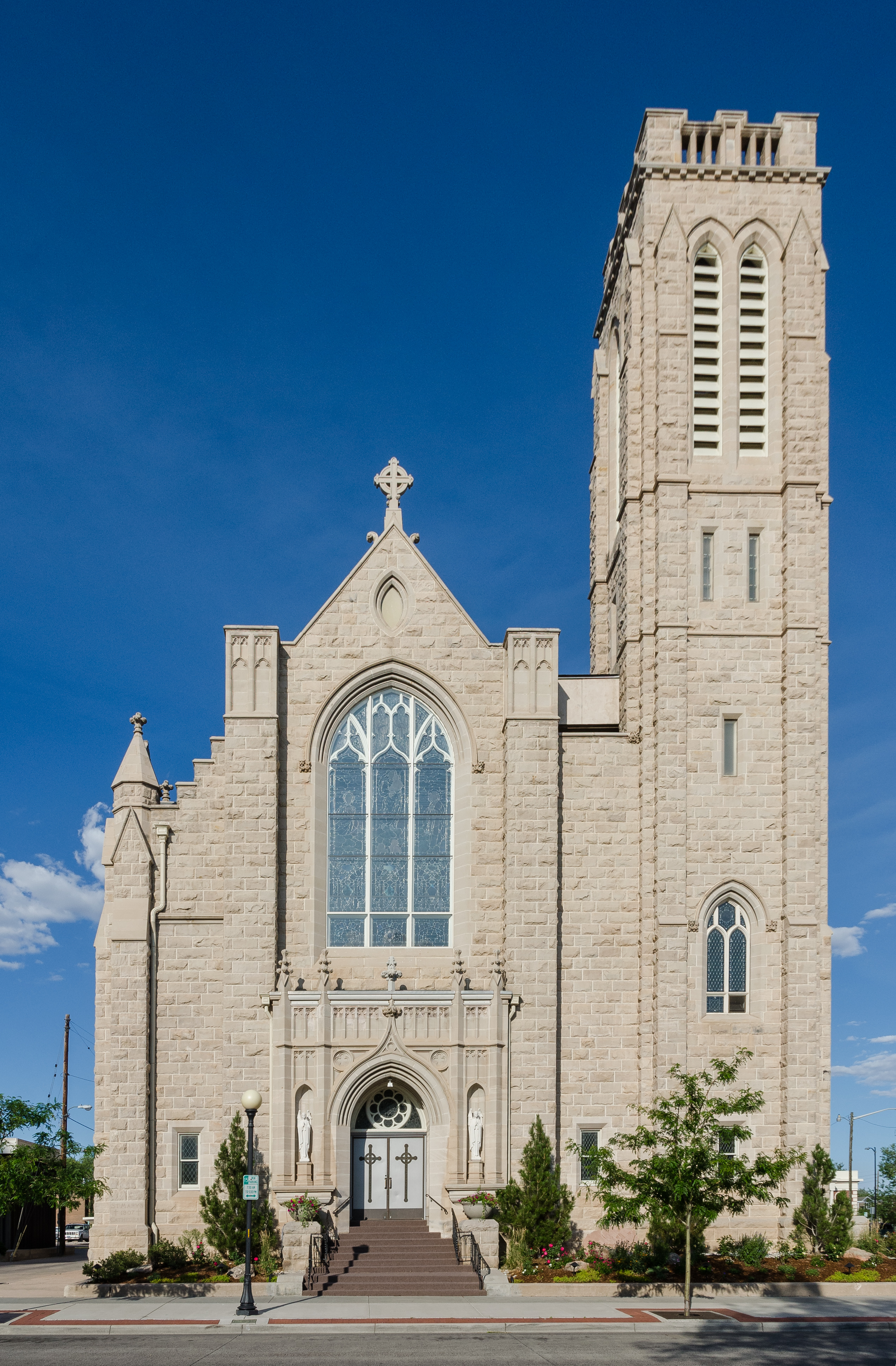

- Location within Wyoming Location within the United States
- Location: 2107 Capitol Avenue; Cheyenne, Wyoming
- Coordinates: 41°8′15″N 104°49′3″W
- Built: 1906-1909
- Built by: Moses Patrick Keefe
- Architect: Fisher and Lowery
- Architectural style: Gothic Revival
- NRHP reference No.: 74002026
- Added to NRHP: November 20, 1974

St. Mary's Cathedral is the cathedral and parish church in the Diocese of Cheyenne located in Cheyenne, Wyoming, United States. It was listed on the National Register of Historic Places in 1974.

== Description ==
Reverend William Kelly founded the parish as St. John the Baptist in 1867 and erected a frame church. Ten years later, a brick structure replaced it. After Pope Leo XIII established the Diocese of Cheyenne in 1887 the church was rededicated to St. Mary. The congregation outgrew the brick church and Bishop James J. Keane, third bishop of Cheyenne, started plans to build a new cathedral and bishop's residence.

Construction of the new cathedral began in 1906. The architectural firm of Fisher and Lowery from Omaha designed the building. Bishop Keane and the Reverend James A. Duffy acquired the necessary funds and a site for construction. An estimated 5,000 people attended the laying of the cornerstone on Sunday, July 7, 1907. Prominent Wyoming builder Moses Patrick Keefe was responsible for constructing the cathedral. The sandstone for the exterior was quarried at Iron Mountain, north of Cheyenne. On January 31, 1909, Bishop Maurice Burke of St. Joseph, Missouri, who had been the first bishop of Cheyenne, consecrated the cathedral. Bishop John Carroll of Helena, Montana delivered the sermon.

The 135-by-70-foot (41 by 21 m) cathedral is in the Gothic Revival style and features two side galleries and a rear organ loft. The ceiling is supported by steel and concrete arches faced with oak.

The total construction costs equaled $125,000, and the building was debt-free when completed. The stained glass windows are donated memorials crafted in Europe. The large Madonna window in the organ loft was a gift of the Knights of Columbus. Parish records do not contain information about the artists or installation dates. In 1962, the parish added a structure east of the cathedral to house meeting and activity rooms at a cost of $200,000.

The Visser-Rowland Organ Company constructed its Opus 92 for the cathedral in 1991. The instrument features 38 stops and 53 ranks and was dedicated in March, 1992.

== See also ==
- List of Catholic cathedrals in the United States
- List of cathedrals in the United States
