= Intermountain Health Lutheran Hospital =

- Intermountain Health
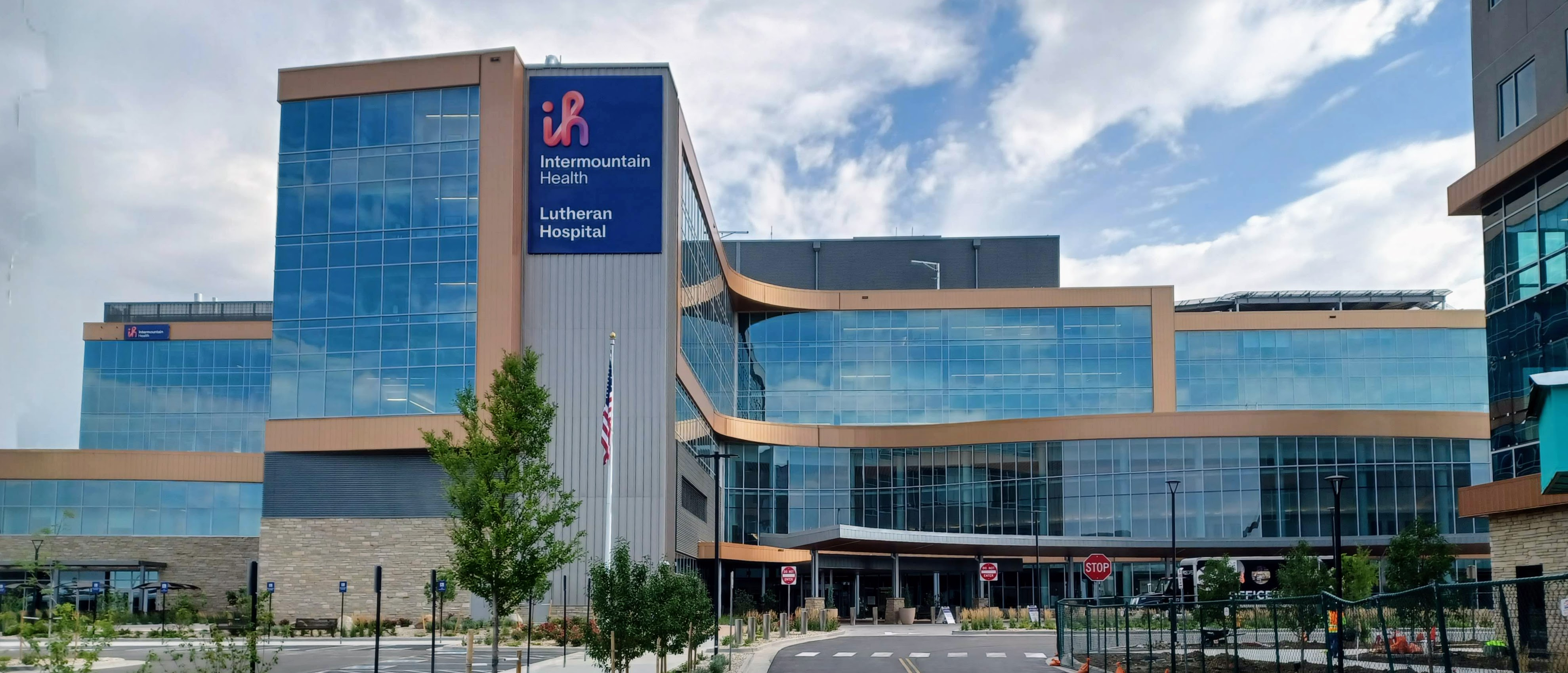
- Hospital prior to opening in August of 2024

Geography
- Location: 12911 W 40th Ave, Wheat Ridge, Colorado, United States
- Coordinates: 39°46′18″N 105°08′44″W

Organization
- Type: General

Services
- Emergency department: Level II trauma center
- Beds: 226

History
- Founded: 1905

Links
- Website: intermountainhealthcare.org/locations/intermountain-health-lutheran-hospital
- Lists: Hospitals in Colorado

Intermountain Health Lutheran Hospital is a hospital in Wheat Ridge, Colorado.

== History ==
On May 6, 1903, members of St. John's Lutheran Church in Denver met to begin planning a TB sanitarium for the region. In 1905, the Evangelical Lutheran Sanitarium, a tent colony for tuberculosis patients, opened in Wheat Ridge, a few miles west of Denver's city limits. As the demand for tuberculosis treatment waned, the facility moved toward serving Jefferson County as a general medical facility. Lutheran Hospital opened in 1961 and grew along with the county, expanding significantly in 1964 and 1968. The 1970s brought a name change to Lutheran Medical Center, a six floor tower addition in 1973, and expansion of the Critical Care Unit in 1985.

In 1997, Lutheran Medical Center, Saint Joseph Hospital and the Primera Healthcare physician group integrated to form Exempla Healthcare.

In 2010, a new 12 room operating suite, an 18-bed recovery room and a 24-bed pre-surgery area opened in the five-story North Pavilion addition, as part of a five-year building project that added 295,000 square feet to the campus.

On August 3, 2024, the new Intermountain Health Lutheran Hospital opened with the transporting of patients from the old 38th Avenue to the new 40th Avenue location.
