= Sisters of Charity of Leavenworth =

Catholic religious institute

- Abbreviation: SCL
- Formation: 1858
- Type: Religious organization
- Legal status: active
- Headquarters: Leavenworth, Kansas
- Location(s): 4200 South 4th Street Leavenworth, Kansas 66048
- Region served: United States
- Members: 153 (2025)
- Community Director: Sr. Eileen Haynes
- Parent organization: Sisters of Charity Federation
- Affiliations: University of Saint Mary
- Website: SCL website

The Sisters of Charity of Leavenworth is a Catholic religious institute based in Leavenworth, Kansas who follow in the tradition of Saints Vincent de Paul and Louise de Marillac. A member of the Sisters of Charity Federation in the Vincentian-Setonian Tradition, the order operates schools and hospitals in the United States and Peru. Members use the post-nominal letters SCL.

== History ==
The Sisters of Charity of Leavenworth developed from the congregation of the Sisters of Charity of Nazareth, headquartered in Bardstown, Kentucky.

=== Mother Xavier Ross ===
Mother Xavier Ross was born Ann Ross in Cincinnati, Ohio on November 17, 1813, one of five children of Richard and Elizabeth Taylor Ross. Her father was a Methodist preacher. At the age of sixteen she converted to Roman Catholicism, much to the consternation of her father. Her Father would never forgive her for this, He later sent a lock of his hair that had turned gray with the words, “You did this”. She was not a physically large person standing at just barely five feet tall but she had what would later be written as the “will of a winner by a contemporary.” Not long after she joined the Sisters of Charity of Nazareth, and upon completion of her novitiate was sent to Louisville, Kentucky to teach at the Orphan Asylum. Ann was renamed Xavier after the 16th-century Jesuit Missionary St. Francis Xavier. In 1853 she was transferred to Nashville, Tennessee, and later to Helena, Montana to take charge of the Academy there.

In 1858 Mother Xavier Ross came to Leavenworth, from Nashville, Tennessee, at the invitation of Bishop John Baptiste Miege. However, The Sisters of Charity were also in great debt due to being “under a bishop who was ultimately unable to sponsor them.” Before Mother Xavier left for Leavenworth, the community commenced a Novena to Mary, Queen of Heaven. This became a particular tradition. She gradually lost her hearing, and by 1858 was obliged to use an ear trumpet.

The very first interaction between Mother Xavier and Bishop Miege went as smoothly as it could have gone. Mother Xavier was presenting her case on why she and her community should be accepted into the bishop’s diocese. The acceptance went thought as “The bishop recognized before him a woman of the highest integrity who had undergone a severe trial and was capable of enduring even more.”

Within a week of arriving in Leavenworth, the sisters were teaching in a boys’ school. The days that followed found them opening an academy for girls, visiting wagon trains and traveling to towns to tend the sick during epidemics. They educated black children who had fled to the free state of Kansas, took in orphans, and visited prisoners. In 1864 the Sisters opened the first private hospital in Kansas. Sister Joanna Bruner, trained nurse taught nursing to other Sisters.

==== Present Day: The Legacy of Mother Xavier ====
Currently, on the campus of the University of Saint Mary, the multi-level building called Xavier Hall is the first building that encircles the campus. Xavier Hall is connected to Saint Mary Hall and Mead Hall. Xavier Hall has a theater, music, history, and political science classes. The first floor of Xavier Hall is the fine arts area which is used for fine arts classes with an art studio and Goppert Gallery. Within Goppert Gallery, they hold art exhibits which are mainly by the art students at the University of Saint Mary. The second floor of Xavier Hall has the Art, History, Political Science, and Theater departments. The third floor of Xavier Hall has the Xavier Theater which is used for many different purposes including orientation for students and for plays that are put on by the theater department.

=== Evangelizing Native Americans ===
The Sisters of Charity had already thought about making their journey to Leavenworth when they heard from Bishop Miege about the abundance of land they can use to continue their labors of charity. Not to mention, the Sisters would also be able to meet the Native Americans who had possessed the land first, “...and eventually they hoped to be employed in evangelizing the Indians, a work for which they most ardently longed.” When Mother Xavier returned back to Nashville, she could only report back to the Sisters that there were four Indian tribes; Pawnee, Osage, Kansa, and the Paducah. While the Sisters listened, ““The young Sisters sat by waiting, if possible, to get in a word 'edgewise' to ask Mother 'if she saw any Indians,’ for the word Indian, missionary, Far West, Wigwam, Squaw, Papoose, tomahawk, stake, scalp, and the like, had great attractions for them.-". Although the Sisters never succeeded in evangelizing the Native Americans in Leavenworth, Kansas, they did successfully establish a school on the Wind River Reservation in Wyoming at the Indian assimilation school named St. Stephen’s Mission School in January 1889.

Although the objective in the 1860s to the 1890s was to convert Native Americans to Catholicism, that is no longer their mission. According to a 2023 statement, the Sisters of Charity of Leavenworth, “We, the Sisters of Charity of Leavenworth, are in the process of educating ourselves about the St. Stephen’s Mission School. We will review our history and other historical sources to gain a fuller understanding of the history of Native American schools. We will take our time to fully explore the injustices these schools inflicted upon Native American peoples and then seek to achieve a true and deep reconciliation.” This statement came out after the list of Catholic run Native Boarding schools in the United States was released by the Catholic Truth and Healing Organization.

=== Expansion ===
There were 12 original Sisters that made the migration West. On November 12, 1858, the first five arrived. At the first of December that same year, five more sisters arrived West. The final two, including Mother Xavier, made their trip on February 21, 1859. In 1863, Miege wanted the Sisters to have their own hospital to tend the sick and those in need. The very next year on March 15, 1864, the hospital opened its doors.

By 1868, the Sisters of Charity were in need of a Mother House. Bishop Miege was ready and approved the idea of building the Academy, “Bishop Miege, taking a small linen robe from his buggy, spread it on the grass and said, ‘This is where your house shall be.’” The bishop purchased 15 acres of land (was then given 5 free) and on Feast of St. Catherine of Siena, the foundation of the Mother House was laid. Interestingly enough, the ground plan of the Mother House is in the formation of a cross.

The Sisters of Charity of Leavenworth came to the Montana gold camp of Helena in 1869 at the invitation of the Jesuits to teach youth, care for orphans, and minister to the sick in the frontier community. There they founded St. Joseph’s Home, the territory’s first orphanage. In 1873, they founded St. Joseph Hospital in Denver, Colorado. In 1875, another St. Joseph’s Hospital was established in Laramie, Wyoming, and soon after, St. Mary’s Academy there soon after. Eventually becoming known as SCL Health, the healthcare system was merged into Intermountain Health in 2022.

They founded and operate the University of Saint Mary in Leavenworth, Saint John's Health Center in Santa Monica, California, and St. Francis Health Center in Topeka. From 1864 to 1952, the Sisters of Charity of Leavenworth established or assumed responsibility for 18 hospitals from Kansas to California.

Since the 1960s, the Sisters of Charity have expanded work in social services and outreach, and operate missions in South America and Italy. In one of Bishop Miege’s final letters as a bishop that he sent out, he expressed that his choice to bring the Sisters of Charity was, “one of the very few good things I ever did for Kansas.”

== See also ==
- Sisters of Charity
