= Kenneth Steiner =

American prelate of the Catholic Church (born 1936)

His Excellency, The Most Reverend Kenneth Donald Steiner
- Auxiliary Bishop of Portland in Oregon
- Church: Catholic
- Archdiocese: Portland in Oregon
- Appointed: November 28, 1977
- Installed: March 2, 1978
- Retired: November 25, 2011
- Other posts: Titular Bishop of Avensa (1977– ); Auxiliary Bishop Emeritus of Portland in Oregon (2011– )

Orders
- Ordination: May 19, 1962 by Edward Howard
- Consecration: March 2, 1978 by Cornelius Michael Power, Elden Francis Curtiss, and Alfredo Méndez-Gonzalez

Personal details
- Born: November 25, 1936 (age 89) David City, Nebraska, US
- Education: Mount Angel Seminary High School and College; St. Thomas the Apostle Seminary
- Motto: To serve and to unite
- Coat of arms

Styles of Kenneth Donald Steiner
- Reference style: His Excellency; The Most Reverend
- Spoken style: Your Excellency
- Religious style: Bishop

Kenneth Donald Steiner (born November 25, 1936) is an American prelate of the Catholic Church. He served as auxiliary bishop of the Archdiocese of Portland in Oregon from 1978 to 2011.

== Biography ==
=== Early life ===
Kenneth Steiner was born on November 25, 1936, in David City, Nebraska, one of five children of Lawrence and Florine Steiner. Kenneth Steiner barely survived a bout of pneumonia when he was one month old. Lawrence Steiner died when Kenneth was very young, and the family then moved to Oregon, where he attended St. Rose Grade School in Portland.

While studying at Mount Angel Seminary High School and College in Saint Benedict, Oregon, Kenneth Steiner worked at Blanchet House, a residence for homeless men in Portland, and at a farm in Yamhill County. After finishing at Mount Angel in 1958, Steiner entered St. Thomas the Apostle Seminary in Kenmore, Washington. He graduated from St. Thomas in 1962.

=== Priesthood ===
Steiner was ordained into the priesthood for the Archdiocese of Portland in Oregon by Archbishop Edward Howard on May 19, 1962. After his ordination, Steiner was assigned as an associate pastor at St. Monica Parish in Coos Bay, Oregon, where he remained until 1967. He then served at St. Mary's Cathedral Parish (1967–1970) and at St. Stephen Parish (1970–1972), both in Portland. In Portland, Steiner also began a marriage preparation program and a ministry to divorced and separated Catholics. At one of his parishes, he allowed the homeless to camp outside his residence.

In 1972, Steiner was named pastor of Holy Name Parish in Coquille, Oregon, with its missions in Myrtle Point, Oregon and Powers, Oregon. He then served as pastor of St. Francis of Assisi Parish in Roy, Oregon (1976–1978) and chairman of the Priests' Personnel Committee (1976–1977).

=== Auxiliary Bishop of Portland in Oregon ===
On November 28, 1977, Steiner was appointed as an auxiliary bishop of the Archdiocese of Portland in Oregon and titular bishop of Avensa by Pope Paul VI. Steiner received his episcopal consecration on March 2, 1978, from Archbishop Cornelius Power, with Bishops Elden Curtiss and Alfredo Méndez-Gonzalez as co-consecrators,, at the Portland Civic Auditorium. In addition to his episcopal duties, Steiner served as pastor of St. Mary Parish in Corvallis, Oregon (until 2000), vicar for clergy and clergy personnel director (1978–1980), vicar for worship and ministry (1979–1981), and chairman of the Priests' Retirement Facility Committee (1986–1993).

Steiner served as archdiocesan administrator before the appointments of Archbishops Francis George (1996) and John Vlazny (1997). He served as pastor of St. John the Baptist Parish in Milwaukie, Oregon (2000–2002) before being named to St. Edward Parish in North Plains, Oregon. He also served as vicar for senior and infirm priests and a member of the Resource Development Office. As bishop, Steiner was a frequent visitor to death row inmates in Oregon prisons.

=== Retirement ===
Having reached his 75th birthday, the mandatory retirement age for bishops, Steiner sent his letter of resignation as auxiliary bishop of the Archdiocese of Portland in 2011 to Pope Benedict XVI. The pope accepted it on November 25, 2011.

== See also ==
- Catholic Church hierarchy
- Catholic Church in the United States
- Historical list of the Catholic bishops of the United States
- List of Catholic bishops of the United States
- Lists of patriarchs, archbishops, and bishops

== Episcopal succession ==
Catholic Church titles
Preceded by –	Auxiliary Bishop of Portland in Oregon; 1978–2011	Succeeded by –
