= Peter Leslie Smith =

American Catholic prelate (born 1958)

His Excellency, The Most Reverend Peter Leslie Smith
- Auxiliary Bishop of Portland in Oregon
- Archdiocese: Portland in Oregon
- Appointed: March 4, 2014
- Installed: April 29, 2014
- Other post: Titular Bishop of Tubunae in Mauretania

Orders
- Ordination: June 9, 2001 by John George Vlazny
- Consecration: April 29, 2014 by Alexander King Sample, John George Vlazny, and Liam Cary

Personal details
- Born: February 8, 1958 (age 68) Pietermaritzburg, South Africa
- Education: University of Natal; Mount Angel Seminary; Pontifical Atheneum of St. Anselm; The Catholic University of America
- Motto: Christus in vobis spes gloriae (Latin for 'Christ in you, hope for glory')
- Styles
- Reference style: His Excellency; The Most Reverend
- Spoken style: Your Excellency
- Religious style: Bishop

Peter Leslie Smith (born February 8, 1958) is a South African-born American Catholic prelate who serves as auxiliary bishop of the Archdiocese of Portland in Oregon.

== Biography ==
=== Early life ===
Peter Smith was born in Pietermaritzburg, South Africa, on February 8, 1958, and was educated in the local schools. He earned a bachelor's degree and a law degree from the University of Natal.

Smith immigrated to the United States in 1986. He received a Master of Divinity degree from Mount Angel Seminary in Saint Benedict, Oregon, and a Bachelor of Sacred Theology degree from Pontifical Atheneum of St. Anselm in Rome.

=== Priest ===
Smith was ordained a priest at St. Mary's Cathedral of the Immaculate Conception for the Archdiocese of Portland on June 9, 2001, by Archbishop John Vlazny. After his 2001 ordination, the archdiocese assigned Smith as parochial vicar at Our Lady of the Lake Parish in Lake Oswego, Oregon. He took a leave of absence from the archdiocese in 2004 to study at The Catholic University of America in Washington, D.C., where he received a Licentiate of Canon Law in 2006.

Returning to Portland in 2006, the archdiocese assigned Smith as pastor of St. Rose of Lima Parish in Portland. Smith also served as the adjutant judicial vicar from 2010 to 2014, then as vicar general and moderator of the curia for the archdiocese starting in 2013. He served as the archdiocesan liaison for the Catholic Charismatic Renewal, and he is a member of the Brotherhood of the People of Praise, a charismatic association of priests in the archdiocese.

=== Auxiliary Bishop of Portland ===
Pope Francis named Smith as the titular bishop of Tubunae in Mauretania and auxiliary bishop of Portland on March 4, 2014. He was ordained in St. Mary's Cathedral of the Immaculate Conception in Portland on April 29, 2014, by Archbishop Alexander Sample. Archbishop Emeritus John Vlazny and Bishop Liam Cary were the principal co-consecrators.
