= William Levada =

American Catholic cardinal (1936–2019)

His Eminence William Joseph Levada
- Prefect of the Congregation for the Doctrine of the Faith
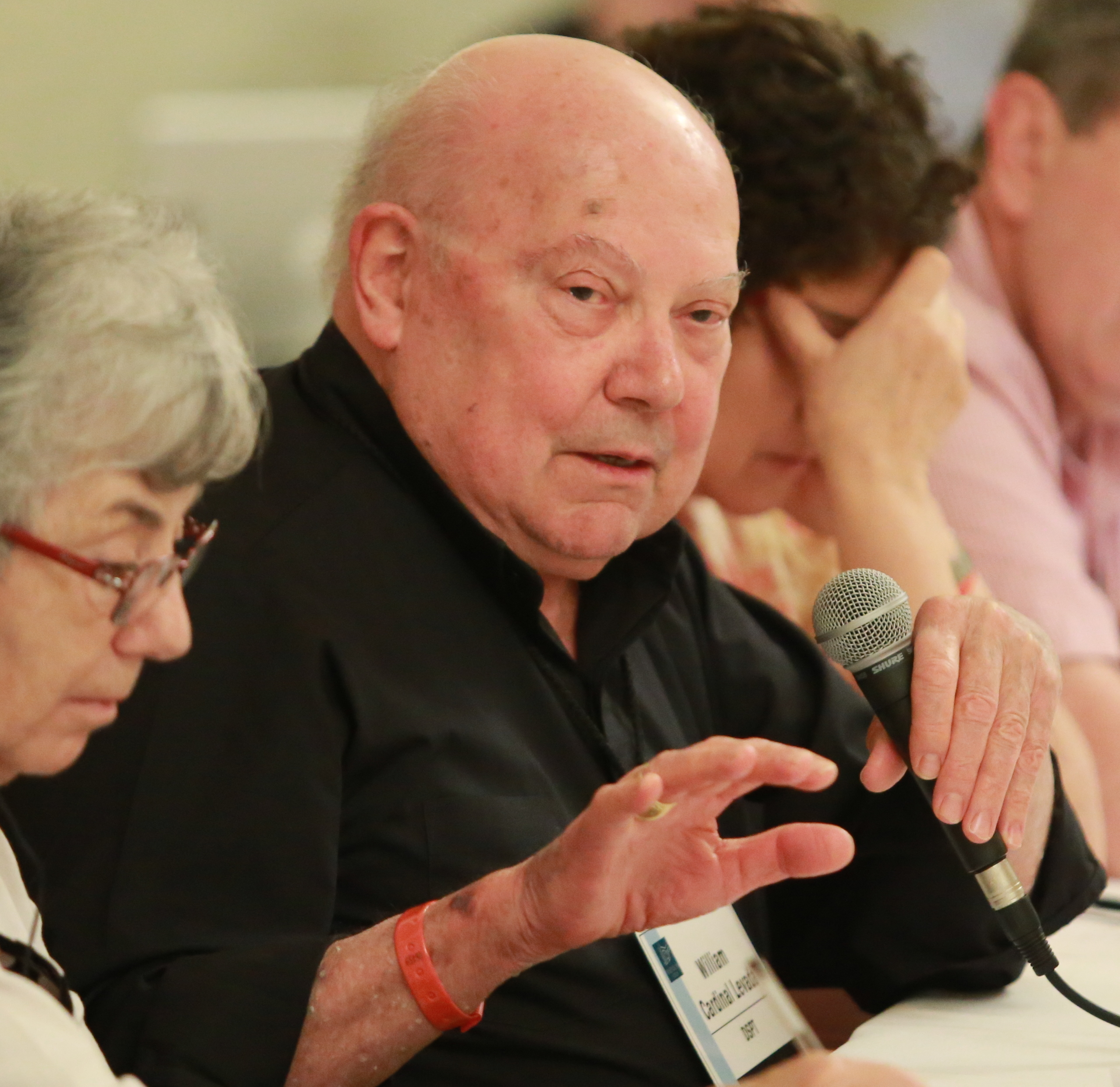
- Cardinal Levada in 2015
- Appointed: May 13, 2005
- Term ended: July 2, 2012
- Predecessor: Joseph Ratzinger
- Successor: Gerhard Ludwig Müller
- Other post: Cardinal Priest of Santa Maria in Domnica (2016–2019)
- Previous posts: Auxiliary Bishop of Los Angeles (1983–1986); Titular Bishop of Capri (1983–1986); Archbishop of Portland in Oregon (1986–1995); Coadjutor Archbishop of San Francisco (1995); Archbishop of San Francisco (1995–2005); Cardinal Deacon of Santa Maria in Domnica (2006–2016)

Orders
- Ordination: December 20, 1961 by Martin John O'Connor
- Consecration: May 12, 1983 by Timothy Manning
- Created cardinal: March 24, 2006 by Pope Benedict XVI
- Rank: Cardinal deacon (2006–2016); Cardinal priest (2016–2019)

Personal details
- Born: June 15, 1936 Long Beach, California, United States
- Died: September 26, 2019 (aged 83) Rome, Italy
- Denomination: Roman Catholic
- Parents: Joseph Levada; Lorraine Nunez
- Motto: Fratres in unum ('Brothers in unity', Psalm 133:1)

Styles of William Joseph Levada
- Reference style: His Eminence
- Spoken style: Your Eminence
- Religious style: Cardinal
- Informal style: Cardinal
- See: San Francisco (emeritus)

Ordination history of William Levada
History
Episcopal consecration
- Consecrated by: Timothy Card. Manning (LA)
- Date: May 23, 1983
Episcopal succession
Bishops consecrated by William Levada as principal consecrator
- Tod David Brown: April 3, 1989
- Alexander Joseph Brunett: July 6, 1994
- John Charles Wester: September 18, 1998
- Joseph A. Pepe: May 31, 2001
- Ignatius Chung Wang: January 30, 2003
- Clarence Richard Silva: July 21, 2005
- Joseph Augustine Di Noia OP: July 11, 2009

William Joseph Levada (June 15, 1936 – September 26, 2019) was an American Catholic prelate who served as prefect of the Congregation for the Doctrine of the Faith from 2005 to 2012. During that time, he was the highest-ranking American in the Roman Curia. He was previously the Archbishop of Portland in Oregon from 1986 to 1995 and Archbishop of San Francisco from 1995 to 2005. During his tenure, he was criticized for covering up sexual abuse by priests within his jurisdiction. He was created a cardinal in 2006 by Pope Benedict XVI.

== Early life and clerical formation ==
William Joseph Levada was born in Long Beach, California, to Joseph and Lorraine (née Nunez) Levada, both natives of Concord, California. His older sister, Dolores, died on May 21, 2007.

His great-grandparents came from Portugal and Ireland, and emigrated to the San Francisco Bay Area in the 1860s. He grew up in Long Beach and Houston, Texas, attended St. Anthony High School Long Beach and then St. John's Seminary in Camarillo, part of the Roman Catholic Archdiocese of Los Angeles. At St. Anthony High School, his classmate was George Hugh Niederauer, later his successor as archbishop of San Francisco.

From 1958 to 1961, Levada studied at the North American College and did his theological studies at the Pontifical Gregorian University in Rome. He was ordained to the priesthood on December 20, 1961, by Archbishop Martin John O'Connor, rector of the Pontifical North American College and president of the Pontifical Council for Social Communications, in St. Peter's Basilica.

== Priestly ministry ==
From 1961 until around 1966, Levada worked in parishes in the Archdiocese of Los Angeles, including St. Louis of France in La Puente and St. Monica in Santa Monica. He also taught high school and worked in college campus ministry.

After this, he returned to Rome and continued his studies at the North American College. He received a doctorate in sacred theology magna cum laude. His 1971 dissertation was written under Francis A. Sullivan, SJ, on "Infallible Church Magisterium and the Natural Moral Law". In the early 1970s, he taught theology at St. John's Seminary School of Theology in Camarillo, California. He was also named the first Director of Continuing Education for the Clergy in the archdiocese, and received the title Monsignor.

From 1976 to 1982, Levada was an official of the Congregation for the Doctrine of the Faith (CDF) in the Vatican, having been recommended by Cardinal Joseph Bernardin. He also taught part-time at the Pontifical Gregorian University. At the CDF, Levada served under three popes (Pope Paul VI, Pope John Paul I and Pope John Paul II), and under two prefects of the CDF (Cardinals Franjo Šeper and Joseph Ratzinger).

In 1982, Cardinal Timothy Manning, Archbishop of Los Angeles, named Levada as the executive director of the California Catholic Conference of Bishops which has its offices in Sacramento.

== Episcopal ministry ==
=== Auxiliary in Los Angeles ===
Levada was appointed an auxiliary bishop of Los Angeles and titular bishop of Capri on March 25, 1983, and was consecrated by Cardinal Manning (with Bishops John J. Ward and Juan Arzube as co-consecrators) in the Cathedral of St. Vibiana on May 12. In 1984, he was appointed episcopal vicar of Santa Barbara County. In 1986, he was appointed chancellor and moderator of the archdiocesan curia. Serving under Cardinal Roger Mahony, a classmate of Levada's at seminary, he reorganized the internal structure of the archdiocese.

=== Portland ===
Coat of arms as Archbishop of Portland in Oregon

On July 1, 1986, Levada became the Archbishop of Portland in Oregon. During his tenure in Portland, Levada helped to revitalize Mount Angel Seminary in St. Benedict, Oregon; Levada briefly taught at the seminary as well. Other work he undertook in Portland included reorganizing Catholic Charities, working in outreach to the Hispanic Catholic community, and renovating St. Mary's Cathedral of the Immaculate Conception. In 1987, he was appointed by Cardinal Joseph Ratzinger, whom Pope John Paul II asked to develop the project for a new Catechism of the Catholic Church, to serve on its editorial committee, one of seven bishops whose task it was to prepare a draft of the catechism, conduct a consultation among the bishops of the world and many scholars, and develop a final text under the direction of a commission of twelve cardinals of which Cardinal Ratzinger was president.

=== San Francisco ===
Coat of arms as Archbishop of San Francisco, before becoming a cardinal

On August 17, 1995, Levada was appointed coadjutor archbishop of San Francisco, and on December 27 of the same year he succeeded John Raphael Quinn as the archbishop.

When appointed archbishop of San Francisco in 1995, Levada was asked whether he expected to be created a cardinal at a news conference. "There is only one cardinal in California," he said at a time when Los Angeles, the largest diocese in the country, was still considered a cardinalatial see. "He is in Los Angeles. Being a cardinal is the consolation prize for not being the archbishop of San Francisco."

In November 2000, Levada was appointed one of the members of the Congregation for the Doctrine of the Faith, where he again served under Cardinal Ratzinger. This was a part-time task which allowed him to remain in California.

Also in 2000, Levada became the bishop co-chair of the Anglican-Roman Catholic dialogue in the United States. In November 2003, Levada was appointed as chairman of the United States Conference of Catholic Bishops Committee on Doctrine. This was a three-year term, but he resigned in 2005 due to his new duties in Rome and was replaced by Arthur J. Serratelli, Bishop of Paterson.

On September 18, 1998, he was principal consecrator at the episcopal ordination of Monsignor John C. Wester as an auxiliary bishop of San Francisco. On January 30, 2003, he was principal consecrator of Monsignor Ignatius C. Wang as an additional auxiliary bishop of San Francisco. Bishop Wang, a native of Beijing, is the first Chinese and first Asian bishop to be ordained for a diocese in the United States.

As Archbishop of San Francisco, Levada also served as grand prior of the Northwest Lieutenancy (USA) of the Equestrian Order of the Holy Sepulchre of Jerusalem, and as conventual chaplain for the Western Association (USA) of the Sovereign Military Hospitaller Order of St. John of Jerusalem of Rhodes and of Malta.

In 2013, Levada was a cardinal elector during the 2013 papal conclave.

== Involvement in U.S. clerical sexual abuse and coverup ==
Some have criticized how Levada dealt with priests who had committed sexual abuse in Portland and in San Francisco.

In 1985, as a contact of Boston's Cardinal Law about the issue, Levada was given a report by a three-man panel headed by Father Tom Doyle about medical, legal, and moral issues posed by abusive clerics in an attempt to present the report to the U.S. Conference of Catholic Bishops at their June 1985 meeting. A few days later Father Doyle was informed by Levada that their report would not be heard by the bishops. Weeks later, Doyle was demoted from his post in Vatican embassy.

In a 2008 interview Levada said: "I personally do not accept that there has been a broad base of bishops guilty of aiding and abetting pedophiles. If I thought there were, I would certainly want to talk to them about that."

As archbishop in Portland, Levada removed Father Joseph Baccellieri, a parish priest accused of child molestation, in 1992 but did not refer the matter to the police. In 1993, he learned of allegations that the priest had abused not one but three male victims. Levada authorized secret payments to the victims after they threatened to make the allegations public in a lawsuit. Levada allowed Baccellieri to return to duty in 1994 after he had undergone therapy and with the condition that he couldn't be around children and couldn't counsel adults or children. Levada did not inform parishioners or law enforcement about the allegations. Baccellieri went on to serve as a pastor or associate pastor in four Portland-area parishes between 1994 and 2001, when he went on leave to study canon law.

After spending $53 million to settle more than 100 claims of priestly sex abuse, Portland in 2004 became the first U.S. Roman Catholic archdiocese to declare bankruptcy.

In February 2013, Levada told the media that Cardinal Roger Mahony should be allowed to help select the next pope, even though Mahony had obstructed the investigation of child abusers while he headed the church in Los Angeles in the 1980s.

== Prefect of the Congregation for the Doctrine of the Faith ==
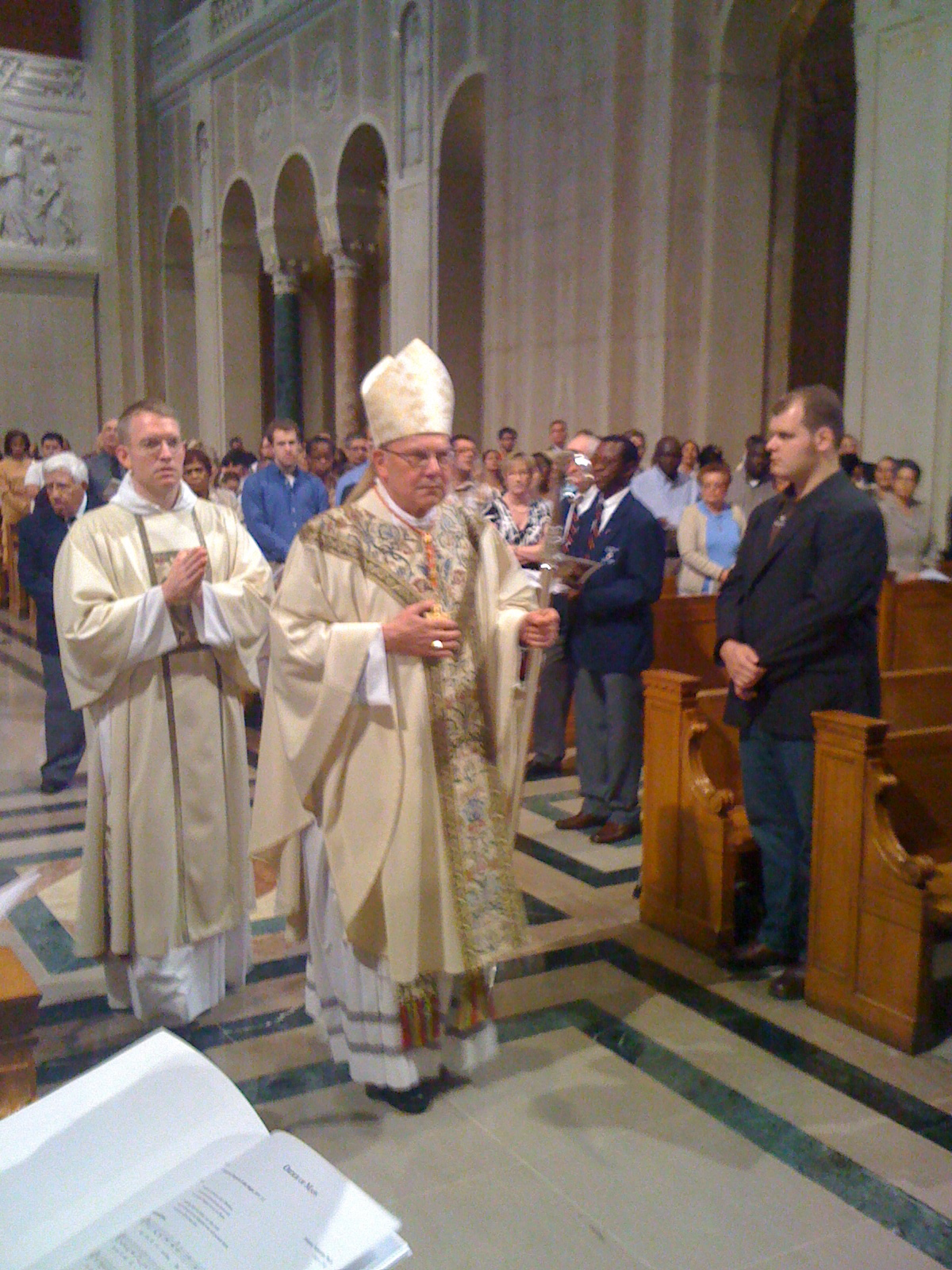
Levada in 2009, at the consecration of Joseph Augustine Di Noia

On May 13, 2005, Pope Benedict XVI appointed Levada as his own successor in the post of Prefect of the Congregation for the Doctrine of the Faith.

On March 24, 2006, Benedict XVI elevated Levada to the College of Cardinals. Levada was named cardinal deacon of Santa Maria in Domnica, which was later elevated to cardinal priest in 2016.

In addition to his position as prefect of the CDF, Cardinal Levada was ex officio the president of the Pontifical Biblical Commission, the International Theological Commission, and the Pontifical Commission Ecclesia Dei. He was also a member of the Congregation for Bishops, the Congregation for the Causes of Saints, the Congregation for the Evangelization of Peoples, the Congregation for the Oriental Churches, the Congregation for Catholic Education, the Pontifical Council for Legislative Texts, and the Pontifical Council for Promoting Christian Unity. On January 5, 2011, he was appointed among the first members of the newly created Pontifical Council for the Promotion of the New Evangelisation.

Pope Benedict accepted his resignation as prefect on July 2, 2012. He was succeeded that same day by Gerhard Ludwig Müller.

=== Head of the Pontifical Commission Ecclesia Dei ===
Cardinal Levada, who was already a member of the Pontifical Commission Ecclesia Dei, the organ of the Holy See charged with seeking the reconciliation of the Society of St. Pius X and similar groups with Rome and regulating celebration of the Sacraments according to the 1962 texts in Latin, was appointed its president on July 8, 2009, in accordance with Pope Benedict XVI's motu proprio Ecclesiae Unitatem, which makes the Prefect of the Congregation for the Doctrine of the Faith ex officio head of the Ecclesia Dei Commission. However, the commission has its own staff, consisting of a secretary and officials.

On May 13, 2011, the instruction Universae Ecclesiae was published, which clarified certain aspects of Summorum Pontificum. Cardinal Levada, as president of the Pontifical Commission Ecclesia Dei signed the document which was approved by Pope Benedict XVI on April 8 and is dated April 30, the memorial of Pope Pius V. The instruction also contains within it the fruits of the triennial examination of the application of the law, which had been planned from the outset.

=== Anglican ordinariate ===
On October 20, 2009, Cardinal Levada and Archbishop Joseph DiNoia held a press conference in which they announced that Pope Benedict was preparing to release an apostolic constitution that was later presented under the title Anglicanorum coetibus that would allow Anglicans, both laity and clergy, to join the Catholic Church and maintain their corporate identity. They stated that "pastoral oversight and guidance will be provided for groups of former Anglicans through a personal ordinariate, whose ordinary will usually be appointed from among former Anglican clergy."

The press release envisaged that married Anglican clergy who join the Catholic Church will be ordained to the priesthood, but excluded ordination to the episcopate: "Historical and ecumenical reasons preclude the ordination of married men as bishops in both the Catholic and Eastern Orthodox Churches. The Constitution therefore stipulates that the Ordinary can be either a priest or an unmarried bishop." During the conference, Cardinal Levada compared the new ordinariates to the ordinariate that in many countries exist for the pastoral care of the military forces. The move is to result in an Anglican liturgical rite within the Catholic Church. The personal ordinariates will be established after consultation with the episcopal conferences. It has not been indicated whether there is to be only one such personal ordinariate in a country, as for military ordinariates, or whether there could be a distinct ordinariate for each of several Anglican groups within a country who join the Catholic Church. A joint statement on the new protocol from Archbishop Vincent Nichols of Westminster and the Anglican Communion's head, and Rowan Williams the Archbishop of Canterbury, occurred at the same time in London.

On October 31, 2009, Cardinal Levada responded to speculation that the rule whereby in some Eastern Catholic Churches ordination to the diaconate and priesthood is open to married men as well as to celibates will apply also to the personal ordinariates for former Anglicans. He made it clear that the canonical discipline of the Western Catholic Church applies to these ordinariates. Objective criteria for circumstances in which a dispensation from celibacy may be requested will be worked out jointly by the personal ordinariate and the episcopal conference.

== Views ==
Cardinal Levada's views generally reflected the conservative wing of the Catholic Church.

=== Opposition to abortion ===
In March 1995, Pope John Paul II said that the Church's teachings against abortion and euthanasia were specific moral norms which the Church's ordinary and universal Magisterium had protected with infallibility. Two months later, Levada publicly reiterated this and singled out Catholic politicians who legislated to allow abortion: "The individual politician, like any Catholic, who is at odds with the teaching of the Church about the principle involved, i.e., that abortion constitutes the killing of innocent human life and is always gravely immoral has an obligation to reflect more deeply on the issue, in the hope of allowing the persuasive character of this infallibly taught teaching to become part of his belief and value system." In 2004 he wrote: "A Catholic, to be in full communion with the faith of the Church, must accept this teaching about the evil of abortion and euthanasia. This reflects the Church's official teaching on the matter."

=== Opposition to LGBT rights ===
In 1997, the City of San Francisco passed a law that all companies must provide the same benefits for domestic partners as for their spouses in attempt to extend rights to gay couples and common law heterosexual relationships. Levada objected that this violated Catholic teaching on the unique status of marriage, and circumvented the provisions by stating that unmarried employees of the archdiocese could designate any person sharing the same address as their beneficiary – which meant complying with the statute while in Levada's view avoiding a privileged status for unmarried domestic partnerships.

Levada led a march of approximately 1,000 people through the streets of San Francisco in April 2005 to protest against same sex marriage. He argued that only a marriage between a man and a woman can create the "bedrock of the family". Anything else "represents a misguided understanding of marriage".

In 2006, Levada stated that the Archdiocese of San Francisco should more carefully avoid allowing gay couples to adopt children locally. The San Francisco Board of Supervisors reacted with a unanimous resolution highlighting the discriminatory approach, stating that Levada was "a decidedly unqualified representative of his former home city, and of the people of San Francisco and the values they hold dear”.

=== Opposition to gender-inclusive language ===
Levada was one of six bishops given responsibility in 1987 for editing the text of an updated version of the Catechism of the Catholic Church. He opposed the draft of an English translation made available in 1993, objecting to its preference for gender-inclusive language. Levada's views prevailed and the version published in 1994 maintained the traditional gendered expressions of earlier catechisms. Levada also authored the glossary for the second edition of the catechism.

=== Dissident theologians ===
On Catholics who dissent from Catholic teachings Levada wrote that "Catholic theology does not recognize the right to dissent, if by that we mean adopting conclusions which are contrary to the clear teachings of the authoritative, infallible magisterium and which are presented to the public in such a way as to constitute equivalently an alternative personal magisterium".

=== Norms of moral law ===
In his doctoral dissertation of 1970 in which Levada treated the question of the infallibility of specific moral norms of the natural law, he wrote:

The human process of formulating moral norms is marked by an essential dependence upon the data of human experience. ...The variabilities which marked the human process of its discovery and formulation made such particular applications inherently unsuited to be considered for infallible definition. ...For such formulations must remain essentially open to modification and reformulation based upon moral values as they are perceived in relation to the data and the experience which mark man's understanding of himself. ...Even though there is nothing to prevent a council or a pope from extending [infallibility] to questions of the natural moral law from the point of view of their authority to do so, nevertheless the "prudential" certitude which characterizes the non-scriptural norms of the natural law argues against such an extension. ...The Church has never in fact made an infallible declaration about a particular norm of the natural moral law.

=== Liturgical music ===
While serving as Archbishop of Portland (Oregon) from 1986 to 1995, he was, ex officio, the chair of the board of directors for OCP (formerly known as Oregon Catholic Press).

=== Interfaith dialogue ===
Levada spoke in favor of interfaith dialogue.

According to rabbi David Rosen, Levada made it clear that there was intrinsic value in conducting interfaith dialogue with Jews even without any ulterior motives of proselytizing. He also made a clear distinction between "witnessing," or sharing the New Testament, and proselytizing, which he thought wrong.

In a 2002 address to the University of San Francisco, Levada said: "If both Islam and Christianity view themselves as universal and missionary, it does not mean an impasse but an opportunity to search further into the mystery of that faith to see how it resonates and relates to the other's faith."

=== Tridentine Mass ===
In 1999, some Traditionalist Catholics complained about Levada's refusal to grant the indult for Tridentine Masses to be celebrated publicly in his archdiocese; they said that this was against Pope John Paul II's motu proprio Ecclesia Dei.

== Retirement and death ==
Levada retired in July 2012. He lived in St Patrick seminary, Menlo Park, California.

On August 19, 2015, Levada was detained by police in Kailua-Kona, Hawaii, for drunk driving, after being observed driving under the influence. He was released after posting a $500 bond. After pleading no contest on January 25, 2016, he was ordered to pay a fine and fees totalling $462 and had his driving license revoked for one year. His blood alcohol level was 0.168%, more than twice the legal limit.

Levada died on September 26, 2019, in Rome.

Catholic Church titles
Preceded by Joseph Ratzinger (later Pope Benedict XVI)	Prefect of the Congregation for the Doctrine of the Faith; 2005–2012	Succeeded by Gerhard Ludwig Müller
Preceded by Darío Castrillón Hoyos	President of the Pontifical Commission Ecclesia Dei; 2009–2012	Succeeded by Gerhard Ludwig Müller
Preceded by John Raphael Quinn	Roman Catholic Archbishop of San Francisco; 1995–2005	Succeeded by George Hugh Niederauer
Preceded by Cornelius Michael Power	Roman Catholic Archbishop of Portland; 1986–1995	Succeeded by Francis George OMI
Preceded by –	Auxiliary Bishop of Los Angeles; 1983–1986	Succeeded by –
Preceded by Luigi Poggi	Cardinal-Deacon of Santa Maria in Domnica; 2006–2019	Succeeded by Marcello Semeraro
