= William Hickley Gross =

American prelate

His Excellency, The Most Reverend William Hickley Gross CSsR
- Archbishop of Oregon City
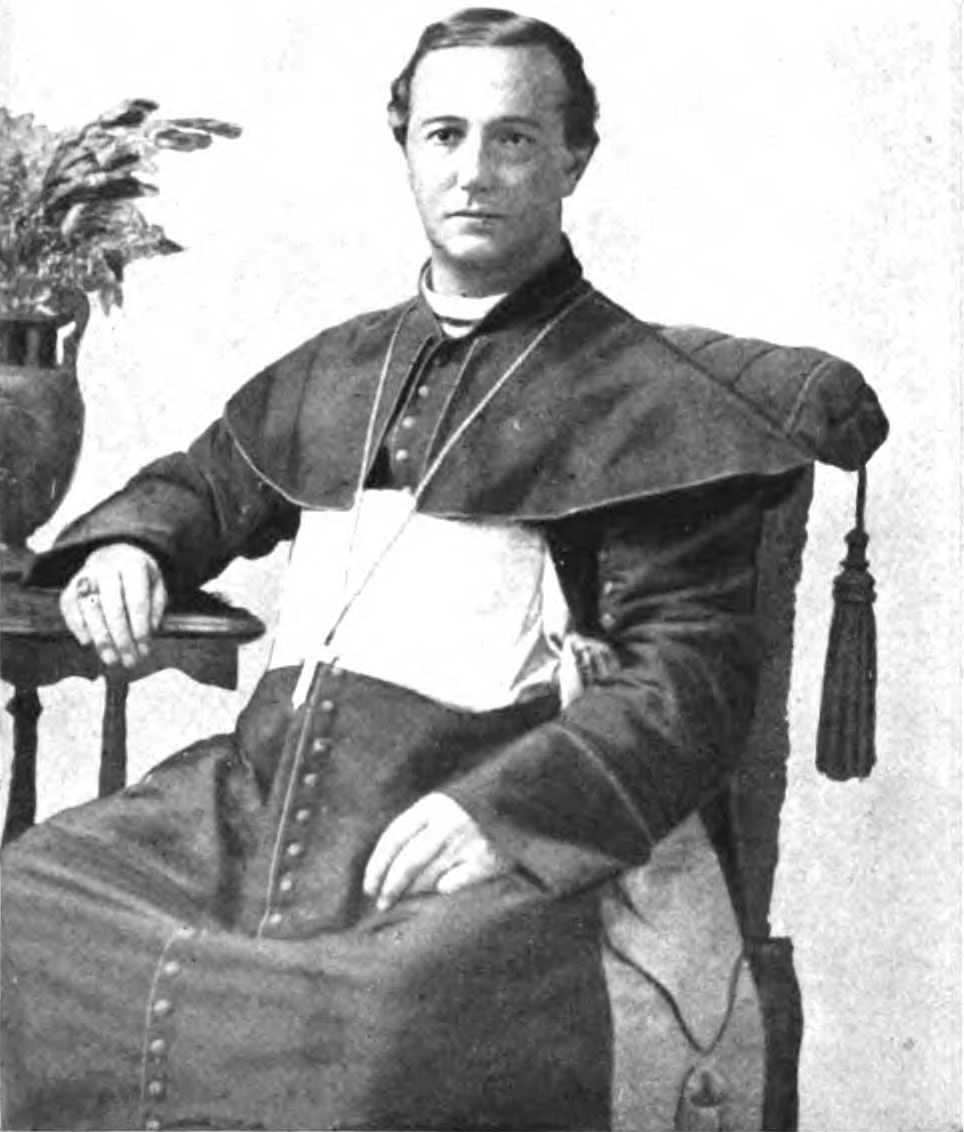
- See: Archdiocese of Oregon City
- Installed: March 31, 1885
- Term ended: November 14, 1898
- Predecessor: Charles John Seghers
- Successor: Alexander Christie
- Other post: Bishop of Savannah (1873–1885)

Orders
- Ordination: March 21, 1863 by Francis Kenrick
- Consecration: April 27, 1873 by James Roosevelt Bayley

Personal details
- Born: June 12, 1837 Baltimore, Maryland, US
- Died: November 14, 1898 (aged 61) Baltimore
- Denomination: Roman Catholic
- Education: St. Charles College
- Motto: Lumen aeternum mundo effudit Latin: "She gave forth to the world the everlasting light"

Styles of William Hickley Gross
- Reference style: His Excellency; The Right Reverend
- Spoken style: Your Excellency
- Religious style: Bishop

William Hickley Gross, C.Ss.R., (June 12, 1837 – November 14, 1898) was an American Catholic prelate and member of the Congregation of the Most Holy Redeemer (Redemptorists) who served as Bishop of Savannah (1873–1885) and Archbishop of Oregon City (1885–1898).

== Biography ==
=== Early life and education ===
William Gross was born on June 12, 1837, in Baltimore, Maryland, to Jacob and Rachel Haslett. His father was German and his mother was Irish; his paternal ancestors had immigrated to the United States from Alsace during the 19th century. Following his mother's death, William's sister took care of him and his five brothers.

William Gross enrolled at St. Charles College in Ellicott City, Maryland, at age 13. In 1853, he returned to work in his father's store after St. Charles decided that he was not suited for the priesthood.

In 1857, Gross entered the Redemptorist novitiate at Annapolis, Maryland. Following the outbreak in 1861 of the American Civil War, the Redemptorists received permission from the Vatican to advance Gross to holy orders sooner than permitted under church law so that he could avoid the military draft.

=== Priesthood ===
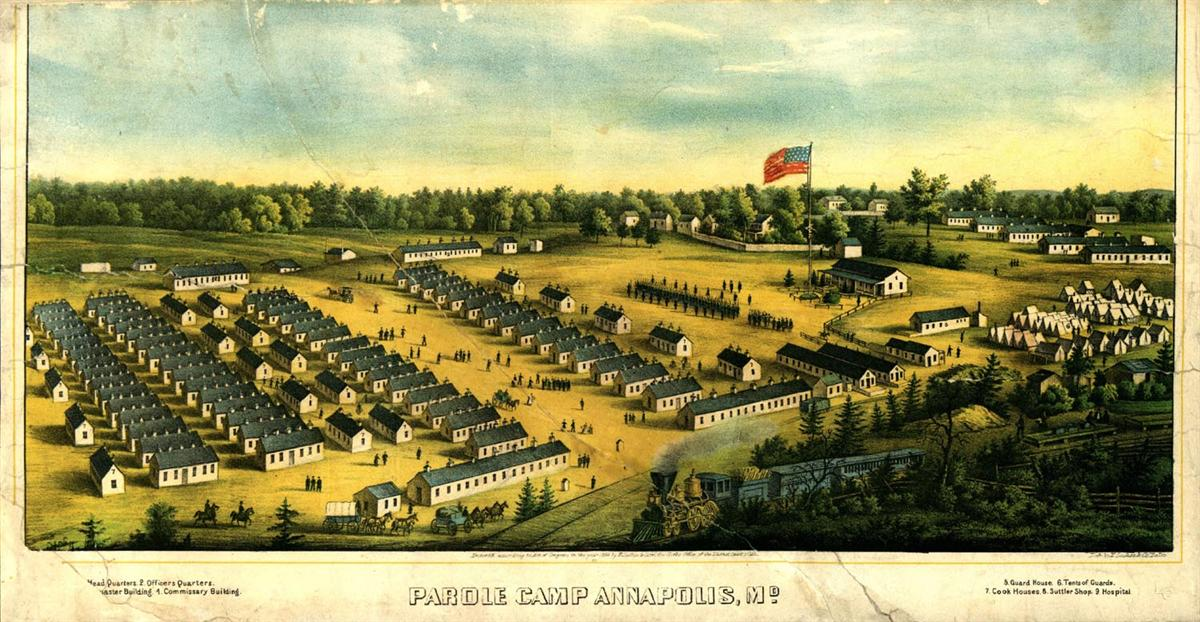
Union Army parole camp in Annapolis, Maryland, for Confederate prisoners of war (1864)

Gross was ordained into the priesthood in Annapolis for the Redemptorists by Archbishop Francis Kenrick on March 21, 1863. After six months of studies, the Redemptorists assigned Gross as chaplain to wounded Union Army soldiers at an hospital in Annapolis. He also operated a chapel at the parole camp in Annapolis for Confederate States Army prisoners of wars. Gross also worked with newly freed African-Americans.

After the war, from 1865 to 1872, Gross served in a Redemptorist mission band, which attended parochial missions throughout Maryland, New York, Florida, and Georgia. Gross spent three years in Baltimore recuperating from illness, then returned to Georgia. He later continued his missionary work in Baltimore and at St. Alphonsus Ligouri Parish in New York City. Gross then went to Boston, Massachusetts, where he served as superior of the Redemptorist community at Our Lady of Perpetual Help Mission.

=== Bishop of Savannah ===
Coat of arms as Bishop of Savannah

On February 14, 1873, Gross was appointed the fifth bishop of Savannah by Pope Pius IX. He received his episcopal consecration on April 27, 1873, at the Cathedral of the Assumption of the Blessed Virgin Mary in Baltimore from Archbishop James Bayley, with Bishops Thomas A. Becker and James Gibbons serving as co-consecrators. At age 36, Gross became the youngest member of the American hierarchy. He selected as his episcopal motto: "Lumen aeternum mundo effudit" (Latin: "She gave forth to the world the Everlasting Light").

During his tenure in Savannah, Gross laid the cornerstone for the Cathedral of Our Lady of Perpetual Help in 1873 and dedicated it in 1876. In addition to erecting several churches, schools, orphanages, and hospitals, he opened a men's college at Macon, Georgia, introduced the Jesuits and Benedictines to the diocese, and established a diocesan newspaper, The Southern Cross, in 1875.

=== Archbishop of Oregon City ===
Pope Leo XIII appointed Gross as the third archbishop of Oregon City on February 1, 1885. He was installed on March 31, 1885. During his tenure, Gross dedicated St. Mary's Cathedral of the Immaculate Conception in Portland, Oregon, in August 1885 acquired the Catholic Sentinel newspaper for the archdiocese, and founded the Sisters of St. Mary of Oregon order in 1886. Cardinal Gibbons invested him with the pallium in October 1887.

Gross opened Mount Angel College in Saint Benedict, Oregon, in 1887, a minor seminary in 1889, and a senior citizens home in 1896; and presided over the Third Provincial Council of Oregon in 1891.

=== Death ===
After falling ill while giving a retreat for Redemptorist students in Annapolis, William Gross died on November 14, 1898, at St. Joseph's Hospital in Baltimore, at age 61. His eloquence had led him to become known as "the silver tongued orator of the hierarchy."

== See also ==
- Catholic Church hierarchy
- Catholic Church in the United States
- Historical list of the Catholic bishops of the United States
- List of Catholic bishops of the United States
- Lists of patriarchs, archbishops, and bishops

Catholic Church titles
Preceded by Ignatius Persico, O.F.M. Cap.	Bishop of Savannah; 1873–1885	Succeeded by Thomas Albert Andrew Becker
Preceded by Charles John Seghers	Archbishop of Oregon City; 1885–1898	Succeeded by Alexander Christie
