= Thomas Albert Andrew Becker =

American Catholic bishop (1832–1899)

The Right Reverend Thomas Albert Andrew Becker
- Bishop of Savannah
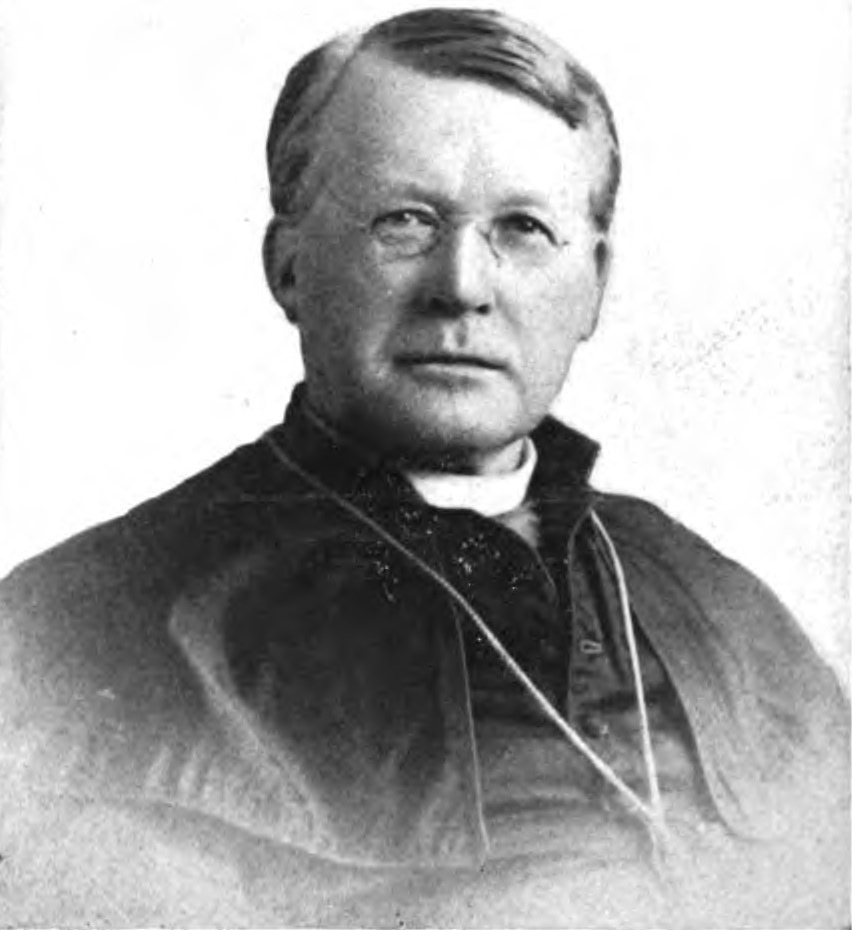
- Church: Catholic Church
- Diocese: Savannah
- Appointed: March 26, 1886
- Term ended: July 29, 1899
- Predecessor: William Hickley Gross
- Successor: Benjamin Joseph Keiley
- Previous post: Bishop of Wilmington (1868–1886)

Orders
- Ordination: June 18, 1859 by Costantino Patrizi Naro
- Consecration: August 16, 1868 by Martin John Spalding

Personal details
- Born: Thomas Baker; December 30, 1832 Pittsburgh, Pennsylvania, U.S.
- Died: July 29, 1899 (aged 66) Washington, Georgia, U.S.
- Motto: Ora pro nobis (Latin for 'Pray for us')
- Coat of arms

Thomas Albert Andrew Becker (né Baker; December 30, 1832 – July 29, 1899) was an American prelate of the Catholic Church. He served as the first Bishop of Wilmington (1868–1886) and the sixth Bishop of Savannah (1886–1899).

== Early life and education ==
Becker was born Thomas Baker on December 30, 1832, in Pittsburgh, Pennsylvania. He was the second of five children of John and Susan (née Walker) Baker. His parents were natives of County Down, Ireland, who had immigrated to the United States in 1831 and settled in Pittsburgh, where his father operated a hardware store. In 1842, the family moved to a farm in Findley Township in Mercer County.

Becker received his early education at the Albin School, a one-room schoolhouse near his family's home in Mercer County. He later attended the Western University of Pennsylvania (now the University of Pittsburgh) until 1849, when a fire destroyed the university's building. He then briefly attended the newly established Allegheny Institute (now Avery College). In 1850, he enrolled at St. Xavier College in Cincinnati, Ohio, where his older brother Samuel was a student. A year later, however, he left Cincinnati and accepted a teaching position at Martinsburg Academy in Martinsburg (then part of Virginia). At the academy, one of his pupils was John Joseph Kain.

=== Conversion and name change ===
Becker was raised as a Presbyterian. In 1846, while a student at St. Xavier College in Cincinnati, his brother Samuel converted to Catholicism. Thomas later converted as well, receiving a conditional baptism on May 22, 1853, from Father Andrew Talty in Winchester. He was confirmed by Bishop John McGill on November 6, 1853.

At a Requiem Mass for Becker in 1899, Bishop John Samuel Foley recounted the story behind Becker's conversion:

[Becker] stated that while the boys were one day playing in the school yard of the village school, a Catholic boy among them lost his catechism. The future bishop found it and read the simple exposition of Catholic faith contained therein.

According to one of Becker's nephews, Samuel and Thomas's conversion led their father to disown them and demand them to change their last name. Both Samuel and Thomas adopted the Germanized name Becker at their Catholic baptism.

== Priesthood ==
In 1855, two years after his conversion, Becker was sent to study for the priesthood at the Pontifical Urban College for the Propagation of the Faith in Rome. During his time there, he once delivered an address to Pope Pius IX in Gaelic. Becker was ordained a priest on June 18, 1859, by the Cardinal Vicar, Costantino Patrizi Naro, at the Lateran Basilica. Later that summer, he received the degree of Doctor of Divinity from the Urban College.

Upon his return to the United States in 1859, Becker served as an assistant at St. Peter's Cathedral in Richmond. In 1860, he was appointed pastor of St. Joseph's Church in Martinsburg, where he succeeded Father Talty (who had baptized him). He oversaw the completion of the church, which was dedicated by Bishop McGill in September 1860.

=== Civil War ===
During the Civil War, Becker was a strong supporter of the Confederate States of America. He reportedly passed military intelligence to General Stonewall Jackson and helped Colonel John S. Mosby evade capture by Union soldiers. The basement of Becker's church in Martinsburg was used as a stable by Union soldiers, while the sacristy was used to hold prisoners of war. Meanwhile, one of Becker's brothers, Joseph D. Baker, served in the 57th Pennsylvania Infantry Regiment, was taken prisoner at the Battle of Gettysburg, and died at the Andersonville Prison.

On March 9, 1863, Becker was arrested by Union forces after refusing an order to publicly pray for the U.S. government at Mass. Archbishop Francis Kenrick of Baltimore wrote to President Abraham Lincoln on Becker's behalf on March 13, explaining that only a bishop was authorized to make changes to the Catholic liturgy. Secretary of War Edwin Stanton then ordered Becker to be released from custody, but General Benjamin S. Roberts objected, insisting that his arrest had been "eminently proper." After Archbishop Kenrick again interceded for Becker, General Robert C. Schenck wrote to Secretary Stanton on April 10:

I have examined Mr. Becker in person. Find him a thorough secessionist who prayed in his church for Jeff. Davis and the Confederacy but will not pray for the President and authorities of the United States... I think he should be sent through the lines.

Upon Schenck's recommendation, Becker was brought to Baltimore and placed in the personal custody of Archbishop Kenrick. Becker was then appointed an assistant at St. Peter the Apostle Church in Baltimore, where he remained until Kenrick's death in July 1863. He then joined the faculty of Mount St. Mary's College in Emmitsburg, where he served as professor of dogmatic theology, Scripture, and Church history for a year. From 1864 to 1865, he served as secretary to Kenrick's successor, Archbishop Martin John Spalding.

Following the end of the war in 1865, Becker returned to Richmond and served as rector of St. Peter's Cathedral until becoming a bishop in 1868. At the Second Plenary Council of Baltimore in 1866, he served as a peritus to Bishop McGill and as one of the three official secretaries of the council.

== Bishop of Wilmington ==
At the Second Plenary Council of Baltimore, the Catholic bishops of the United States proposed the creation of the Diocese of Wilmington to cover the Delmarva Peninsula—including the entire state of Delaware, nine counties on the Eastern Shore of Maryland, and two counties on the Eastern Shore of Virginia. The bishops submitted to the Holy See a terna, or list of three candidates, to serve as its first bishop; in order, they ranked: Father Patrick Reilly of Wilmington, Father Edward Brennan of Baltimore, and Becker. The Vatican's decision was delayed for two years due to a debate over whether Wilmington would be a suffragan diocese of the Archdiocese of Baltimore or the Archdiocese of Philadelphia. On March 3, 1868, Pope Pius IX established the new diocese as a suffragan of Baltimore and named Becker as its bishop.

Becker received his episcopal consecration on August 16, 1868, from Archbishop Spalding at the Baltimore Cathedral, with Bishops McGill and Richard Vincent Whelan (who had also served as pastor of Martinsburg) serving as co-consecrators. James Gibbons, the newly appointed Vicar Apostolic of North Carolina and a future cardinal, was consecrated at the same ceremony.

At the beginning of Becker's tenure in 1868, the Diocese of Wilmington contained eight priests and 14 churches to serve 5,000 Catholics. By the end of his tenure in 1886, the diocese contained 22 priests, 26 churches, and 15,000 Catholics. In 1879, he opened a protectory for boys at Delaware City under the care of the Sisters of St. Francis of Philadelphia. In order to attend to the needs of his new diocese, he was excused from attending the First Vatican Council (1869–1870).

Becker faced many difficulties as Bishop of Wilmington, including lack of financial resources and priestly vocations. In 1877, he wrote to Cardinal Alessandro Franchi, prefect of the Congregation for the Propagation of the Faith, expressing his frustration that he had "found foundations of hardly anything" on the "needy and sterile peninsula." In 1879, he submitted his resignation as bishop to the Holy See. Franchi's successor, Cardinal Giovanni Simeoni, sought the opinion of Becker's metropolitan, Archbishop James Gibbons of Baltimore, who replied that Becker would be happier if he were transferred to a diocese where there was more work. Nevertheless, Becker remained at Wilmington for the next seven years.

== Bishop of Savannah ==
In March 1885, the Diocese of Savannah, which then comprised the entire state of Georgia, became vacant when Bishop William Hickley Gross was appointed Archbishop of Oregon City. At a meeting of the bishops of the Archdiocese of Baltimore the following May, Becker asked to be transferred to Savannah and his fellow bishops agreed to support his request in a letter to the Holy See. On March 26, 1886, Becker was named the sixth Bishop of Savannah by Pope Leo XIII.

In 1887, Becker restored the Cathedral of Our Lady of Perpetual Help to its original name as the Cathedral of St. John the Baptist. He built a new episcopal residence in 1889, and added two spires to the cathedral in 1896. However, in February 1898, a fire destroyed the cathedral. He immediately began work to rebuild it but did not live to see it completed.

As Bishop of Savannah, Becker was involved in a widely publicized feud with the secular clergy of the diocese. In 1887, he sold Pio Nono College, a diocesan seminary in Macon, due to the college's low enrollment and significant debt. He sold the college to the Jesuits, who converted it into a novitiate for their order. Ten years later, Becker placed Sts. Peter and Paul Church in Atlanta and St. Francis Xavier Church in Brunswick under the care of the Marists. Citing his actions toward the Jesuits and Marists, the secular clergy openly rebelled against Becker in 1897.

In a Savannah Morning News article titled "Bolt Against the Bishop," the diocesan priests accused Becker of hurting their vocations and means of support. The priests informed Archbishop Sebastiano Martinelli, the Apostolic Delegate to the United States, that Becker had not ordained a single diocesan priest since becoming Bishop of Savannah and that the number of priests had actually declined from 21 to 11 since 1886. In writing to Martinelli, Cardinal Gibbons said, "I am of the opinion that [Becker's] resignation would be the best remedy for existing difficulties." However, Becker remained as bishop until his death two years later.

=== Death ===
In May 1899, Becker went to Washington, Georgia, where a fire had destroyed St. Joseph's Orphanage, and remained there to supervise the restoration. While there, he suffered a seizure on July 28, 1899, and died the following day at the age of 66.

His Requiem Mass was celebrated by Bishop Henry P. Northrop at St. Patrick's Church in Savannah, with Bishop Augustine Van de Vyver delivering the eulogy.

== Racial views ==
Becker had a generally low opinion of African Americans but was very interested in serving their spiritual needs. In 1866, while a priest in Richmond, he wrote:

There will be some good coming from the treasured freedom that is now granted to the poor Negroes, but also in the case that these freedmen, who rarely are Catholic, have their own priests (that is for themselves only) and have churches and schools—in other words, that they be treated as human beings. This is what must be done for the purpose of saving them, and in order to avoid that the Protestants arrange things in such a way that freedom for them may be the saddest gift ever granted by heaven to a race of illiterates.

In 1891, as Bishop of Savannah, Becker expressed his belief that African Americans "are very prone to vice and when fallen are almost incapable of being raised up." The following year, however, he recognized "the injustice done [to] the tax-paying negroes of by-gone years in forcing them to pay for the support of schools, to which they could not send their children..."

Becker was responsible for the introduction of racial segregation policies into the Diocese of Savannah. One incident involved his segregation of St. Benedict the Moor Parish in Savannah, which had been an interracial congregation. Becker personally separated the parish with an unannounced visit to the church in the middle of a Sunday Mass. He reportedly declared to the congregation: "You white people associating and mixing with the niggers will soon become worse than the niggers."

Becker unsuccessfully attempted to get Fr John R. Slattery to send the Josephites to minister to Black Catholics in Georgia, but did manage to convince Archabbot Boniface Wimmer to send Benedictines for the same purpose. He also supported the work of Mother Mathilda Beasley, the first Black nun in Georgia, and worked with her to build a new orphanage for Black girls in 1896.

== See also ==
- Catholic Church hierarchy
- Catholic Church in the United States
- Historical list of the Catholic bishops of the United States
- List of Catholic bishops of the United States
- Lists of patriarchs, archbishops, and bishops

== Sources ==
- Peterman, Thomas Joseph (1982). The Cutting Edge: The Life of Thomas Andrew Becker. Wm. T. Cooke Publishing, Inc.

== Episcopal succession ==
Catholic Church titles
Preceded by None	Bishop of Wilmington; 1868–1886	Succeeded by Alfred Allen Paul Curtis
Preceded by William Hickley Gross	Bishop of Savannah; 1886–1899	Succeeded by Benjamin Joseph Keiley
