= Thomas Meienhofer =

First abbot of Mount Angel Abbey in Oregon, USA

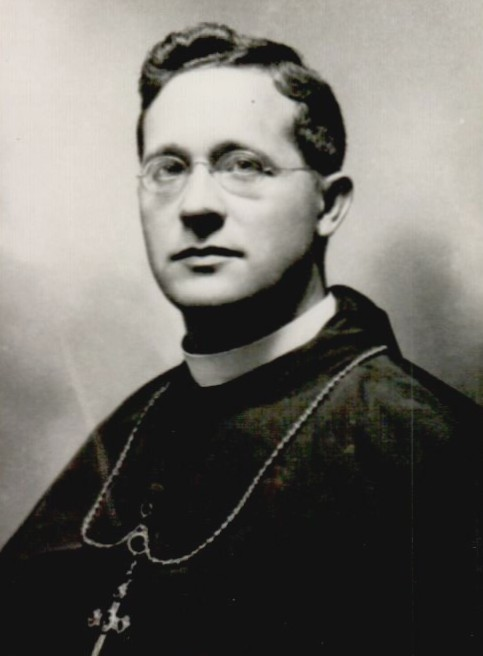
- Meienhofer in the year he became abbot (1904)
- Born: Thomas Aquinas Meienhofer; September 18, 1865; Wuppenau, Thurgau, Switzerland
- Died: September 6, 1936 (aged 70); Virginia, United States
- Education: Engelberg Abbey
- Spouse: Belle Gerlinger

Thomas Meienhofer (September 18, 1865 – September 6, 1936) was the first abbot of Mount Angel Abbey in Oregon, USA,

== Education in Switzerland ==
Thomas Aquinas Meienhofer, baptized as Francis Thomas Meienhofer von Ardyn, was born in Wuppenau in the canton of Thurgau. He attended the school at Engelberg Abbey, entered the abbey and became a priest. After moving to the daughter monastery Mount Angel in the US, he taught Latin, biology and astronomy at the college.

== Leadership in the young monastery ==
On July 11, 1901, he was elected prior of Mount Angel and on February 3, 1904, after the priory was elevated to an abbey, he was elected the first abbot. Both elections took place under the presidency of Abbot Frowin Conrad of Conception Abbey. Abbot Meienhofer received the abbatial benediction on June 29, 1904, through Abbot Frowin Conrad (Archbishop Christie of Portland was ill). His assistants were Abbots Athanasius Schmitt of St. Meinrad's Abbey, Indiana, and Vincent Wehrle of St. Mary's Abbey, North Dakota.

Abbot Meienhofer served as abbot 1904–1910. He resigned unexpectedly on May 25, 1910. He had been absent from the monastery for many months and had been seen in the company of Belle Gerlinger, the divorced daughter of the railroad magnate Louis Gerlinger. He married Belle on Saturday, July 23, 1910 in Weber, Utah. Meienhofer was blind in his right eye . He never returned to Mount Angel, although he corresponded with some of the monks, and died in Faurquier County, Virginia at the country home of Mr. and Mrs. R. Randolph Hicks, where he was a weekend guest with his wife4.
