= Edward Howard (bishop) =

American prelate

His Excellency, The Most Reverend Edward Daniel Howard
- Archbishop of Portland; Titular Archbishop of Albulae
- See: Portland
- Installed: August 26, 1926
- Term ended: December 9, 1966
- Predecessor: Alexander Christie
- Successor: Robert Joseph Dwyer
- Previous post: Auxiliary Bishop of Davenport (1924–1926)

Orders
- Ordination: June 12, 1906 by John Ireland
- Consecration: April 8, 1924 by Austin Dowling

Personal details
- Born: November 5, 1877 Cresco, Iowa, US
- Died: January 2, 1983 (aged 105) Beaverton, Oregon, US
- Denomination: Roman Catholic Church
- Coat of arms

Edward Daniel Howard (November 5, 1877 – January 2, 1983) was an American prelate of the Roman Catholic Church. He served as the auxiliary bishop of Davenport in Iowa from 1924 to 1926 and the archbishop of Portland in Oregon from 1926 to 1966. At the time of his death in 1983 he was the oldest Catholic bishop in the world.

== Early life and education ==
Edward Howard was born on November 5, 1877, in Cresco, Iowa, to John and Marie (née Fleming) Howard. His father, who was born in Ireland but immigrated to the United States as a child, served during the American Civil War with the 95th Illinois Volunteer Infantry Regiment and was wounded at the 1863 Siege of Vicksburg in Mississippi. Howard had a twin brother who died in infancy. Edward Howard attended St. Joseph College in Dubuque, where he received his high school education and completed two years of college. He continued his studies at St. Mary College in Kansas and at St. Paul Seminary in Minnesota.

== Priesthood ==
Howard was ordained to the priesthood by Archbishop John Ireland on June 12, 1906. He then returned to St. Joseph College, where he served as professor of Greek and Latin at the high school department. He served as principal of the high school from 1908 until 1916, when he became dean of the college. From 1921 to 1924, he served as president of St. Joseph's.

== Auxiliary Bishop of Davenport ==
On December 23, 1923, Howard was appointed auxiliary bishop of Davenport and titular bishop of Isaura by Pope Pius XI. He received his episcopal consecration on April 8, 1924, from Archbishop Austin Dowling, with Bishops Daniel Gorman and Thomas Drumm serving as co-consecrators, at St. Raphael's Cathedral in Dubuque. As an auxiliary bishop, he assisted Bishop James J. Davis for two years.

=== Archbishop of Oregon City and Portland in Oregon ===
Following the death of Archbishop Alexander Christie, Howard was appointed by Pope Pius XI as the fifth archbishop of Oregon City on April 30, 1926. His installation took place at St. Mary's Cathedral in Portland on August 26 of that year. On September 26, 1928, the name of the archdiocese was changed from Oregon City to Portland in Oregon. During his tenure as archbishop, Howard created a chancery in the cathedral rectory, later transferring it to a separate building. He reorganized the St. Vincent de Paul and Holy Name Societies, fostered the growth of Catholic Charities, and removed the Catholic Sentinel from private ownership.

In 1931, Howard led a successful campaign to repeal local zoning ordinances that prohibited the building of churches and parochial schools. He convened the Fourth Provincial Council of the archdiocese in 1932, and held a synod for the clergy in 1935. In 1939, he founded Central Catholic High School in Portland and was named an assistant at the pontifical throne by Pope Pius XII in 1939. Howard convened the Fifth Provincial Council of the archdiocese in 1957, and attended all four sessions of the Second Vatican Council in Rome between 1962 and 1965.

== Later life and death ==
After forty years as archbishop, Howard retired on December 9, 1966; he was appointed titular archbishop of Albulae by Pope Paul VI on the same date. He served as apostolic administrator of the archdiocese until the installation of his successor, Robert Joseph Dwyer.

Howard spent his retirement at Maryville Nursing Home in Beaverton, on the campus of the Sisters of St. Mary of Oregon, where he died at age 105. He is interred at Mount Calvary Cemetery. At the time of his death, he was the oldest Catholic prelate in the world.

== Notes ==
Catholic Church titles
Preceded by none	Archbishop of Portland in Oregon; 1928–1966	Succeeded by Robert Joseph Dwyer
Preceded by Alexander Christie	Archbishop of Oregon City; 1926–1928	Succeeded by none
Preceded by –	Auxiliary Bishop of Davenport; 1924–1926	Succeeded by –
