= Protectory =

A protectory was a Catholic institution for the shelter and training of the young, designed to afford neglected or abandoned children shelter, food, raiment and the rudiments of an education in religion, morals, science and manual training or industrial pursuits. Institutions of this nature were once found in most of the dioceses of the United States. They were usually opened to receive orphans, truants, juvenile delinquents, and destitute children. The largest, by far, was the Catholic Protectory in New York.

== Background ==
Secular protectories or reform schools, or euphemistically termed "training schools", were instituted in America during the initial quarter of the nineteenth century. On 1 January 1825, the House of Refuge was opened with appropriate exercises on what is now Madison Square, New York City. Nine children, just gathered from the streets, were present and formed the nucleus of the new establishment that later grew to vast proportions on Randalls Island. Boston followed with a similar institution in 1826; Philadelphia in 1828; and in 1855 a girls' reformatory was founded at Lancaster, Massachusetts on the family or cottage plan, dividing the institution into three separate houses of thirty girls each, with their three matrons, all under the general supervision of a superintendent. In the great majority of cases the institutions were public, but in several states the reformation and correction of delinquents was entrusted in whole or in part to private or religious agencies.

== History ==
San Michéle, the first protectory for youth, was founded at Rome in 1704 by Pope Clement XI. When John Howard, the English prison reformer (1726–90), visited the institution, he read above the entrance this inscription: "Clement XI, Supreme Pontiff, for the reformation and education of criminal youths, to the end that those who when idle had been injurious to the State, might, when better instructed and trained, become useful to it. In the Year of Grace 1704; of the Pontiff, the fourth". On a marble slab inserted in one of the interior walls he read further: "It is of little use to restrain criminals by punishment, unless you reform them by education". This became the keynote of modern penology. The inmates worked together by day in a large hall where was hung up in large letters, visible to all, the Latin word silentium, indicating that the work must go on in silence. At night they slept in separate cells. This system of associated or congregate labour in silence by day and cellular separation at night, for which, under the name of the Auburn System, so much excellence has been claimed in American penology, was thus inaugurated at Rome in the beginning of the eighteenth century, more than a hundred years prior to the introduction of the method into use here. The same pontiff established in connexion with this foundation of San Michéle a special court for the trial of offenders under twenty years of age, a plan that has re-appeared in the Juvenile Courts established in America and elsewhere for the trial of delinquents under (seventeen years of) age.

== Examples ==
=== New York Catholic Protectory ===
New York Catholic Protectory

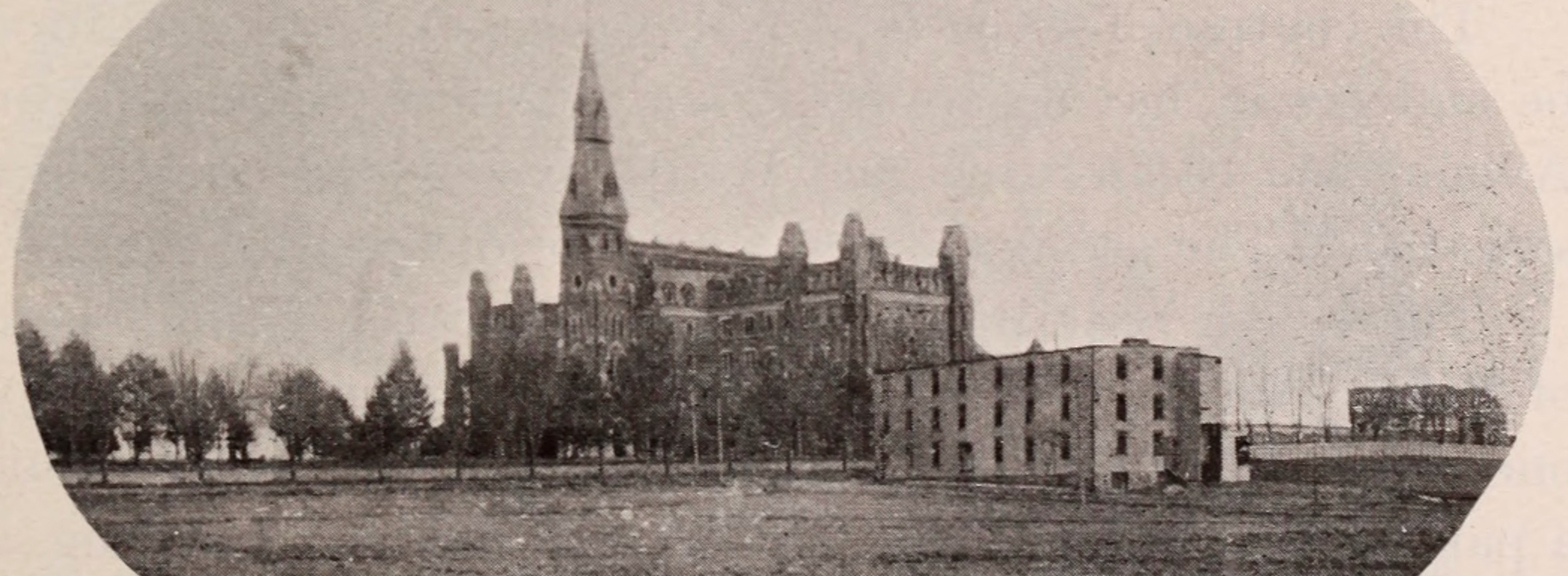
New York Catholic Protectory, Bronx, New York (circa. 1897)

The New York Catholic Protectory was, at one time, the largest child welfare organization in the country. By the mid 1860s, many children in New York City were the offspring of immigrants living in squalid and disease-ridden neighborhoods. Adding to the destitution was that casualties of the Civil War left many women widows and their children fatherless. "The Society for the Protection of Destitute Roman Catholic Children in the City of New York" was chartered in 1863.

=== St. Philip's Home ===
St. Philip's Home was opened in 1902 at 417 Broome Street in Manhattan as transitional housing for boys who had "aged out" of the Protectory home. The Protectory's main office was at 415 Broome Street. It was run by the Christian Brothers and could accommodate about 100 young men. There former students were assisted with job placement and housing for those who were unemployed or homeless. Some would visit on weekends to use the library or recreational facilities. According to the 1910 Report of Benevolent Institutions, young African-American men numbered among the 100 residents.

=== Lincolndale Agricultural School ===
At the Lincoln Agricultural School, a subsidiary institution, the boys also receive a training in dairy-farming and other agriculture.

In 1938, due to high overhead and declining residents with other resources and options available, the Girls' Department was closed and the Boys' relocated to the Lincolndale facility. The 129-acre main campus was sold to Metropolitan Life Insurance Company, which constructed the Parkchester planned-housing development on the site.

=== Other protectories ===
- St. James' Protectory in Reybold, Delaware was established by Bishop Thomas Albert Andrew Becker of Wilmington in September 1879 as an orphanage for boys. It was run by the Sisters of St. Francis of Philadelphia.
- St. Paul’s Home for Working Boys was founded in 1887 by Patrick Feehan, Archbishop of Chicago for the care of working boys, newsboys, and waifs. Temporary quarters were found first above a Catholic library on LaSalle Street, near the Board of Trade.

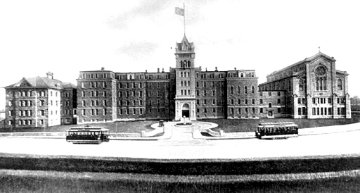
View of St. Mary's Industrial School for Boys c. early 1900s

- St. Mary's Industrial School for Boys was opened in Baltimore City in 1866 by the Archdiocese of Baltimore. The school served as both an orphanage and boarding school for boys, teaching them life and labor skills. At the time, Archbishop Martin Spalding pointed out the need for such a school, and enlisted the aid of the Xaverian Brothers to assist in running the school for the Archdiocese. As attendance at the school grew, the large original granite Victorian building was constructed and in use by 1868. Babe Ruth was a resident for a number of years and would later return to visit the boys, both here and at the New York Protectory.

Similar institutions were: in the United States, at Arlington, New Jersey (Diocese of Newark); Philadelphia, Pennsylvania; and Utica, New York (Diocese of Syracuse). In Canada, 4 in the Archdiocese of Montreal. In England: for boys, at Walthamstow, Essex; Farnworth, Lancashire; Birkdale, Lancashire and Market Weighton, Yorkshire and for girls, at Bristol, Gloucestershire and Liverpool, Lancashire. In Scotland, at Parkhead, Glasgow. In Ireland: for boys, at Glencree, Co. Wicklow, and Philipstown, King's Co.; for girls, at Drumcondra, Co. Dublin.
