= Central Catholic High School (Portland, Oregon) =

Private school in Portland, Oregon, United States

Central Catholic High School.
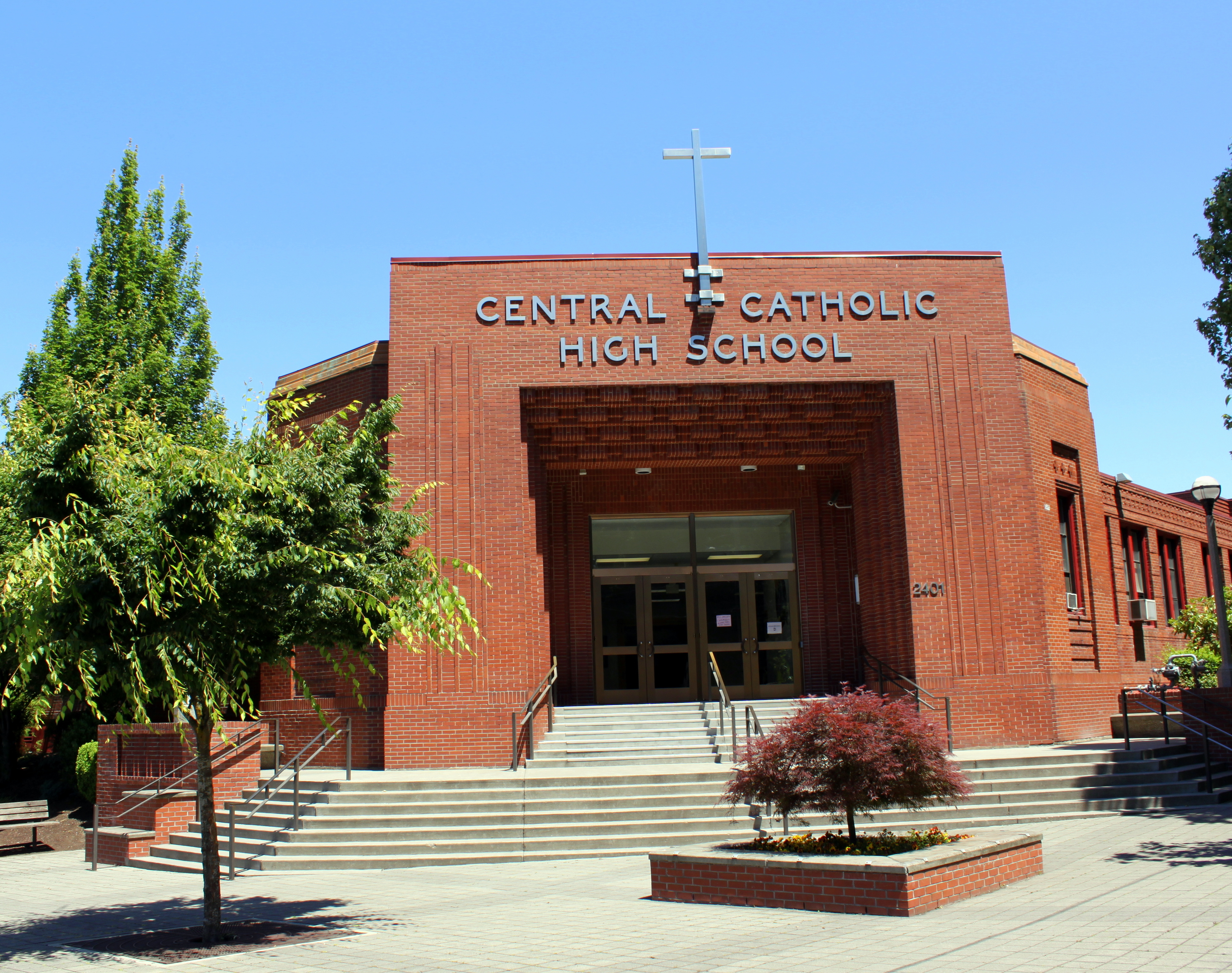

Location
- 2401 SE Stark Street; Portland, (Multnomah County), Oregon 97214; United States; 45°31′12″N 122°38′27″W

Information
- Type: Private, Coeducational
- Religious affiliation: Roman Catholic
- Established: 1939
- President: Colin McGinty
- Principal: Danyelle Ramsey
- Grades: 9–12
- Enrollment: 864 (2026-2027)
- Colors: Cardinal and gold
- Athletics conference: OSAA Mt. Hood Conference 6A-4
- Mascot: Rammy the Ram
- Team name: Rams
- Rival: Jesuit High School
- Accreditation: Northwest Accreditation Commission
- Newspaper: Central Catholic Chronicles
- Website: www.centralcatholichigh.org

Central Catholic High School is a Catholic college prep school located in Portland, Oregon. It is the only archdiocesan high school in the Archdiocese of Portland.

== History ==
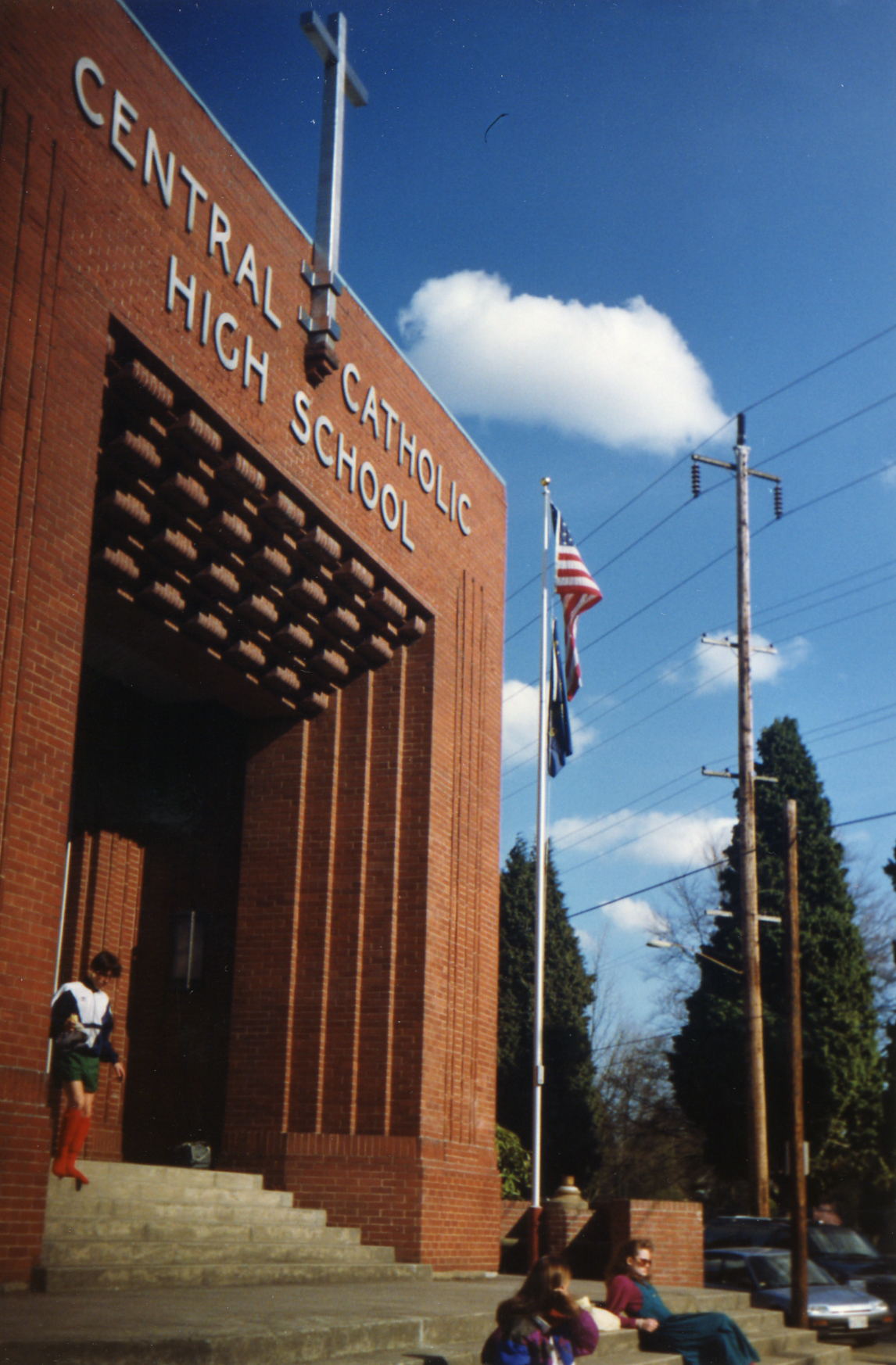
Central Catholic entrance, 1991

Central Catholic was founded in 1934 by Archbishop Edward Howard as a diocesan high school for boys. In 1930, St. Mary's Cemetery was closed and the interments were relocated, mostly to Mount Calvary, and Central Catholic High School was built on the site of the old cemetery. During the Great Depression, Central Catholic High School recruited players from all over the Portland metro area and faced significant challenges in securing funding to build the high school. However, Archbishop Howard visited all of the Portland parishes to raise funding, and a carnival benefit was held to raise more; moreover, in 1938, a generous bequest of $20,000 was left to the school by Susan Kratz, providing the necessary resources for the project to move forward and making it possible to open the school in 1939. It was dedicated on May 9, 1939, and opened with about 125 freshman and sophomore students. The first principal was Father Francis Schaefers.

Initially, the school operated on a pay-as-you-go basis, meeting its expenses with its tuition, which was $50 a year. Overhead was low because many classes were taught by the diocesan priests, who did not take salaries, and by sisters from different congregations, who were paid $50 a month.

While teaching, many of the priests continued their education at universities such as the University of Notre Dame, the University of Oregon, Catholic University, Dominican College of San Rafael, and the University of Chicago.

Central Catholic became a co-ed high school in the 1980s. It accepted the first co-ed students as freshmen and sophomores for the 1980–81 school year. The first co-ed class graduated in 1983.

As part of the COVID-19 pandemic, the company received between $2 million and $5 million in federally backed small business loan from Customers Bank as part of the Paycheck Protection Program. The company stated it would allow them to retain 143 jobs.

== Notable alumni ==
- Blake Brandel, NFL guard for the Minnesota Vikings
- Brady Breeze, NFL safety
- Joey Harrington, former NFL quarterback
- Rich McCormick, U.S. Representative for Georgia's 6th congressional district
- Kitan Oladapo, NFL safety for the Green Bay Packers
- Galen Rupp, Professional Runner
- Cameron Scarlett, NFL running back
- Eric Ueland, former White House Director of Legislative Affairs
- Nick Scardina, USL Soccer Player
