= Archdiocese of Portland in Oregon =

Latin Catholic ecclesiastical jurisdiction in Oregon, USA

Coordinates: 45°31′21″N 122°38′12″W

Archdiocese of Portland in Oregon Archidioecesis Portlandensis in Oregonia

Catholic
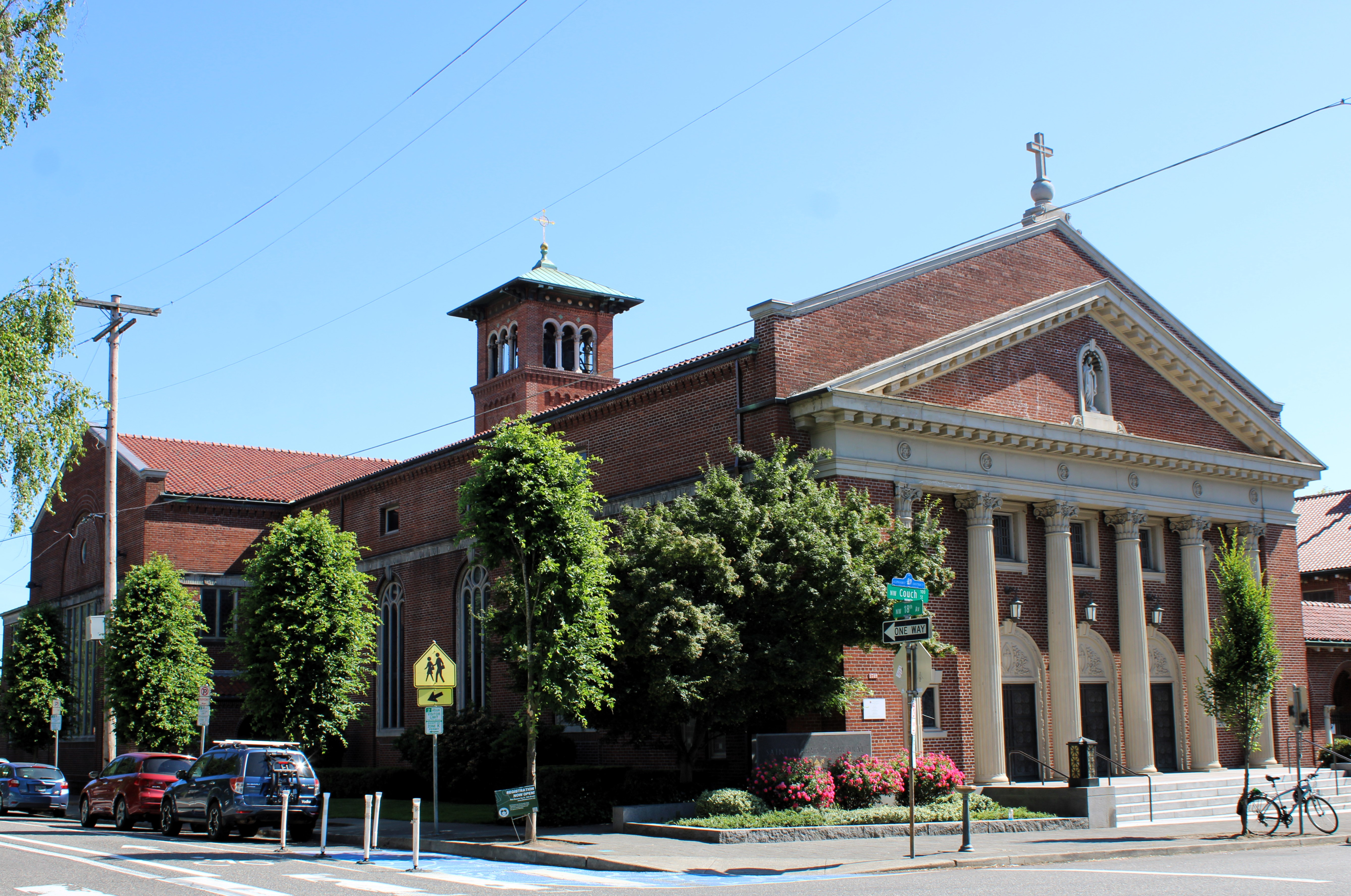
- St. Mary's Cathedral of the Immaculate Conception

- Coat of arms

Location
- Country: United States
- Territory: The counties of Oregon west of the Cascade Range.
- Ecclesiastical province: Province of Portland

Statistics
- Area: 76,937 km^{2} (29,706 sq mi)
- Population: Total; Catholics: (as of 2016); 3,448,824; 431,267 (12.5%)
- Parishes: 124

Information
- Denomination: Catholic
- Sui iuris church: Latin Church
- Rite: Roman Rite
- Established: December 1, 1843 – Vicariate Apostolic of Oregon Territory; July 24, 1846 – Elevated to Diocese of Oregon City; July 29, 1850 – Elevated to Archdiocese of Oregon City; September 26, 1928 – Name changed to Archdiocese of Portland in Oregon
- Cathedral: Saint Mary's Cathedral of the Immaculate Conception
- Patron saint: Immaculate Conception
- Secular priests: 158

Current leadership
- Pope: Leo XIV
- Archbishop: Alexander King Sample
- Auxiliary Bishops: Peter Leslie Smith
- Vicar General: Peter Leslie Smith
- Bishops emeritus: Kenneth Steiner

Map
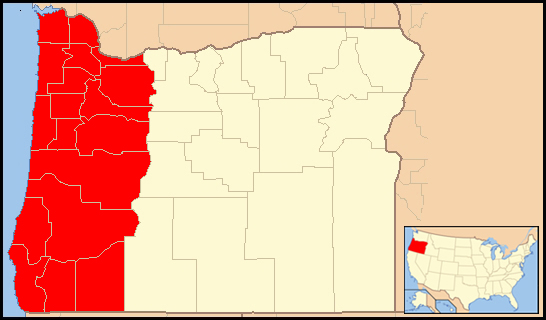

Website
- archdpdx.org

The Archdiocese of Portland in Oregon (Archidioecesis Portlandensis in Oregonia) is an archdiocese of the Catholic Church in western Oregon in the United States. Established in 1846, it was the second Catholic archdiocese in the United States after Baltimore. In 2004, during a sexual abuse scandal, it became the first archdiocese to file for Chapter 11 bankruptcy.

The mother church of the archdiocese is Saint Mary's Cathedral of the Immaculate Conception in Portland. The archbishop is Alexander Sample.

== Statistics ==
The Archdiocese of Portland in Oregon has the following suffragan dioceses:

- Baker in Oregon (eastern)
- Boise in Idaho (all)
- Helena in Montana (western)
- Great Falls–Billings in Montana (eastern)

As of 2024, the archdiocese served 430,700 Catholics. It had 101 diocesan priests, 129 religious priests, 71 permanent deacons, 343 women religious, and 58 religious brothers. The archdiocese had 124 parishes, 23 missions, one seminary, 41 elementary schools, ten secondary schools, and two Catholic colleges.

== History ==
=== 1810 to 1846 ===
When the American expedition of 1810 entered the Willamette Valley of present-day Oregon, it included 13 French-Canadian Catholics. Several of them, including the fur trader Étienne Lucier, decided to settle there. By 1829, Lucier had established a permanent land claim next to the Willamette Fur Post near French Prairie. At this time, the region was claimed by both the United States and Great Britain.

In 1836, Lucier and 15 other Catholic settlers petitioned Auxiliary Bishop Norbert Provencher, head of the church in present-day Manitoba, to send a priest to their settlement. They constructed St. Paul Church, the oldest church in Oregon, in St. Paul, Oregon, that same year. However, the British-owned Hudson's Bay Company (HBC) which owned fur trading concessions in the region, objected to Provencher establishing a Catholic mission in the Willamette Valley. To appease the HBC, Provencher agreed to move the mission north of the Columbia River into present-day Washington State. In 1838, he sent the missionary priests François Norbert Blanchet and Modeste Demers to Fort Vancouver in Washington.

In 1843, the Vatican established the Vicariate Apostolic of the Oregon Territory, with Blanchet as its first vicar apostolic. Along with all of Oregon, the vicariate also included present-day Idaho and Montana. The following year, Pierre-Jean DeSmet, along with other priests and a contingent of the Sisters of Notre Dame de Namur, arrived in Astoria, Oregon, from Belgium.

=== 1846 to 1885 ===
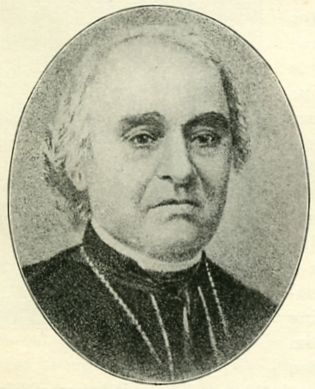
Bishop Blanchet (1919)

In 1846, after the United States and Great Britain settled their borders in the Pacific Northwest, the Vatican elevated the vicariate apostolic to the Archdiocese of Oregon City. The pope designated the Diocese of Walla Walla in Washington State and the Diocese of Vancouver Island in British Columbia as suffragan dioceses. Oregon City became the second American archdiocese, preceded only by the Archdiocese of Baltimore. The pope named Blanchet as the first archbishop of Oregon City.

In 1853, the first Catholic church in Salem, St. Joseph's, was founded. The Vatican erected the Vicariate Apostolic of Idaho and Montana in 1868, taking those territories from the Archdiocese of Oregon City. In 1870, the Catholic Sentinel was founded as the official newspaper of the archdiocese.

Pope Leo XIII named Bishop Charles John Seghers of Vancouver Island as coadjutor archbishop in Oregon City to assist Blanchet in 1878. When Blanchet retired in 1880, Seghers succeeded him. In 1884, Seghers successfully petitioned the Vatican to reappoint him as bishop of Vancouver Island so that he could continue missionary work in Alaska.

=== 1885 to 1928 ===
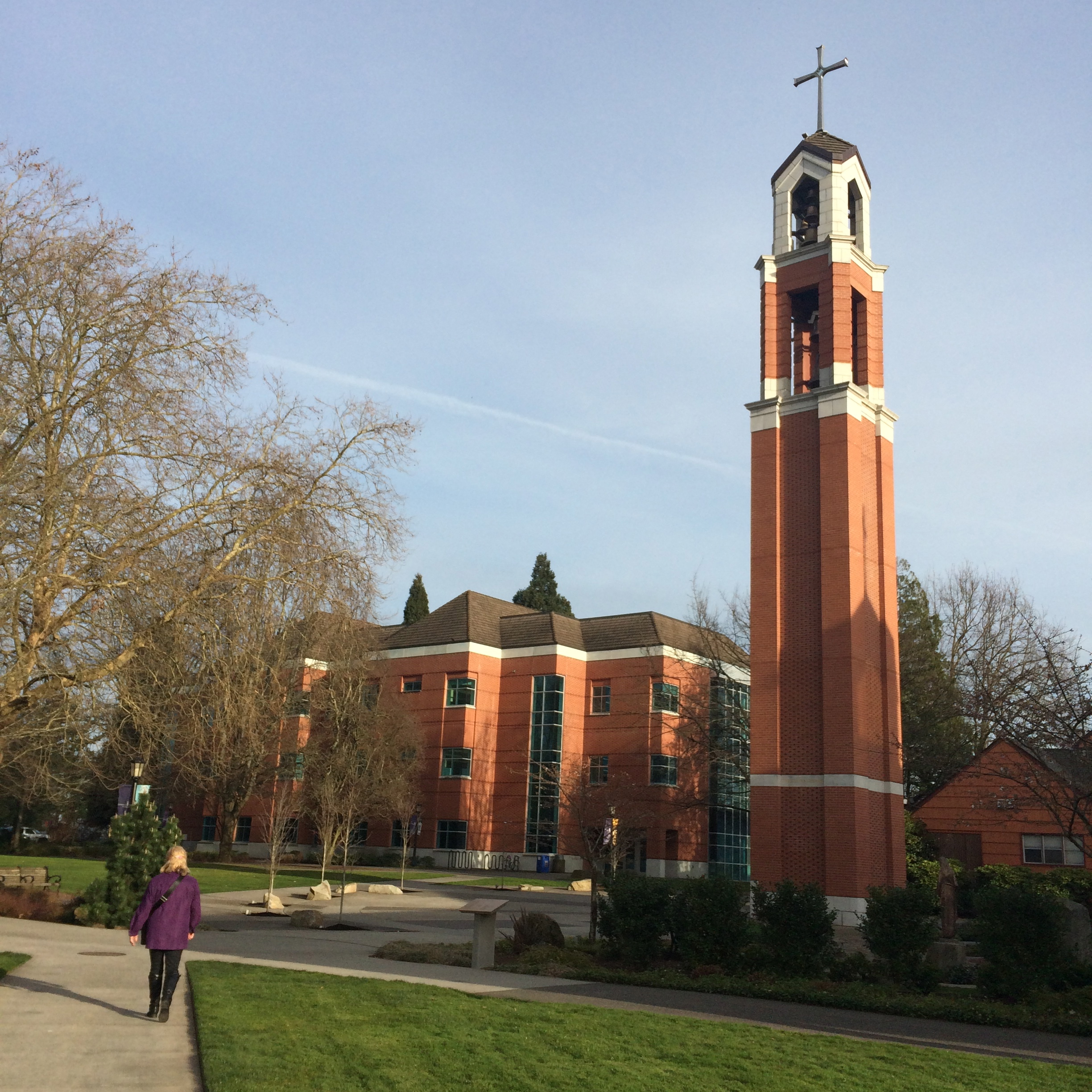
University of Portland, Portland, Oregon (2015)

To replace Seghers in Oregon City, Leo XiII appointed Bishop William Gross from the Diocese of Savannah as archbishop in 1885. Gross dedicated St. Mary's Cathedral of the Immaculate Conception in Portland in 1885 and founded the Sisters of St. Mary of Oregon order in 1886. Gross opened a senior citizens home in 1896 and Mount Angel College in Saint Benedict in 1887. St. Boniface Church in Sublimity and a minor seminary were constructed in 1889. Gross presided over the Third Provincial Council of Oregon in 1891. He died in 1898.

The next archbishop of Oregon City was Bishop Alexander Christie of Vancouver Island, in office since 1899. In 1901, Christie obtained the former campus of Portland University, a Methodist institution. He traded the campus for a couple of archdiocesan properties and a payment of $1. Christie reopened the school as Columbia University, which is today the University of Portland.

In 1903, at Christie's request, the Vatican erected the Diocese of Baker City, covering all of eastern Oregon. The archdiocese opened the Christie Home for Orphaned Girls in 1907 and dedicated St. Mary's Church in Mount Angel in 1912. The Catholic Truth Society was established in 1922, and Christie successfully campaigned against an Oregon law that would eliminate parochial schools, which was eventually settled by the Supreme Court in Pierce v. Society of Sisters. Following Christie's death in 1926, Pope Pius XI named Auxiliary Bishop Edward Howard from the Diocese of Davenport as the fifth archbishop of Oregon City.

=== 1928 to 1974 ===
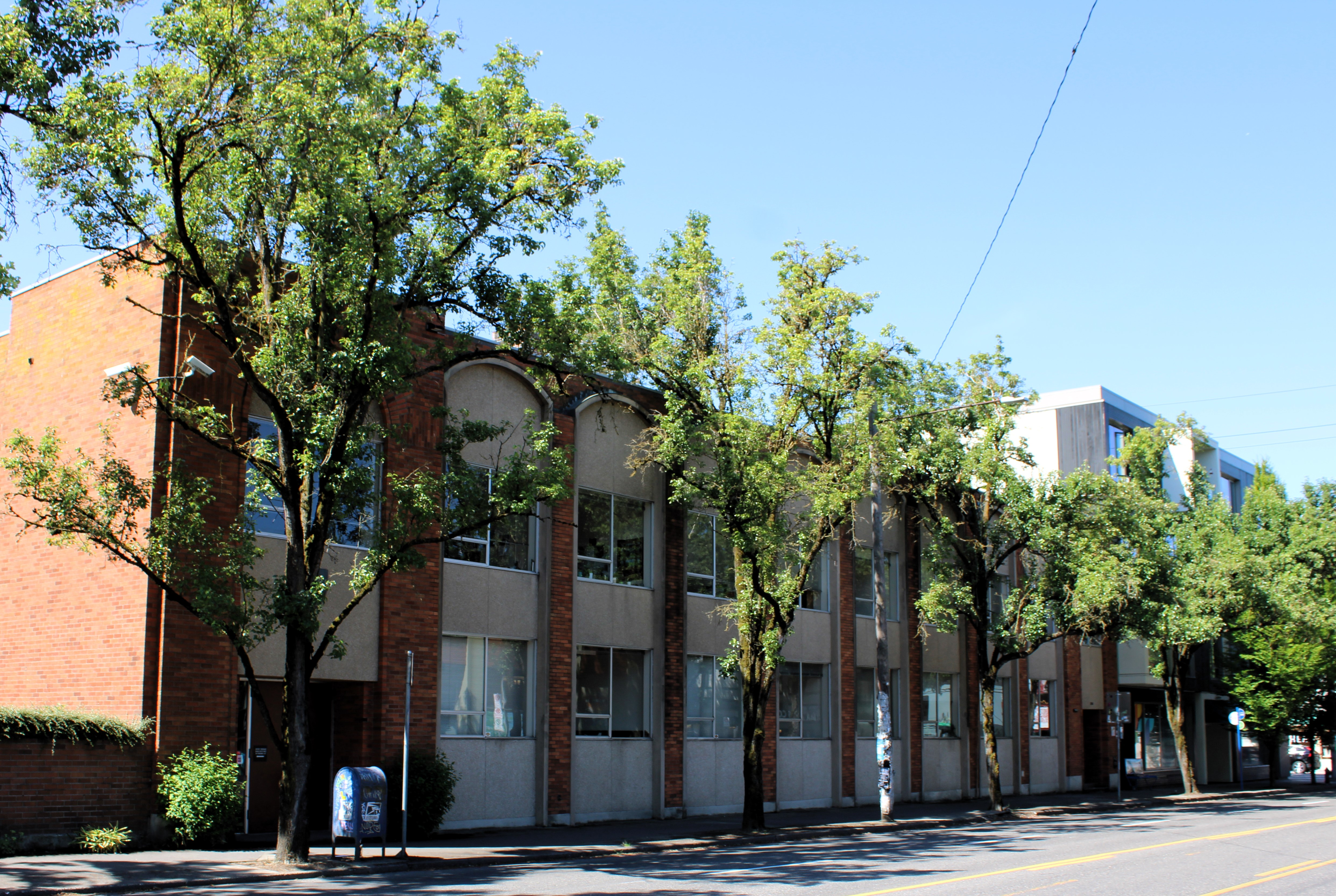
Archdiocesan Pastoral Center, Portland, Oregon (2023)

On September 26, 1928, the Vatican renamed the Archdiocese of Oregon City as the Archdiocese of Portland in Oregon because Portland had grown much larger than Oregon City. To avoid confusion with the Diocese of Portland in Maine, the Vatican added "in Oregon" to the archdiocesan name.

During his tenure as archbishop, Howard created a chancery in the cathedral rectory, later transferring it to a separate building. He reorganized the St. Vincent de Paul and Holy Name Societies, fostered the growth of the local branch of Catholic Charities, and removed the Catholic Sentinel from private ownership.

In 1931, Howard led a successful campaign to repeal local zoning ordinances that prohibited the building of churches and parochial schools. He convened the Fourth Provincial Council of the archdiocese in 1932, and held a synod for the clergy in 1935. In 1939, he founded Central Catholic High School in Portland. He convened the Fifth Provincial Council of the archdiocese in 1957. Howard retired in 1966 after 38 years as bishop. Bishop Robert Dwyer from the Diocese of Reno was his successor. Dwyer retired in 1974 due to poor health. Bishop Cornelius Power of Yakima succeeded him in 1974.

=== 1974 to present ===
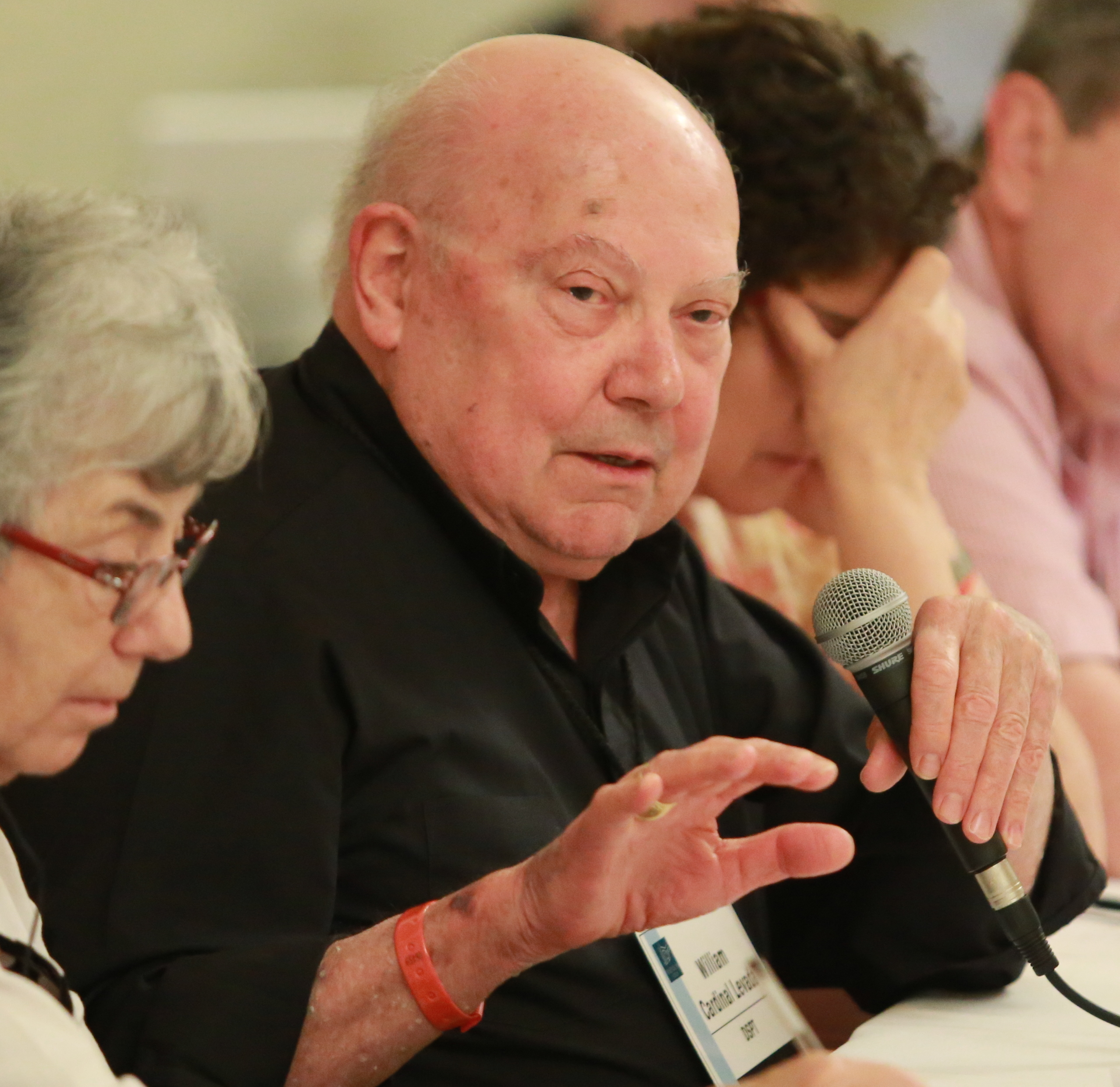
Cardinal Levada (2015)

During his tenure in Portland, Power formed a five-year plan for the archdiocese and created an endowment fund. He founded the Oregon Catholic Conference and held the first clergy and archdiocesan conventions. He reorganized the local curia, Catholic Charities, and re-established Catholic Truth Society of Oregon as the Oregon Catholic Press. Power also encouraged ministries to Spanish-speaking and Southeast Asian residents. He retired in 1986.

Auxiliary Bishop William Levada of the Archdiocese of Los Angeles was the next archbishop of Portland in Oregon, named by Pope John Paul II in 1986. During his tenure in Portland, Levada helped to revitalize Mount Angel Seminary. He briefly taught at the seminary as well. He also reorganized Catholic Charities, worked in outreach to the Hispanic Catholic community, and renovated St. Mary's Cathedral of the Immaculate Conception. Levada became archbishop of San Francisco in 1995.

On January 29, 2013, Bishop Alexander Sample was appointed by Pope Benedict XVI to be the new Archbishop of Portland in Oregon, succeeding John George Vlazny.

==== Titular see of Oregon City ====
In 1996 the title of Archbishop of Oregon City was revived as a titular see; since 2009, the titular Archbishop has been Joseph Augustine Di Noia.

==== Bankruptcy ====
The archdiocese's sexual abuse scandal prompted the archbishop to file for Chapter 11 reorganization for the archdiocese on July 6, 2004. Portland became the first archdiocese or diocese to file for bankruptcy. Vlazny described his actions by saying, "This is not an effort to avoid responsibility. It is, in fact, the only way I can assure that other claimants can be offered fair compensation." In February 2009, the Oregon Jesuit Province also filed for bankruptcy as well.

===== Clergy sexual abuse settlements =====
In April 2007, the archdiocese announced a settlement with sexual abuse victims and the bankruptcy court had approved a financial plan of reorganization. The archdiocese paid $71.45 million to 169 victims, averaging $342,000 each; this was the eighth-largest sexual abuse settlement by a Catholic diocese or archdiocese in American history. The bankruptcy filings listed 11 archdiocese priests as perpetrators of sexual abuse. In March 2011, the Oregon Jesuit Province agreed to pay $166.1 million in damages to nearly 500 victims of sexual abuse by Jesuit clergy.

On August 6, 2016, World Spark, a retirement home provider run by the priest Michael Maslowsky, was forced to surrender documents showing that there had been numerous complaints of sex abuse against vulnerable residents at World Spark's St. Anthony Village elderly home, including some with dementia, between 2009 and 2016. By order, the documents were given to a plaintiff from a lawsuit which began in 2014. On October 1, 2018, it was revealed that Pope Francis had defrocked Maslowsky that summer.

In 2018, Sample acknowledged the history of sex abuse in the archdiocese which he described as an "institutional and spiritual" failure, and issued an apology. At the same time, it was reported that more than 100 sex abuse lawsuits were settled prior to the 2004 bankruptcy. More settlements were issued in August 2019 when the Archdiocese of Portland agreed to pay nearly $4 million to eight men who said they were sexually abused by Pius Brazaukus in the 1970s and the 1980s.

== Bishops ==
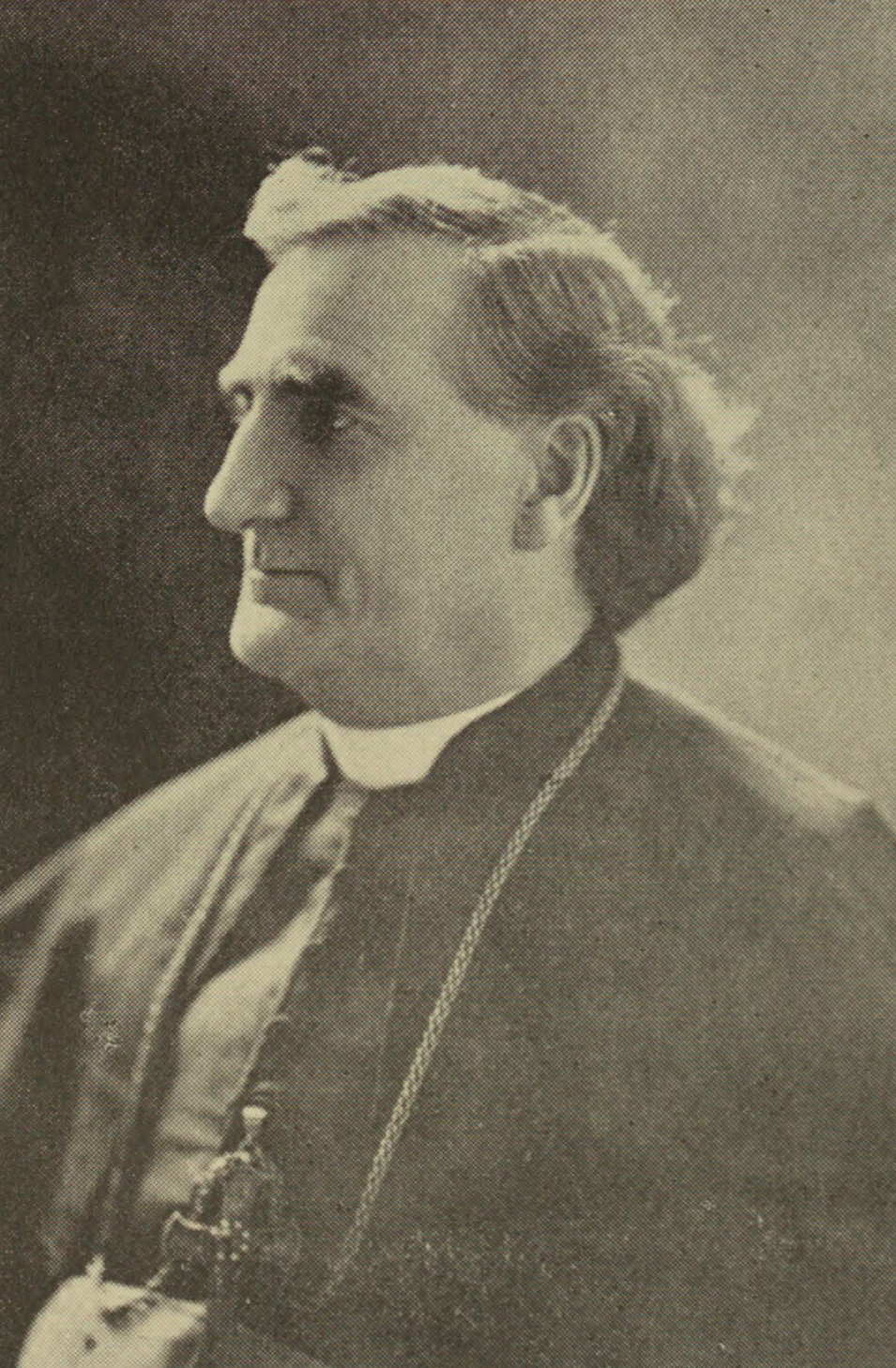
Archbishop Christie (1903)

=== Apostolic Vicar of Oregon Country ===
Francis Norbert Blanchet, appointed Bishop of Oregon City

==== Bishop of Oregon City ====
François Norbert Blanchet (1846–1850), elevated to archbishop

==== Archbishops of Oregon City ====
1. François Norbert Blanchet (1850–1880)
2. Charles John Seghers (1880–1884)
3. William Hickley Gross (1885–1898)
4. Alexander Christie (1899–1925)
5. Edward D. Howard (1926–1928), title changed with title of archdiocese

==== Archbishops of Portland in Oregon ====
1. Edward D. Howard (1928–1966)
2. Robert Dwyer (1966–1974)
3. Cornelius M. Power (1974–1986)
4. William J. Levada (1986–1995), appointed Archbishop of San Francisco and later Prefect of the Congregation for the Doctrine of the Faith (elevated to Cardinal in 2006)
5. Francis George (1996–1997), appointed Archbishop of Chicago (Cardinal in 1998)
6. John G. Vlazny (1997–2013)
7. Alexander K. Sample (2013–present)

=== Current auxiliary bishop ===
Peter Leslie Smith (2014–present)

=== Former auxiliary bishops ===
- Paul Edward Waldschmidt (1977–1990)
- Kenneth Steiner (1977–2011)

=== Other diocesan priests who became bishops ===
- Edward John O'Dea, appointed Bishop of Nesqually in 1896
- Charles Joseph O'Reilly, appointed Bishop of Baker City in 1903 and later Bishop of Lincoln
- Edwin Vincent O'Hara, appointed Bishop of Great Falls in 1930
- Francis Peter Leipzig, appointed Bishop of Baker City in 1950
- Liam S. Cary, appointed Bishop of Baker in 2012

== High schools ==
This is a list of Catholic high schools in the Archdiocese of Portland in Oregon.

- Blanchet Catholic School – Salem
- Central Catholic High School – Portland
- Jesuit High School – Portland address, closer to Beaverton
- La Salle Catholic College Preparatory – Portland
- La Salle High School – Milwaukie
- Marist Catholic High School – Eugene
- Regis St. Mary High School – Stayton
- St. Mary's Academy – Portland
- St. Mary's High School – Medford
- Valley Catholic High School – Beaverton
