= Alexander Christie (bishop) =

American prelate

The Most Reverend Alexander Christie
- Archbishop of Oregon City
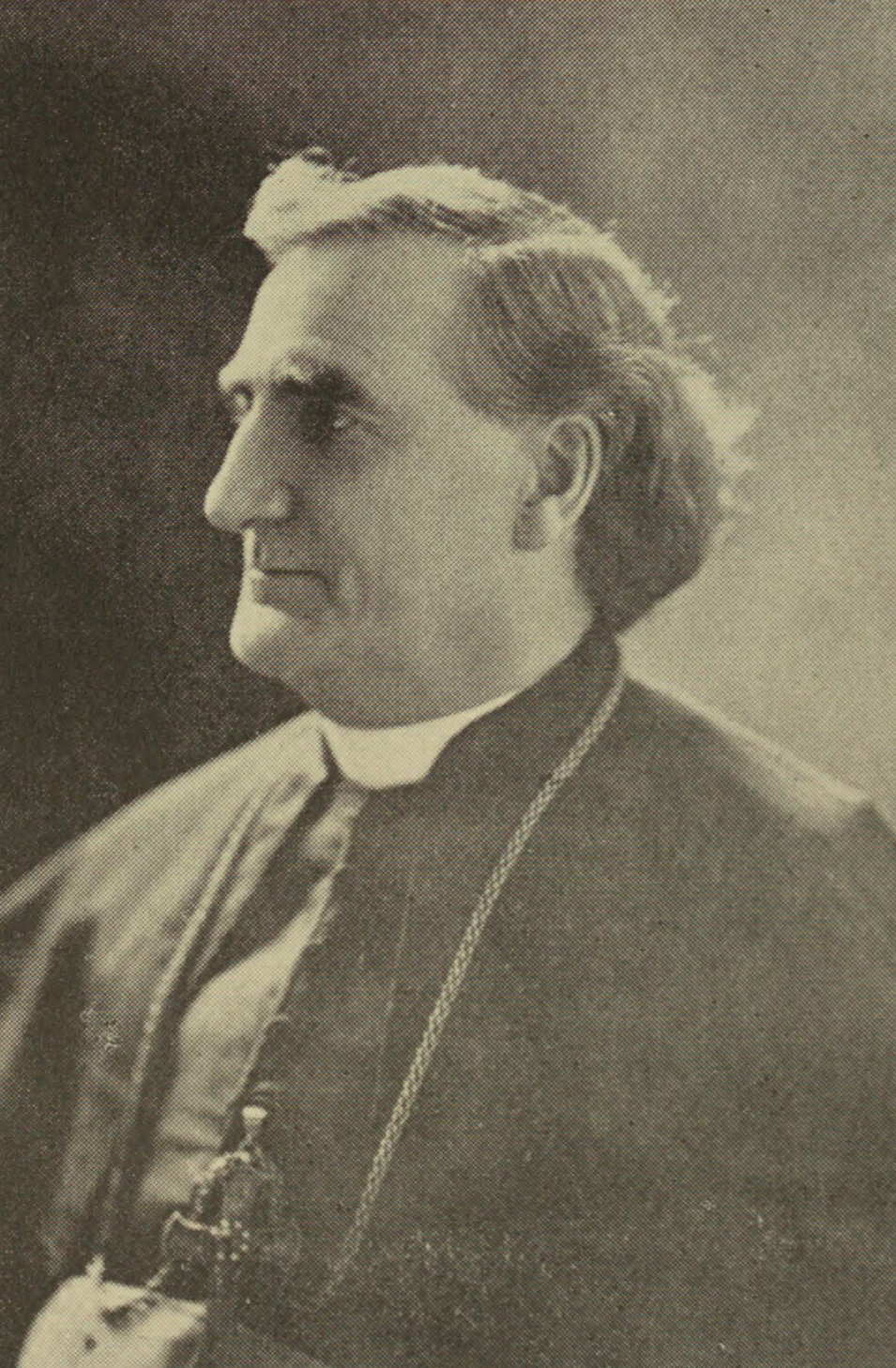
- Church: Catholic
- Archdiocese: Oregon City
- Appointed: March 4, 1899
- Term ended: April 6, 1925
- Predecessor: William Hickley Gross
- Successor: Edward Howard
- Other post: Bishop of Vancouver Island (1898-1899)

Orders
- Ordination: December 22, 1877 by Édouard-Charles Fabre
- Consecration: June 29, 1898 by John Ireland

Personal details
- Born: May 28, 1848 Highgate, Vermont
- Died: April 6, 1925 (aged 76) Portland, Oregon
- Coat of arms

Alexander Christie (May 28, 1848 – April 6, 1925) was an American prelate of the Roman Catholic Church. He served as Bishop of Vancouver Island (1898–1899) and Archbishop of Oregon City (1899–1925). He founded the University of Portland in 1901.

== Biography ==
Christie was born in Highgate, Vermont and later moved with his family to Wisconsin and, after the end of the Civil War, to Austin, Minnesota. He studied at the Grand Seminary of Montreal from 1874 to 1877, and was ordained a priest on December 2, 1877. He served as pastor of Sacred Heart Church in Waseca from 1878 until 1890, when he was transferred to the new Church of the Ascension in Minneapolis, Minnesota. From 1894 to 1898, he was pastor of St. Stephen's Church in Minneapolis.

== Episcopacy ==
=== Bishop ===
On March 26, 1898, Christie was appointed Bishop of Vancouver Island in British Columbia by Pope Leo XIII. He received his episcopal consecration on the following June 29 from Archbishop John Ireland, with Bishop Jean-Baptiste Brondel and John Shanley serving as co-consecrators.

=== Archbishop ===
Christie was named Archbishop of Oregon City on March 4, 1899. Bishop Christie founded the University of Portland. According to University tradition, while on board a ship in the Willamette River, Christie observed the abandoned West Hall atop Waud's Bluff, formerly the site of the Methodist Portland University and decided to purchase it. Originally called "Columbia University" after the nearby river, it opened September 5, 1901. The following year he persuaded the Congregation of Holy Cross to assume control, telling them "Take over Columbia and make it the Notre Dame of the Pacific Northwest!"

One of Christie's early priorities was to have the Archdiocese divided into something more manageable. The Diocese of Baker City was created in 1903, assuming responsibility for all of the state east of the Cascades. The Christie Home for Orphaned Girls was opened in 1907.

The Catholic Truth Society was established in 1922, and he successfully campaigned against an Oregon law that would eliminate parochial schools, which was eventually settled by the Supreme Court in Pierce v. Society of Sisters.

After a steady decline in health, Bishop Christie died, at age 76, and was buried at Mount Calvary Cemetery in Portland.

Catholic Church titles
| Preceded by Jean-Nicolas Lemmens | Bishop of Vancouver Island; 1898–1899 | Succeeded by Bertram Orth |
| Preceded by William Hickley Gross | Archbishop of Oregon City; 1899–1925 | Succeeded by Edward Daniel Howard |
