= Saint Benedict, Oregon =

Unincorporated community in the state of Oregon, United States

Coordinates: 45.057065°N 122.774257°W

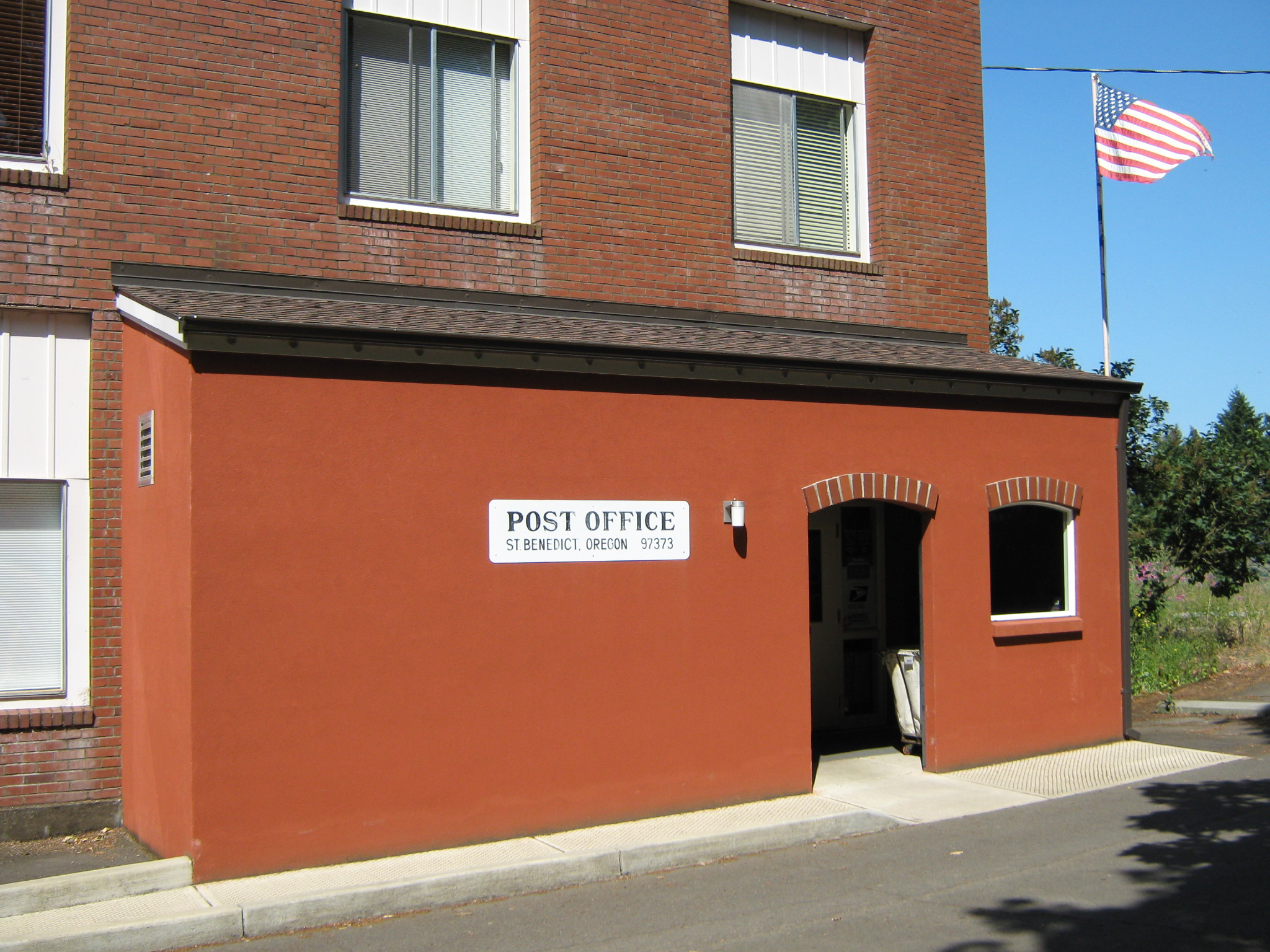
Saint Benedict, Oregon, 97373

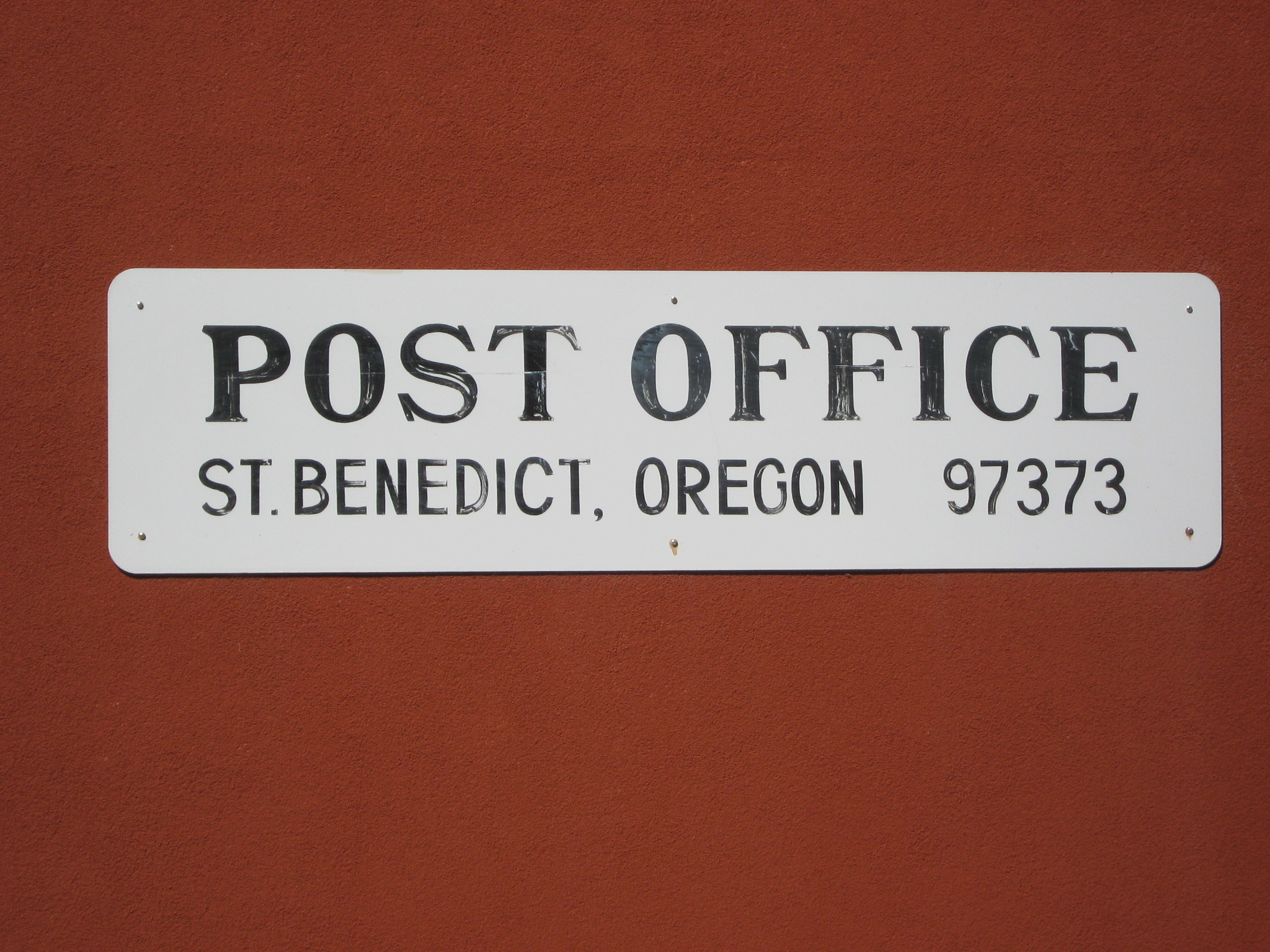
Sign on post office

Saint Benedict is the name of the post office at Mount Angel Abbey in Marion County, Oregon, United States.

When it moved from Gervais to the town of Mt. Angel in 1884, the postal service would not allow the abbey to establish its own post office as it was less than a mile from the Mount Angel post office. A new abbey was completed on the top of nearby Mount Angel butte in 1903, and Saint Benedict post office was established there in 1914. Mount Angel Abbey was originally named Saint Benedict's Abbey, which in turn was named for Benedict of Nursia, the founder of the Order of Saint Benedict. The ZIP code of the post office is 97373.
