= Mount Angel Abbey =

Benedictine monastery in Saint Benedict, Oregon

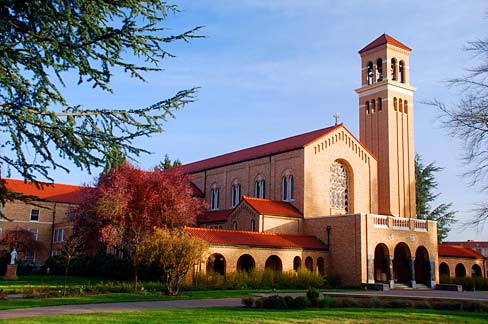

- Location in the United States Location in Oregon

Monastery information
- Order: Benedictine
- Established: October 30, 1882
- Mother house: Engelberg Abbey
- Diocese: Archdiocese of Portland in Oregon

People
- Abbot: The Right Rev. Jeremy Driscoll, O.S.B.
- Prior: Rev. Teresio Caldwell, O.S.B.
- Archbishop: The Most Rev. Alexander Sample

Site
- Coordinates: 45.057°N 122.775°W
- Website: www.mountangelabbey.org

Mount Angel Abbey is a Benedictine monastery located in Saint Benedict, Oregon, United States, northeast of Salem. It was established 144 years ago in 1882 from Engelberg Abbey, in Switzerland. The abbey, located on the top of Mount Angel, a 485-foot-high butte (148 m), has its own post office separate from the city of Mt. Angel. As of 2021, the abbey is home to approximately 51 monks.

== History ==
=== 1882–1903: Establishment ===
Mount Angel Abbey was founded on October 30, 1882, by Benedictine monks who immigrated to the United States from Engelberg, Switzerland. It was conceived by Father Adelhelm Odermatt, a monk of Engelberg Abbey who was working in Missouri.

Five years after the abbey's foundation, the monks opened their school in 1887 under the name of Mount Angel College. In 1889, at the request of Archbishop William Gross of Oregon City, the monks established a seminary in conjunction with their college.

=== 1904–Present: Expansion ===
In 1904, the community was officially declared an abbey, which meant that it became independent from its motherhouse in Switzerland. Thomas Meienhofer, also a native of Switzerland, was elected the first abbot. In 1926, a second fire destroyed the monastery, forcing the community into private homes and the nearby parish school and rectory. The monks began rebuilding, and in 1930 erected Aquinas Hall. A gymnasium followed in 1936. In 1939, the abbey's first daughterhouse, Westminster Abbey, was established in Mission, British Columbia. In 1946, the college was shut down and the community focussed on its seminary and boys' preparatory school. In 1959, a retreat house was constructed to serve the spiritual needs of laypeople. In the early 1950s, the monastery became one of approximately 900 locations that would serve as emergency hospitals in the event of a nuclear war.

In 1965, two new monasteries were started from Mount Angel Abbey: Ascension Priory in Idaho, and Our Lady of the Angels Abbey in Cuernavaca, Mexico. In 1980, Father Bonaventure Zerr was elected as the seventh abbot, establishing a new library for not only seminarians, but for the use of scholarly research. The library at the abbey was designed by Finnish architect Alvar Aalto. Though the seminary has historically been the central focus of the abbey, it has also become open to non-seminarians seeking degrees in philosophy and theology. In the 1970s, the abbey community had a total of 125 monks living on the grounds, making it one of the largest Benedictine male communities in the United States.

== Abbots ==
The abbey's abbots since 1904 are as follows.

- 1904-1910: Thomas Aquinas Meienhofer
- 1910-1921: Placidus Fuerst
- 1921-1934: Bernard Murphy
- 1934-1950: Thomas Aquinas Meier
- 1950-1974: Damian Jentges
- 1974-1980: Anselm Galvin
- 1980-1988: Bonaventure Zerr
- 1988-1997: Peter Eberle
- 1997-2001: Joseph Wood
- 2001-2009: Nathan Zodrow
- 2009-2016: Gregory Duerr
- 2016–present: Jeremy Driscoll

== Seminary and School of Theology ==
Mount Angel Seminary, which was originally part of the now closed Mount Angel College, serves numerous western dioceses and has approximately 170 students. The college was originally composed of seven schools, but as the college turned its focus toward the seminary, the two remaining schools are the liberal arts college and the Graduate School of Theology. The seminary's main church has a tower that contains the largest free-swinging bells on the west coast. In 2006, a new seminary building received a Best Sustainable Award for Oregon and Washington. The following year, to commemorate the abbey's 125th anniversary, a new bell tower was erected.

The seminary has undergraduate and graduate programs. The undergraduate program is devoted towards a bachelor's degree in philosophy. The four-year liberal arts curriculum, leading to a Bachelor of Arts degree, may be completed with a major in philosophy, a double major in Philosophy and Literature, or a double major in Philosophy and Religious Studies. The seminary offers degrees to both lay students and those studying for the priesthood. The Graduate School of Theology offers MDiv, MA (Theology), STB, and DMin degree programs.

== Library ==
The Mount Angel Library was designed by Finnish architect Alvar Aalto, built in 1970, and renovated in 1980. The library is used by both seminary students and theology students and contains 240,000 physical volumes and 100,000 electronic volumes (30% religion, 10% philosophy, and 60% history, art, music, and more), offering the largest theology collection in the Northwest United States. In addition to a wide range of books, the library also has an archive of medieval manuscripts dating back to the 12th century. The library has digitized multiple manuscripts, many from England, France, and Italy, through the Ethiopic Manuscripts Digitization Project.

== Museum ==
The Mount Angel Abbey Museum is a collection of assorted artifacts, including mounted animal dioramas, rocks and minerals, serendipitous objects, antique liturgical vestments, religious items, and Civil War memorabilia.

== Benedictine Brewery ==
In 2018, the third monastic brewery in the United States opened at the abbey. Brewing is common among Trappists, but is also part of the Benedictine tradition—which is the order that occupies the Mount Angel Abbey, a 350-acre (1.4 km^{2}) monastery secluded on a wooded butte above the small farming town of Mount Angel. Abbey monks now brew beer.

== See also ==
- Engelberg Abbey, the parent abbey of Mount Angel
- Westminster Abbey (British Columbia)
