= St. Mary's Cathedral (Portland, Oregon) =

Historic church in Oregon, United States

- St. Mary's Cathedral of the Immaculate Conception
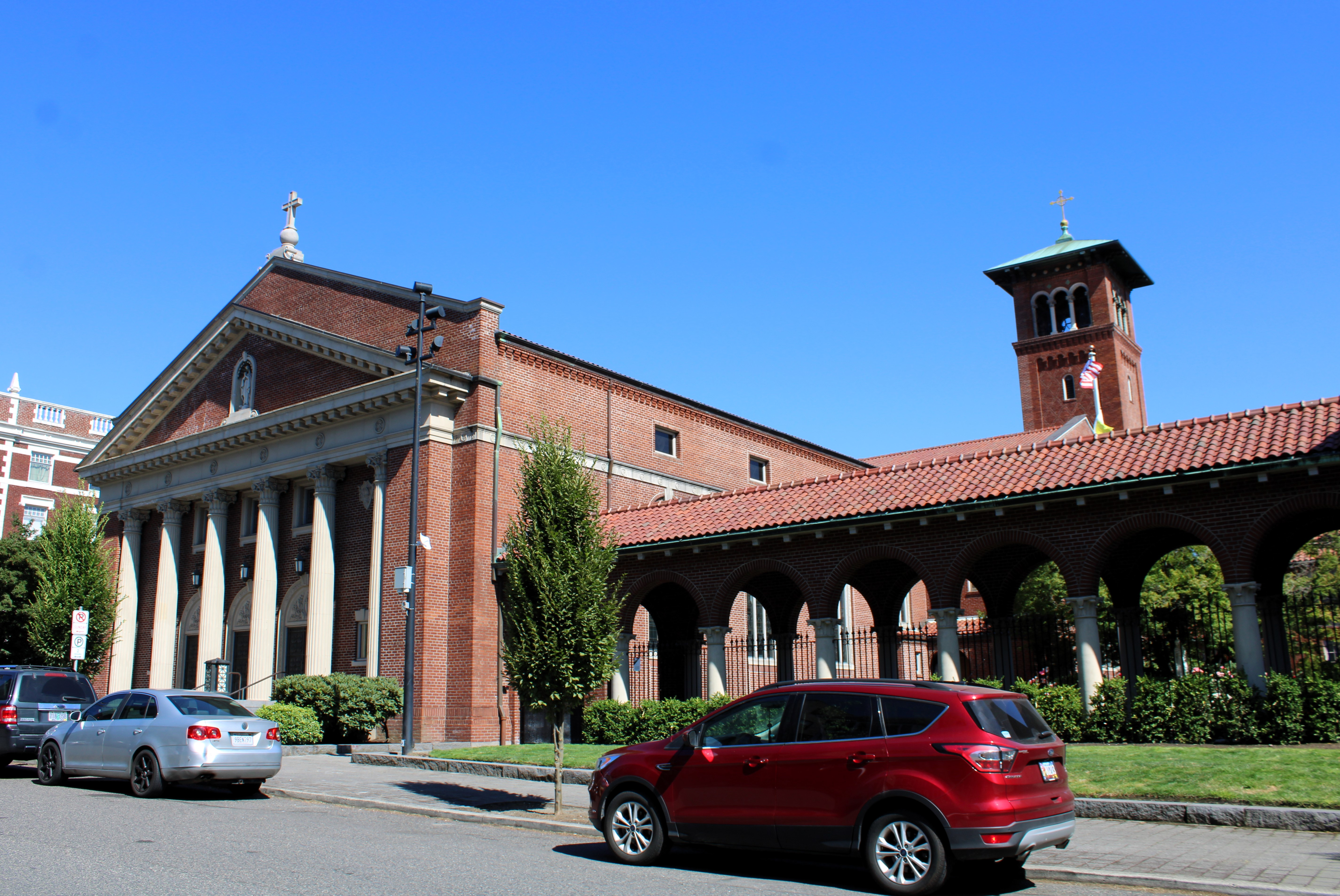
- The cathedral in 2023

- Location in downtown Portland
- 45.5239°N 122.6890°W
- Country: United States
- Denomination: Roman Catholic

History
- Dedicated: February 14, 1926

Administration
- Archdiocese: Portland in Oregon

Clergy
- Archbishop: Most Rev. Alexander K. Sample
- Rector: Rev. Msgr. Gerard O'Connor
- St. Mary's Cathedral
- U.S. Historic district – Contributing property
- Location: 1716 NW Davis Street; Portland, Oregon
- Built: 1925
- Architect: Jacobberger & Smith
- Architectural style: Romanesque Revival
- Restored: 1996
- Part of: Alphabet Historic District (ID00001293)

St. Mary's Cathedral of the Immaculate Conception is a Catholic cathedral in Portland, Oregon in the United States. It is the seat of the Archdiocese of Portland in Oregon.

== History ==
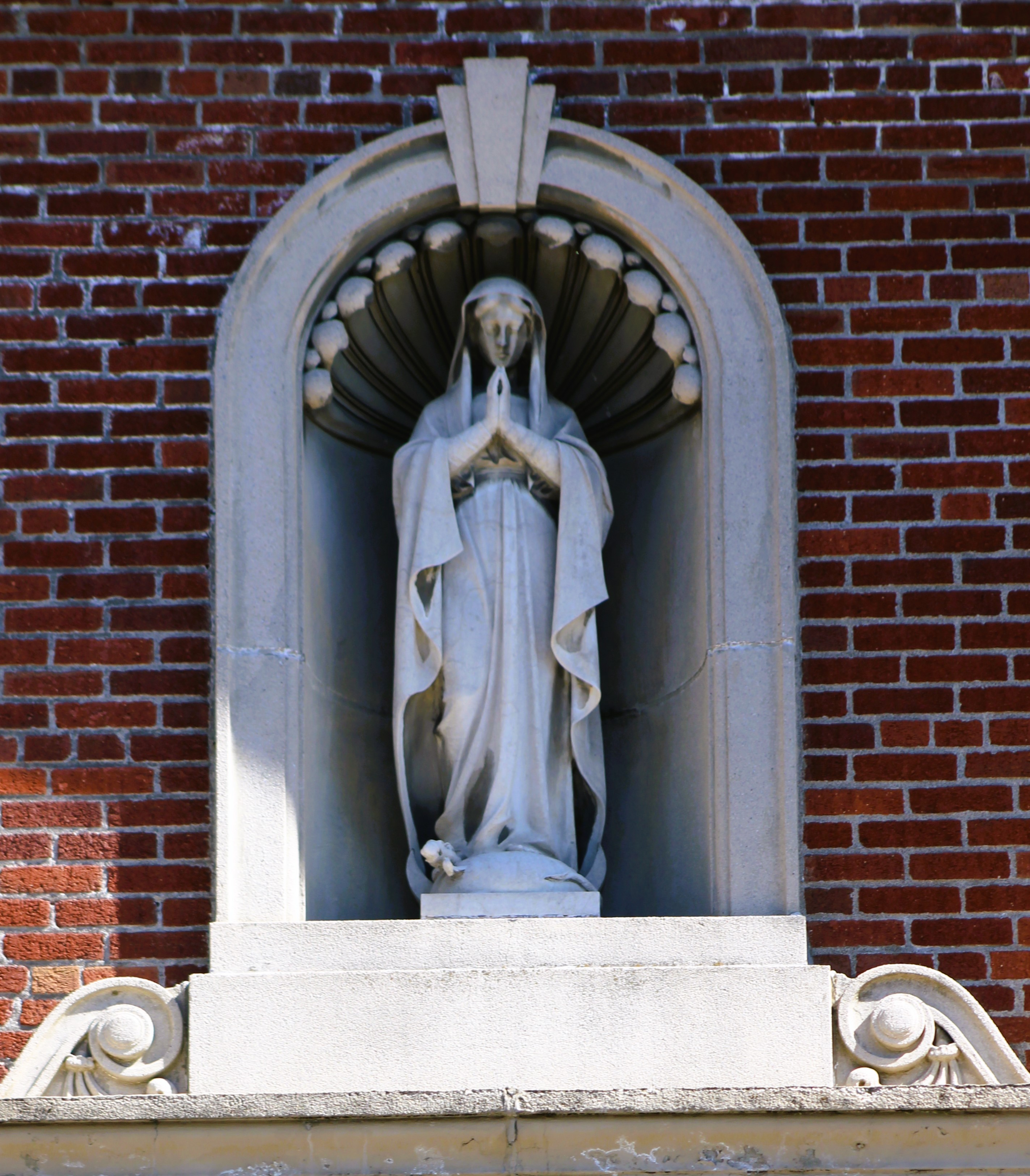
Virgin Mary, Saint Mary's Cathedral (2023)

During the 1840's, Catholics living in the Oregon Territory were under the jurisdiction of the Archdiocese of Oregon City. In 1851, Bishop François Norbert Blanchet erected St. Mary's Parish; the parishioners built a church in a forested area outside of the center of Portland. The parishioners in 1854 moved to the location of the current cathedral, deeming it more convenient for them.

In 1862, recognizing that Portland was now the largest city in the archdiocese, Norbert moved his residence there from Oregon City and designated Saint Mary's Church as his cathedral. In 1885, the archdiocese erected a new St. Mary's Cathedral was erected on the site of the church, but it was destroyed by the Willamette River flood of 1894. The archdiocese then built a school and pro-cathedral (temporary cathedral( while preparing to build a new cathedral.

In 1925, Archbishop Alexander Christie authorized construction of a new cathedral at the corner of NW 18th and Couch streets. Parishioners and clergy from all over the archdiocese responded. In less than a year, on February 14, 1926, the new church opened. The first services were held on Friday, February 19, 1926. In 1928, Pope Pius XI finally suppressed the Archdiocese of Oregon City and formally erected the Archdiocese of Portland in Oregon.

In 1993, Archbishop William J. Levada ordered a study on the restoration of Saint Mary's Cathedral. Thomas Hacker and Associates, a Portland architectural firm, was asked to draft a restoration plan as well as a larger master plan. The plans included seismic strengthening of the building and the updating of the electrical, heating, and lighting systems. The archdiocese also made liturgical and artistic modifications inside the building. The restoration project was completed in 1996

== Art ==
The marble statues of Mary and the Sacred Heart were carved in Switzerland and brought to Omaha by the Benedictine monks.

== Architectural style and details ==
Saint Mary's Cathedral was designed by the architectural firm of Jacobberger and Smith in Portland. The archdiocese selected a mix of 20th-century Romanesque and Byzantine styles for the cathedral.

=== Exterior ===
Saint Mary's has a red tiled gable roof, cast-stone Corinthian columns, and a square bell tower with copper cornices. The main entrance doors are white oak in cast bronze on the exterior. Letters on the granite sign are Roman majuscules from the Trajan inscription in Rome. The coat of arms on the sign is of the archdiocese.

The three bells of the tower were cast in the late 1880s and originally installed in the former cathedral at Third and Stark Streets. They were manually pealed until 2017, when the bells and yokes were refurbished and fitted with linear ringing motors. The bells sound at the pitches of D¹, F¹, and Ab¹.

=== Interior ===
The marble floor in the apse was laid in 1926. The new marble on the floor in the remainder of the cathedral is a pattern of several Italian marbles. The glass etching on the narthax doors contain subtle symbols of the seven Sacraments. The transept windows date from the 1870s and were brought from two earlier cathedrals, along with the cathedra. The dome over the altar, along with the stations of the cross, were created in 1925.

== See also ==
- Culture of Portland, Oregon
- List of Catholic cathedrals in the United States
- List of cathedrals in the United States
- Religion in Portland, Oregon
