= 2021 St. Charles Bend strike =

2021 labor strike in Bend, Oregon

- Date: March 4–15, 2021 (1 week and 4 days)
- Location: Bend, Oregon, United States
- Caused by: Failure to agree to labor contract
- Goals: Labor contract addressing cost of living adjustments and higher wages
- Methods: Strike action; Picketing
- Result: Union and hospital agree to a labor contract

Parties
St. Charles Medical Center – Bend	Oregon Federation of Nurses and Health Professionals Local 5017

The 2021 St. Charles Bend strike was a labor strike involving technical workers at the St. Charles Medical Center – Bend in Bend, Oregon, United States. The strike was precipitated when, in 2019, the workers at the hospital unionized with the Oregon Federation of Nurses and Health Professionals. Following this, the union's bargaining unit began to negotiate a labor contract between the workers and the hospital, with several dozen negotiating meetings following over the next year. By December 2020, however, both sides were at an impasse, and in February 2021, the union filed a strike notice. Despite legal challenges by the hospital, the strike commenced on March 4. On March 13, both sides agreed to a proposal by a federal mediator, with workers to return to work while both sides continued to negotiate a contract, with a deadline of March 31. The strike officially ended on March 15 and workers returned to the hospital. A contract was eventually ratified between the union and hospital by the end of that month.

== Background ==
In Bend, Oregon, the St. Charles Health System operates the St. Charles Medical Center – Bend, a hospital commonly known as St. Charles Bend. According to Oregon Public Broadcasting (OPB), the hospital "receives some of the most seriously ill and injured patients for over 30,000 square miles of Oregon". In 2021, the health system was both the largest employer and only hospital system in central Oregon, prompting Oregon Employment Department economist Damon Runberg to refer to it as a "monopsony". According to OPB, there were a number of labor dispute issues at the hospital throughout the 2010s. In 2013, two separate class action lawsuits were filed by employees of the hospital, resulting in settlements in 2017 that saw over $10 million paid out to over 1,100 workers. Additionally, between 2017 and 2018, the Oregon Health Authority investigated understaffing issues with the health system, and between 2018 and 2021, the Oregon Bureau of Labor and Industries received 11 complaints from workers at the health system regarding wage violations, with 10 of the complaints prompting warning letters from the bureau to the health system. In 2020, the health system admitted to violating state laws regarding meal and rest breaks.

In September 2019, technical workers (including medical technicians, technologists, and therapists) at the hospital voted 90 to 34 to unionize, joining the Oregon Federation of Nurses and Health Professionals (OFNHP), an affiliate labor union of the American Federation of Teachers, which represented over 5,000 other workers at that time. The local union was given the designation Local 5017. That same year, the union formed a bargaining unit and began to negotiate their first ever labor contract with the hospital. In early December 2020, after 28 negotiation meetings, the hospital submitted a labor contract proposal which was ill-received by union members. According to union representatives, the hospital did not provide the market analyses they had used in creating their proposal. Additionally, the contract included only a 0.5 percent annual cost of living adjustment, which was less than the adjustment guaranteed to nurses at the hospital unionized under the Oregon Nurses Association. Union members also claimed they were being paid less than technical workers in other areas, with Sam Potter (a union organizer affiliated with the OFNHP) claiming that the workers at St. Charles Bend made 20 percent less than technical workers in Portland, Oregon. Following negotiations on December 3, further negotiations between the union and hospital were cancelled. In 2021, over 100 people picketed on January 30 and February 1 in front of the hospital in support of the technical workers.

On February 22, the union (which at this time represented 156 technical workers at the hospital) filed a strike notice with the National Labor Relations Board (NLRB). The announcement came on a Monday, with 94 percent of union members voting to approve the strike over the weekend. The notice said that the strike would begin ten days thereafter, which would tentatively place the start date at March 4. The hospital responded to the notice on the same day in a press release wherein they accused the union of bad faith bargaining and stated their intent to file an unfair labor practice charge against the union with the NLRB. In a March 1 press release, the hospital stated that two charges had been filed with the NLRB. One charge pertained to bad faith bargaining, while the other charge argued that the union did not follow proper labor laws regarding notification periods for a strike, making the strike notice unlawful. Additionally, the hospital filed an injunction with the court system to "ensure healthcare services are maintained until the issue can be resolved". The following day, U.S. District Court Judge Michael J. McShane denied the injunction, claiming that issuing the restraining order was outside of his power.

On March 3, the day before the strike was due to begin, the hospital extended an offer to the union wherein they would return to bargaining if the union cancelled the strike. This offer was countered by the union, who stated they would be willing to bargain if the hospital agreed to a strike delay rather than a cancellation. Potter, discussing the prospects of returning to the bargaining table after cancelling the strike, said, "We would be coming back to the table having given up every single piece of leverage." Ultimately, no agreement was made. Prior to the beginning of the strike, the union and hospital had arranged for federal mediation talks on March 10.

== Course of the strike ==
The strike began on March 4, making it the first strike in St. Charles's history since a nurses' strike in 1980. On the first day, picketing took place outside the hospital, with many strikers wearing red face masks and holding signs reading "On strike against unfair labor practices". Several elected officials voiced their support for the strikers, including U.S. Senator Jeff Merkley and State Representative Jason Kropf (both members of the Democratic Party). Over the course of the strike, Kropf and District Attorney John Hummel joined the picket line with the strikers. Due to the strike, the hospital limited the number of surgeries performed. Additionally, some cases were relocated to St. Charles Medical Center – Redmond. In order to maintain operations, St. Charles Bend contracted several dozen replacement workers. However, in a March 8 article in The Bulletin, multiple registered nurses at the hospital expressed concerns over the qualifications of the replacement workers, with several claiming a more hectic work environment due to the replacement workers not being familiar with the systems used at the hospital. Several nurses picketed with strikers that same day. Also on March 8, the union released a press release claiming that over $25,000 had been raised in donations from the community for the strike fund. A competing press release issued by the hospital the same day criticized the union as "unresponsive". At this time, a report by local television station KTVZ reported that the union and hospital had agreed to an hourly wage of $41.94 for the first year of the contract, but disagreed on the wages for the second through fifth years of the contract. Additionally, the union was requesting for the hospital to become a closed shop, while the hospital favored an open shop model.

On the morning of March 10, union and hospital representatives met with a federal mediator to resume contract negotiations. The meeting, held virtually over Zoom, was the first meeting held between the two groups in over three months. According to union representatives, the meeting lasted until 9 p.m., at which time hospital representatives left. Hospital representatives asked for workers to return to work while negotiations were underway, a request which was rejected by the union. Representatives met with the mediator again the following day. On March 13, in a joint press release, the hospital and union stated that they had accepted the mediator's offer, resulting in an end to strike action and no media contact from either side until the morning of March 16. As the agreement was made on a Saturday, workers returned to work the following Monday, March 15. As part of the agreement, both sides would continue to meet over the next several days and secure a contract by March 31. As reported by OPB, the strike officially ended on March 15, 11 days after it began.

== Aftermath ==
On March 28, it was reported that the union and hospital had come to a tentative agreement regarding a new labor contract, with union members set to begin voting on the contract on March 31. The contract, which would last for three years, was ratified later that day. According to the union, the contract would raise wages approximately 25 percent, while hospital officials claimed that the pay would only increase 11 percent. Additional provisions included wage formulas that would be locked for three years and the ability to request a wage audit.

== See also ==
- COVID-19 pandemic in Oregon
- Impact of the COVID-19 pandemic on healthcare workers
- Impact of the COVID-19 pandemic on hospitals
- Strikes during the COVID-19 pandemic
