= Joseph Francis McGrath =

Irish-born American prelate

His Excellency, The Most Reverend Joseph Francis McGrath
- Bishop of Baker City
- Church: Catholic Church
- Diocese: Baker City
- Appointed: December 21, 1918
- Term ended: April 12, 1950 (his death)
- Predecessor: Charles Joseph O'Reilly
- Successor: Francis Peter Leipzig

Orders
- Ordination: December 21, 1895 by Édouard-Charles Fabre
- Consecration: March 25, 1919 by Edward John O'Dea

Personal details
- Born: March 1, 1871 Kilmacow, County Kilkenny, Ireland
- Died: April 12, 1950 (aged 79) Baker City, Oregon, U.S.

Joseph Francis McGrath (March 1, 1871 – April 12, 1950) was an Irish-born American prelate of the Catholic Church. He served as bishop of the Diocese of Baker City in Oregon from 1919 until his death in 1950.

== Biography ==
=== Early life and education ===
Joseph McGrath was born on March 1, 1871, in Kilmacow, County Kilkenny, to James and Margaret (née O'Farrell) McGrath. He was confirmed by Francis Moran, then Bishop of Ossory and later the cardinal archbishop of Sydney. After completing his classical education, he studied philosophy at St Kieran's College, Kilkenny.

McGrath was sponsored to study for the priesthood for the Diocese of Springfield in Massachusetts by Bishop Patrick Thomas O'Reilly, who sent McGrath to complete his theological studies at the Grand Séminaire in Montreal.

=== Priesthood ===
While in Montreal, McGrath was ordained a priest for the Diocese of Springfield in Massachusetts on December 21, 1895, by Archbishop Édouard-Charles Fabre. Following his ordination, the diocese assigned McGrath as assistant pastor at St. Thomas Parish in Adams, Massachusetts. However, by 1900, the Diocese of Springfield had more priests than parishes, with 224 priests but only 111 parishes. The Diocese of Springfield therefore loaned McGrath to the Diocese of Portland in Maine. This diocese assigned McGrath as an assistant pastor at St. Joseph Parish in Old Town, Maine. He also performed missionary work among Native Americans on the Penobscot Indian Island Reservation in Maine.

Facing poor health, McGrath sought a warmer climate. After spending a few months in San Antonio, Texas, he travelled to Washington State. Once there, he met Bishop Edward John O'Dea, who needed more English-speaking priests in the Diocese of Seattle. After McGrath decided to work in the diocese, O'Dean appointed him as an assistant pastor at St. James Cathedral Parish in Seattle in 1904.

After two years at the cathedral, McGrath was appointed pastor of St. Patrick Parish in Tacoma, Washington, in 1906. A fire had destroyed the church in 1905 and he immediately began construction on a new church. The cornerstone was laid in March 1906 and the building was dedicated in June 1907. In addition to his pastoral duties, McGrath was named a diocesan consultor in 1910 and dean of the counties of Pierce, Thurston, and Grays Harbor in 1915.

=== Bishop of Baker City ===
In July 1918, Pope Benedict XV named Reverend Terrence G. Brady from the Archdiocese of Dubuque as the next bishop of Baken City to succeed Bishop Charles Joseph O'Reilly. However, Brady declined the appointment and the pope instead named McGrath as bishop on December 21, 1918.

McGrath received his episcopal consecration on March 25, 1919, from Bishop O'Dea, with Bishops Mathias Clement Lenihan and John Patrick Carroll serving as co-consecrators, at St. James Cathedral. He took formal charge of the Diocese of Baker City on April 1, 1919, when he was installed at St. Francis de Sales Cathedral in Baker.

During McGrath's 31-year tenure in Baker City, the Catholic population increased from 6,755 to 14,729 and the number of priests increased from 26 to 39; however, the total number of churches (including parishes and missions) fell from 54 to 50. With only one parochial school in the entire diocese at the beginning of his tenure, McGrath mandated that the Confraternity of Christian Doctrine be established in every parish and mission.

In 1948, the 77-year-old McGrath received Leo Fabian Fahey as a coadjutor bishop to assist and eventually succeed him. However, before he could replace McGrath, Fahey fell ill and died on March 31, 1950. Less than two weeks later, McGrath himself died in Baker City on April 12, 1950.

Catholic Church titles
Preceded by Charles Joseph O'Reilly	Bishop of Baker City; 1919—1950	Succeeded by Francis Peter Leipzig
