= SCMC =

SCMC may refer to:

- Shanghai Children's Medical Center, a Chinese hospital associated with Shanghai Jiao Tong University
- Southern Congregational Methodist Church, a Christian denomination in the southeastern United States
- St. Charles Medical Center (Bend, Oregon), a hospital in Bend, Oregon owned by Cascade Healthcare Community, Inc.
- St. Charles Medical Center – Redmond, a hospital in Redmond, Oregon owned by Cascade Healthcare Community, Inc.
- Strengthening Church Members Committee, a group within The Church of Jesus Christ of Latter-day Saints which monitors criticism from church members
- Sodium carboxymethyl cellulose, a lubricant used in horses
- Synchronous computer-mediated communication, real-time communication over a computer network
