= Thomas J. Hennen =

Thomas J. Hennen may refer to:

- Thomas J. Hennen (astronaut)
- Thomas J. Hennen (bishop)
