= St. Charles Medical Center – Madras =

St. Charles Madras
- St. Charles Health System

Geography
- Location: Madras, Oregon, United States
- Coordinates: 44.638°N 121.121°W

Organization
- Type: Community
- Affiliated university: None

Services
- Emergency department: Level IV trauma center
- Beds: 25 (licensed for 36)

History
- Opened: 1967

Links
- Website: St. Charles Madras
- Lists: Hospitals in Oregon

St. Charles Madras is a non-profit medical center located in Madras, Oregon, United States. Founded in 1967 as Mountain View Hospital, the level IV trauma center has 25 beds. It is the only hospital in Jefferson County and joined the St. Charles Health System in 2013.

== History ==
Mountain View Hospital opened in 1967 as the lone hospital of the Mountain View Hospital District. Land for the facility was donated by the Bean Foundation. The St. Charles Health System began providing administrative services to the hospital in 1998. In 2010, the hospital announced plans for a $36 million remodel and expansion to the then 80,000-square-foot (7,400 m^{2}) facility to be completed in 2012 without an increase in hospital beds. Plans called for a new main building of 60,000 square feet (5,600 m^{2}) to house patient beds, the emergency department, radiology, and other care facilities, while the existing space would be converted to administrative and office facilities. However, the expansion never materialized due to a lack of finances.

Instead, the hospital district sought to merge with the larger St. Charles Health System in July 2012. A deal was reached in October 2012 to merge the hospital, and the merger was completed in January 2013 with the hospital becoming St. Charles – Madras.

== Operations ==
St. Charles – Madras has 36 licensed beds, but only has 25 available, and is the only hospital in Jefferson County. The acute care facility is a level four trauma center and serves the entire county, plus portions of neighboring Wasco County and the Warm Springs Indian Reservation. The state of Oregon classifies the hospital as a Type B Rural hospital and as a critical access facility.

Services at the facility include maternity, surgery, radiology, an intensive care unit, and emergency services, among others. For 2012, the hospital had a total of 814 discharges, with 3,113 patient days, and 10,737 emergency department visits. Also that year were 155 births and 172 inpatient surgeries.

== See also ==
- St. Charles Medical Center – Redmond
- St. Charles Medical Center – Bend
