= 2020 University of Illinois Hospital strikes =

2020 labor strikes in Chicago, Illinois

- Date: September 12–24, 2020 (12 days)
- Location: Chicago, Illinois, United States
- Goals: Increased nurse to patient ratio; Increased access to personal protective equipment (PPE); Increased pay, including a $15 per hour system-wide minimum wage
- Methods: Strike action; Picketing; Walkout
- Result: New labor contracts with provisions that included: Wage increases, including $15 per hour minimum wage at the Chicago campus; Increased access to PPE; Protections against outsourcing

Parties
University of Illinois Hospital	Illinois Nurses Association; Service Employees International Union (SEIU) Local 73

The 2020 University of Illinois Hospital strikes were the result of a breakdown in contract negotiations between labor unions and hospital management over salaries, staffing levels, and access to personal protective equipment.

The background for both strikes stemmed from negotiations over labor contracts between the Chicago-based hospital and two unions, the Illinois Nurses Association (INA) and Local 73 of the Service Employees International Union (SEIU). The unions had been negotiating for new contracts for several months and had held over 70 bargaining sessions with hospital management, but despite this, no agreement could be concluded between the parties. In mid-September, both unions declared their intent to strike, citing unfair labor practices. The INA strike started on September 12, with Local 73's strike commencing on September 14. These were the first strikes at the University of Illinois Hospital in 46 years. Both strikes involved several hundred workers from each union, though court rulings limited the total number of union members allowed to strike by several hundred. Goals shared by both unions included increased staffing, increased pay, and greater access to personal protective equipment during the COVID-19 pandemic.

On September 19, the INA announced an end to their strike, stating that progress had been made towards new contract agreements. On September 23, the SEIU came to a tentative agreement on a new contract, with their strike ending the following day. That same day, the INA announced a tentative agreement with the hospital. In early October, membership of both unions voted to accept the new contracts.

== Background ==
=== Illinois Nurses Association ===
On August 24, 2020, a three-year labor contract between the Illinois Nurses Association (INA) and the University of Illinois Hospital (UIH) in Chicago was set to expire. In the leadup to the expiration, over 20 bargaining sessions were held between the union and hospital regarding a replacement. A deal between the two groups was not reached by August 24, and subsequently the contract was extended to September 7. The biggest issue regarding the negotiations pertained to nurse-to-patient ratios, with union representatives demanding limits to the total number of patients a single nurse must be responsible for. Additional issues were related to higher pay and the availability of personal protective equipment (PPE) during the COVID-19 pandemic. A September 2020 article in the Chicago Sun-Times reported that approximately 270 UIH workers had contracted COVID-19 by that time, with In These Times reporting that at least four UIH workers had died from the virus. Multiple sources reported that the hospital was resistant to changing policy on nurse-to-patient ratios, arguing that having set ratios does not work. However, the president of the INA refuted this, stating, "We have two decades of research to support that having adequate nurses at the bedside, will prevent falls, will prevent infections, will prevent deaths, in a hospital mind you."

On August 19, INA members at UIH voted for a seven-day strike, with 995 nurses in favor and 12 against. On September 2, citing unfair labor practices, they filed a notice ten days in advance of their intent to strike on September 12. At the time of the announcement, the INA released a statement saying, "Barring a breakthrough in negotiations between nurses and the University of Illinois Hospital, more than 1,300 nurses will begin a seven-day strike at 7 a.m. on Saturday, September 12th". On September 8, the board of trustees for the University of Illinois system filed a lawsuit with the Circuit Court of Cook County to prevent the strike from occurring, claiming that, because of the important services provided by the hospital, the strike "would constitute a clear and present danger to the health or safety of the public." While the judge did not prevent the strike from occurring, on September 11 (the day before the strike was scheduled to commence), a temporary restraining order was granted against some select nurses, preventing them from striking. The ruling barred 525 nurses who worked in intensive care units out of concern that it would jeopardize the safety of the patients there. As a result, while initial estimates stated that 1,300 or 1,400 nurses would go on strike, the actual number of strikers was estimated at over 800. That same day, union representatives and hospital officials engaged in a 14-hour long bargaining session which ended at an impasse.

=== Service Employees International Union ===
Around the same time that issues between the INA and UIH were coming to a head, the hospital was undergoing contract negotiations with Local 73 of the Service Employees International Union (SEIU), which included many clerical, maintenance, and technical workers for the hospital. An article published by the Chicago Sun-Times in late September claimed that the SEIU and hospital had participated in over 50 bargaining sessions over the course of several months at that point. On September 3, citing unfair labor practices, SEIU Local 73 submitted a notice ten days in advance of their intent to strike. The notice came after the union reported that 94% of the workers voted to approve a strike action. At the time of the announcement, Local 73 members had been working without a contract for about a year. According to the union, their demands included instituting a base pay of $15 per hour, increasing the availabilities of masks and N95s, and protections against outsourcing, among other issues. As with the INA, the hospital attempted to block strike action from occurring, and on September 11, a restraining order, similar to the one for the INA, prevented approximately 300 SEIU members in critical care operations from participating.

== Course of the strikes ==
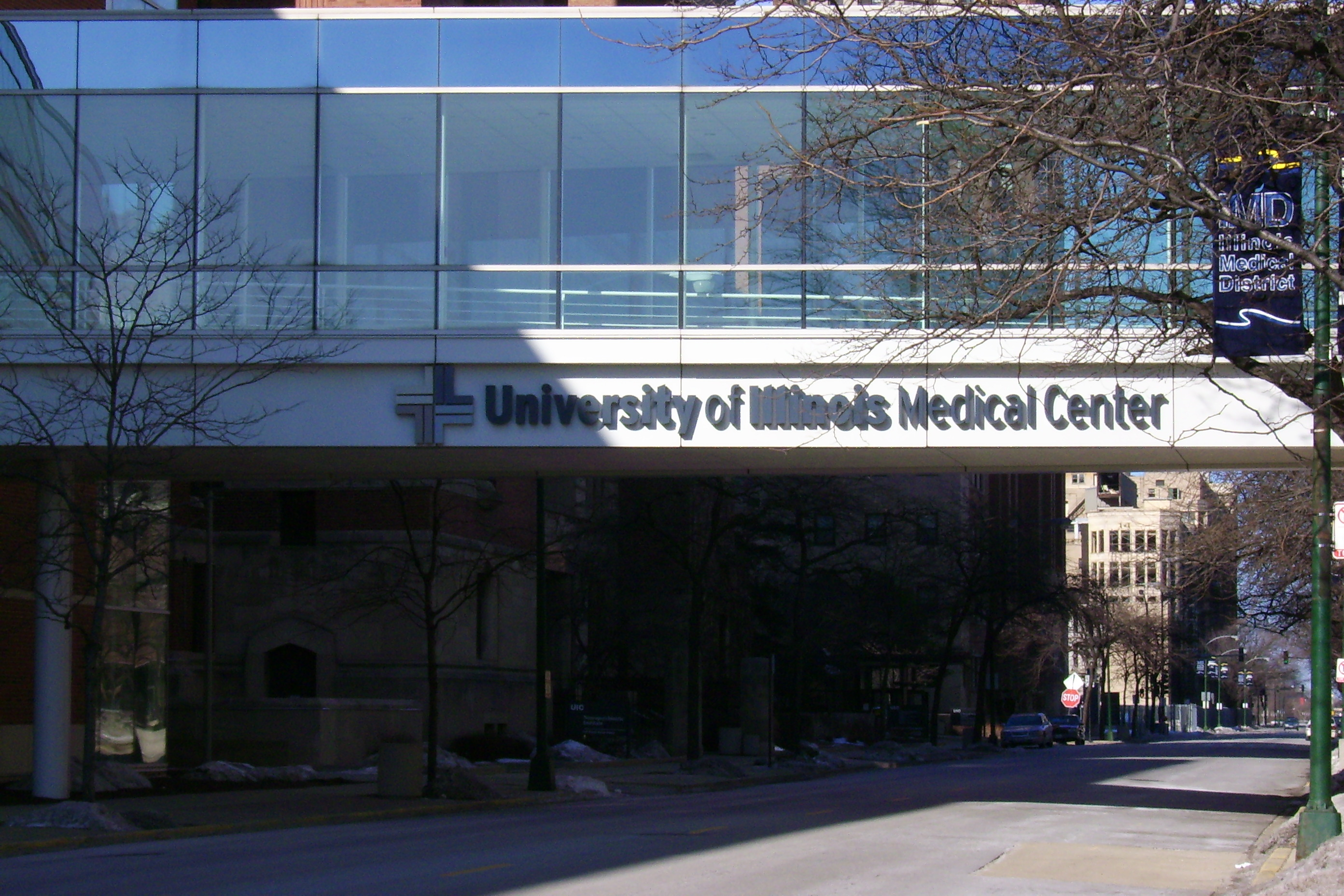
University of Illinois Medical Center

The strike began on September 12, with 800 nurses walking out. It was the first walkout the UIH had experienced in 46 years. Starting at 7 a.m., strikers joined a picket line outside the hospital in the Near West Side, with U.S. Representative Jesús "Chuy" García showing support for the strikers by wearing a blue polo shirt and a University of Illinois at Chicago alumni hat. Despite unfavorable weather conditions, the picketing lasted until 10 p.m. That same day, in a story aired by WLS-TV, union officials accused UIC of preparing to bring in strikebreakers. On September 14, at 6 a.m., members of the SEIU Local 73 went on strike. 1,700 members were from the UIH in Chicago, while a total of approximately 3,800 SEIU members went on strike at UIH facilities in Champaign, Chicago, Peoria, and Rockford. An article in Labor Notes published several days later stated that the Local 73 strike was timed to coincide with the INA strike, and a representative for Local 73 expressed delight in "standing in solidarity" with the INA strikers. At a joint rally that same day, political activist Jesse Jackson spoke in support of the strikers, and the next morning, he joined the picket lines. Later that day, negotiations resumed between INA and hospital representatives. On September 18, strikers marched in Downtown Chicago from Millennium Park to the Illinois Governor's offices at the James R. Thompson Center to call on support from Governor J. B. Pritzker. Additional protesting continued in the Illinois Medical District.

On September 19, after several days of striking, the INA ended their strike action, with nurses returning to work that day. According to INA representatives, union and hospital officials had been meeting every evening for the previous week in an attempt to come to an agreement. However, at the time of the strike's end, there was no contract agreement reached between UIH and the INA. Despite this, INA officials claimed they were confident in coming to an agreement with the hospital and cited achievements in the negotiations, such as the hospital claiming they would provide more PPE for nurses and hire an additional 200 nurses to improve nurse-patient ratios.

On September 23, the SEIU and hospital came to a tentative agreement on a new labor contract. Agreements between the hospital and SEIU included protections against outsourcing, increased PPE, and a $15 hourly minimum wage for all workers in Chicago. SEIU officials called the strike off the following day. That same day, the INA and hospital officials reached a tentative agreement on a new labor contract. Provisions of the new contract included hazard pay during the COVID-19 pandemic, hiring an additional 160 nurses to help with staffing, and guarantees to providing more PPE. Additionally, nurses would receive a 1% annual wage increase that would rise to 2% after four years. Union members were expected to begin voting on the contract on September 28. By October 1, the contract had been approved by INA members, with a vote of 842 to 13. On October 6, SEIU announced that a majority of their members had approved their new contract with UIH. Both new labor contracts are for four-year terms, with the INA deal running from 2020 to 2024 and the Local 73 deal running from the date of their previous contract's expiration in 2019 to 2023. In total, both unions and the hospital expressed satisfaction with the agreements that had been reached, with Local 73 calling the strike a "victory".

== See also ==
- COVID-19 pandemic in Illinois
- Impact of the COVID-19 pandemic on healthcare workers
- Impact of the COVID-19 pandemic on hospitals
- Strikes during the COVID-19 pandemic
