= Robert F. Vasa =

American Catholic bishop (born 1951)

His Excellency, The Most Reverend Robert Francis Vasa
- Bishop of Santa Rosa
- Archdiocese: San Francisco
- Diocese: Santa Rosa
- Appointed: January 24, 2011
- Installed: June 30, 2011
- Predecessor: Daniel F. Walsh
- Previous post: Bishop of Baker (2000-2011)

Orders
- Ordination: May 22, 1976 by Glennon Patrick Flavin
- Consecration: January 26, 2000 by John George Vlazny, Thomas Joseph Connolly, and Fabian Bruskewitz

Personal details
- Born: May 7, 1951 (age 75) Lincoln, Nebraska, US
- Education: Holy Trinity Seminary; Pontifical Gregorian University
- Motto: Unless a grain of wheat

Styles of Robert Francis Vasa
- Reference style: His Excellency; The Most Reverend
- Spoken style: Your Excellency
- Religious style: Bishop

Robert Francis Vasa (born May 7, 1951) is an American prelate of the Roman Catholic Church. On Monday, January 24, 2011, Vasa was named the coadjutor bishop to Bishop Daniel F. Walsh of the Diocese of Santa Rosa in California by Pope Benedict XVI. Until then, he had been the fifth bishop of the Diocese of Baker in Oregon. On June 30, 2011, Walsh's resignation was accepted by Benedict XVI and Vasa succeeded him as bishop.

== Early life ==
Robert Vasa was born on May 7, 1951, in Lincoln, Nebraska, to Joe and Leona Vasa. Having decided to become a priest, Vasa in 1972 entered Holy Trinity Seminary in Dallas, Texas. He graduated in 1976 with a Master of Divinity degree.

== Priesthood ==
Vasa was ordained to the priesthood for the Diocese of Lincoln by Bishop Glennon Flavin on May 22, 1976, at the Cathedral of the Risen Christ in Lincoln. After his 1976 ordination, the diocese assigned Vasa served as an assistant pastor at the Risen Christ Parish. He also started teaching at Pius X High School in Lincoln. The diocese in 1977 moved Vasa to a posting as an advocate on the diocesan marriage tribunal.In 1979, Vasa traveled to Rome to study at the Pontifical Gregorian University. He was awarded a Licentiate of Canon Law in 1981.

Following Vasa's return to Nebraska in 1981, Flavin appointed him as assistant chancellor of the diocese and afterwards father prior of the local Columbian Squires chapter. Four years later, he was named judicial vicar and pastor of St. James Parish in Cortland, Nebraska . Vasa was appointed vice chancellor in 1987 and in 1988 directed the remodeling and fund drive for St. Stephen Parish in Exeter, Nebraska.

In addition to his duties as judicial vicar, Vasa was appointed pastor of St. Peter Parish in Lincoln in 1990. He was raised by the Vatican to the rank of honorary prelate in 1995. In 1996, Bishop Fabian Bruskewitz appointed Vasa was named vicar general of the diocese and moderator of the curia. He became chair of the diocesan Building Commission in 1996 and served as pastor of St. Michael Parish in Cheney, Nebraska, from 1997 to 1999.

== Bishop of Baker ==
On November 19, 1999, Vasa was named the fifth bishop of Baker by Pope John Paul II. He received his episcopal consecration at the Three Sisters Convention Center in Redmond, Oregon, on January 26, 2000, from Archbishop John Vlazny, with Bishops Thomas Connolly and Fabian Bruskewitz serving as co-consecrators.

According to a Catholic News Service article, Vasa stated in February 2010 that St. Charles Medical Center in Bend, Oregon, located within the diocese, had "gradually moved away" from the church's ethical directives and could no longer be called Catholic. As a result, mass could not be celebrated in the hospital chapel and the hospital was forced to return all Catholic religious items to the diocese. However, the hospital retained the St. Charles name and the cross on his facility.

== Bishop of Santa Rosa ==
On January 24, 2011, Pope Benedict XVI appointed Vasa as coadjutor bishop of Santa Rosa. Vasa was installed on March 6, 2011. On June 30, 2011, he succeeded Bishop Walsh.Vasa served as the episcopal advisor to the Catholic Medical Association until 2014. He currently serves that role for the online religious education provider, CatechismClass.

On July 22, 2019, Vasa suspended Reverend Oscar Diaz, the pastor of Resurrection Parish in Santa Rosa, California, from ministry. Diaz had admitted to stealing $95,000 from the parish. While local prosecutors declined to press criminal charges, Vasa said that he would never allow Diaz to work as a priest again. In December 2022, Vasa announced that the diocese would seek Chapter 11 bankruptcy protection in order to deal with a large volume of sexual abuse lawsuits against the clergy. In March 2023, the diocese filed its bankruptcy petition.

== See also ==
- Catholic Church hierarchy
- Catholic Church in the United States
- Historical list of the Catholic bishops of the United States
- List of Catholic bishops of the United States
- Lists of patriarchs, archbishops, and bishops

== Episcopal succession ==
Catholic Church titles
Preceded by Daniel F. Walsh	Bishop of Santa Rosa; 2011–current	Incumbent
Preceded by Thomas Joseph Connolly	Bishop of Baker; 1999–2011	Succeeded by Liam Stephen Cary
