= Thomas Joseph Connolly =

Catholic bishop (1922–2015)

His Excellency, The Most Reverend Thomas Joseph Connolly
- Bishop of Baker
- Church: Roman Catholic Church
- See: Diocese of Baker
- In office: May 4, 1971 to November 19, 1999
- Predecessor: Francis Peter Leipzig
- Successor: Robert F. Vasa

Orders
- Ordination: April 8, 1947 by Thomas Kiely Gorman
- Consecration: June 30, 1971 by Robert Joseph Dwyer

Personal details
- Born: July 18, 1922 Tonopah, Nevada, US
- Died: April 24, 2015 (aged 92) Beaverton, Oregon, US
- Education: St. Joseph Preparatory Seminary; St. Patrick Seminary; Catholic University of America; Pontifical Lateran University
- Motto: I am spent and will be spent for you

Thomas Joseph Connolly (July 18, 1922 – April 24, 2015) was an American prelate of the Catholic Church. He served as bishop of the Diocese of Baker in Oregon from 1971 to 1999.

== Biography ==
=== Early life ===
Connolly was born on July 18, 1922, in Tonopah, Nevada, to John and Katherine (née Hammel) Connolly. He completed his studies for the priesthood in California, first at St. Joseph Preparatory Seminary in Mountain View and then at St. Patrick Seminary in Menlo Park.

=== Priesthood ===
Connolly was ordained a priest at St. Patrick's Church in Tonopah for the Diocese of Reno by Bishop Thomas Gorman on April 8, 1947. His first assignments were as a curate at St. Thomas Aquinas Cathedral Parish and at St. Therese of the Little Flower Parish, both in Reno, Nevada. He also taught at Bishop Manogue High School in Reno and serving as chaplain to the local Serra Club.

Connolly served as private secretary to Gorman from 1948 until 1949, when he was sent to study canon law at the Catholic University of America in Washington, D.C. He earned a Licentiate of Canon Law in 1951, and a doctorate from the Pontifical Lateran University in Rome in 1952. Following his return to Reno, Connolly was assigned as an assistant pastor at St. Thomas Aquinas Cathedral. After serving at St. Joseph Parish in Elko, Nevada, and St. Albert the Great Church in Reno, he became pastor in 1968 of St. Teresa of Avila Parish in Carson City, Nevada.

=== Bishop of Baker ===
On May 4, 1971, Connolly was appointed bishop of Baker by Pope Paul VI. He received his episcopal ordination on June 30, 1971, at Saint Francis de Sales Cathedral in Baker, Oregon, from Archbishop Robert Dwyer, with Bishops Gorman and Michael Green serving as co-consecrators.

In accord with the reforms of the Second Vatican Council in Rome, Connolly established a priests' council, an annual presbyteral assembly, a sisters' council, and a diocesan pastoral council with lay participation. He oversaw a large-scale renovation of St. Francis de Sales Cathedral in the early 1980s. He also scheduled regular Spanish-language masses, established a program to assist undocumented immigrants in applying for American citizenship, and ordained the first class of permanent deacons for the diocese.

=== Retirement and legacy ===
Upon reaching the mandatory retirement age of 75, Connolly submitted his letter of resignation to Pope John Paul II in July 1997. His resignation was accepted on November 19, 1999, and Reverend Robert F. Vasa of the Diocese of Lincoln was named as his successor. Thomas Connolly died in Beaverton, Oregon, in April 2015, at age 92.

Catholic Church titles
Preceded by Francis Peter Leipzig	Bishop of Baker; 1971–1999	Succeeded by Robert F. Vasa
