= St. Charles Health System =

- Company type: not-for-profit healthcare, not-for-profit hospitals
- Industry: Healthcare
- Headquarters: Bend, Oregon
- Website: stcharleshealthcare.org

St. Charles Health System, Inc. (SCHS) is a four-hospital network and healthcare company in Central Oregon. Headquartered in Bend, the system owns and operates the St. Charles medical centers in Bend, Redmond, Madras, and Prineville. SCHS is a private, non-profit Oregon corporation and with more than 3,000 employees. It is the largest employer in the region.

== History ==
The first Hospital in Bend named St. Charles was built in 1922 on "Hospital Hill" located in downtown Bend. The building was named in honor of Bishop Charles Joseph O'Reilly, the first bishop of the Roman Catholic Diocese of Baker. This building was to replace a house at 930 Broadway that the Sisters of St. Joseph of Tipton, Indiana were using for medical facilities.

In 1951 a more modern facility was built on the Hospital Hill site.

In 1972 the Sisters of St. Joseph transferred the assets of the hospital to a new not for profit corporation called St. Charles Memorial Hospital Inc.

On October 12, 1975, the new St. Charles Medical Center was dedicated. In March 1977 the old St. Charles Memorial Hospital building was demolished.

on January 1, 2001, Central Oregon District Hospital and St. Charles Medical Center merged to create Cascade Healthcare Services, later renamed to Cascade Healthcare Community, inc. As part of the merger the hospital was renamed to Central Oregon Community Hospital. In 2003 the hospital's name was changed again to the current St. Charles Medical Center Redmond.

On February 15, 2010, the Catholic Diocese of Baker announced its intention to dissolve the official sponsorship relationship of St. Charles Medical Center-Bend by the Catholic Church. As part of the announcement both the Church and CHC said "very little will change at St. Charles Bend as a result of this decision. However, Catholic Mass will no longer be celebrated in the hospital's chapel, and all items considered Catholic will be removed from the hospital and returned to the church." The dissolution of the Church's sponsorship ended a 92-year relationship.

== See also ==
- St. Charles Medical Center - Bend
- St. Charles Medical Center Heliport
- List of hospitals in Oregon
