= Strikes during the COVID-19 pandemic =

Industrial action relating to the emergency

Strikes occurred during the COVID-19 pandemic due to many factors including: hazard pay or low pay, unsafe working conditions (due to poor social distancing or a lack of personal protective equipment), inability to pay rent. These strikes are separate from the various protests that occurred over responses to the pandemic.

== Overview of strikes ==
The COVID-19 pandemic in the United States has led to the highest number of total infections and deaths of any country, although per capita it is not the highest. The pandemic caused the unemployment rate to temporarily rise from roughly 2 percent to nearly 18 percent of the workforce, higher than the Great Recession of 2008, but lower than the peak of the Great Depression in 1933. Many employers for non-essential work shifted to teleworking to avoid infections in office environments at the suggestion of the Center for Disease Control (CDC) and by the end of March 2020, all 50 states in the U.S. had confirmed cases and deaths and had initiated stay-at-home orders. As a result of the high unemployment rates and social injustices that were laid bare during the pandemic, people began to strike for various reasons including rent strikes, prison strikes, university strikes, and worker strikes.

== Prison system strikes ==
During the COVID-19 pandemic an array of social inequalities were exposed including the flaws of the prison system in the US that faltered under the public health emergency. As a result of mass incarceration in the US and unhealthy living conditions within the prisons, the incarcerated population is five times more likely to contract the COVID-19 virus. At least 392,595 incarcerated people have tested positive for COVID-19 and at least 2,516 people in prison have died from complications related to the virus. The US has the highest incarceration rate in the world, and often has crowded and unsanitary conditions causing difficulty in following CDC guidelines such as social distancing and hand sanitizing as hand sanitizers are often banned or limited in correctional facilities. In response to the rising cases and crowded conditions, thousands of inmates were released; however, strikes continued to emerge as inmates protest their living conditions.

A hunger strike occurred at York County Prison in Pennsylvania. Another hunger strike happened in Otay Mesa, San Diego, California on 17 April 2020 at the Otay Mesa Detention Center.

Additionally detainees of the US Immigration and Customs Enforcement (ICE) have begun to strike in protest of unsafe and over-crowded conditions in ICE facilities. 60 women being held at an ICE facility Northwest Detention Center in Tacoma, Washington organized a hunger strike demanding the release of all vulnerable people. Detained immigrants across three ICE facilities in New Jersey organized a hunger strike with 86 people being held in an ICE facility in Newark, New Jersey hunger striking and demanding their release given the inability to curb the spread of COVID-19 within the facility. Responses to these hunger strikes in some cases have been violent with ICE officers using pepper spray on a group of Cuban asylum seekers in New Mexico after they organized a hunger strike.

== Rent strikes ==
=== United States ===
On 1 April 2020, 32 residential tenants in Chicago went on strike. One Los Angeles landlord, while trying to prevent a rent strike by emailing 300 tenants that they owed rent, inadvertently caused one by cc'ing, and not bcc'ing those tenants on the list who used the contact information to coordinate a strike. A solitary renter in Colorado went on strike. A group of at least 20 tenants went on strike in Oakland, California. Almost a dozen renters in Austin, Texas went on rent strike in one building.

According to the National Multifamily Housing Council, 69 percent of American renters were on time with rent by 5 April 2020, as compared to 81 percent in March 2020. On 8 April, 13 Philadelphia households went on rent strike. In May 2020 thousands of New York City tenants declined to pay rent in a rent strike.

=== Companies ===
Many commercial tenants, notably retailers, have called the situation a "force majeure" as rationale for voiding lease agreements, although landlords still have to make mortgage payments. These include Cheesecake Factory, Mattress Firm and Subway refused to pay April 2020 rent due to the pandemic, and resulting unemployment.

=== Organizations ===
Rent Strike 2020 was an activist organization that was formed during the 2020 pandemic to promote widespread rent strikes. In Chicago, the Autonomous Tenant's Union has been advocating rent freezes as well as mortgage freezes and utility freezes. A group of 100 renters in Kent, Ohio formed the Kent Tenants Union, which created a list of demands to pay rent.

The International Alliance of Inhabitants is a network of grassroots organizations. It established the International Tribunal on Evictions which held sessions and collaborates with the UN Rapporteur on the Right to Housing.

=== Other Countries ===
==== Australia ====
A petition organized by the Kulin Nations (Melbourne) branch of the Industrial Workers of the World recorded nearly 20,000 signatures on its page. This prompted the organization of rent strike support groups in preparation for 31 March, when renters from multiple Council areas sent letters of demand to real estate companies and landlords stating their intention to cease paying rent beginning in April. Initial organization came before announcement of a moratorium on evictions for six months by the Australian Federal government, and continued afterwards.

==== United Kingdom ====
In the UK all eviction proceedings were suspended, and a three-month, extendable, moratorium on new proceedings was imposed. In addition household assistance of various forms was made available to domestic tenants, and support for landlords was extended via the banks. However, students at the University of the West of England and Bristol University went on a rent strike against many landlords who continued to charge them full priced rent. Students at the University of Manchester launched a rent strike and occupation in November 2020, calling for a 40 percent rent reduction for the duration of the 2020/21 academic year, for the option of ending their tenancies early without penalty, and for additional help for self-isolating students. In response to the rent strike the university cut rent by 30 percent for all students in university halls of residence. Rent strikes were also announced in Autumn 2020 at the University of Glasgow, which resulted in a one-month rent rebate.

== University strikes ==
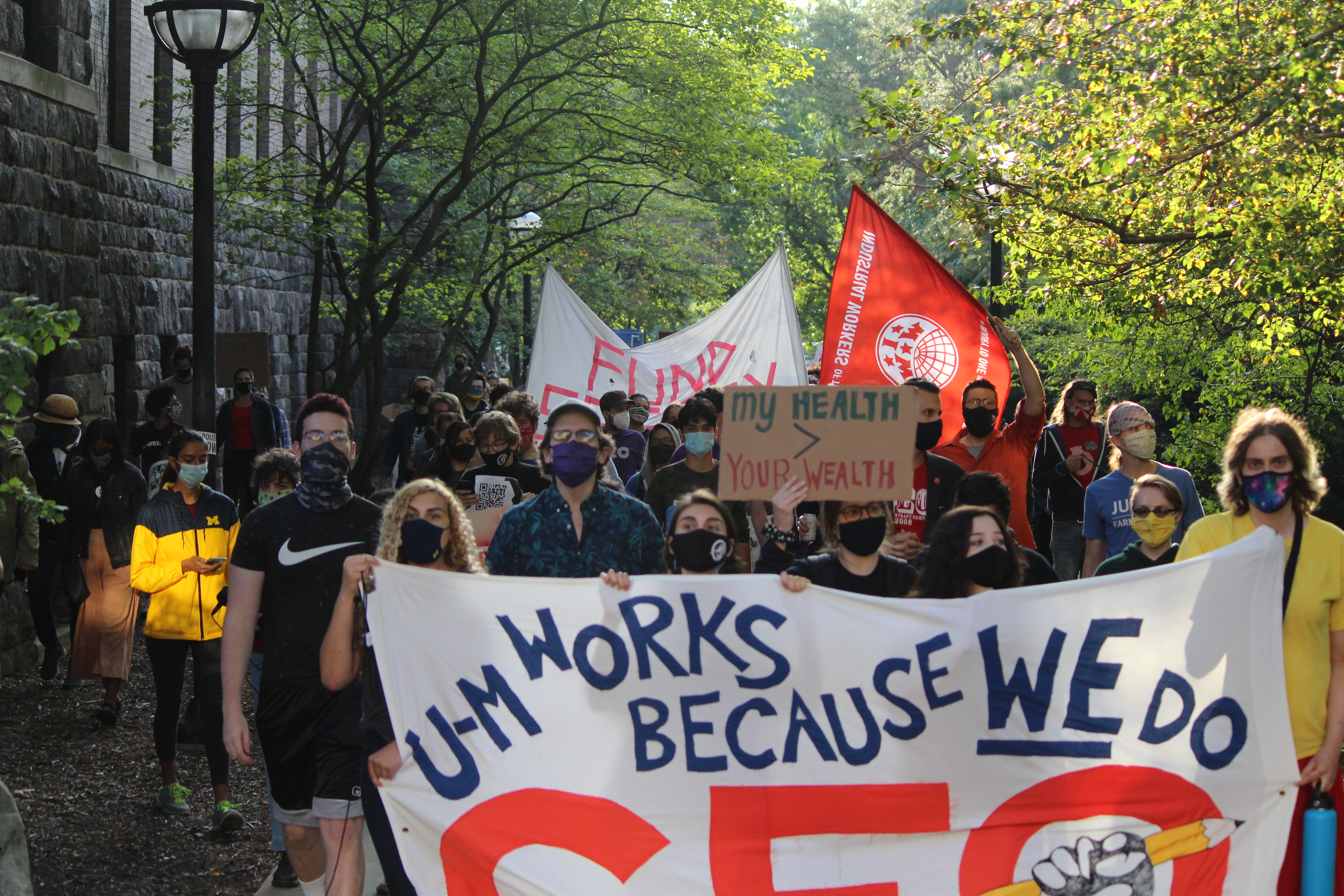
Protesting during the 2020 Michigan graduate students strike

=== University strikes in the US ===
Students at the University of Chicago went on a tuition strike and similar strikes were seen at Pomona College, The New School, and Columbia University. Students at Vassar College in Poughkeepsie went on a strike from classes after the university refused to implement a Universal Pass system for the classes during the pandemic. PhD students at Columbia University went on strike stating that their rent should be canceled, research stipends increased, and an extra year added to their programs to make up for lost time due to the pandemic.

On 8 September, the graduate students' union at the University of Michigan declared a strike over concerns regarding their school's reopening plans. The strike ended on 17 September following an agreement between the union and the university.

On 15 March 2021, members of the Graduate Workers of Columbia–United Auto Workers began a strike at Columbia University over issues of union recognition and failures to agree to a labor contract.

=== University strikes in other countries ===
Students at the Universidad de Chile and Universidad San Sebastián in Chile, went on an online strike in support for the many students who do not own a computer or constant access to the Internet for online learning. The 2018–2021 UK higher education strikes by university staff overlapped with the pandemic, though they originated beforehand.

On 19 October, the 1,300 University of Ottawa Support Staff members started a strike, following 19 months of unsuccessful negotiations, over cuts in Health Benefits, limited salary increases due to Ontario's Bill 124, cuts in parental leave and new retirement plan limitations. Due to COVID-19 gathering limitations, employees on strike had to use their creativity to develop different virtual picketing techniques to raise awareness.

== Workers strikes ==
=== Overview of 2020 United States essential workers general strike ===
Despite warnings from the CDC, jobs deemed "essential" for the function of society required employees to report to work amidst the pandemic. This included various healthcare, grocery and home supplies retail chains. Various workers at home supplies and grocery chains had initially complained that customers were not practicing social distancing recommendations, and that companies were not adequately providing the necessary equipment and financial security needed to minimize the risk of exposure to the virus, nor have enough of a safety net to stay home should they become infected with the virus.

On 1 May 2020, essential workers at Amazon, Instacart, Target, Walmart, and Whole Foods organized a nationwide strike over lack of safety precautions, hazard pay, and benefits during the coronavirus pandemic. The date of the strike correlated with International Workers' Day, an international day to celebrate and recognize organized labor. It was part of a wave of strikes during the COVID-19 pandemic. Several labor unions provided support to these strikes including the AFL–CIO, Target Workers Unite, UFCW, and the IWW.

Unions have said in numerous statements that the inadequate preparations by these companies to make employees safe has led to higher illnesses and deaths from COVID-19. The United Food and Commercial Workers union said 72 of its members have died and more than 5,000 are not at work due to circumstances surrounding COVID-19. Several labor unions provided support to these strikes including the AFL–CIO, Target Workers Unite, UFCW, and the IWW.

Several major gatherings pertaining to the strike occurred in Staten Island, near what many consider is the epicenter of the coronavirus pandemic in the United States. Additional cities where major strike action occurred included Los Angeles, and Richmond, Virginia.

Several high-profile politicians including Senator Bernie Sanders of Vermont and Kamala Harris of California expressed solidarity with the workers.

==== Amazon ====
Strikes occurred in mid-March 2020 in Italy, and late March through 1 May 2020 at various US Amazon locations.

In New York City, the Amazon worker who helped organize the walkout at the Staten Island Warehouse was soon fired and New York City mayor Bill De Blasio has ordered an investigation. Amazon executives had planned to smear the reputation of the organizer. Amazon workers near Milan, Italy held a strike in mid-March to protest hazardous working conditions. On 1 April 2020 Amazon warehouse workers in Michigan planned a strike over PPE protections for the coronavirus. Amazon workers have been tracking known cases of the coronavirus in the US and Europe on Reddit, due to a lack of transparency from upper management. Amazon workers again went on strike over safe working conditions on Monday 6 April in Staten Island.

A minority of workers at various Amazon, Target, Instacart, and Whole Foods shops joined coordinated walkouts or sick-outs on 1 May 2020, in what was called an "essential workers general strike."

Amazon spokesperson, Av Zammit said that despite these strikes, the company is still functioning and that business has not been impacted by the sickouts across the county. Zammit said on the sickouts "the fact is that today the overwhelming majority of our more than 840,000 employees around the world are at work as usual continuing to support getting people in their communities the items they need during these challenging times." Zammit also said that the company has undertaken intense procedures to keep the workplaces sanitized. Specifically, he stated that Amazon expects to spend more than $800 million in the first half of the year on COVID-19 safety measures, such as company-provided face masks, disinfectant wipes and hand sanitizer. Amazon also announced that it intends to spend its entire second quarter profit, approximately $4 billion, on safety equipment for workers.

On 22 December 2021, 2 Chicago-based Amazon facilities went on strike to demand better working conditions, the first ever multi-site strike at Amazon in the USA.

==== Target ====
Adam Ryan, a liaison in Virginia for Target Workers Unite stated that the demands for Target workers included sick time off, hazard pay, limited customer access, and a shift towards pick up only for items at stores. Despite the concessions the company has made, Ryan and workers for TWU have stated that these concessions are not enough given that employees were already promised raises, and the paid time off does not pertain to every employee.

In reaction to the strikes, and throughout the pandemic, Target announced that it intended to spend around $300 million on coronavirus-related expenses. This included higher wages, hazard pay, child care, paid sick leave for older and immunocompromised workers.

=== Bus drivers ===
On 17 March in Detroit, Michigan, bus drivers went on a wildcat strike over safety items like masks and cleaning of busses, and by the next day the drivers had all their demands granted. Bus drivers in Birmingham, Alabama also went on strike.

On 24 September, following disputes over labor contracts, workers for Metro Transit in Minneapolis–Saint Paul, Minnesota authorized strike action if talks continued to stall.

=== Distribution and logistics ===
In Australia, shift workers walked off the job at a Coles distribution centre in Victoria to demand more safety measures over COVID-19. The demands were proper provision and enforcement of social distancing measures and additional supplies of antibacterial wipes, and the strike was successful in securing these measures. Workers at a Barnes & Noble warehouse in New Jersey went on strike on 7 April after 9 workers tested positive for COVID-19.

In Memphis, Tennessee 200 workers at a Kroger warehouse went on strike after discovering that a colleague had tested positive.

=== Food processing ===
In late March 2020, 50 workers at a Purdue poultry processing plant in Kathleen, Georgia went on a wildcat strike over working conditions and hazard pay. On 27 April, employees walked out of the Pilgrim's Pride poultry processing plant in Cold Spring, Minnesota, in protest of how the firm is handling worker safety during the COVID-19 pandemic. On 28 April 50 workers at the Smithfield Foods' pork plant in Nebraska walked out when the heard the plant would not close after around forty-eight co-workers had tested positive for COVID-19. On 7 May, fruit packing workers at Allan Brothers, in Washington state, walked off the job and protested outside the plant, saying the company has been lax and inconsistent about COVID-19 prevention, and asking for hazard pay.

=== Grocery ===
Several dozen food packagers working for Linden Foods in Dungannon, Northern Ireland walked out of work due to safety conditions. Smaller number of workers walked out or called in sick at Instacart, and Whole Foods, as well as other locations.

=== Manufacturing ===
Workers at General Electric walked off the job demanding to re-tool the factories to make ventilators, which are in dire short supply due to the pandemic. Workers at a Fiat Chrysler factory in Warren, Michigan went on strike over hot water for washing.

Industrial Trade Unions in Lombardy, Italy have been threatening and organizing strikes over working conditions.

In January 2021, about 200 workers at an oil refinery in St. Paul Park, Minnesota went on strike.

=== Medical ===
Public sector doctors and nurses in Hong Kong went on strike for two weeks in late January and early February to protest against the Hong Kong government's refusal to close borders to contain the growing epidemic. Healthcare worker unions warned that the healthcare system would inevitably collapse unless strict border quarantine with Mainland China was enacted.

In Papua New Guinea, 4,000 nurses are expected to strike over hazardous working conditions. Doctors and nurses in public hospitals in Zimbabwe held a strike due to a lack of protective equipment. Sanitation workers in Pittsburgh, Pennsylvania and Medway, UK went on strike over protective equipment. Doctors in Hong Kong, Jalalabad, Jakarta and Islamabad all threatened strikes over a lack of protective equipment.

Starting on 12 September, several hundred registered nurses and other workers at the University of Illinois Hospital in Chicago participated in the 2020 University of Illinois Hospital strikes.

On 13 October, about 400 nurses from Backus Hospital in Connecticut went on strike.

Healthcare workers in Myanmar working on the country's COVID-19 response went on strike in protest of a military coup d'état, which inspired a nationwide protest and civil disobedience movement.

In March 2021, about 150 technical workers from St. Charles Medical Center – Bend in Bend, Oregon went on strike for over 10 days. That same month, nurses at Saint Vincent Hospital in Worcester, Massachusetts also went on strike.

=== Restaurants ===
Other strikes occurred at a McDonalds in San Jose California, where workers complained that they did not have enough soap to clean their hands, and 20 workers at a McDonalds in Cicero, Illinois went on strike over paid sick days required by Illinois law, the walkout lasted 30 minutes and won the workers the paid sick leave. Around 100 restaurant and retail employees in Durham and Raleigh, North Carolina went on a single day digital strike against unsafe working conditions and low pay and reduced hours. In April 2020, workers at 30 restaurants went on strike over safety conditions.

=== Retail ===
500 workers walked out of work at ASOS in the UK because the workers wanted to maintain social distancing.

=== Sanitation ===
In Kent, United Kingdom, bin collectors and street cleaners working for Medway Council's contractor, Norse Group, balloted unanimously to strike over a lack of protective clothing and unsafe conditions regarding the virus. The strikes were called off after a deal was reached.

In New Orleans, United States, city sanitation workers went on strike beginning on 5 May 2020.

=== Shipping ===
Wharf workers were stood down in the Port of Melbourne after they refused to unload cargo from a Chinese ship due to fears about coronavirus safety.

== Unrelated postponed strikes ==
In Italy, a planned airline transport strike unrelated to COVID-19 was postponed in February 2020.

== See also ==
- List of strikes
