= Diocese of Baker =

Latin Catholic jurisdiction in the US

Coordinates: 44°46′36″N 117°49′37″W

Diocese of Baker Dioecesis Bakeriensis
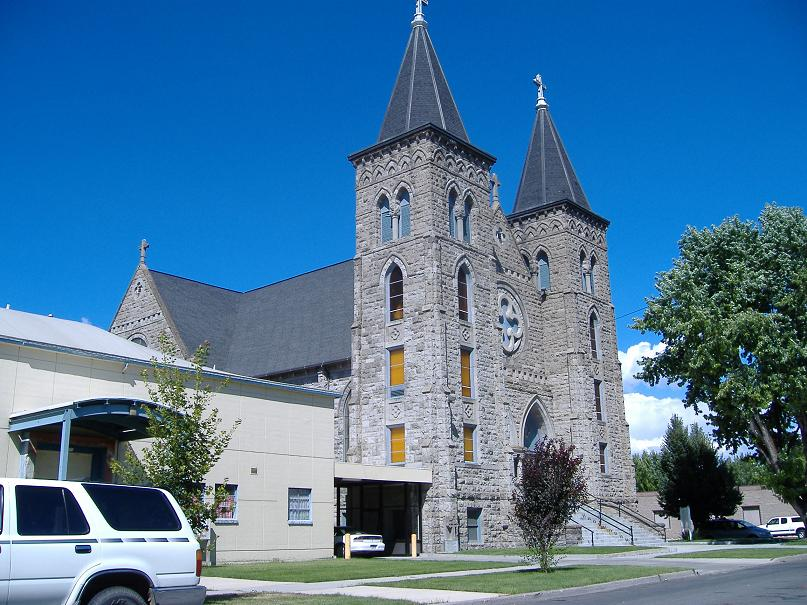
- St. Francis de Sales Cathedral

- Coat of Arms of the Diocese of Baker

Location
- Country: United States
- Territory: 18 counties in Eastern Oregon
- Ecclesiastical province: Province of Portland

Statistics
- Area: 173,013 km^{2} (66,801 sq mi)
- Population: Total; Catholics: (as of 2012); 509,474; 34,142 (6.7%)
- Parishes: 31

Information
- Denomination: Catholic
- Sui iuris church: Latin Church
- Rite: Roman Rite
- Established: June 19, 1903
- Cathedral: St. Francis de Sales Cathedral
- Patron saint: St. Francis de Sales

Current leadership
- Pope: Leo XIV
- Bishop: Thomas J. Hennen
- Metropolitan Archbishop: Alexander King Sample
- Bishops emeritus: Liam Stephen Cary

Map
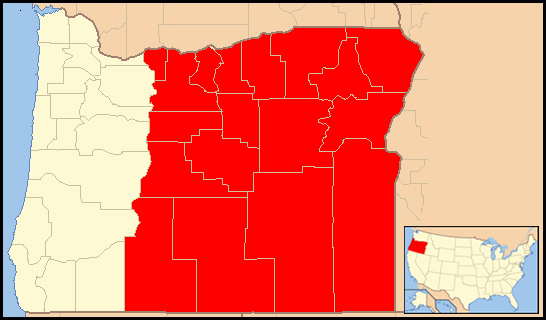

Website
- dioceseofbaker.org

The Diocese of Baker (Latin: Dioecesis Bakeriensis) is a diocese of the Catholic Church in Eastern Oregon in the United States. It is a suffragan diocese in the ecclesiastical province of the metropolitan Archdiocese of Portland. While Saint Francis de Sales Cathedral is located in Baker City, the pastoral offices are in Redmond. Thomas J. Hennen is the bishop.

== History ==
=== 1900 to 1950 ===
On June 19, 1903, Pope Leo XIII erected the Diocese of Baker City, taking its territory from the Diocese of Oregon City. He appointed Charles Joseph O'Reilly of Oregon City as the first bishop of the new diocese.

The new diocese consisted of more than 65,000 square miles east of the Cascade Mountains, which O'Reilly described as "terra incognita". Some sources said that Archbishop Christie would assign discontented priests to eastern Oregon to be rid of them. This observation seemed to be confirmed upon O'Reilly's arrival in Baker City, when he was greeted by four armed priests. When O'Reilly tried to reassign one of those priests, Louis P. Desmarais, he refused. O'Reilly had to forcibly eject Desmarais from the church property; he responded by trying to sue O'Reilly for assault and battery.

O'Reilly laid the cornerstone of Saint Francis de Sales Cathedral in Baker in 1906, dedicating the building in 1908. He also completed a new 115-bed facility for St. Elizabeth Hospital in Baker in 1915. With financial assistance from the Catholic Church Extension Society, he increased the number of parishes in the diocese from six in 1903 to 25 in 1918. O'Reilly became bishop of the Diocese of Lincoln in 1918.

In July 1918, Pope Benedict XV named Terrence G. Brady of the Archdiocese of Dubuque as the next bishop of Baker City. However, Brady declined the appointment. In December 1918, the pope instead named Joseph Francis McGrath from the Diocese of Seattle as bishop in Baker City.

During McGrath's 31-year tenure in Baker City, the Catholic population increased from 6,755 to 14,729 and the number of priests increased from 26 to 39; however, the total number of churches (including parishes and missions) fell from 54 to 50. With only one parochial school in the diocese at the beginning of his tenure, McGrath mandated that the Confraternity of Christian Doctrine be established in every parish and mission.

In 1948, McGrath received Leo Fabian Fahey as a coadjutor bishop to assist him.

=== 1950 to present ===
Before Fahey could succeed McGrath as bishop, he died in March 1950. Less than two weeks later, McGrath himself died. In July 1950, Pope Pius XII appointed Francis Leipzig of Oregon City as the third bishop of Baker City. The Vatican in 1952 renamed the Diocese of Baker City as just the Diocese of Baker.

During his 21-year tenure, Leipzig built over 95 churches, hospitals, schools, and convents. After reaching the mandatory retirement age of 75, he retired in 1971.

Pope Paul VI in 1971 selected Thomas Joseph Connolly of the Diocese of Reno as the second bishop of Baker. Following the reforms of the Second Vatican Council, Connolly established a priests' council, an annual presbyteral assembly, a sisters' council, and a diocesan pastoral council with lay participation. Connolly oversaw a large-scale renovation of St. Francis de Sales Cathedral in the early 1980s.

Connolly also scheduled regular masses in Spanish, established a program to assist undocumented immigrants to apply for citizenship, and ordained the first class of permanent deacons for the diocese. Connolly retired in 1997. Pope John Paul II in 1999 appointed Robert F. Vasa as bishop of Baker.

=== 2000 to present ===
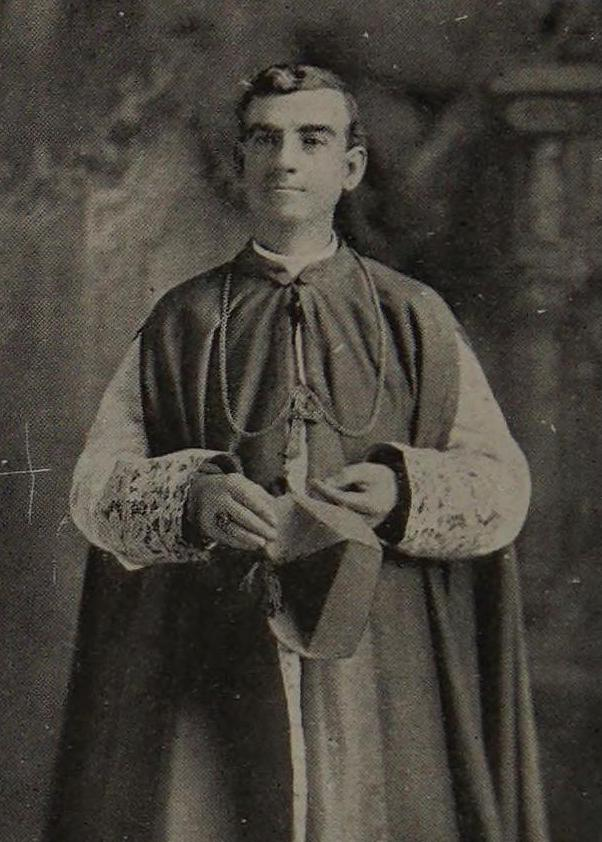
Bishop O'Reilly (2013)

Vasa in 2002 began the process of transferring diocesan assets to its individual parishes. This move was challenged in court, with the plaintiffs claiming that Vasa was attempting to shield the diocese from judgements in sexual abuse settlements. In 2003, a judge ruled that there was no evidence of fraud and that Vasa could complete the transfers.

In a 2006 column, Vasa implied that Catholics who supported abortion rights for women were guilty of a so-called heresy of murder. Vasa stated in 2010 that St. Charles Medical Center in Bend had "gradually moved away" from the church's ethical directives and could no longer be called Catholic. As a result, Vasa would not allow priests to celebrate mass in the hospital chapel and St. Charles was forced to return all Catholic religious items to the diocese. However, the hospital retained the St. Charles name and the cross on his facility. Vasa became coadjutor bishop for the Diocese of Santa Rosa in 2011.

Liam Cary of Portland was named the bishop of Baker by Pope Benedict XVI in 2012. In April 2013, Cary asked James Radloff to resign as pastor of his parish in Bend and take a posting in a small town in rural Oregon. Cary was allegedly upset over Radloff's support of a petition opposing the transfer of another priest. Radloff appealed Cary's order to the Congregation for Clergy, which in January 2014 upheld the order. Radloff in April 2014 announced that he was joining the Evangelical Catholic Church.

In 2017, the diocese moved the chancery to Redmond. On July 10, 2025, Pope Leo XIV named Thomas J. Hennen of the Diocese of Davenport, Iowa as the seventh bishop of the diocese.

== Territory ==
The Diocese of Baker consists of the counties of Baker, Crook, Deschutes, Gilliam, Grant, Harney, Hood River, Jefferson, Klamath, Lake, Malheur, Morrow, Sherman, Umatilla, Union, Wallowa, Wasco and Wheeler in Eastern Oregon.

== Bishops ==
=== Bishops of Baker City ===
1. Charles Joseph O'Reilly (1903-1918)
2. Joseph Francis McGrath (1918-1950)
  - Leo Fabian Fahey (coadjutor bishop 1948–1950), died before succession
3. Francis Peter Leipzig (1950-1952), title changed with title of diocese

=== Bishops of Baker ===
1. Francis Peter Leipzig (1952-1971)
2. Thomas Joseph Connolly (1971-1999)
3. Robert F. Vasa (2000-2011), appointed Coadjutor Bishop of Santa Rosa in California
4. Liam Cary (2012–2025)
5. Thomas J. Hennen (2025–present)

=== Other diocesan priest who became a bishop ===
Elden Francis Curtiss, appointed Bishop of Helena in 1976 and later Archbishop of Omaha

== Education ==
As of 2025, the Diocese of Baker operates four schools with an approximate enrollment of 500 students. The oldest school is St. Mary's Academy, founded in 1863.

- St. Francis of Assisi Catholic School, Bend
- St. Mary's Academy, The Dalles
- St. Peter Catholic School, Ontario
- St. Thomas Catholic School, Redmond
