= Charles Joseph O'Reilly =

Canadian-born American prelate

His Excellency. The Right Reverend Charles Joseph O'Reilly
- Bishop of Lincoln
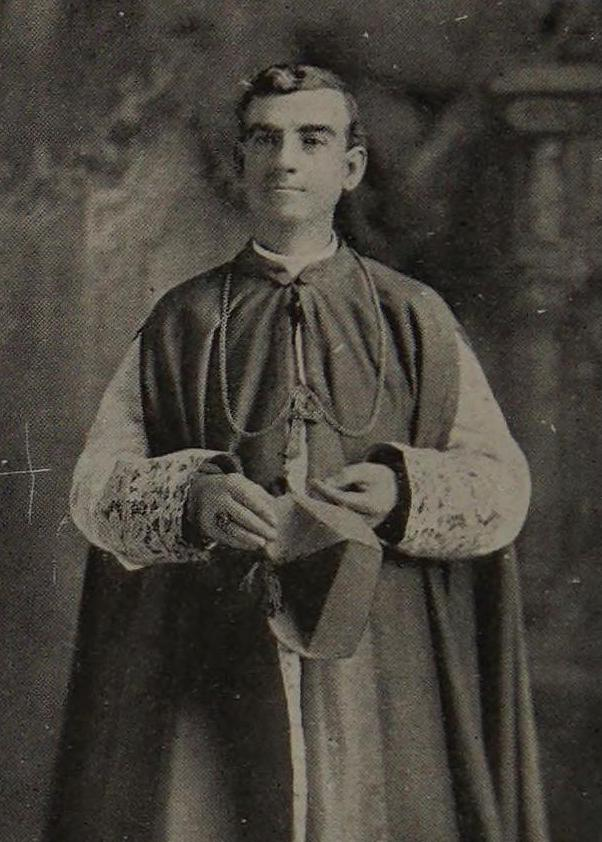
- Church: Catholic Church
- Diocese: Diocese of Lincoln
- Appointed: March 20, 1918
- Term ended: February 4, 1923 (his death)
- Predecessor: John Henry Tihen
- Successor: Francis Beckman
- Other post: Bishop of Baker City (1903-1918)

Orders
- Ordination: June 29, 1890 by William Hickley Gross
- Consecration: August 25, 1903 by Alexander Christie

Personal details
- Born: January 4, 1860 Saint John, New Brunswick, Canada
- Died: February 4, 1923 (aged 63) Lincoln, Nebraska, U.S.
- Education: Grand Seminary of Montreal
- Motto: In domino confido (I trust in the Lord)

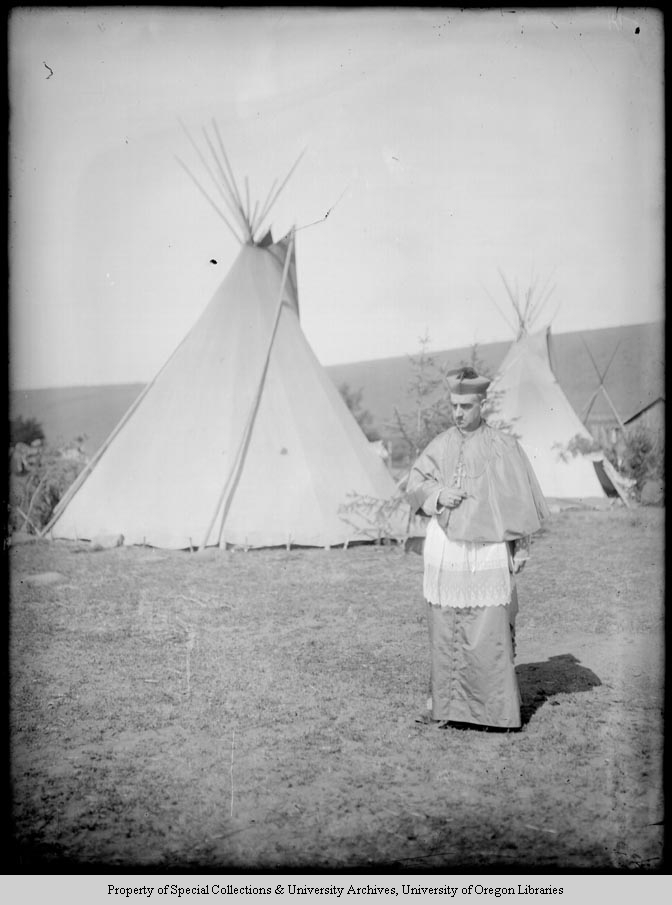
Bishop O'Reilly visiting Umatilla Indian reservation in Oregon (1907)

Charles Joseph O'Reilly (January 4, 1860 – February 4, 1923) was a Canadian-born American prelate of the Catholic Church. He served as the first bishop of the Diocese of Baker City in Oregon (1903–1918) and the third bishop of the Diocese of Lincoln in Nebraska (1918–1923).

== Early life ==
O'Reilly was born on January 4, 1860, in Saint John, New Brunswick, to Peter and Bridget (née Walsh) O'Reilly. His sister Margaret joined the Visitation Sisters in Tacoma, Washington.

O'Reilly received his early education under the Christian Brothers in Saint John. He then attended St. Joseph's College in Memramcook, New Brunswick, graduating with a Master of Arts.

In 1884, O'Reilly moved with his family to the United States, settling in Portland, Oregon. He served as principal of St. Michael's College in Portland until 1885, when the Christian Brothers took charge of the school. Deciding to become a priest, O'Reilly studied for the priesthood at the Grand Seminary in Montreal, Quebec.

== Priesthood ==
After returning to Portland, O'Reilly was ordained into the priesthood for the Archdiocese of Oregon City on June 29, 1890, by Archbishop William Gross.

Following his ordination, the archdiocese assigned O'Reilly to missions in Lake Oswego and Tigard, Oregon, erecting churches at both locations. He was named pastor of Immaculate Heart of Mary Parish in the Albina neighborhood of Portland in 1894. During his pastorate, he established himself as "a firm believer in total abstinence" from alcohol consumption. He founded a boys' club to deter young Catholic men from "frequenting the saloons and other resorts."

In addition to his pastoral duties, O'Reilly worked as editor of the Catholic Sentinel, the archdiocesan newspaper, in 1900.

=== Bishop of Baker City ===
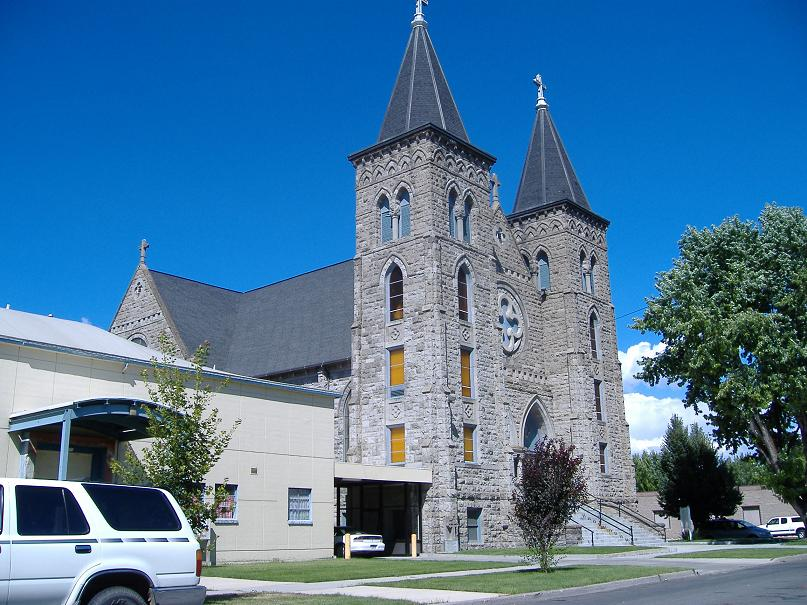
Saint Francis de Sales Cathedral, Baker City, Oregon (2007)

On June 25, 1903, O'Reilly was appointed bishop of the newly erected Diocese of Baker City by Pope Leo XIII. O'Reilly received his episcopal consecration at Saint Mary's Cathedral of the Immaculate Conception in Portland on August 25, 1903, from Archbishop Alexander Christie, with Bishops Alphonse Glorieux and Edward O'Dea serving as co-consecrators.

The new diocese consisted of more than 65,000 square miles east of the Cascade Mountains in Oregon, which O'Reilly described as "terra incognita". It was said that Archbishop Christie had relegated discontented priests from the archdiocese to Baker City. On O'Reilly's arrival in Baker City, he was greeted by four armed priests. When O'Reilly later tried to reassign Louis P. Desmarais, one of those armed priests, to another parish, he refused. In response, O'Reilly personally ejected him from the church property; Desmarais responded by suing O'Reilly for assault and battery.

O'Reilly laid the cornerstone of Saint Francis de Sales Cathedral in Baker in 1906, dedicating the building in 1908. He also completed a new 115-bed facility for St. Elizabeth Hospital in Baker in 1915. With financial assistance from the Catholic Church Extension Society in Chicago, Illinois, he increased the number of parishes in the diocese from six in 1903 to 25 in 1918.

=== Bishop of Lincoln ===
O'Reilly was named the third bishop of Lincoln on March 20, 1918, by Pope Benedict XV. As opposed to his arrival in Baker City, O'Reilly received a warm welcome in Lincoln, Nebraska, with a reception attended by Nebraska Governor Keith Neville.

Early into his tenure at Lincoln, O'Reilly had to contend with the 1918 influenza pandemic, which claimed the lives of many priests and religious sisters. He traveled to Rome in 1921 to recruit more priests, especially for the large Czech-speaking population in the diocese. During his five years as bishop, he established six new parochial schools and three new parishes.

Already suffering from arteriosclerosis, O'Reilly fell in December 1922, leaving him confined to St. Elizabeth's Hospital in Lincoln for the final two months of his life. O'Reilly died in Lincoln on February 4, 1923, at age 63.

Catholic Church titles
Preceded by none	Bishop of Baker City; 1903–1918	Succeeded by Joseph Francis McGrath
Preceded by John Henry Tihen	Bishop of Lincoln; 1918–1923	Succeeded by Francis Beckman
