= 2021 St. Paul Park refinery strike =

Labor dispute in Minnesota

- Date: January 21 – July 1, 2021 (5 months, 1 week and 3 days)
- Location: St. Paul Park, Minnesota, United States
- Goals: New labor contract with protections against outsourcing and hiring of subcontractors
- Methods: Strike action; Boycott
- Result: Lockout; New labor contracts with guarantees against outsourcing and hiring of subcontractors

Parties
Marathon Petroleum	International Brotherhood of Teamsters Local 120

The 2021 St. Paul Park refinery strike was a labor dispute in St. Paul Park, Minnesota, United States. The strike, involving approximately 200 workers, took place at an oil refinery owned by Marathon Petroleum and began on January 21, 2021, with members of Local 120 of the International Brotherhood of Teamsters alleging unfair labor practices and unsafe working conditions. According to union representatives, the strike was originally intended to last for one day, but that the company performed a lockout on the workers. While the company denies that the dispute is a lockout, multiple sources, including the Star Tribune and the news agency Reuters, described the dispute as a lockout.

== Background ==
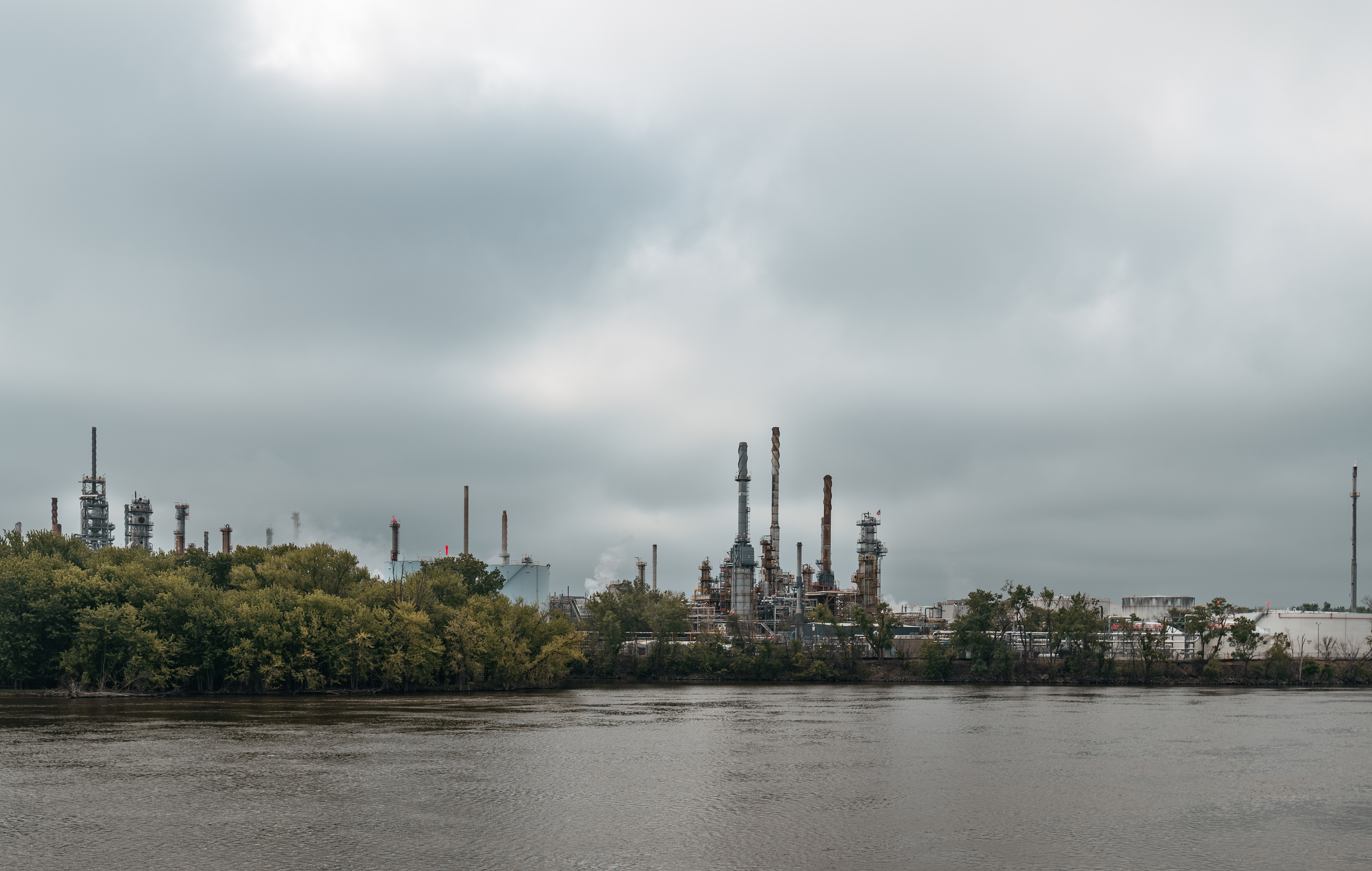
The refinery as seen from the Mississippi River.

Marathon Petroleum is a major American petroleum company that operates an oil refinery in St. Paul Park, Minnesota in the United States. This refinery, which as of January 2021 processed around 100,000 barrels per day, services locations throughout the midwestern United States, including numerous Speedway LLC locations. Starting in November 2020, company officials had been negotiating new labor contracts with representatives of the International Brotherhood of Teamsters Local 120, the local union which represents approximately 200 workers at the facility. However, disagreements persisted between the union and the company, with the union rejecting Marathon's stance on hiring subcontractors for work primarily performed by union members. According to a union representative, Marathon's subcontracting proposal would result in about 40 union jobs being outsourced. In December, union members voted to authorize strike action against the company if a new contract had not been agreed to by the end of the year. On December 31, the existing contract expired without a replacement, but representatives continued to negotiate through January. On January 21, 2021, members voted by a significant margin (Note: Sources report the vote as either 167 to 4 or 197 to 4.) to reject a contract offer made by the company and prepared to take strike action. At that time, there had been 22 negotiating sessions between the union and the company.

== Course of the strike ==
The strike began in the afternoon of January 21, with about 200 workers participating. Unfair labor practice charges were filed by the union with the National Labor Relations Board, who also alleged that the company was bargaining in bad faith. At the start of the strike, Marathon put out a statement stating that they had become aware of the workers' intent to strike beforehand and had made preparations regarding the operation of the refinery, with no disruptions expected. As reported by a union representative, the strike was originally intended to last one day. However, after 24 hours, when the workers offered to return to work, the company performed a lockout and accused the workers of trespassing. Marathon denies that a lockout occurred and instead countered that the workers are still on strike. however, multiple sources, including the Star Tribune and the news agency Reuters, characterize the ongoing dispute as a lockout. During the ongoing dispute, Marathon has brought in several workers from out of state.

On March 2, a group of state treasurers sent a letter to Marathon officials urging them to end the lockout. The treasurers, all members of the Democratic Party, were from the U.S. states of Illinois, Maine, Maryland, Massachusetts, and Oregon. Additional calls to end the lockout have been made from several state politicians, including U.S. Representative Betty McCollum and Minnesota Governor Tim Walz, the latter of whom participated in picketing with the strikers in February. As of March 11, talks between union and company representatives were scheduled for March 19 and March 23. On March 30, the St. Paul Pioneer Press reported that the strike had been expanded to include a boycott of eight Speedway locations in Cottage Grove, Minneapolis, Newport, Oakdale, Saint Paul, White Bear Lake, and Woodbury, with plans to boycott additional stations in the following weeks. Around this same time, the Minnesota Association of Professional Employees announced their support for the strike. In another show of support from other labor unions, several local unions under the banner of Local Jobs North Dakota Minnesota issued a report expressing safety concerns over the qualifications and experience of the replacement workers. On April 29, Marathon released a statement stating that they were still at an impasse with the union over several "non-starter" issues, including whether or not the activity occurring was a lockout or strike action, with the company still maintaining that the Teamsters were willingly engaged in a strike.

On June 22, union members voted to reject an offer that Marathon had made on March 1, stating that the agreement would have cost 40 jobs at the facility. However, on July 1, the union announced that they had accepted a new deal with Marathon that saw an immediate end to the strike. According to the union, the six-year contract included guarantees against the hiring of subcontractors, which had been the cause of the strike.

== See also ==
- COVID-19 pandemic in Minnesota
- Strikes during the COVID-19 pandemic
