= Francis Peter Leipzig =

Catholic bishop (1895–1981)

His Excellency, The Most Reverend Francis Peter Leipzig
- Bishop of Baker
- Church: Roman Catholic Church
- Diocese: Baker
- In office: 1950 to 1971
- Predecessor: Joseph Francis McGrath
- Successor: Thomas Joseph Connolly
- Previous post: Bishop of Baker City

Orders
- Ordination: April 17, 1920 by Alexander Christie
- Consecration: September 12, 1951 by Edward Daniel Howard

Personal details
- Born: June 29, 1895 Chilton, Wisconsin, US
- Died: January 17, 1981 (aged 85) Beaverton, Oregon, US
- Denomination: Roman Catholic
- Parents: Francis and Mary (née Cordy) Leipzig
- Education: Mount Angel Seminary; St. Francis Seminary
- Motto: Maria me custodiat (May Mary protect me)

Francis Peter Leipzig (June 29, 1895—January 17, 1981) was an American prelate of the Roman Catholic Church. He served as bishop of Baker City in Oregon from 1950 to 1971.

== Biography ==
=== Early life ===
Francis Leipzig was born on June 29, 1895 in Chilton, Wisconsin, the fourth child of Francis and Mary (née Cordy) Leipzig. He enrolled at St. Francis Seminary in Milwaukee, Wisconsin, but later moved with his family to Portland, Oregon. He attended Mount Angel Seminary in St Benedict, Oregon, and then studied theology at St. Patrick's Seminary in Menlo Park, California.

=== Priesthood ===
Leipzig was ordained to the priesthood in Portland for the Archdiocese of Oregon City by Archbishop Alexander Christie on April 17, 1920. He served as a curate at St. James Parish in McMinnville, Oregon, and afterwards at Good Shepherd Parish in Sheridan, Oregon. Leipzig was transferred to the Cathedral of Portland in 1921. He served as pastor of St. Mary Parish in Corvallis, Oregon, for seven years before being transferred to St. Mary Parish in Eugene, Oregon.

=== Bishop of Baker City and Baker ===
On July 18, 1950, Leipzig was appointed the third bishop of Baker City by Pope Pius XII. He received his episcopal consecration at Saint Mary's Cathedral in Portland on September 12, 1950, from Archbishop Edward Daniel Howard, with Archbishop Edwin Vincent O'Hara and Bishop Edward Joseph Kelly serving as co-consecrators.

In 1952, Pius XII changed the name of the Diocese of Baker City to the Diocese of Baker. Between 1962 and 1965, Leipzig attended all four sessions of the Second Vatican Council in Rome. During his 21-year-tenure as bishop, he built over 95 churches, hospitals, schools, and convents.

=== Retirement and death ===
After reaching the mandatory retirement age of 75, Leipzig resigned as bishop of Baker on April 26, 1971. He died in Beaverton, Oregon, on January 17, 1981, at age 85.

Catholic Church titles
Preceded by Joseph Francis McGrath	Bishop of Baker; 1950—1971	Succeeded by Thomas Joseph Connolly
