= Liam Cary =

American Catholic prelate (born 1947)

His Excellency, The Most Reverend Liam Stephen Cary
- Bishop Emeritus of Baker
- Church: Catholic Church
- Diocese: Baker
- Appointed: March 8, 2012
- Installed: May 18, 2012
- Retired: July 10, 2025
- Predecessor: Robert F. Vasa
- Successor: Thomas J. Hennen

Orders
- Ordination: September 5, 1992 by William Levada
- Consecration: May 18, 2012 by John George Vlazny, Robert F. Vasa, and William S. Skylstad

Personal details
- Born: August 21, 1947 (age 78) Portland, Oregon, US
- Education: Mount Angel Seminary; St. Patrick's Seminary; Pontifical Gregorian University
- Motto: Veritas vos liberabit (The truth will set you free)

Styles of Liam Stephen Cary
- Reference style: His Excellency; The Most Reverend
- Spoken style: Your Excellency
- Religious style: Bishop

Liam Stephen Cary (born August 21, 1947) is an American prelate of the Roman Catholic Church. He had served as bishop of the Diocese of Baker in Oregon since 2012 until his retirement on July 10, 2025.

== Biography ==
=== Early life and education ===
Liam Cary was born on August 21, 1947, in Portland, Oregon. Three years later the family moved to Prineville, Oregon. Liam Cary studied for the priesthood at Mount Angel Seminary in St. Benedict, Oregon and St. Patrick's Seminary in Menlo Park, California. Cary then entered residence at the Pontifical North American College in Rome. He received a Bachelor of Sacred Theology degree and a Licentiate in Sacred Theology from the Pontifical Gregorian University in Rome. In 1970, he took a leave of absence from St. Patrick's seminary, returning to his studies 18 years later.

=== Priesthood ===
Cary was ordained a priest for the Archdiocese of Portland by Archbishop William Levada on September 5, 1992. After his ordination Cary served as the parochial vicar at St. Joseph Parish in Salem, Oregon (1992–1995), archdiocesan vocation director (1995–1999) and pastor at Sacred Heart Parish Medford, Oregon, St. Luke's Parish in Woodburn, Oregon (1999–2011) and St. Mary's Parish in Eugene, Oregon (2011–2012).

=== Bishop of Baker ===
Cary was named the bishop of Baker by Pope Benedict XVI on March 8, 2012. His episcopal consecration took place on May 18, 2012, at the hands of Archbishop John Vlazny. Bishops Robert F. Vasa and William Skylstad were the co-consecrators.

On July 10, 2025, Pope Leo XIV accepted Cary's resignation as bishop of Baker after he passed the mandatory retirement age of 75.

== See also ==
- Catholic Church hierarchy
- Catholic Church in the United States
- Historical list of the Catholic bishops of the United States
- List of Catholic bishops of the United States
- Lists of patriarchs, archbishops, and bishops

Catholic Church titles
Preceded by Robert F. Vasa	Bishop of Baker; 2012–2025	Succeeded by Thomas J. Hennen
