= Strike notice =

Union document stating intent to strike

A strike notice (or notice to strike) is a document served by members of a trade union or an analogous body of workers to an employer or negotiator stating an intent to commit an upcoming strike action. The document largely contains:

- an overview of grievances and conditions
- a statement that negotiations with the employer have failed
- an intended time and duration for the strike
- advice to prepare for the impact of the strike and return to the negotiating table at the earliest

A strike notice is usually issued to an employer or negotiators after union leadership and participating workers have agreed on the set terms of a strike action. In contrast, a wildcat strike action usually involves workers going on strike without the approval of union leadership or the serving of a notice.

Strike notices are often legally required of public sector workers or unions within a specific period (i.e., 10 days before the intended strike action commencement).
