= St. Elizabeth Health Services =

- Saint Alphonsus Health System
- Shown in Oregon

Geography
- Location: Baker City, Oregon, United States
- Coordinates: 44.795°N 117.847°W

Organization
- Care system: Private
- Type: Community

Services
- Emergency department: Level IV
- Beds: 126

Helipads
- Helipad: FAA LID: 93OR

History
- Founded: August 24, 1897

Links
- Lists: Hospitals in Oregon

St. Elizabeth Health Services is a private Roman Catholic hospital in Baker City, Oregon, United States. It opened August 24, 1897 as St. Elizabeth Hospital. In 1912, a 115-bed facility was constructed at 2365 4th Street. The hospital moved to its current location on Pocahontas Road in April 1969.

== History ==
The Sisters of St. Francis of Philadelphia opened as St. Elizabeth Hospital on August 24, 1897, as requested by Archbishop William H. Gross. The hospital was first operated by just three sisters and was located at the corner of Second and Church streets in the former St. Francis Academy, which had also been operated by the sisters. One group to which St. Elizabeth Hospital provided care was the local gold miners. A kind of health insurance was offered to the miners who paid one dollar a month to the hospital. In return, each miner received complete health care services, which made St. Elizabeth Hospital one of the earliest health maintenance organizations in the country.

In 1912, construction began for a new 115-bed facility that was completed in 1915. During the 1918 Spanish flu epidemic, many influenza patients were treated at the hospital, and sisters also went to people's homes to care for them.

=== National Register of Historic Places ===
- St. Elizabeth Hospital (Old)
- U.S. National Register of Historic Places
- Location: 2365 Fourth St., Baker, Oregon
- Coordinates: 44°46′49″N 117°50′2″W
- Area: 1.5 acres (0.6 ha)
- Built: 1915
- Architect: White, Michael P.; et al.
- Architectural style: Tudor Revival, Other, Jacobethan Revival
- NRHP reference No.: 89000047
- Added to NRHP: February 21, 1989

The Tudor Revival style Old St. Elizabeth Hospital (also known as St. Elizabeth Nursing Home and St. Elizabeth Towers) constructed in 1912 was listed in the National Register of Historic Places on February 21, 1987. Its reference number is 89000047. The building served as a nursing home from 1969 until 1987, when a new nursing home was constructed adjacent to the newer hospital on Pocahontas Road. The old hospital now serves as a condominium and vacation rental complex.

== Sister hospitals ==
St. Elizabeth was operated by Catholic Health Initiatives (CHI) of Colorado until April 1, 2010. At that time it became a part of Trinity Health and a member of the Saint Alphonsus Health System. Shortly thereafter the name was officially changed to Saint Alphonsus Medical Center - Baker City. Other Saint Alphonsus Health System hospitals include Saint Alphonsus Medical Center - Ontario (previously known as Holy Rosary Medical Center), Saint Alphonsus Medical Center - Nampa (previously named Mercy Medical Center), and Saint Alphonsus Regional Medical Center in Boise, Idaho. The only other CHI hospitals in Oregon now are Mercy Medical Center in Roseburg, and St. Anthony Hospital in Pendleton.

== Heliport ==
St. Elizabeth Hospital Heliport (FAA LID: 93OR) is the hospital's private 42-foot-long (13 m) asphalt heliport located at 44°47′39.55″N 117°50′45.79″W.

== See also ==
- Saint Francis de Sales Cathedral
- List of hospitals in Oregon
- Roman Catholic Archdiocese of Portland
