= Aerosol-generating procedure =

Medical or health-care procedure that produces airborne particles

An aerosol-generating procedure (AGP) is a medical or health-care procedure that a public health agency such as the World Health Organization or the United States Centers for Disease Control and Prevention (CDC) has designated as creating an increased risk of transmission of an aerosol borne contagious disease, such as COVID-19. The presumption is that the risk of transmission of the contagious disease from a patient having an AGP performed on them is higher than for a patient who is not having an AGP performed upon them. This then informs decisions on infection control, such as what personal protective equipment (PPE) is required by a healthcare worker performing the medical procedure, or what PPE healthcare workers are allowed to use.

Designation of a procedure as an AGP may indicate a presumption that such a procedure causes the emission of more aerosols than a patient not undergoing the procedure. Such a position is at increasing odds with the scientific understanding of bioaerosol production and airborne transmission of respiratory infections. At times, healthcare workers concerned about their own risk of contracting airborne infections have been denied access to respirators outside the employment of AGPs.

Medical procedures that have been designated as AGPs include positive-pressure mechanical ventilation including BiPAP and continuous positive airway pressure (CPAP), high-frequency ventilation, tracheal intubation, airway suction, tracheostomy, chest physiotherapy, nebuliser treatment, sputum induction, bronchoscopy and ultrasonic scaling and root planing. Different public health agencies have different lists of AGPs. The term AGP became popular during the 2003 SARS epidemic, where small retrospective studies showed a higher rate of infection amongst healthcare workers in which the AGPs were performed.

== COVID-19 pandemic ==
The COVID-19 pandemic has prompted research to measure the aerosols produced by patients during some AGPs including tracheal intubation and extubation, gastroscopies, colonoscopies and trans-nasal endoscopies. The AGPs studied generate less aerosols than a cough or even just breathing, so some AGPs may not increase the risk from aerosol-borne diseases such as COVID-19 significantly above that of a patient breathing or coughing normally. In a study that looked for viral RNA in air samples taken near patients with COVID-19, no correlation was found between finding viral RNA and mechanical ventilation, high flow nasal cannula, nebuliser treatment or non-invasive ventilation. However data are still lacking for many AGPs. Conversely, fine and ultrafine aerosols constitute the majority of all detectable viral RNA in COVID-19 positive symptomatic and asymptomatic individuals during breathing, talking, and singing.
