= Leo Fabian Fahey =

American Catholic priest (1898–1950)

- Coadjutor Bishop of Baker
- In office: 1948-1950

Orders
- Ordination: May 29, 1926
- Consecration: May 26, 1948

Personal details
- Born: July 21, 1898 Bay St. Louis, Mississippi
- Died: March 31, 1950 (aged 51)
- Denomination: Roman Catholic

Leo Fabian Fahey (July 21, 1898 – March 31, 1950) was an American prelate of the Roman Catholic Church who served as coadjutor bishop of the Diocese of Baker City, Oregon from 1948 until his death in 1950.

== Biography ==
Born in Bay St. Louis, Mississippi, Fahey was ordained a priest on May 29, 1926.

On May 13, 1948, he was appointed titular bishop of 'Ipsus' and coadjutor bishop of the Diocese of Baker City, Oregon and was consecrated on May 26, 1948. Fahey died while he was still coadjutor bishop.

== Notes ==
Catholic Church titles
Preceded by –	Coadjutor Bishop of Baker; 1948–1950	Succeeded by –
