= Impact of the COVID-19 pandemic on healthcare workers =

The COVID-19 pandemic has impacted healthcare workers physically and psychologically. Healthcare workers are more vulnerable to COVID-19 infection than the general population due to frequent contact with positive COVID-19 patients. Healthcare workers have been required to work under stressful conditions without proper protective equipment, and make difficult decisions involving ethical implications. Health and social systems across the globe are struggling to cope. The situation is especially challenging in humanitarian, fragile and low-income country contexts, where health and social systems are already weak. Services to provide sexual and reproductive health care risk being sidelined, which will lead to higher maternal mortality and morbidity.

== Challenges ==
=== Infection ===
The World Health Organization reported that one in ten health workers is infected with coronavirus in some countries. In March 2020, 9% of those affected with COVID-19 in Italy were health workers. In May 2020, the International Council of Nurses reported that at least 90,000 healthcare workers have been infected and more than 260 nurses had died due to the COVID-19 pandemic. In March 2020, one in four doctors in the UK were off sick, in isolation or caring for a family member with COVID-19.

The UK government announced that retired healthcare professionals would be brought out of retirement to help during the COVID-19 crisis. This led to concerns that they could be at a higher risk for severe COVID-19 illness.

=== Shortage of PPEs ===
Shortcomings of personal protective equipment have been reported from several countries. In China, inadequate staff training, shortage of PPEs, reduced understanding of PPE use and confused PPE guidance have resulted in infections and deaths among healthcare workers.

In the United States, many hospitals have reported a shortage of PPE for hospital staff. As COVID-19 cases increase, it is suggested that the United States will need far more surgical masks than they currently have.

One unique study used a qualitative style of research by conducting interviews to record nurses' feedback on staff shortages, long hours, and uncooperative patients. One profound participant responded, "I am not able to sleep at all and even if I do then by that time it is already time to wake up". The nurses have been overworked by having to fill in for staff shortages on top of the more demanding working conditions. Another response read, "wearing PPE was the most troublesome. No food or water for 12 h". PPE accessibility varied in many countries, but all countries faced similar shortages of the proper supplies to protect them when working in a highly infectious environment every day.

The shortage of PPE has put many healthcare workers at risks for getting infected with COVID-19. Healthcare workers have created unconventional solutions to make up for the lack of PPE by using the resources they do have in stock. Healthcare workers have definitely had to get creative when it comes to PPE! They have used plastic bags as gowns and plastic water bottle cutouts for eye protection. The shortage of PPE is even worse for hospitals in low income communities. Items such as PPE have always been scare commodities in low income countries. Low income countries also are receiving the vaccine at a slower rate due to unequal distribution. Developing countries can not properly store and produce the vaccine to be able to vaccinate the population as quick as other developed countries. UICEF reported that the organization was only able to acquire one tenth of the 240 million masks requested by these communities. While PPE becomes less effective at protecting against illness as it is reused, prolonged wear also causes skin damage for 97% of healthcare workers. Skin damage is most commonly occurring on the bridge of the nose, caused by irritation from face masks.

=== Deaths ===
Nurse and doctor deaths due to COVID-19 have been reported from several countries. In May 2020, they added that at least 260 nurses have died due to COVID-19. In March 2020, at least 50 doctors were reported to have died in Italy due to COVID-19. The number of deaths in Italy continued to go up. By April 2020, the estimated number of medical doctor deaths was about 119 and for nurses about 34. Two of the deaths within those who were nurses were suicides due to unsustainable pressure at work.

On 8 August 2020, the Indian Medical Association announced that 198 doctors have died in India due to COVID-19. By February 2021, the Indian Medical Association said the number of deaths of doctor in India due to COVID-19 had increased to 734; however the government of India said that only 162 doctors had died due to COVID-19.

=== Understaffing ===
At this point in time, it seems like everyone is struggling with understaffing, this is also true for the healthcare field. Even before the pandemic understaffing in the medical field was not uncommon throughout history. However, through the Covid fight, the impact of understaffing has been amplified. In an observational research study, Lasater and other researchers, showed that nurses' workloads were very high and that half of the nursing staff was experiencing burnout. It was also discovered that "Unfavorable patient and nurse outcomes are strongly associated with poorer nurse staffing". Without the proper staffing to handle the influx of Covid patients nurses can not provide patients with the best care. They simply do not have the employees to account for all the patients

=== Rising to the challenge ===
COVID-19 has affected everyone and, "The nursing literature and social media are awash with stories of nurses exhausted, frightened, sometimes discriminated against, feeling burnt out, overworked, demoralized by ineffectual leadership of governments and health systems, or frustrated with the indifference of the public to adhere to public health regulations''. These challenges are impacting the nursing community so much that it is affecting them mentally and physically. Burnout in nurses is very serious and without intervention, it leads to diminished patient care. Not only do these nurses have to deal with the added stress of being overworked, but they are also falling victim to the virus as well. "ICN's believes that about 10% of COVID-19 cases globally are among healthcare workers". Nurses are the publics' defense in the pandemic, but because of the lacking resources, the nurses cannot totally protect themselves or provide the best patient care. Learning from and adapting from problems is exactly how they are solved. Solutions are not instantaneous and they are not always apparent, but as they say "where there's a will there's a way". In another research study its brought to light that during the pandemic perceived stress was lowered, because of the national support. This study shows that nurses are resilient and are rising to the new challenges with the support of others.

== Psychological impact ==
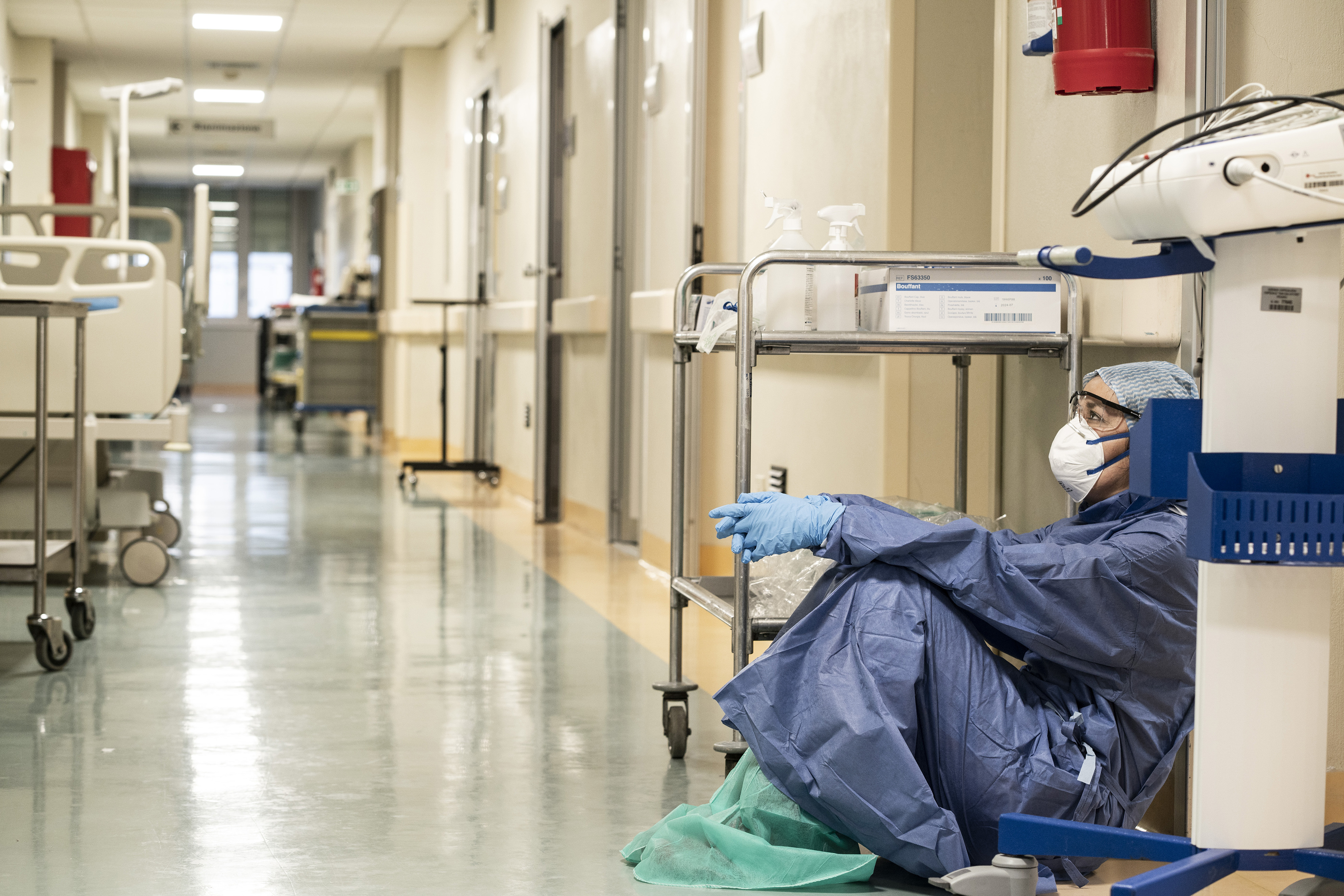
An exhausted anesthesiologist physician in Pesaro, Italy, March 2020

The viral image of Dr. Sohil Makwana inside the PPE kit and drenched in sweat after removing the protective gears. India, April 2021.

Higher levels of depression and burnout have been seen in healthcare workers as a direct result of COVID-19. In one experiment scientists reported that "more than 28% of the sample reported high levels of emotional exhaustion, except for other non-COVID healthcare workers" In addition more than 50% of the sample reported low levels of depersonalization, except for COVID nurses and physicians, who reported high levels of depersonalization in 36.73% of the cases. Depersonalization can be defined as a sense of detachment from oneself and one's identity. Taking this into consideration, it is easy to conclude that as a result of COVID-19 the mental health of health care workers has degraded. In addition, when evaluating the results of another study led by Dr. Woon et al., the prevalence rates of depression as a result of COVID-19 were as high as 21.8% and participants with extremely severe depression made up 13.3% of the sample.

Healthcare workers are at risk for developing trauma or other stress-related disorders due to fears of falling ill and not knowing what will happen in the future. Post-traumatic stress was common among health workers, with nurses demonstrating a higher likelihood of developing or having anxiety among others in the medical field.

The severity of these psychological impacts on healthcare workers in the United States has even resulted in stress-related illnesses which could cause serious health related issues. Some of these stress-related illnesses include cardiovascular disease, gastrointestinal symptoms, and musculoskeletal disorders.

Due to the stress from the Coronavirus many nurses are facing compassion fatigue and burnout. Part of burnout is due to a nursing shortage, there are more patients than nurses are used to taking care of at once. Increasing workload has made longer shifts for most nurses, lack of enthusiasm, and many have become emotionally drained.

As the COVID-19 pandemic escalated, widespread anxiety grew and culminated in decreased desire and interest to pursue hospital-based care. Consider the intense fear of a patient adamantly refusing to visit a health facility and resorting to recuperate from the comfort of their homes to avoid the COVID-19 anguish. The anxiety was far-reaching as the COVID-19 scare deepened. Patients, especially those with underlying or chronic conditions chose to stay at home or seek alternative interventions just to avoid interacting with medical personnel or appearing in public spaces. Albeit being driven by formed opinion, their hesitation and self-preservation offer clear lenses through which to view the existing gaps within the public health discourse. It was the hallmark of public health breakdown as unchecked and un-intervened health conditions aggravated. It also subjected public health to scrutiny as patients skipped or delayed routine screenings while emergent ailments remained undressed. The COVID-19 pandemic scare yielded profound implications for populations, questioning the overall posture and prospect of public health interventions.

Literature highlights that avoidance and deferral behaviors and trends can trigger debilitating health outcomes. These behaviors create enabling conditions for diseases to flare up and become less manageable. The trend is typical of delayed diagnoses, which enable the progression of chronic conditions leading to increased casualties. The psychological impact culminating in avoidance and deferral presents scholars with new lenses for analyzing these trends.

The COVID-19 pandemic created extensive anxiety across diverse healthcare settings. These anxieties resulted in systematic avoidance and deferrals as populations resorted to the behaviors in response to the COVID-19 scare. These trends affected populations across diverse demographics, leading to debilitating care outcomes. Future efforts should foster innovative strategies such as telehealth, public education, and patient-centered interventions to expand healthcare scope and reduce the overall impact related to public health scare.

There are so many burdens that healthcare workers face due to working on the front line of the pandemic. The results showed that work burnout can be a major factor for the healthcare workers on top of other emotional challenges.

It is possible that these statistics may be so significant due to self-isolating or being in quarantine. Wu et al. explain that after conducting their research they had found that those who have participated in these activities reported more symptoms of depression. In contrast, researchers suspect that the depression and/ or burnout that healthcare workers are experiencing may not be from COVID-19 directly, but as a result of the situation it has put their families in and/or themselves in. It is said that as a result of COVID-19 the workload of healthcare providers has increased tremendously, possibly leaving the worker feeling drained and unable to catch up.

=== Global impacts ===
A study from Singapore showed that healthcare workers caring for patients with COVID-19 reported anxiety, depression and stress. Increasing work demands on healthcare professionals conflict with their duties to family and friends, which causes psychological stress. Healthcare professionals reported being anxious about having to self-isolate, quarantine or becoming ill. For healthcare workers, being quarantined was positively associated with minimizing direct contact with patients and not reporting to work.

An Italian nurse committed suicide after being traumatized trying to save the lives of those with COVID-19.

In Mexico, healthcare professional have also reported high levels of anxiety, because of the fear of being an asymptomatic patient, which could potentially lead to the unknowingly spread of the disease amongst their patients and their families.

Healthcare workers like nurses, doctors and other medical staff that worked on the front-lines in China experienced symptoms of anxiety, depression and difficulty sleeping. More specifically, about 46.04% had anxiety, 44.37% had depression, and 28.75% experienced insomnia. In Wuhan, China, over 70% of healthcare workers reported psychological distress.

In India, during the peak of the second wave of COVID-19, a before-after image of an Indian doctor named Dr. Sohil Makwana wearing a PPE kit and drenched in sweat after removing the PPE kit went viral internationally. That image represented the condition of all doctors and frontline workers, and it created awareness about how cumbersome for doctors to work for unrealistically long hours inside PPE kits amid the rapid second wave of the coronavirus pandemic. The image clearly resonated with many, as it was retweeted nearly 17,000 times and received more than 132,000 likes.

=== Violence against healthcare workers ===
Healthcare workers have been subjected to violent crimes, such as assault. Hospitals and governments have taken stricter measures to ensure the safety of their staff; however, many healthcare workers still face significant risk of physical injury.

Because of COVID-19, healthcare personnel have experienced over 600 instances of negativity directed towards them in different forms. In Pakistan, doctors were attacked by family members of a deceased patient who succumbed to COVID-19. Residents of a community in Bangladesh forced a doctor who was COVID-19 positive and his family to leave his home and the area by throwing bricks at their home.

Research has shown that Egyptian healthcare workers reported high rates of verbal assault in the midst of the COVID-19 pandemic. With 93% of participants who reported violence having experienced verbal violence, and a 65.4% of reporting healthcare workings identifying as female.

=== Ethical decisions ===
The Conversation reports that healthcare workers will have to face 'moral injury' for making difficult decisions such as moving a patient off the ventilator or refusing an ICU bed due to limited resources. COVID-19 has forced healthcare workers to make many difficult ethical decisions. These include concerns for the safety of spreading COVID-19 to their families since the risk is higher when they work and care for COVID-19 patients, deciding how to distribute limited resources such as ventilators among many patients who all need it, and deciding at what point healthcare workers should stay home instead of continue to go to work if they suspect they might have been exposed to COVID-19.

Two studies have shown that nurses during the pandemic are facing extreme stress. Nurses are experiencing one of the highest rates of occupational stress compared to other professions. COVID-19 has changed the way nurses care for patients, many patients needed to have virtual appointments rather than face to face care because of nurses caring for patients with COVID-19. This also has been shown in several studies that isolation meant that nurses could not go home to their loved ones, making that a virtual experience too. They feared that they would infect their loved ones at home, so many did not see their families for extended periods of time. Many nurses stated that they feel unsafe in their work environment, risking their own health, and a lack of support by their organization.

== Impact on staff ==
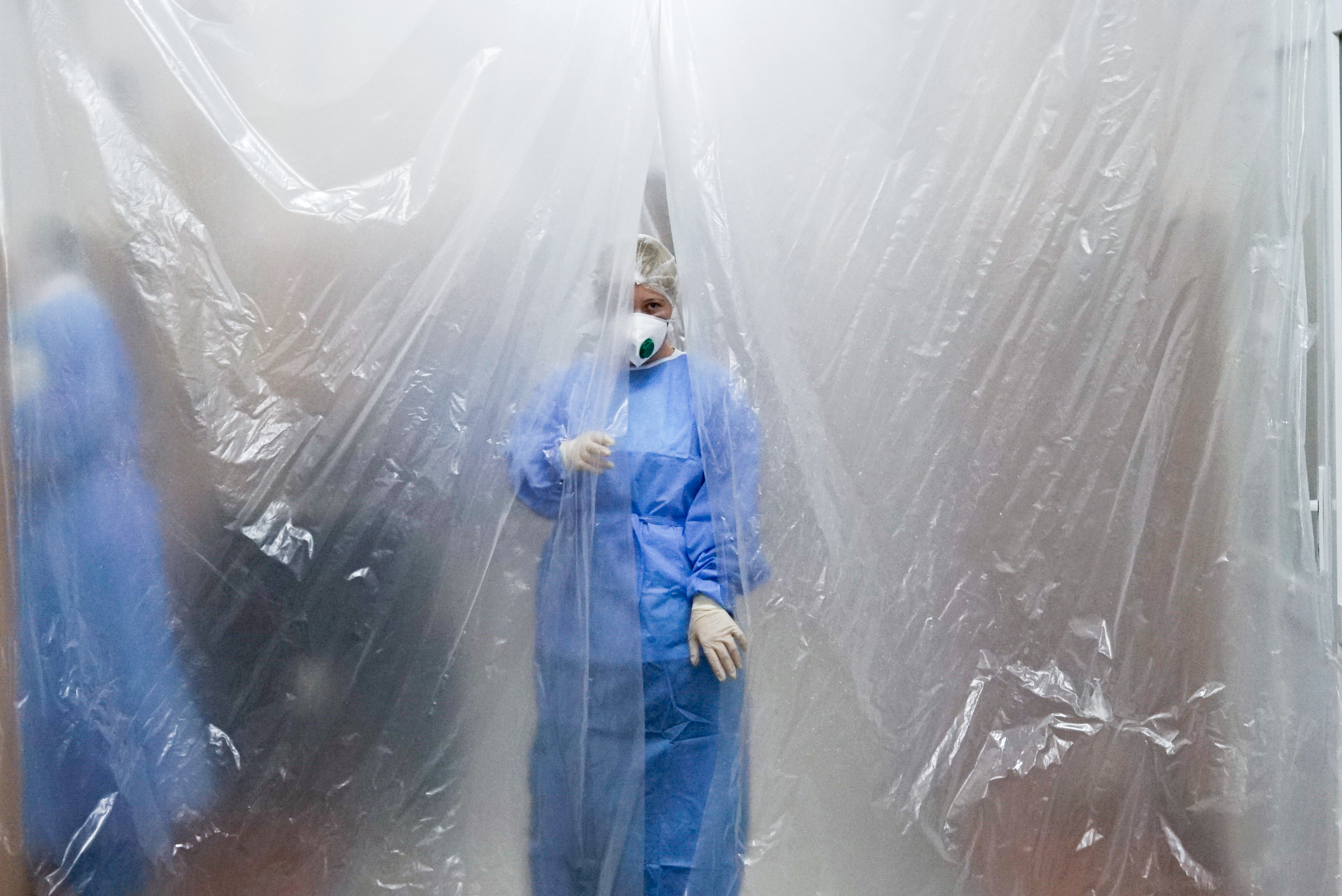
Healthcare worker during the pandemic in Chernivtsi, Ukraine

=== Female staff ===
Globally, women make up 70 percent of workers in the health and social sector. Women are playing a disproportionate role in responding to the disease, whether that be as front line healthcare workers, careers at home or community leaders and mobilisers. In some countries, COVID-19 infections among female health workers are twice that of their male counterparts. Women are still paid much less than their male counterparts in almost all countries and hold fewer leadership positions in the health sector. Masks and other protective equipment designed and sized for men leave women at greater risk of exposure.

During the COVID-19 pandemic, rates of burnout are higher in female healthcare workers than male workers. The percentage of females enduring anxiety while working in healthcare if over twice as much as males. Female healthcare workers were 55% more likely to report burnout compared to their male coworkers.

=== All staff ===
The pandemic caused the nursing community a lot of stress. A national cross-sectional survey found that "71.4% of doctors and 74.4% of nurses experienced moderate-to-severe perceived stress". In another Covid based study, the nurses all share common themes that include, working over hours, fear of contraction, limited supplies, endless patients, and self-sacrifice. Similarly in a cross-sectional survey, the researchers concluded that a high percentage of the resilient nurses surveyed report high-stress levels and/or PTSD symptoms. The survey also identifies eight major themes, "revealed from nurses' free-text responses: (a) working in an isolated environment, (b) PPE shortage and the discomfort of pronged usage, (c) sleep problems, (d) intensity of workload, (e) cultural and language barriers, (f) lack of family support, (g) fear of being infected, and (h) insufficient work experiences with COVID-19" A lot of these concerns are a direct result or exacerbated by the COVID-19 pandemic. The recent shortage of nurses has caused a nursing burnout which is affecting individuals and their workloads. Nurses are having an increase level of stress and mental disorders due to the increase in workload and number of patients they are getting.

Health care workers have experienced physical and mental health side effects because of the COVID-19 pandemic. Common mental health conditions include PTSD (post traumatic stress disorder), depression, anxiety disorders, and stress disorders. These mental side effects caused difficulties amongst health care workers not only during the pandemic, but also after the pandemic was considered over. Healthcare workers experienced tremendous amounts of stress during the pandemic which had effects on mental and physical health.

== Recommendations ==
=== World Health Organization ===
The World Health Organization has given the following key recommendations to decrease the spread of COVID-19 among healthcare workers:

- Training healthcare workers to identify respiratory diseases
- Providing increased access to personal protective equipment
- Providing psychological support to health workers
- Routinely conducting hospital surveillance
- Recognizing that every healthcare system can have gaps

=== Centers for Disease Control and Prevention ===
The Centers for Disease Control and Prevention has issued guidance on preventing transmission and reducing job stress in response to the COVID-19 pandemic for healthcare workers:

==== Infection prevention ====
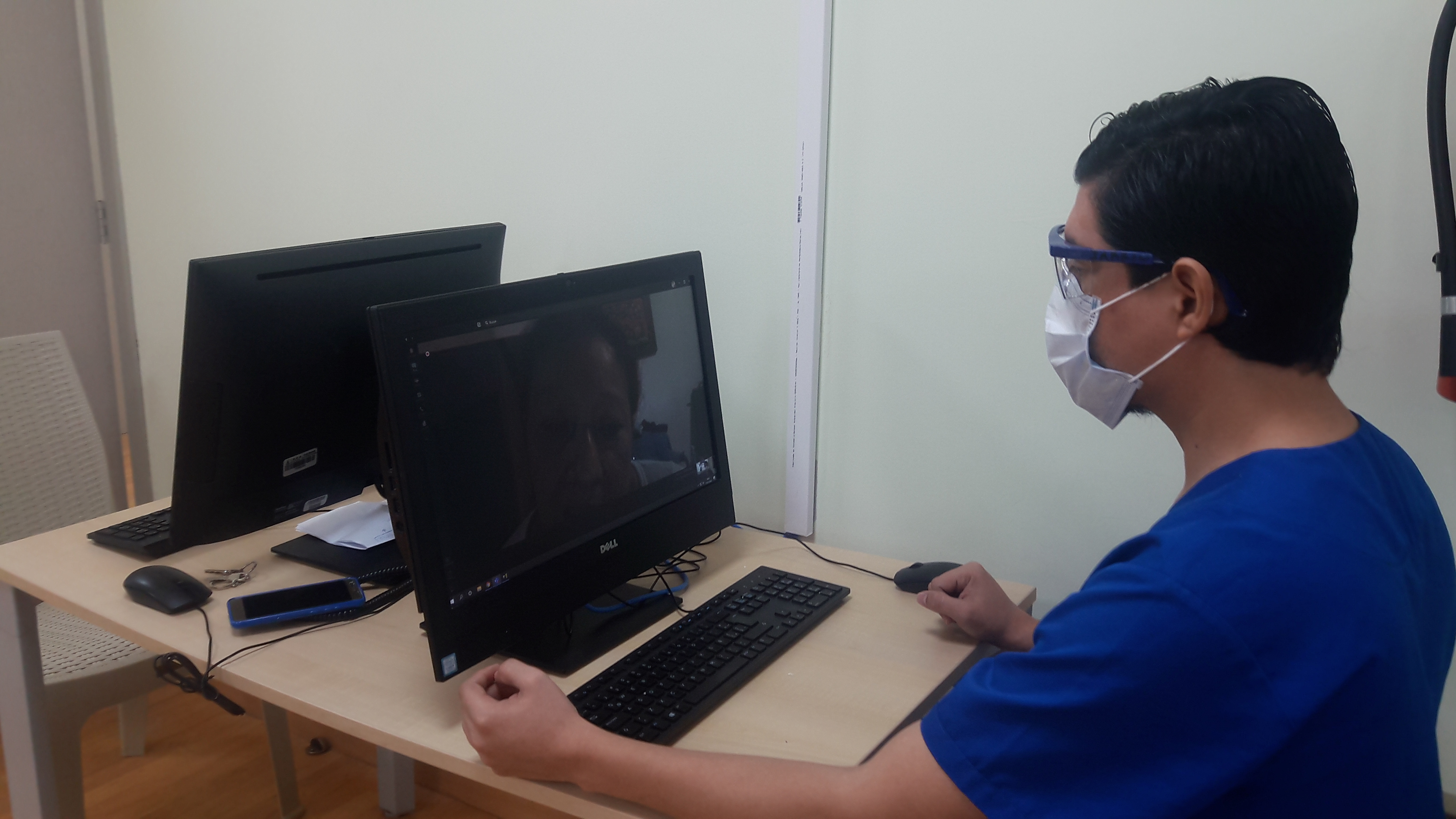
- Doctor assisting patient via telehealth consultation
  Implement telehealth protocols where possible
- Screen ever one entering a healthcare facility for COVID-19 symptoms
- Use appropriate face coverings dependent upon the procedure (i.e. N95s for aerosol-generating procedures)
- Establish a plan to identify and track suspected and confirmed cases to promptly impose quarantine measures
- Re-arrange waiting areas and install barriers to encourage physical distancing
- Practice hand hygiene and frequent disinfection of surfaces

==== Managing job stress ====
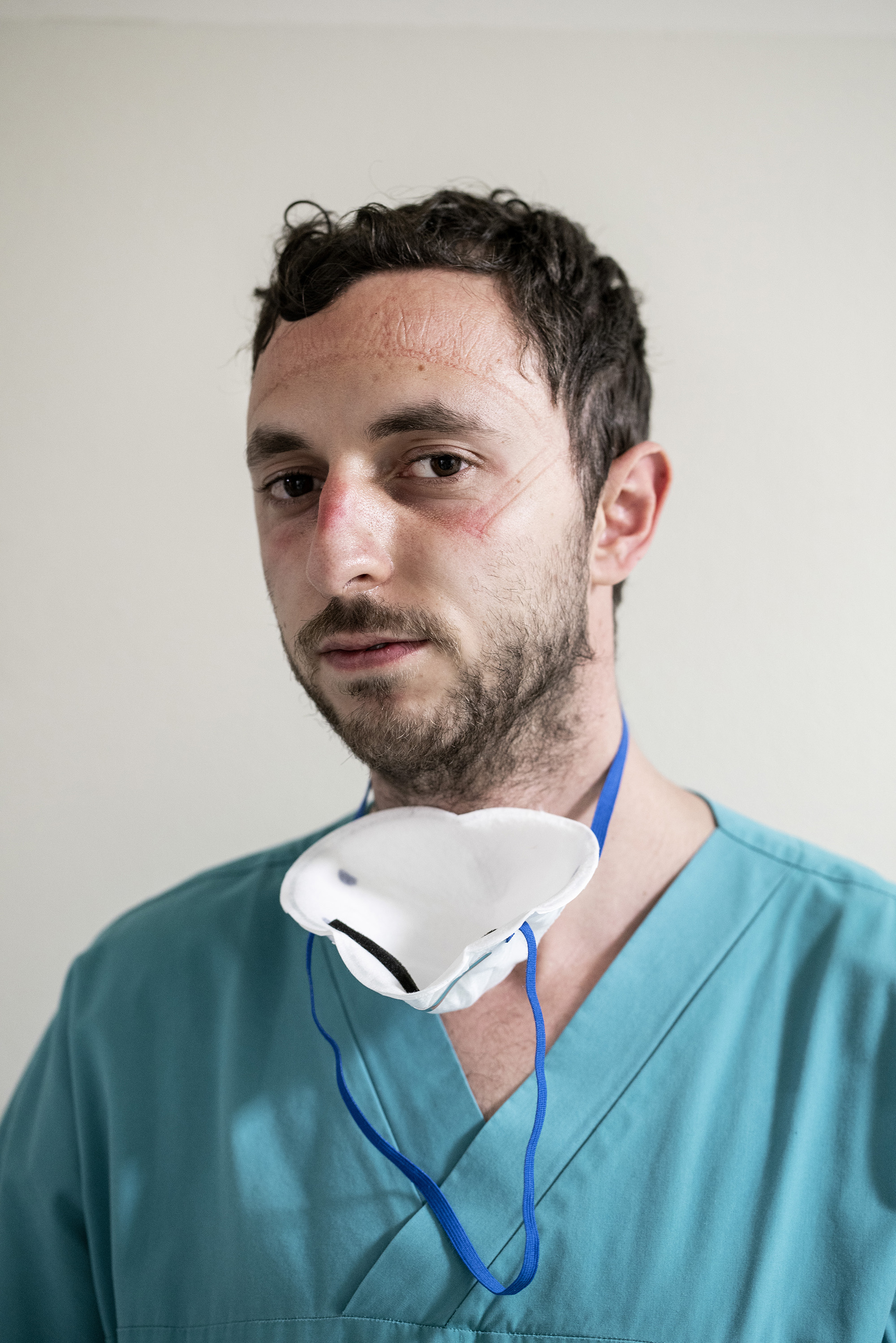
A nurse anesthetist at the San Salvatore Hospital in Pesaro, Italy, at the end of his shift on March 18, 2020

A 2020 Cochrane review found that among healthcare workers there is low certainty evidence that resilience training may lead to greater levels of individual resilience for healthcare workers. Due to limitations in the reviewed studies (44 RCTs), the authors advise caution in drawing definitive conclusions and recommend more studies with improved designs.

Other recommendations:

- Stay in communication with coworkers and supervisors about job stress
- Maintain a consistent sleep and meal schedule
- Eat healthy foods
- Develop healthy coping mechanisms
- Get exercise and make time for hobbies outside of work
- Take breaks from watching, reading, and listening to the news
- Practice mindfulness techniques, such as breathing exercises and meditation
- Talk to a mental health professional if needed
- Technology (online counseling) can provide physiological support in order to reduce the risk of insomnia, anxiety, and depression/burnout.

=== UNFPA ===
UNFPA recommends that all women and girls must have access to a continuum of sexual and reproductive health services. In accordance to national guidelines and standards, some services for women and girls include antenatal, perinatal and postnatal care, and screening tests.

=== Karolinska Institute ===
The Karolinska Institute recommends health workers to take care of oneself, avoid unhelpful strategies, stay in touch with loved ones, not blame oneself and reach out if physical or psychological help is required.

== Sources ==
This article incorporates text from a free content work. Licensed under CC BY-SA 3.0 IGO (license statement/permission). Text taken from Explainer: How COVID-19 impacts women and girls, UN Women.
