= St. Charles Medical Center – Redmond =

St. Charles Medical Center - Redmond
- St. Charles Health System

Geography
- Location: Redmond, Oregon, United States
- Coordinates: 44.2880°N 121.1702°W

Organization
- Care system: Public

Services
- Emergency department: Level III trauma center
- Beds: 48

Links
- Website: St. Charles Redmond
- Lists: Hospitals in Oregon

St. Charles Medical Center – Redmond is a hospital in Redmond, Oregon, United States. It is a level 3 trauma center. St. Charles medical center [SCMC-R] is owned and operated by St. Charles Health System, Inc. (SCHS), a private, not-for-profit Oregon corporation. SCHS also owns and operates the Bend, Madras, and Prineville locations.

== History ==
Central Oregon District Hospital opened on July 1, 1952. On January 1, 2001, Central Oregon District Hospital and St. Charles Medical center merged to create Cascade Healthcare Services. Later renamed to Cascade Healthcare Community, inc. As part of the merger the hospital was renamed to Central Oregon Community Hospital. In 2003 the hospital's name was changed again to the current St. Charles Medical Center Redmond.

== See also ==
- List of hospitals in Oregon
