= Thomas J. Hennen (bishop) =

American Catholic prelate (born 1978)

His Excellency, The Most Reverend Thomas J. Hennen
- Bishop of Baker
- Church: Latin Church
- Diocese: Baker
- Appointed: July 10, 2025
- Installed: September 29, 2025
- Predecessor: Liam Cary

Orders
- Ordination: July 10, 2004 by William Edwin Franklin
- Consecration: September 29, 2025 by Alexander Sample, Liam Cary and Dennis G. Walsh

Personal details
- Born: July 4, 1978 (age 48) Ottumwa, Iowa, US
- Education: St. Ambrose University; Pontifical Gregorian University; Pontifical Alphonsian Academy
- Motto: Via, Veritas, Vita (Latin for 'The Way, The Truth, The Life')
- Styles
- Reference style: His Excellency; The Most Reverend
- Spoken style: Your Excellency
- Religious style: Bishop

Thomas Joseph Hennen (born July 4, 1978) is an American Catholic prelate who serves as Bishop of Baker.

== Biography ==
=== Early life and education ===
Hennen was born on July 4, 1978, in Ottumwa, Iowa, to (the late) John and Joan Hennen. He is the youngest of 11 children. He received a bachelor's degree in history and philosophy from St. Ambrose University in Davenport, Iowa. Hennen went to Rome to continue his studies while residing at the Pontifical North American College. He earned a Bachelor of Sacred Theology degree from the Pontifical Gregorian University in 2003.

=== Priesthood ===
Hennen was ordained a priest at Sacred Heart Cathedral in Davenport by Bishop William Franklin for the Diocese of Davenport on July 10, 2004. He earned a Licentiate of Sacred Theology in 2005 from the Pontifical Alphonsian Academy in Rome.

After his return from Rome, the diocese assigned Hennen in 2005 as parochial vicar at Prince of Peace Parish in Clinton, Iowa. He was reassigned in 2010 as a campus minister and as parochial vicar of St. Mary's Parish in Iowa City. After one year, the diocese named Hennen as its director of vocations. He was also appointed in 2014 as chaplain and theology teacher at Assumption High School in Davenport.

In 2017 Hennen was assigned as chaplain and director of campus ministry at St. Ambrose University in Davenport. He was named a diocesan consultor and the vicar general in 2020. From 2021 to 2025, Hennen served as priest moderator of St. Andrew Parish in Blue Grass, Iowa, and pastor and rector of Sacred Heart Cathedral.

In addition to his pastoral and administrative assignments, Hennen served on a committee established by Bishop Thomas Zinkula that drafted a diocesan policy regarding sexual and gender identity issues. Beginning in January 2023, he wrote the Question Box column for the diocesan paper, The Catholic Messenger.

=== Bishop of Baker ===
On July 10, 2025, Pope Leo XIV named Hennen the seventh bishop of Baker. He was ordained and installed by Archbishop Alexander Sample of Portland in Oregon on September 29, 2025, at St. Francis of Assisi Church in Bend, Oregon. Bishop Emeritus Liam Cary of Baker and Bishop Dennis Walsh of Davenport served as the principal co-consecrators. At the time of his ordination, Hennen was the youngest sitting American Catholic bishop.

Catholic Church titles
| Preceded by Liam Carey | Bishop of Baker; 2025–Present | Succeeded by Incumbent |
