= Saint Francis de Sales Cathedral (Baker City, Oregon) =

Catholic cathedral in Oregon, US

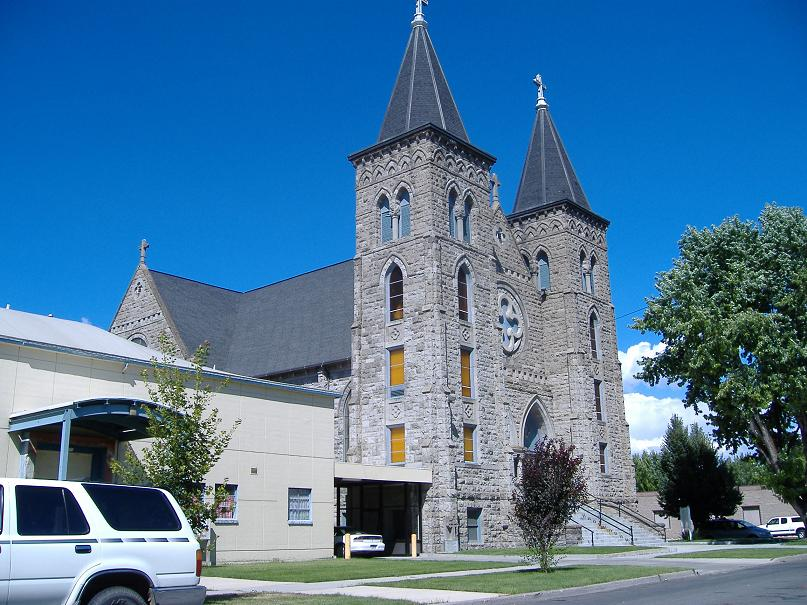

- Location in Oregon Saint Francis de Sales Cathedral (the United States)
- 44°46′46″N 117°49′52″W
- Location: 2235 First Street; Baker City, Oregon
- Country: United States
- Denomination: Catholic Church
- Sui iuris church: Latin Church
- Website: www.saintfranciscathedral.com

History
- Dedicated: April 9, 1908

Architecture
- Architect: John Virginius Bennes
- Style: Gothic Revival
- Groundbreaking: 1906
- Completed: 1908

Specifications
- Materials: Volcanic tuff

Administration
- Diocese: Baker

Clergy
- Bishop: Most Rev. Thomas Hennen
- Rector: Rev. Suresh Kumar Telagani
- St. Francis Cathedral; St. Francis Rectory
- U.S. Historic district – Contributing property
- Part of: Baker Historic District (ID78002277)
- Added to NRHP: December 14, 1978

Saint Francis de Sales Cathedral is a Catholic cathedral and parish church located in Baker City, Oregon, United States. Completed in 1908, it is the seat of the Diocese of Baker. The cathedral church and the parish rectory were included as contributing properties in the Baker Historic District, listed on the National Register of Historic Places, in 1978.

== History ==
The first Catholic services in Baker City were held in October 1862 in a building that the church bought for that purpose. A frame building was erected for a church in 1871 on the site of the present cathedral. The Diocese of Baker City, later shortened to Baker, was created in 1903, and St. Francis de Sales Church was elevated to cathedral status. The present cathedral was constructed from 1906 to 1908. The rectory was built at the same time as the cathedral, but it was completed a year earlier in 1907. Stained glass windows were installed in 1923, 1958, and 1965. The diocesan chancery was added to the north side of the church covering the lower part of the apse in the 1960s. The cathedral was renovated on several occasions, most recently in mid-2007.

== Architecture ==
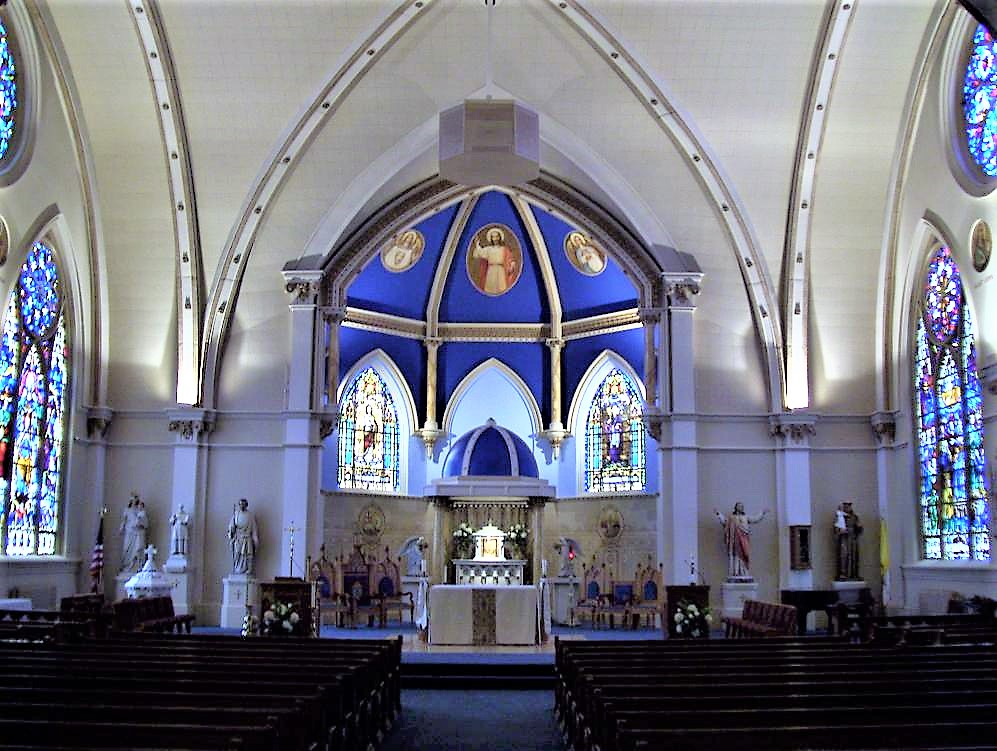
Interior of the cathedral

The cathedral is a Gothic Revival structure that follows a basilican plan without side aisles. It is composed of local volcanic tuff that is rock-faced, rusticated, and ashlar in regular courses. The main facade is flanked by two towers of equal height that are capped with octagon-shaped spires and crosses. A rose window is located in the middle of the main facade above the double entryway. The main nave features three pointed-arch windows on each elevation between buttresses on the exterior. The transept has two larger pointed-arch windows below a rose window on both elevations. Two more pointed-arch windows are located in the apse.

The rectory, which also served as the bishop's house, is composed of volcanic tuff, and it is laid in the same manner as the cathedral. The 2½-story structure is built on a raised foundation. It features a gable roof with dormers and a front porch. A garage was added on the west side in 1960.

The former chancery building is composed of volcanic tuff like the cathedral and the rectory, but it is randomly laid and it does not have the proportion of the other two. It is capped with a flat roof, and its windows and hardware reference the era it was built.

== Renovations ==
The first renovation of the cathedral happened in 1944, when stenciled designs were painted in the sanctuary and apse. In 1958, during the second renovation, the main altar was preserved, but the stenciling was covered up and two sacristies were removed. During the third renovation in 1980, a screen was installed in the sanctuary and the tabernacle moved to the side. The fourth renovation began in 2007.

== See also ==
- List of Catholic cathedrals in the United States
- List of cathedrals in the United States
- Francis de Sales

== Notes and references ==
=== References ===
- Baker County Friends of the Library (2002). Historic Baker City, Oregon. Arcadia Publishing. ISBN 978-0-738-52070-4.
