= St. Charles Medical Center – Bend =

Hospital in Bend, Oregon, US

St. Charles Medical Center - Bend
- St. Charles Health System

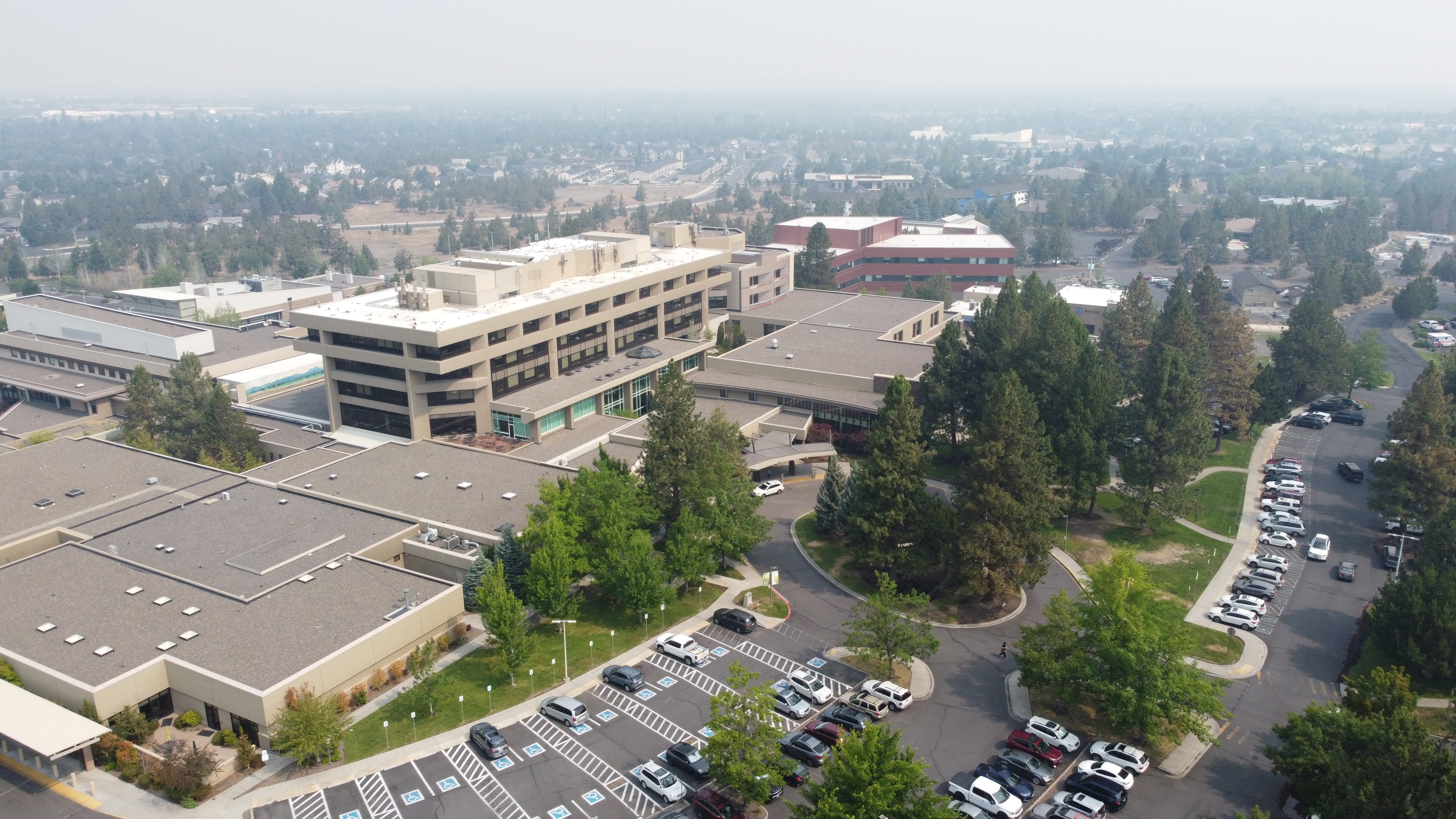
- St. Charles Medical Center in July, 2024.

Geography
- Location: Bend, Oregon, US
- Coordinates: 44.0672°N 121.2690°W

Organisation
- Care system: Public

Services
- Emergency department: Yes
- Beds: 226

Links
- Website: St. Charles Bend

St. Charles Medical Center – Bend is a hospital in Bend, Oregon, United States. It is the largest hospital in Central Oregon, and a level 2 trauma center. St. Charles medical center [SCMC-B] is owned and operated by St. Charles Health System, Inc. (SCHS), a private, not-for-profit Oregon corporation. SCHS also owns and operates the St. Charles Medical Center - Redmond.

== History ==
The first Hospital in Bend named St. Charles was built in 1922 on "Hospital Hill" located in downtown Bend. The building was named in honor of Bishop Charles Joseph O'Reilly, the first bishop of the Roman Catholic Diocese of Baker. This building was to replace a house at 930 Broadway that the Sisters of St. Joseph of Tipton, Indiana were using for medical facilities.

In 1951 a more modern facility was built on the Hospital Hill site.

In 1972 the Sisters of St. Joseph transferred the assets of the hospital to a new not for profit corporation called St. Charles Memorial Hospital Inc.

On October 12, 1975, the new St. Charles Medical Center was dedicated. In March 1977 the old St. Charles Memorial Hospital building was demolished.

on January 1, 2001, Central Oregon District Hospital and St. Charles Medical Center merged to create Cascade Healthcare Services, later renamed to Cascade Healthcare Community, Inc.

On February 15, 2010, the Catholic Diocese of Baker announced its intention to dissolve the official sponsorship relationship of St. Charles Medical Center-Bend by the Catholic Church. As part of the announcement both the Church and CHC said "very little will change at St. Charles Bend as a result of this decision. However, Catholic Mass will no longer be celebrated in the hospital's chapel, and all items considered Catholic will be removed from the hospital and returned to the church." The dissolution of the Church's sponsorship ended a 92-year relationship.

== See also ==
- List of hospitals in Oregon
- St. Charles Health System
