= Timeline of strikes in 2021 =

Strikes in 2021

A number of labour strikes were held throughout 2021.

== Background ==
A labour strike is a work stoppage, caused by the mass refusal of employees to work, usually in response to employee grievances, such as low pay or poor working conditions. Strikes can also take place to demonstrate solidarity with workers in other workplaces or to pressure governments to change policies. Since the advent of the COVID-19 pandemic in 2021, a number of strikes have occurred in responses to social injustices and poor conditions highlighted by the impact of the pandemic.

== Timeline ==
=== Continuing strikes that begun before 2021 ===
- 2020–21 Alabama aluminum plant strike
- 2018–2021 Haitian protests
- 2020–2021 Indian farmers' protest
- 2020–2021 Peruvian agrarian strike
- 2020–2021 Rolls-Royce Barnoldswick strikes
- 2020–2021 women's strike protests in Poland

=== January ===
- 2021 Bolivian doctors' strike;
- 2021 British Gas strike, dispute between workers represented by the GMB and British Gas over fire-and-rehire policies across the United Kingdom;
- 2021 French labor protests, protests against the country's economic and employment conditions in the wake of the COVID-19 pandemic and proposed laws that would give greater powers to police;
- 2021 Hunts Point Produce Market strike, dispute between produce handlers and delivery drivers represented by Teamsters and the Hunts Point Produce Market in New York City, United States;
- 2021 St. Paul Park refinery strike dispute between oil refinery workers represented by the International Brotherhood of Teamsters and Marathon Petroleum in Minnesota, United States;
- 2021 South Korean delivery workers strikes;

=== February ===
- 2021 Go North West strike, dispute between bus drivers represented by Unite the Union and Go North West in Greater Manchester, England;
- Media Without Choice
- 2021 Myanmar protests, part of the opposition to the 2021 Myanmar coup d'état;
- 2021 São Paulo teachers strike;
- 2021 Tunisair strike;

=== March ===
- 2021 Allegheny Technologies strike, dispute between workers represented by United Steelworkers and Allegheny Technologies Incorporated in the Northern United States;
- 2021 Amazon strikes;
- 2021 Columbia University strike, dispute between graduate students represented by the Graduate Workers of Columbia–United Auto Workers and Columbia University in New York City, United States;
- 2021 Manitoba hydro strike;
- 2021 St. Charles Bend strike, dispute between technical workers represented by the Oregon Federation of Nurses and Health Professionals and the St. Charles Medical Center – Bend in Oregon, United States;
- 2021 Saint Vincent Hospital strike, dispute between nurses represented by the Massachusetts Nurses Association and Saint Vincent Hospital in Worcester, United States;
- Spectrum Strike;

=== April ===
- 2021 DVLA strike;
- 2021 Minas Gerais prostitute strike, strike by sex workers represented by the Associação das Prostitutas de Minas Gerais to pressure the Brazilian Ministry of Health into categorizing sex workers among priority groups for immunization against COVID-19;
- 2021 Olymel strike, dispute between meatpackers represented by the Confédération des syndicats nationaux and Olymel in Québec, Canada;
- 2021 New York University strike
- 2021 Oregon Tech strike, dispute between faculty members represented by the American Association of University Professors and the Oregon Institute of Technology in the United States;
- 2021 Port of Montreal strike;
- 2021 Thurrock bin strike, dispute between bin workers represented by Unite the Union and Thurrock Council in England;
- 2021 Warrior Met Coal strike, dispute between workers represented by the United Mine Workers of America and Warrior Met Coal Inc. in Alabama, United States;
- 2021 Virginia Volvo Trucks strike, dispute between workers represented by United Auto Workers and Volvo Trucks in Virginia, United States;

=== May ===
- 2021 American McDonalds strikes;
- May 2021 Palestinian general strike;
- 2021 Ugandan nurses strikes;
- 2021 University of Liverpool strike;

=== June ===
- 2021 Aotearoa nurses strike, dispute between nurses represented by the New Zealand Nurses Organisation and the government of Aotearoa;
- 2021 Cook County nurses strike
- 2021 Danish nurses strike, dispute between nurses represented by the Danish Nurses' Organization and the Danish Ministry of Health;
- 2021 Europe 1 strike;
- 2021 Gorillas strikes, dispute between delivery workers represented by the Gorillas Workers Collective and Gorillas across Germany;
- 2021 Iran workers' strike;
- 2021 Vale strike;

=== July ===
- 2021 French airport strikes;
- 2021 Frito-Lay strike, dispute between workers represented by the Bakery, Confectionery, Tobacco Workers and Grain Millers' International Union and Frito-Lay in Kansas, United States;
- Hartal Doktor Kontrak, protest by doctors against the Malaysian government's contract system in appointing medical officers;
- 2021 Kitimat smelter strike, dispute between workers represented by Unifor and Rio Tinto in British Columbia, Canada;
- 2021 Korean Confederation of Trade Unions strike;
- 2021 Puerto Rico truck drivers strike;
- 2021 Zhanaozen strike;

=== August ===
- 2021 Canadian border officials strike, dispute between border officials represented by the Public Service Alliance of Canada and the Canada Border Services Agency;
- 2021 German national rail strike, dispute between rail workers represented by the Gewerkschaft Deutscher Lokomotivführer and Deutsche Bahn across Germany;
- 2021 Mexican gas strike;
- 2021 Nabisco strike, dispute between workers represented by the Bakery, Confectionery, Tobacco Workers and Grain Millers' International Union and Nabisco across the United States;
- 2021 Nigerian doctors' strike, dispute between doctors represented by the Nigerian Association of Resident Doctors and the Federal government of Nigeria;
- 2021 Québec ferry strike;

=== September ===
- 2021 Aix-Marseille-Provence bin strike;
- 2021 Bergams factory strike, dispute between workers represented by the General Confederation of Labor - Workers' Force and Bergams in Essonne, France;
- 2021 French midwives strike;
- 2021 Heaven Hill strike, dispute between workers represented by United Food and Commercial Workers and the Heaven Hill bourbon whiskey distillery in Kentucky, United States;
- 2021 Jussieu University strike, dispute between the university's cleaning workers represented by the General Confederation of Labour and the subcontracted Arc En Ciel company;
- 2021 Norwegian cultural workers strike, dispute between cultural workers represented by LO Stat and Arbeidsgiverforeningen Spekter across Norway;
- 2021 Ontario optometrists job action;
- 2021 Paraguayan doctors strike
- 2021 Québec daycares strike;
- 2021 San Antonio Symphony strike;
- 2021 Spanish national rail strike;
- 2021 UK Uber strike;
- 2021 Washington state carpenters strike

=== October ===
- 2021 Brighton bin strike, dispute between bin workers represented by the GMB and the Brighton and Hove City Council in England;
- 2020–2021 H&M Le Bourget strike
- 2021 Italian taxi strike;
- 2021 John Deere strike, dispute between workers represented by United Auto Workers and John Deere across the United States;
- 2021 Kellogg's strike, dispute between workers represented by the Bakery, Confectionery, Tobacco Workers and Grain Millers' International Union and Kellogg's across the United States;
- 2021 Mercy Hospital strike, dispute between nurses and hospital workers represented by the Communications Workers of America and Catholic Health in New York, United States;
- 2021 Netflix walkout, walkout by some Netflix workers over the company's response to the controversy surrounding the comedy special The Closer;
- 2021 New Brunswick public sector strike;
- 2021 New York taxi drivers hunger strike;
- October 2021 Italian general strike;
- 2021 Puerto Rico police strike;
- 2021 São Paulo delivery workers strikes;
- 2021 South African metalworkers strike, dispute between metalworkers represented by the National Union of Metalworkers of South Africa as well as the Metal and Electrical Workers' Union of South Africa and the Steel and Engineering Industries Federation of Southern Africa;
- 2021 Stagecoach strikes, dispute between bus drivers represented by Unite the Union or the National Union of Rail, Maritime and Transport Workers and the Stagecoach Group across the United Kingdom;

=== November ===
- 2021 Cádiz metalworkers strike;
- 2021 Foodpanda strike;
- 2021 Glasgow bin strike;
- 2021 Scranton teachers strike;
- 2021 University of Manitoba strike;
- 2021 Weetabix strike;
- 2021 Windsor Salt strike;

== Averted strikes ==
A number of strike actions were voted on and approved by workers throughout 2021, but were called off before the action could begin:

- 2021 IATSE strike;
- 2021 Icelandic air traffic controllers labour dispute;
- 2021 Kaiser Permanente labor dispute;
- 2021 South Korea healthcare workers labour dispute;
- 2021 University of California labour dispute;

== See also ==
- Great Resignation
- List of strikes
