= List of strikes in Germany =

Throughout the history of Germany, a number of strikes, labour disputes, student strikes, hunger strikes, and other industrial actions have occurred.

== Background ==
A labour strike is a work stoppage caused by the mass refusal of employees to work. This can include wildcat strikes, which are done without union authorisation, and slowdown strikes, where workers reduce their productivity while still carrying out minimal working duties. It is usually a response to employee grievances, such as low pay or poor working conditions. Strikes can also occur to demonstrate solidarity with workers in other workplaces or pressure governments to change policies.

== 20th century ==
=== 1910s ===
- 1916 Berlin strike, against the detention of Karl Liebknecht.
- German strike of January 1918, against World War I.
- German revolution of 1918–1919
- Berlin March Battles, in 1919.
- First Silesian Uprising, including a general strike, in 1919.
- Spartacist uprising, including strikes, in 1919.

=== 1920s ===
- Ruhr uprising, in 1920.
- Cuno strikes, in 1923.

=== 1930s ===
- 1932 Berlin transport strike

=== 1940s ===
- 1947 Ruhr miners' strike, strike by miners in the Ruhr, West Germany.
- 1949 East German State Railway strike

=== 1950s ===
- East German uprising of 1953

=== 1970s ===
- 1973 Ford Germany strikes, de, wildcat strikes at Ford Germany.
- 1978–79 West German steelworkers' strike

=== 1980s ===
- 1980 Berlin S-Bahn strike
- 1980 West German journalists strike, by journalists in West Germany demanding a 40-hour work week.
- 1984 West Germany metalworkers' strike, 7-week strike by metalworkers in West Germany, represented by IG Metall, calling for the introduction of a 35-hour work week.

=== 1990s ===
- 1990 East German rail strike
- 1993 East German steelworkers' strike
- Frauenstreik 1994, the first national women's strike in Germany.
- 1994 German postal strike, over privatisation.
- 1996 German public sector strike, against austerity.
- 1998 German internet strike

== 21st century ==
=== 2000s ===
- 2007 German national rail strike

=== 2010s ===
- 2018 German metalworkers strike, organised by IG Metall, calling for improved work-life balance.

=== 2020s ===
- 2021 German national rail strike
- 2021 Gorillas strikes, by Gorillas delivery workers.
- 2023 German public transport strike
- 2023 Thüringer Waldquell strike;
- 2024 Lufthansa strikes
