= List of health and medical strikes =

The following is a list of health and medical strikes:

== 20th century ==
- Hôpital Notre-Dame anti-Jewish strike – 1934
- Saskatchewan doctors' strike – 1962
- Belgium physicians' and dentists' strike in 1964, April 1 to April 18, 1964
- Quebec specialist doctors strike – October 10, 1970
- UK consultants' strike – January to April 1975
- USA California physicians strike May 1975
- UK junior doctors' strike – November 1975
- Alberta Nurses Strike – 1982
- Israel – 1983
- Australian nurses 50-day strike – 1986
- Manitoba Nurses Strike – 1991
- Sweden – Doctors strike 1994

== 21st century ==
=== 2001 ===
- Finland – historical five-month strike

=== 2003 ===
- Scottish Nursery Nurses Strike – 2003-2004

=== 2006 ===
- Germany – Doctors' strike March 2006
- New Zealand – 15–20 June 2006

=== 2009 ===
- Switzerland – Vaud and Geneva cantons – March 2009

=== 2010 ===
- Sudanese Doctors' Strike – March 2010

=== 2012 ===
- Germany – Doctors' strike March 2012
- India – nationwide strike June 2012

=== 2013 ===
- UK Save our A&E (Lewisham) – January 2013
- Jamaica Junior Medical Doctors April 2013

=== 2014 ===
- England (UK) NHS Pay Strike – September 2014

=== 2015 ===
- UK Midwives Strike – January 2015
- Northern Ireland Midwives Strike – April 2015
- Brazil – Resident doctors strike – September and December 2015
- England – Junior Doctors' Strikes – November 2015
- France – Doctors' strike – 18 November 2015
- UK NHS Student Protest – December 2015

=== 2016 ===
- UK NHS Student Protest – January 2016
- England Junior Doctors' Strikes – January to April 2016
- Peru doctors' strike – 17 February 2016
- England Junior Doctors' Strikes – March 2016
- Kenya doctors strike December 5, 2016
- Sudan Doctors strike October and November

=== 2019 ===
- Sudan Doctors strike January.
- 2019 Indian Doctors' strike.
- 2019 UCSF Medical Residents Walk Off.
- 2019 University of Washington resident's strike: 80-hour weeks, bad pay, exhaustion.
- 2019 Hospitals' strike in Lebanon

=== 2020 ===
- 2020 Hong Kong Hospital Workers to Strike Over Coronavirus
- 2020 South Korean junior doctors and medical students go on strike to protest medical reform plan
- 2020 University of Illinois Hospital strikes
- 2020 United States, Washington physicians and advanced providers of the Union of American Physicians and Dentists (UAPD) go on strike over unsafe working conditions at MultiCare Indigo Urgent Care clinics

=== 2021 ===
- 2021 Bolivian doctors' strike
- 2021 St. Charles Bend strike
- 2021 Saint Vincent Hospital strike
- 2021 Nigerian doctors strike
- 2021 New Zealand nurses strike
- Malaysian contract doctors' strike
- 2021 Danish Nurses' strike (Sygeplejerskestrejken 2021)

=== 2022 ===
- UK 2022 National Health Service strikes

=== 2024 ===
- 2024 South Korean medical crisis
- 2024 Indian doctors' protest due to rape and murder of on duty doctor within R.G.Kar Medical College.
