= 2021 Olymel strike =

Strike by Olymel meatpackers in Vallée-Jonction, Québec, Canada in 2021

The 2021 Olymel strike was a strike by meatpackers working for Olymel in Vallée-Jonction, Québec, Canada from April to August 2021.

== Background ==
Olymel is a Canadian meat packing food processing company, a producer of pork and poultry products. It employs more than 10,000 people and exports its products to more than 60 countries. The products are sold under the Olymel, Lafleur, Flamingo, Prince, Galco and La Fernandière brands. In 2006–2007, the company had a labor dispute with the CSN union.

In Vallée-Jonction, Québec, Olymel operates a pork slaughterhouse, one of the largest in the province. The slaughterhouse employs around 1150 workers and typically handles around 35,000 pigs per week.

== Strike ==
As the expiry of the collective bargaining agreement drew near in early 2021, workers at the factory in Vallée-Jonction raised a number of concerns surrounding salaries and working conditions, including low pay, understaffing, and very high turnover rates. Another source of discontent was the resolution of the events of 2006–2007, which had seen workers receive a pay cut of 38%, as well as reductions in pensions and sick days. As well, in February 2021, a major COVID-19 outbreak at an Olymel factory in Alberta had left several workers dead.

On 30 March, the collective bargaining agreement between the workers and Olymel expired. On 19 April, the union presented an agreement offer to the company, however, received no response. On 28 April, workers began walking off the job. The strike had begun.

On 24 May, around 250 workers held a demonstration in downtown Vallée-Jonction. On 7 July, around 250 striking workers held a demonstration in front the Ministry of Labour in Québec City, calling for the company to return to negotiations. The next week, around 100 workers held a demonstration in Princeville, Quebec.

In mid-July, negotiations between the company and the workers resumed. In late July, the union accused the company of backtracking after the two sides had reached an agreement on certain points. On 30 July, the union announced that it would temporarily pause negotiations to consult with the workers on the next steps to take.

Early August saw a number of halts and restarts in negotiations between the union and the company, centered around the company's demand to introduce 10-hour afternoon shifts without overtime pay. On 2 August, Minister of Labour Jean Boulet stated in an Ici RDI interview that "this needs to end. A labour dispute of this nature cannot be tolerated in Québec."

On 14 August, the union announced a tentative deal had been reached with the company. However, when the deal was sent to a vote for ratification, workers voted to reject the deal by 57%.

On 18 August, the Ministry of Labour appointed Jean Poirier to act as a special mediator in the strike. Poirier had previously served as a mediator during the 2006–07 strike. Boulet also stated that he would be unwilling to introduce a law in the National Assembly to impose a deal and forcibly end the strike.

As the strike continued, pork producers and veterinarians in the province raised concerns about the future of the pigs in farms that were awaiting slaughter, with farmers stating that their farms were approaching conditions of overcrowding and high mortality rates due to the summer heat. Pork producers stated that if the strike continued, they might proceed with mass euthanisation of around 150 000 pigs. The strike also saw some American meatpacking factories increase production to try and increase sales in Canada.

In mid-August, Costco Japan ended its deal with Olymel, that had seen Olymel serve as an exclusive supplier, stating that Olymel was failing to provide goods and was unable to tell Costco when they would be able to resume shipments. By that point, around 40 workers at the factory had already handed in their resignations.

On 24 August, the company issued an ultimatum, demanding that the union ratify a new agreement by the end of the month, or else the company would fire all the night shift employees, around 500 in total. Local politicians and small businesses reacted negatively to Olymel's ultimatum, fearing the impact the cuts would have on the town's economy.

On 29 August, the union announced that a tentative deal had been reached with Olymel, including an increase in pay of 26,4% across the next six years, the introduction of a new pension plan, and more flexibility for workers seeking to book summer vacations. On 31 August, 78% of workers voted in favour of accepting the deal, ending the strike. After carrying out maintenance tasks to prepare for a return to work, the factory resumed operations a few days later, on 3 September.

== See also ==
- Impact of the COVID-19 pandemic on the meat industry in Canada
