= BMR Group =

Canadian chain of hardware stores

BMR
- Company type: Subsidiary
- Industry: Retail
- Founded: 1967 (under Union-Six)
- Headquarters: Boucherville, Quebec
- Products: Home improvement
- Number of employees: approx. 4,500 (2010)
- Parent: Sollio Cooperative Group
- Website: bmr.ca

BMR is a hardware store with chains located in the Canadian provinces of Quebec, Ontario, New Brunswick, Nova Scotia, and Prince Edward Island, as well as in Saint Pierre and Miquelon, an overseas collectivity of France located on islands near Canada. BMR specializes in the distribution and sale of renovation products and household hardware.

== Description ==
The company distributes and sells renovation products and household hardware to homeowners and home builders. Their success is often attributed to the fact that their stores are warehouse styled for large and small market areas. Their major competitors comprise Home Hardware, Castle Building Centres, Home Depot and Rona/Réno-Dépôt.

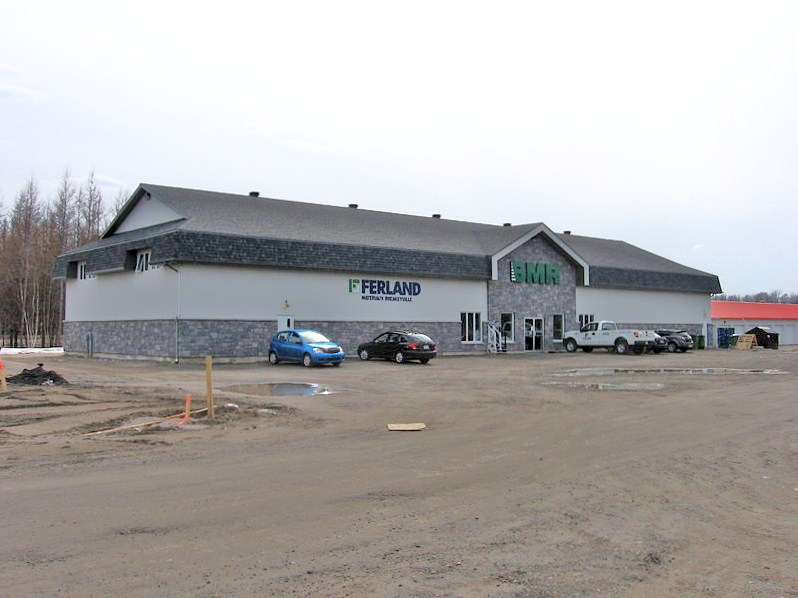
BMR in Breakeyville, Québec

Providing service throughout Quebec, Ontario, and the Maritimes, the company has more than 200 hardware stores which employ 4,500 persons. BMR is headquartered in Boucherville, Quebec.
