= 2021 Norwegian cultural workers strike =

Labour strike

The 2021 Norwegian cultural workers strike was a seven-week labour strike by workers in the cultural sector in Norway in the autumn of 2021 over pension plans.

== Background ==
In 2016, cultural workers in Norway, representing by the LO Stat trade union, accepted a temporary pension agreement with Arbeidsgiverforeningen Spekter. However, further negotiations for a more permanent pension structure reached an impasse, with the employers demanding a pension plan where men and women receive different payments and with the workers wanting a lifelong, gender-neutral plan.

== Strike ==
On 4 September, after mediation talks between the workers and Spekter failed, around 220 cultural workers walked off the job, launching the strike. The strike included workers from Den Nationale Scene, the Norwegian National Opera and Ballet, Det Norske Teatret, the National Theatre, Rogaland Teater, and the Bergen Philharmonic Orchestra. In response, a number of performances were cancelled or postponed.

On the week of 20 September, an agreement yet to be reached, a further 121 cultural workers walked off the job, including workers from Hålogaland Teater, Oslo Nye Teater, and the Kristiansand Symphony Orchestra. On 24 September, LO Stat announced that the strike would expand again if an agreement had not been reached by the end of the month, with an additional 249 workers walking off the job to reach a total of over 800 workers on strike by the beginning of October. On the weekend of 23 October, the union announced that a further 209 employees would go on strike on Monday, bringing the total number of striking workers to over 1000.

On 25 October, an agreement was reached between the workers and Spekter, ending the strike. The agreement included lifelong, gender-neutral pension plans, beginning in April 2022.

== See also ==
- Pensions in Norway
- Culture of Norway
- 2021 San Antonio Symphony strike
