= 2021 Nigerian doctors' strike =

Labour strike involving doctors in the Nigerian Association of Resident Doctors

2021 Nigerian doctors strike
- NARD Strike
- Date: 2 August 2021 - ongoing
- Location: Nigeria
- Caused by: Non-payment of salary arrears; Non-payment of insurance benefits
- Methods: Strike action

Parties
Nigerian Association of Resident Doctors	Federal government of Nigeria; Federal Ministry of Health; Federal Ministry of Labour and Employment

The 2021 Nigerian Doctors’ Strike was a labour strike involving doctors organised under the Nigerian Association of Resident Doctors (NARD). The strike began on 2 August and was suspended by court order on 23 August. The strike, one of four to have involved NARD since the start of the COVID-19 pandemic, was caused by pay disputes between the union and the Federal government of Nigeria, with the union alleging that the government had reneged on an agreement that they had reached following the end of the last strike in April. Following this, the union (which represents approximately 40 percent of doctors in the country) went on strike. A hearing before the National Industrial Court of Nigeria is scheduled for 15 September.

== Background ==
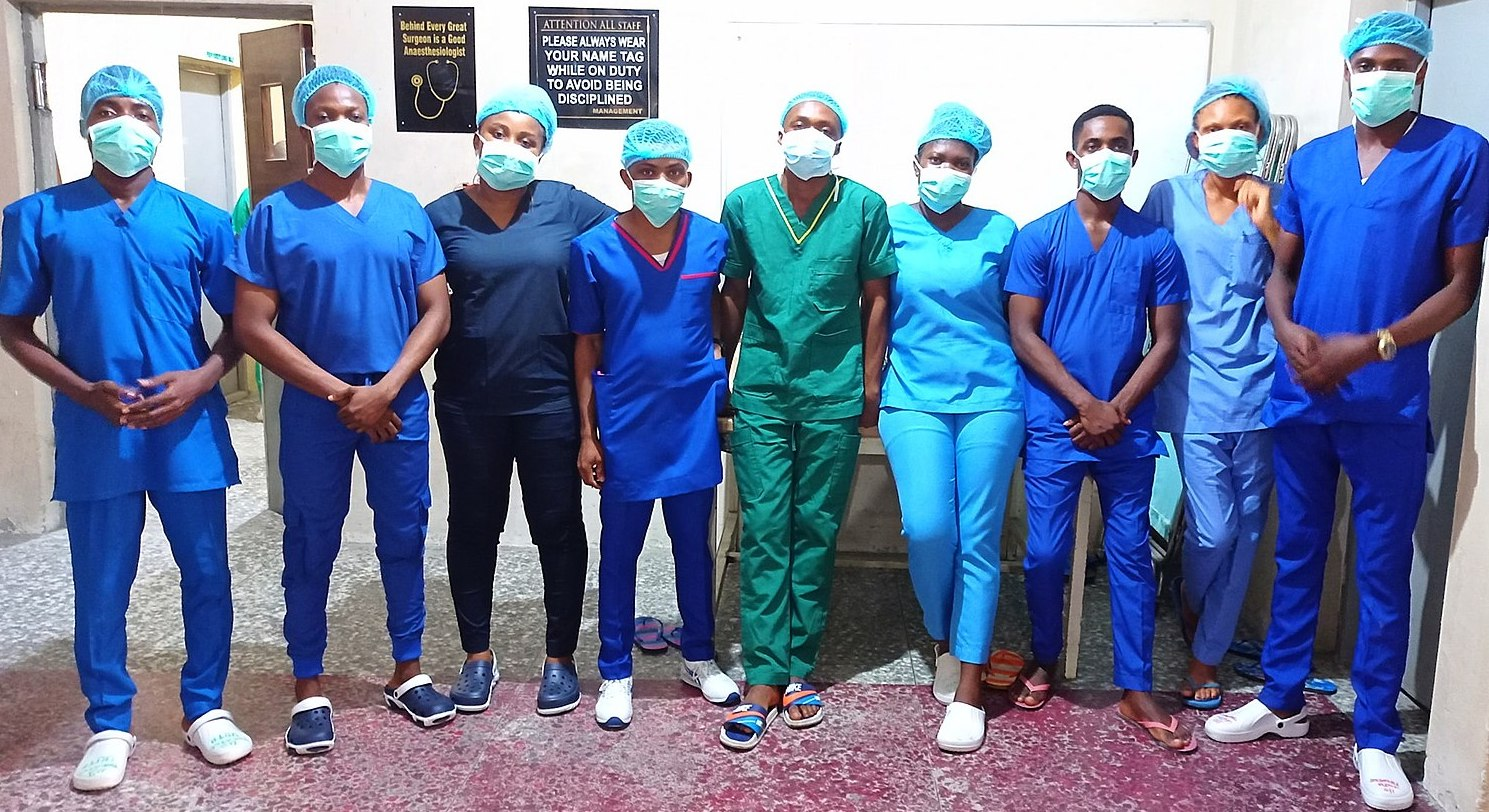
Health professionals in Nigeria during the COVID-19 pandemic, March 2021

During the COVID-19 pandemic in Nigeria, the Nigerian Association of Resident Doctors (NARD), a national medical association that represents approximately 40 percent of all doctors in the country (Note: Approximately 16,000 doctors total.) (including 90 percent of doctors in the country's teaching hospitals), experienced a strained relationship with the Nigerian government over pay disputes. In March 2020, NARD's Abuja chapter declared a strike after the government had failed to pay doctor's salaries for two months. In June, and later September, NARD launched two nationwide strikes over arrears from as far back as 2014, as well as for increased salaries, hazard pay and funding for residency. Yet another strike occurred in April 2021 over similar issues of payment stretching back several months. That strike lasted ten days before ending on 10 April. Prior to the strike, on 31 March, NARD and the Nigerian government had signed a memorandum of understanding (which was later amended on 9 April) that addressed some of the doctor's concerns. However, after several months, NARD claimed that the government had not implemented the terms of that memorandum. On 19 June, NARD threatened additional industrial action to protest the government's refusal to pay. As a result, on 31 July, the National Executive Council of NARD met and unanimously voted to go on strike starting on 2 August in order to protest the government's inaction. In addition, NARD was requesting the government to pay insurance benefits to the family of 19 of their members who had died of COVID-19 over the course of the pandemic.

== Course of the strike ==
The strike began at 8 a.m. on 2 August, a Monday. Speaking to Agence France-Presse, the president of NARD stated that the strike was set for an indefinite period of time, and no exemptions were made for doctors handling COVID-19 treatments. According to a state chairman of NARD, the strike would end when the government agreed to implement the policies of the memorandum. Speaking to The Guardian at the outbreak of the strike, the president of the Nigerian Medical Association (NMA) declined to comment on the strike action, but did criticize the government's failure to pay the doctors their wages. In that same article, it was stated that the Federal Ministry of Labour and Employment had not received a strike notice from NARD prior to the start of the strike, but that they were still prepared to initiate dialogues with the union as soon as possible. At the time of the strike's start, Nigerian President Muhammadu Buhari was out of the country on a medical visit to the United Kingdom. The strike commenced as Nigeria was experiencing its third wave of COVID-19 cases. The following day, on 3 August, Minister Adeleke Mamora of the Federal Ministry of Health spoke at an NMA conference where he urged the striking doctors to return to negotiations.

The strike occurred during the third wave of COVID-19 cases in the country.

On 5 August, Vanguard reported that NARD had sent a letter to the Medical and Dental Council of Nigeria (MDCN) that protested MDCN's action of barring house officers from going on strike with NARD, alleging that MDCN did not have the authority to enforce that prohibition. Around the same time, the National Assembly issued a statement asking NARD to "consider the situation" and call off the strike in light of the ongoing pandemic. However, over the following days, both sides took hardline stances, with Labour Minister Chris Ngige stating on 7 August that he was setting a 7 day ultimatum for the doctors to return to work before they faced possible termination. Also, he invoked a "no work, no pay" rule that would prohibit the doctors from getting paid for the duration of the strike. In addition, Ngige warned his children, who are doctors, not to join the strike, and also pointed out that the International Labour Organization supported his position. Additional responses to the strike came from the Director-General of the All Progressives Congress's Progressive Governors Forum, who chided NARD and urged them to return to work. However, the president of NARD stated that the strike would continue indefinitely until their demands were met. NARD also received support from the Centre for Labour Studies, who questioned the legality of Ngige's "no work, no pay" stance. In addition, supporters of the strike pointed to the disparity between the funding for government hospitals (such as the ones affected by the NARD strike) and the quality of health care available to the upper class of society, such as President Buhari. Around the same time, the Medical and Dental Consultants Association of Nigeria (MDCAN) was also threatening strike action over similar issues that NARD was facing. However, out of fear of a much larger strike involving both NARD and MDCAN, Ngige moved to address many of MDCAN's demands, and by 15 August it was reported by The Sun that the organization was no longer planning for strike action.

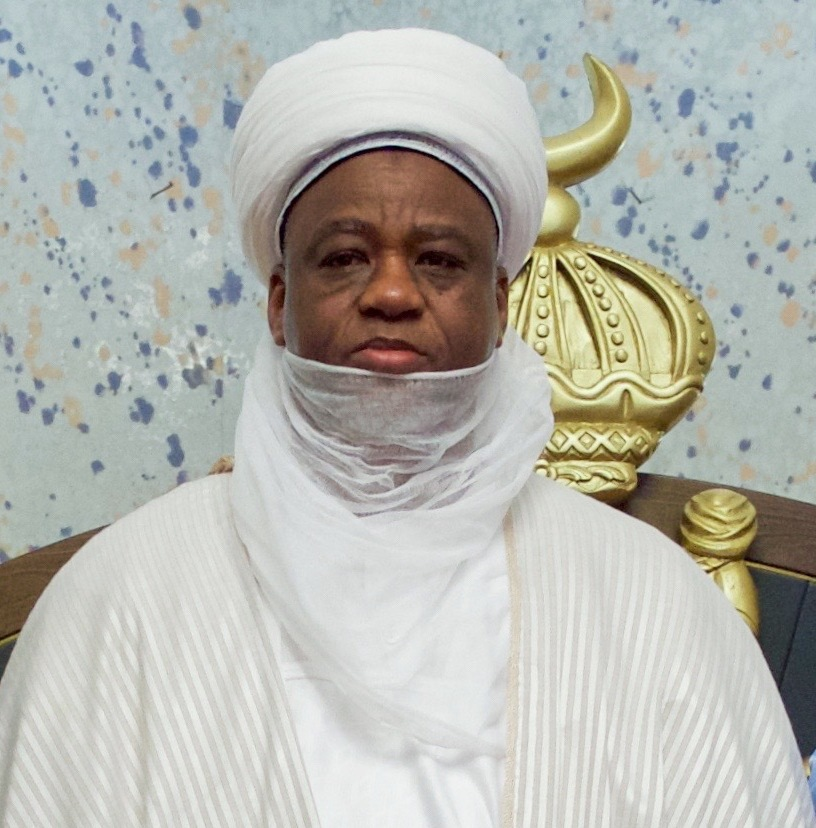
Sa'adu Abubakar, the Sultan of Sokoto, called for an end to the strike and for the Nigerian government to resume negotiations.

On 10 August, representatives for NARD met for negotiations with members of the House of Representatives for over six hours, though without a deal or agreement being made. Following this, on 12 August, Minister Ngige handed the dispute over to the National Industrial Court of Nigeria for adjudication. Around the same time, the NMA was threatening to join NARD in striking if payments the government had promised them were not made. Additionally, Vanguard reported shortly afterwards that the government was attempting to halt consultants from joining the strike. Criticizing NARD, Ngige alleged that the doctors were attempting to "play God" with the strike. The National Industrial Court later set a hearing date for the case for 15 September. On 13 August, following almost two weeks of striking, the Nigerian Supreme Council for Islamic Affairs issued a statement urging doctors to stop striking and return to negotiations with the government, stating, "Without prejudice to the legitimacy of the demands of the NARD, we urge the Association to, in the spirit of the Hippocratic Oath to which members subscribe and in consideration of the devastating effects of COVID-19 pandemic and the outbreak of cholera in some parts of the country, suspend the industrial action while negotiation with the government continues". The President-General of this group, Sultan of Sokoto Sa'adu Abubakar, also urged the Nigerian government to return to the bargaining table. Another religious leader in the country, Archbishop of Abuja Ignatius Ayau Kaigama, similarly called for an end to the strike. However, by 15 August, Vanguard was reporting that "there is no end in sight to the protracted strike." On August 19, the National Industrial Court rejected a request to order NARD to cease their striking that had been submitted to them by a nongovernmental organisation, with the judge saying he would not issue such an order without first hearing from the doctors.

On 21 August, it was reported that the Association of Hospital and Administrative Pharmacists of Nigeria (AHAPN) were considering industrial action in order to add further pressure the Nigerian government into honoring their agreements with NARD. That same day, Ngige stated that the Ministry of Labour had reached an agreement with the NMA that would see the terms of a memorandum between the two implemented by 23 August. This came after a round of negotiations that had started the previous day, 20 August, where the NMA had brought NARD to the bargaining table at the request of President Buhari. With the implementation, it was reported by numerous sources that NARD may end or suspend their strike. However, due to an undisclosed clause, NARD refused to sign the memorandum and instead continued the strike. However, on 23 August, the National Industrial Court ordered that NARD suspend its strike effective immediately. However, the presiding judge rejected a request from the Nigerian government to fully end the strike, instead calling on the parties "to suspend all forms of hostilities and maintain status quo".

On 29 August, it was reported that the Forum of Chairmen of Health Institutions in Nigeria (FCHIN) had charged the government and union to reach an agreement to end the strike. Shortly thereafter, the NMA announced their intent to strike within 21 days if the federal government did not resolve the issues that had been addressed in agreements with various groups associated with the NMA. This came around the same time that a spokesperson for NARD stated that the federal government had not paid their employees for August.

On 4 October 2021, the doctors in Nigeria's government hospitals called off it’s two-month old strike. The president of the Nigerian Association of Resident Doctors, Dr. Dare Ishaya, stated that the resident doctors said they will resume work after they “achieved some positive results” in talks with the government.

== See also ==
- Healthcare in Nigeria
- Impact of the COVID-19 pandemic on healthcare workers
- Impact of the COVID-19 pandemic on hospitals
- List of health and medical strikes
- Strikes during the COVID-19 pandemic
- Brain Drain in Nigeria
