= 2021 South Korean delivery workers strikes =

Series of labour strikes in South Korea

The 2021 South Korean delivery workers strikes were a series of labour strikes by delivery workers in South Korea in 2021.

== Background ==
The delivery industry experienced a significant surge during the COVID-19 pandemic in South Korea, with a 21% increase in the number of parcels delivered in 2020 compared to 2019. However, the 40,000 people who work as deliver couriers in South Korea face significant issues, including low pay, poor working conditions, and extremely long working hours. Many delivery workers are forced to work up to 14 hours a day. In 2020, at least 19 delivery workers were documented to have died due to overwork. In August of that year, the South Korean Ministry of Labour issued a statement calling for logistics companies to ensure couriers got enough rest.

== Strikes ==
On 15 January, the Parcel Delivery Workers' Solidarity Union announced that it would hold a vote on a strike, saying that "even after logistics firms announced measures to prevent deaths from overwork (in October), one worker died and four others fainted due to overwork." On 20 January, 91% of the workers voted in favour of striking, on a 97% turnout. The strike would be of indefinite length and was predicted to cause significant disruptions to deliveries around Lunar New Year.

On 21 January, the union and logistic companies announced that a deal had been reached, under meditation from the Ministry of Land, Infrastructure and Transport. The agreement would limit working hours to a maximum of 60 hours a week and 12 hours a day, along with limiting deliveries after 21h in the evening. The agreement would also see logistic companies create systems for sorting parcels instead of relying on delivery workers to both sort and deliver parcels.

However, immediately following the agreement, doubts were raised about the implementation of the deal, with delivery workers at several locations through the country reporting that the companies were not implementing it. In response, the union announced that it would be re-launching the strike. On 29 January, the strike was called off after the companies agreed to sign a legally binding deal, including government inspections teams to ensure that the companies followed the terms.

On 4 February, further controversy over the implementation of the deal was sparked after the Association of Delivery Contractors issued a complaint saying that they had not been included in the negotiations and had not received any details concerning companies' plans to address the sorting issue.

In April, a conflict occurred between delivery workers and a residential complex in Gangdong District, eastern Seoul, after the complex banned workers from parking inside the complex but residents still demanded that workers make deliveries direct to their doors. On 2 May, a delivery workers union representing 5500 workers affiliated with the KCTU announced that it would be holding a vote on whether to strike in protest against gapjil, an arrogant and authoritarian attitude or actions of people who have positions of power over others. On 7 May, 77% of the workers voted in favour of striking, with strike action due to begin on 11 May.

In June, delivery workers affiliated with the Parcel Delivery Workers’ Solidarity Union walked off the job at several companies, including CJ Logistics, Lotte Global Logistics, Hanjin Transportation, and Logen. The union accused logistic companies of failing to implement the January agreement on working conditions, with an internal survey showing that 85% of delivery workers still had to both sort parcels without compensation before delivering them. At companies where workers did not have the right to strike, the workers chose to begin work two hours late in protest. The strike involved around 10% of delivery workers in the country. A rally held by the workers in Seoul was dispersed by police. On 17 June, a new agreement was reached, where the companies once again agreed to limit working hours to 60 hours a week and pledged to hire workers to sort parcels by September.

On 20 October, a number of delivery workers took part in the general strike called by the KCTU.

== See also ==
- Economic inequality in South Korea
- 2021 Gorillas strikes
