= Lafleur (brand) =

Canadian brand of cooked meats

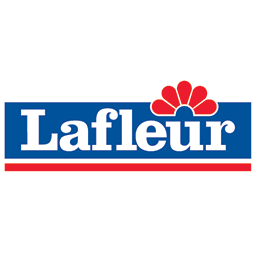
Logo of the Lafleur Brand.

Lafleur is a trademark of Olymel (l.p.), owned by La Coop fédérée. The cooked meats brand, specializing in the processing of pork products, was founded in 1912 by Alphonse Lafleur (1882-1934). Lafleur products are sold only in Quebec.

== Description ==
Lafleur is a specialized brand in the Quebec meat processing industry. Over seventy products are sold under this trademark, including smoked sausages. Their products are divided into 8 categories: fresh bacon, fully cooked bacon, smoked sausages, fresh sausages, ham, deli, sliced deli and spreads, like cretons or head cheese.

Since 2005, Lafleur has been owned by Olymel, l.p., headquartered in Saint-Hyacinthe, Quebec. They employ nearly 10,000 people in Canada.

Lafleur produces 15 million kilograms of products each year. Most of their products are made in the Québec region.

== History ==
Alphonse Lafleur started a deli meat shop bearing his name in the St. Roch in Limoilou, Quebec, in 1912. The business was known for sausages and deli prepared with a careful selection and blending of spices.

In 1913, Lafleur began acquiring the lots adjacent to his shop. He purchased more lots in 1920, enabling him to increase the size of the business. In 1934, at the age of 52, the founder Alphonse Lafleur died and his wife Oliva became the president of the company. Oliva and her four sons (Jean-Marie, Gérard, Raymond et Georges-Henri) inherited the business. The commerce was transformed into a corporation and the company's capital stock was established at 20,000 dollars, or 200 shares at 100 dollars each.

The company focused on pork products until 1942. That year, the family decided to diversify and began slaughtering cattle. Oliva Lafleur was president of the company until 1943. She then passed the business on to her children, along with the company shares. Her son Raymond became the new president and Gérard, the Treasurer. Between 1943 and 1945, the company acquired new lots and buildings and went through a major transformation of the brand and the modernization of their equipment. By 1955, Lafleur employed over 80 people. They began offering their products wholesale and used a fleet of modern trucks for delivery.

In 1956, the firm's capital stock was increased from 20,000 to 120,000 dollars. Using major daily papers in Quebec such as Le Soleil, they advertised Lafleur products including blood sausage, cracklings, head cheese, ham, etc. The brand's products were sold through grocery stores and butcher shops in the region.

As Lafleur prepared to celebrate its 50th anniversary in 1961, the company president, Raymond Lafleur, died. His brother Gérard took over the leadership of the family business.

In 1962, Lafleur was classified as a factory and had an order preparation centre, deli, salting and cooking departments as well as smokehouses and sections for packaging.

The death of Gerard Lafleur, in 1967 led to a reorganization of the senior management. In 1969 important decisions for the future were taken, including a withdrawal from retail trade in order to focus on wholesale meat products and meat processing, and the cessation of calf and cattle slaughtering.

The company signed its first collective agreement in November 1970.

In February 1972, Alphonse Lafleur Limited accepted a purchase offer from J.N. Brochu Inc., a family owned agrifood company from Lévis, Quebec.

Lafleur operations were consolidated with Salaisons Brochu, a division of Groupe Brochu, in the late 1970s. An additional 150 people were hired in 1978, and the plant began operating at full capacity producing emulsions, hams, bacon and smoked sausage.

The facility in Saint-Henri-de-Lévis was expanded many times and was producing 100 million pounds of pork each year. The company was the first Québec slaughterhouse to export its products to Japan.

The Brochu family began to take over the Montreal market in the early 1980s. They helped expand the Lafleur brand. In 1985, a centre was built in Laval to handle product distribution.

In 1991, the company hired hockey player Guy Lafleur to become the advertising spokesman for "La Bonne Fourchette," a sausage brand in the Lafleur product line. Revenues from the Lafleur division were then estimated at $88 million.

Lafleur was the first in Canada to produce pre-cooked bacon in 1997. The Brochu family innovated with products, such as pre-packaged sliced meats, marinated pork, honey and maple flavoured shaved Black Forest ham. They also introduced bold initiatives on product traceability.

In 1998, the Joliette slaughterhouse was the first company to be certified compliant with the Food Safety Enhancement Program (FSEP) and the Hazard Analysis Critical Control Points (HACCP) standards. In subsequent years, all their plants received this certification, long before the program became mandatory in November 2005.

In 2005, Supraliment, the meat division of Groupe Brochu, merged with Olymel l.p., a fiduciary of La Coop fédérée. This cooperative movement is accountable for more than 90,000 farmer members. The company employs nearly 10,000 people in Canada, including over 7,500 in Quebec. Its sales are in excess of 2.5 billion dollars annually, and it exports nearly 50% of its products.

Lafleur became one of Olymel's leading brands, along with Olymel and Flamingo. The company is represented in two major sectors in their industry: pork and poultry. Olymel has been developing the Lafleur brand since 2005.

In 2009, Lafleur launched a new brand of products under the name of "Authentique." Traditional recipes, using simple and authentic ingredients, adapted to 21st century consumers, inspired this sub-brand.

Lafleur celebrated their 100th Anniversary in 2012. It was then inducted into the corporate 'Hall of Fame' by the Quebec Food Retailers Association (A.D.A.), section member/provider (SMF). The brand was inducted for being in business for 100 years. This is a rare occurrence for a brand in Quebec history.

== Visual Branding (logo) ==
Throughout the 50s, the Lafleur logo was bearing the words "A. Lafleur Ltée."

In 1978, the logo displayed a flower inside the corner of the letter "L".

The company decided to rejuvenate the logo that adorned the brand's products in 1984. The new signature, with the "u" in Lafleur surmounted by five red petals, was inspired by the words of Alphonse, the founder, who always said he was making "the flower of sausages".

The company used a modified version of their logo to promote the centennial of the brand in 2012. It had the same appearance as the official logo, replacing the word "Lafleur" with "100 years", or "100 ans" in French.

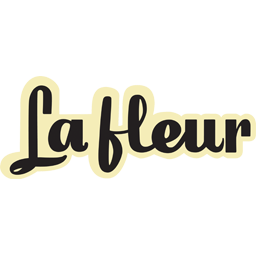
1972

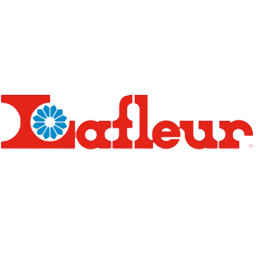
1978

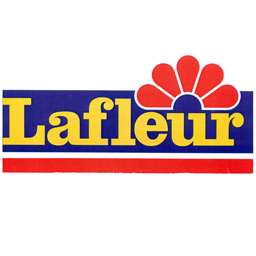
1984

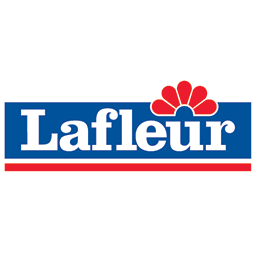
1985

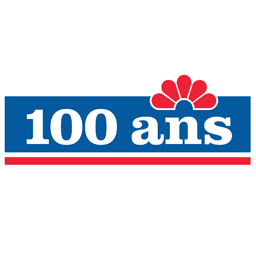
Modified version for the centennial of the brand in 2012.

== Products ==
More than seventy Lafleur products are offered, under 8 categories:

Bacon

- Fully cooked bacon
- Fresh bacon

Deli products

- Full-serve deli counter
- Self-serve deli counter

Sliced deli products

- Shaved meats
- Sliced cold cuts

Smoked sausages

- Smoked sausages
- Cocktail wieners

Breakfast sausages

- Fresh sausages
- Frozen sausages

Ham

- Full-serve deli counter
- Self-serve deli counter

Spreads

- Cretons
- Others

== Certifications ==
Lafleur products are prepared under the supervision of the Canadian Food Inspection Agency (CFIA).

The facilities are compliant with the Food Safety Enhancement Program (FSEP) and the Hazard Analysis Critical Control Point (HACCP) standards. This systematic and preventive guideline to enhance food safety is recommended by the Codex Alimentarius Commission, the United Nations international standards organization for food safety.

In August 2010, the company embarked on a process to bring all its facilities up to Safe Quality Foods (SQF) Code standards, a certification recognized internationally by the Global Food Safety Initiative (GFSI).

The Lafleur products all bear the label "Aliments du Québec" or "Aliments préparés au Québec."

== Plants ==
The Lafleur products are prepared in facilities in Saint-Henri-de-Lévis, Drummondville, Trois-Rivières, Cornwall and Anjou (slicing). Over 1780 employees work in these plants.

== Publication ==
In honour of their 100th anniversary in 2012, the Lafleur brand was featured in a recipe book called "De Lafleur à votre table." The company's corporate chef, Marc Laroche, contributed all the recipes in the book, highlighting their products along with some popular, local products like cheese and maple syrup.

== Advertising ==
In the early 1990s, celebrity hockey player Guy Lafleur became the advertising spokesman for "La Bonne Fourchette" sausages, a Lafleur product line. "The Flower," as hockey fans knew him, pushed the brand recognition even higher.

In 2009, Lafleur launched a major publicity campaign. The brand replaced the name of products with their logo.

Lafleur began the celebration of their centennial with the launch of a TV commercial, "Au cœur de vos moments partagés," aired for the first time on the popular year-end show Bye Bye, in 2011.

Throughout 2012, the company celebrated their 100 years in business with various in-stores and TV promotions. A Facebook page was also launched to engage a discussion with consumers.

In 2014, Lafleur launched two advertising campaign. The first one, in French, featured Bob Le Chef with the tag line "On se dit les Vraies Affaires." The second one presented important events under the theme "Chez nous c’est Lafleur."
