= Benedict Bakwaph Kanyip =

President of the National Industrial Court of Nigeria

- Bakwaph

NICN

Personal details
- Born: Benedict; 29 September 1963 (age 62) Anturung-Attakar
- Spouse: Hon. Justice Rosemary I. Kanyip
- Children: Benedict Zitung, and Benny.
- Education: • Ahmadu Bello University, Zaria • Nigerian Law School •
- Occupation: Jurist; legal scholar; and author
- Awards: OFR (2022) FNIALS (2018); Bar Presidential Award (2024) Appointments: President, NICN (2019–present) Previous positions: Associate Research Professor, NIALS (1995–2000)

Hon. Benedict Bakwaph Kanyip, ^{OFR}, ^{FNIALS} (born 29 September 1963) is a Nigeria jurist and legal scholar who has served as the president of the National Industrial Court of Nigeria since December 13, 2019.

== Early life and education ==
Kanyip was born on September 29, 1963, in Anturung-Atakar, in the Zangon Kataf Local Government Area in Kaduna State, Nigeria. Kanyip attended St. Peter Clavar's School and St. John Vianney's Minor Seminary. He studied at Katsina College of Advanced Studies and Ahmadu Bello University, Zaria, earning his LL.B. (1985), LL.M. (1991), and PhD in law (1998). He was called to the Nigerian Bar in 1986.

== Career ==
=== Academic and legal background ===
Kanyip lectured at Ahmadu Bello University from 1987 to 1992, then worked as Legal Adviser for the National Commission for Colleges of Education from 1992 to 1995. He became a senior Research fellow in 1995 at Nigerian Institute of Advanced Legal Studies. He later became Associate Research Professor at the same institution in 2000.

=== Judicial career ===
Kanyip became a judge of the court in 2000, receiving a tenured appointment in 2004. He was appointed Acting President in October 2019 and became the substantive President in December 2019.

== Publication ==
His Notable works include National Industrial Court Jurisdiction: "How Narrow is Narrow"? (2021) and Elements of Commercial Law (1994). His work Consumer Protection in Nigeria: Law, Theory and Policy (2005) is based on his doctoral thesis.

== Personal life ==
Hon. Justice Kanyip is married to Hon. Justice Rosemary I. Kanyip, and they have two children.

== Also see ==
- National Industrial Court of Nigeria
