= Getir =

Turkish on-demand food and grocery delivery start-up

- Type: Private
- Founded: 2015; 11 years ago
- Founder: Nazım Salur
- Headquarters: Istanbul, Turkey
- Area served: Turkey
- Revenue: 300 Turkish lira (2018)
- Owner: Mubadala Investment Company
- Number of employees: 32,000+
- Website: getir.com

Getir (Turkish pronunciation: [ɟeˈtiɾ]; "bring" in Turkish) is a Turkish company that offers rapid on-demand delivery services for grocery items and a courier service for restaurant food deliveries, accessed via a mobile app. Until 2024, it was active in multiple countries.

Originally founded in 2015, by early 2022, Getir announced that it had raised US$768 million in its Series E, valuing the company at nearly $12 billion, but a further funding round in mid-2023 valued the company at a quarter of that figure.

From 2023, Getir began to withdraw from some of its foreign markets, and in April 2024, the company announced it was leaving all countries except Turkey. All foreign operations ended in May 2024.

== History ==
The company was founded in 2015 by a team including Nazım Salur, who also founded the Turkish ride-hailing app BiTaksi. Getir expanded rapidly since then, having doubled its orders in the second half of 2019 to reach almost 1.5 million in December of that year. It generated $120 million from sales in 2019.

In July 2021, Getir bought Spanish online grocery startup BLOK, adding several major cities in Southern Europe to its delivery spots. On 23 November 2021, Getir bought UK-based hyper fast grocery delivery startup Weezy.

In March 2022, the company closed a Series E funding round, raising $768 million, with Mubadala Investment Company leading the round, making Getir's valuation $12 billion.

Getir acquired rival firm Gorillas in December 2022 for $1.25 billion.

Getir does not publicize its revenues or profit, although leaks suggest it made $1 billion revenue in 2021. A May 2023 report quotes Getir's CEO Nazim Salur as saying that the company was profitable in some markets in Turkey, but the business as a whole was and would continue not to be profitable as it expanded.

From 2023, Getir started to withdraw from countries other than its home, Turkey.

In September 2023, the company was seeking $500 million in an equity funding round that would value the company at $2.5 billion, a quarter of the March 2022 value. Many other grocery delivery companies had flourished during the COVID-19 pandemic, but closed down when demand later plummeted.

In November 2023, Getir acquired FreshDirect, a competing online grocery company operating in the US.

In September 2024, Getir in its entirety was bought out by Mubadala Investment Company. In June 2026, Uber received regulatory approval to acquire Getir's food, grocery, marketplace, and water delivery businesses in Turkey, while committing to invest $500 million in the country.

== Operations ==
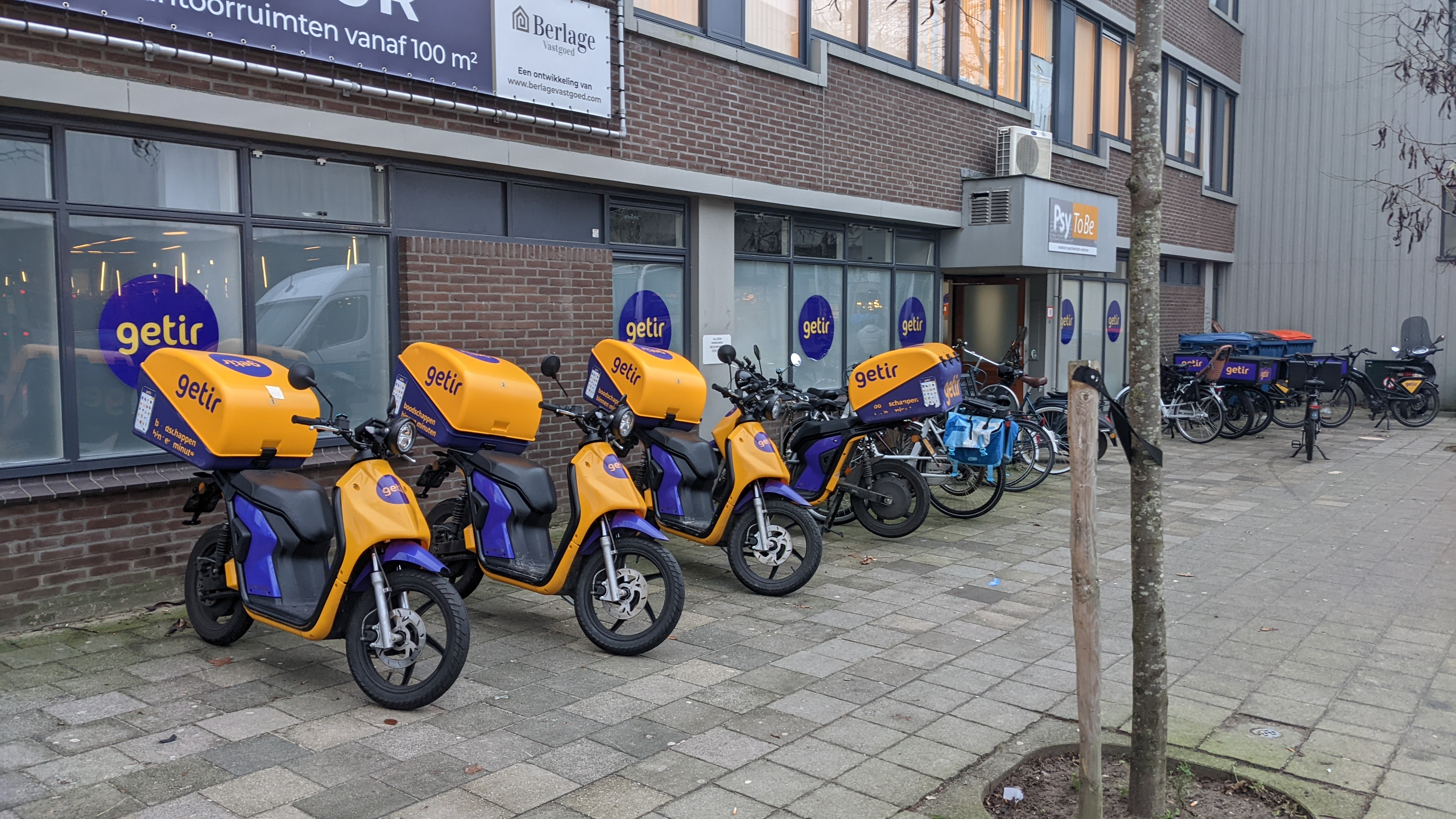
Getir's electric vehicles in Rotterdam

All five of the company's services ("ultrafast" delivery, takeaway food delivery, online grocery shopping, online water ordering, ordering from local businesses, ordering a taxi (via BiTaksi), and finding local employment) are offered through a single Getir app.

== Locations ==
In November 2021, Getir services were offered in all 81 Turkish provincial capital cities, 15 UK cities, 15 Dutch cities, 7 German cities, and 3 US cities. In mid-2023, it withdrew from France, Italy, Spain, and Portugal, following a drastic reduction in sales after the boom during the COVID-19 pandemic.

Locations as of May 2024
Country	Cities
Turkey	Adana, Adıyaman, Afyonkarahisar, Aksaray, Amasya, Ankara, Antalya, Ardahan, Artvin, Aydın, Ağrı, Balıkesir, Bartın, Batman, Bayburt, Bilecik, Bingöl, Bitlis, Bolu, Burdur, Bursa, Çanakkale, Çankırı, Çorum, Denizli, Diyarbakır, Düzce, Edirne, Elazığ, Erzincan, Erzurum, Eskişehir, Gaziantep, Giresun, Gümüşhane, Hakkari, Hatay, Isparta, Istanbul, Iğdır, İzmir, Kahramanmaraş, Karabük, Karaman, Kars, Kastamonu, Kayseri, Kilis, Kocaeli, Konya, Kütahya, Kırklareli, Kırıkkale, Kırşehir, Malatya, Manisa, Mardin, Mersin, Muğla, Muş, Nevşehir, Niğde, Ordu, Osmaniye, Rize, Sakarya, Samsun, Şanlıurfa, Siirt, Sinop, Şırnak, Sivas, Tekirdağ, Tokat, Trabzon, Tunceli, Uşak, Van, Yalova, Yozgat, Zonguldak

In June 2023, Getir withdrew from Spain and Portugal, and halted operations in France. Getir was reported to be selling UK assets and closing warehouses, and considering the closure of its UK business.

In April 2024, Getir announced that it was to focus on Turkey, and withdrew from other countries, following increasing competition, and decreasing sales affecting rapid-delivery companies following the end of the COVID-19 pandemic. Within a few days of the announcement, UK franchises were selling Getir- and Gorillas-branded freezers, mopeds, and other equipment, faced with losing half their investment.

== Competitors ==
While many fast delivery companies flourished during the COVID-19 pandemic years of 2020–2022, demand later decreased greatly and many companies closed. By September 2023, Getir's principal global competitors were Zapp in London and Gopuff in the US and UK. Other large delivery companies which had been delivering meals were branching out into Getir's market of grocery deliveries, including Uber Eats, Just Eat and Deliveroo. In the UK, supermarkets were offering rapid delivery services: Tesco's Whoosh, Sainsbury's Chop Chop and Ocado's Zoom.
