= 1984 West Germany metalworkers' strike =

1984 strike in West Germany

- Date: 14 May 1984 – 1 July 1984
- Location: West Germany
- Methods: Strike action

Parties
IG Metall	German automobile corporations

Number
367,000	

The 1984 West Germany metalworkers' strike was a strike by metalworkers in West Germany from 14 May to 1 July 1984. The metalworkers and their union IG Metall sought introduction of a 35-hour work week. Lasting seven weeks, one of the largest and longest strikes in West German history, the strike cost the German automobile industry over three billion dollars.

== History ==
=== Prelude ===
As collective bargaining negotiations began, IG Metall argued that introduction of a 35-hour work week would also help reduce unemployment, potentially creating space for hundreds of thousands of new jobs. Auto corporations, on the other hand, argued that the 35-hour work week would lead to a significant increase in the cost of labour, and would see jobs lost to factories overseas where labour was cheaper.

On 5 May 1984, 80.05% of IG Metall members voted in favour of taking strike action for the 35-hour work week.

=== Strike ===
In the early hours of 14 May, metalworkers across West Germany began walking off the job, launching the strike.

On 7 June, IG Metall proposed a compromise deal in which the work week would be reduced to 37 hours by 1986. The deal was rejected by the auto corporations.

On 20 June, over 12 000 members of the Printing and Paper Union walked off the job in support of the metalworkers' strike, causing cancellation of several morning papers' issues. The strike also saw walkouts by members of the Trade, Banking and Insurance Union.

=== Resolution ===
On 28 June, negotiators for the two sides and arbitrator Georg Leber announced that a preliminary agreement had been reached. The agreement included a reduction in working hours to 38,5 per week, as well as a 3,3% pay increase in 1984 and a 2% pay increase in 1985. In exchange, unions would lose certain powers over work schedules.

On 2 July, work resumed at Volkswagen factories across West Germany.

== Reactions ==
West German Chancellor Helmut Kohl described the demand for a 35-hour work week as "absurd and dumb." Minister of Labour Norbert Blüm stated that the strike risked "catastrophic damage" to the West German economy. Dieter Kirchner, director of the employers' association Wirtschaftsvereinigung Stahl, stated that the German auto industry had "never yet experienced such a brutal and cynically calculated strike."

IG Metall negotiator Ernst Eisenmann accused the auto corporations of "using every means to stay on a confrontation course" during the strike instead of negotiating in good faith.

Federal Minister of Economics Martin Bangemann estimated that the strike caused a 1% decrease in the West German GDP during the second quarter of the fiscal year. The German Institute for Economic Research estimated the decrease at 2%. IG Metall's strike fund decreased by two hundred million dollars as a result of the strike.

== Aftermath ==
The next nationwide metalworkers' strike in Germany was taken place 11 years later: the 1995 German metalworkers' strike.
