= 2021 New Zealand nurses strike =

Labour dispute in New Zealand

Striking nurses marching in Lambton Quay, Wellington

The 2021 New Zealand nurses strike was a labour strike by nurses in New Zealand in June of 2021.

== Background ==
The New Zealand Nurses Organisation (NZNO) is New Zealand's largest trade union and professional organisation that represents the nursing profession, midwives and caregivers. It is one of the oldest organisations of this type in the world, tracing its lineage back to the Wellington Private Nurses Association formed in 1905.

== Strike ==
After the collective bargaining agreement between the NZNO and the district health boards expired, nurses raised a number of concerns to be addressed in negotiations. Among the concerns were low pay, an ongoing pay equity claim, and the chronic shortage of nursing staff. Nurses reported that many nursing students left to Australia after graduation instead of staying in New Zealand, attracted by the better working conditions and better pay.

On 1 April, the district health boards presented the first formal agreement proposal to the NZNO. The deal was rejected by NZNO members. David Wait, a lead NZNO advocate, stated that the proposal contained "less than a tenth of what nurses have asked for" and that it would "entrench highly pressurised working conditions fuelled by unsafe workloads and under-staffing. It will leave nurses struggling financially and it will have an impact on future health challenges, such as a significant Covid outbreak." As the negotiations continued and a deal could not be reached, the prospect of strike action increased.

On 7 June, NZNO members rejected a new deal that included only a 1.4% pay raise (below the 17% requested by the union) and a one-time lump sum of $4000 in owed back pay. On 9 June, the strike went ahead, with around 30,000 nurses walking off the job. The initial strike lasted from 11 am to 7 pm, and saw the cancellation of non-urgent surgeries and outpatient clinics.

In late July, negotiations once again broke down, and NZNO members voted to take further strike action, beginning on 29 July. However, before the strike, the government offered a revised agreement, and the union agreed to temporarily suspend the strike. The government did not disclose the percentage of the pay raise, but stated that the deal would cost $408m and last 27 months, as well as including commitments to settle the pay equity claim, a ministerial review of the Safer Staffing Accord, and the launch of a recruitment campaign to fill around 1500 nursing vacancies in the country. On 29 July, however, NZNO members voted to reject the offer, setting strike action for 19 August and 9 September.

On 2 August, the NZNO formally issued a notice for another strike on 19 August from 11 am to 7 pm, with life-preserving roles exempt. In mid-August, however, before the strike action could take place, New Zealand entered a nationwide lockdown due to a case of community transmission in Auckland of the Delta variant, with subsequent community cases in Auckland and Wellington. In response to the lockdown, the NZNO called off the strike action, stating that "it would not be safe or responsible for us to continue with a strike if the country is under lockdown."

On 15 October, the NZNO announced that 83% of members had voted to accept a new collective bargaining agreement which would last until 31 October 2022.

== See also ==
- Nursing in New Zealand
- COVID-19 pandemic in New Zealand
- 2021 Danish nurses strike
