= 2021 Hunts Point Produce Market strike =

Labor strike in New York City

- Date: January 17–23, 2021
- Location: Hunts Point, The Bronx, New York City, New York, United States
- Caused by: Breakdown in contract negotiations
- Goals: $1 hourly wage increase; Increased healthcare protections
- Methods: Strike action; Picketing
- Result: Hourly wage increase of $1.85 over three years, including a $0.70 hourly increase in the first year; Additional $0.40 per hour contribution to employee health care

Parties
Teamsters Local 202	Hunts Point Produce Market; New York City Police Department

The 2021 Hunts Point Produce Market strike was a labor strike involving workers for Hunts Point Produce Market in the Hunts Point neighborhood of the Bronx, New York City. The strike was carried out by about 1,400 members of Teamsters Local 202, all "produce handlers and delivery drivers" according to The Wall Street Journal. An agreement to end the strike was reached on January 23, 2021.

== Background ==
The Hunts Point Produce Market is a large market in the Bronx. According to New York City Mayor Bill de Blasio, the market provides approximately a quarter of all of New York City's fresh produce, while a 2021 article from WPIX claims that the market supplies over 60% of New York City's produce. At the time of the strike, a majority of workers at the market had a base hourly salary of between $18 and $21, with some workers making as low as $15/hour. The events leading up to the strike began after contract negotiations between the market and Teamsters Local 202 (the local union representing about 1,400 workers at the market) broke down. The union was demanding a $1 hourly wage increase plus an additional $0.60 increase in health care benefits. The market countered the union's offer with a $0.32 hourly wage increase, which union representatives claimed was insufficient, citing additional risks workers had been facing during the COVID-19 pandemic. Over 200 union members had contracted COVID-19 with six members dying as a result. Over the weekend of January 16–17, 2021, the union held a vote in favor of strike action.

== Course of the strike ==
The strike commenced at 12:01 a.m. on January 17, 2021, the first strike action taken by market workers in 35 years. At the start of the strike, Bronx borough president Rubén Díaz Jr. expressed his disappointment that the union and market could not come to an agreement, but optimism that the dispute could be resolved quickly. However, he also warned that the strike could have a "ripple effect across the East Coast." On the afternoon of January 18, U.S. Representative Ritchie Torres and New York City mayoral candidate Andrew Yang joined the picket lines in support of the strikers, while the next morning, civil rights attorney and mayoral candidate Maya Wiley demonstrated with the strikers. Starting that same day, members of the New York City branch of the Democratic Socialists of America (DSA) began to organize support for the workers, which included joining the picket lines with the strikers. During the strike, the DSA would raise approximately $30,000 to help feed the strikers. The picketers were also joined by members of other unions, including Teamsters Local 107, the United Federation of Teachers, the New York State Nurses Association, and the United Auto Workers.

On the morning of January 19, 6 strikers were arrested by New York City Police Department officers while picketing on charges of obstructing traffic. Clips from the event showed several dozen officers in riot gear approach about two dozen strikers, with the strikers chanting "hands up, don't shoot". Union officials denounced the police action, with local union president Daniel Kane saying, "The fact that they were arrested on Martin Luther King Day reminds us what side of history we are on".

On January 20, several elected officials, including U.S. Representative Alexandria Ocasio-Cortez, attended a picket in support of the strikers. This occurred during the inauguration of Joe Biden, with many publications asserting that Ocasio-Cortez "skipped" the event in order to show solidarity with the strikers. Additional elected officials at the picket included New York State Assembly member Amanda Septimo and New York City Public Advocate Jumaane Williams. That same day, it was reported that a 21-car freight train carrying merchandise to the market turned around after the engineer (a fellow Teamster) talked with some of the strikers.

A settlement was reached on January 23, 2021, providing raises totaling $1.85/hour over three years, including an increase of 70 cents/hour in the first year. Stephen Katzman, co-president of the Hunts Point's cooperative board, stated the settlement will increase workers' wages and benefits over 10% during the course of their contract, with an average gain of 3.4% in each year of the agreement. Management will also make additional contributions of 40 cents/hour to healthcare benefits. About 97% of striking employees voted in favor of the deal, which raises the average base pay to $20.42/hour by the third year. WLNY-TV reported that it was the "largest pay raise in decades" for the market workers, with The New York Times corroborating that it was the largest raise in over 30 years. The settlement was largely viewed as a victory for the union.

== Aftermath ==
In a February 23 article on GrubStreet.com, it was reported that 26 employees at the produce market had been fired since the end of the strike, with the publication arguing that the firings may be retaliatory terminations.

== See also ==
- COVID-19 pandemic in New York City
- Strikes during the COVID-19 pandemic
