= Hunts Point Cooperative Market =

Large food market in the Bronx, New York City

Coordinates: 40.813°N 73.878°W

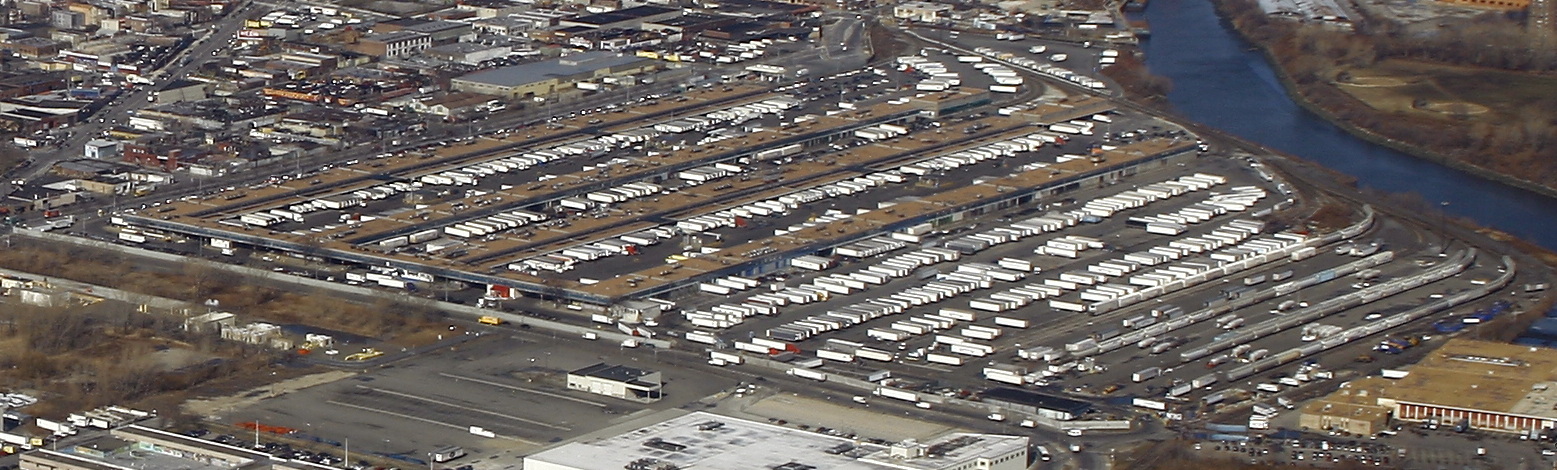
Hunts Point Cooperative Market in 2008

The Hunts Point Cooperative Market is a 24/7 wholesale food market located on 60 acres (24 ha) in the Hunts Point neighborhood of the Bronx, New York City. The largest food distribution center of its kind in the world, it earns annual revenues of over $2 billion.

Located at the Hunts Point Food Distribution Center, which houses the Fulton Fish Market and a produce market, the Hunts Point Cooperative Market is the source for approximately 50 percent of the New York region's meat. More than 50 independent wholesale food businesses located at the Market supply food to over 22 million people in the New York metropolitan area.

== Public Safety ==
The Hunts Point Department of Public Safety is a privately owned and operated safety & security force that was formed in 1985, whose mission is to protect the employees, visitors and property of Hunts Point Market. Hunts Point Department of Public Safety currently employs about 45 NYC special patrolmen (peace officers). The exercise of this authority is limited to the employee's geographical area of employment and only while such employee is working as defined in Chapter 13 subsection (C). All Special patrolmen are required to comply with the New York City Police Department's rules and requirements to receive special patrolman status. Hunts Point special patrolmen are issued a pistol license by the New York City Police Department and carry a firearm while performing their special assignment only.

The Hunts Point Market is patrolled by the 41st Precinct of the NYPD, which is located at 1035 Longwood Avenue.

The New York City Police Department is the primary policing and investigation agency within New York City as per the NYC Charter, which includes Hunts Point Market.

== History ==
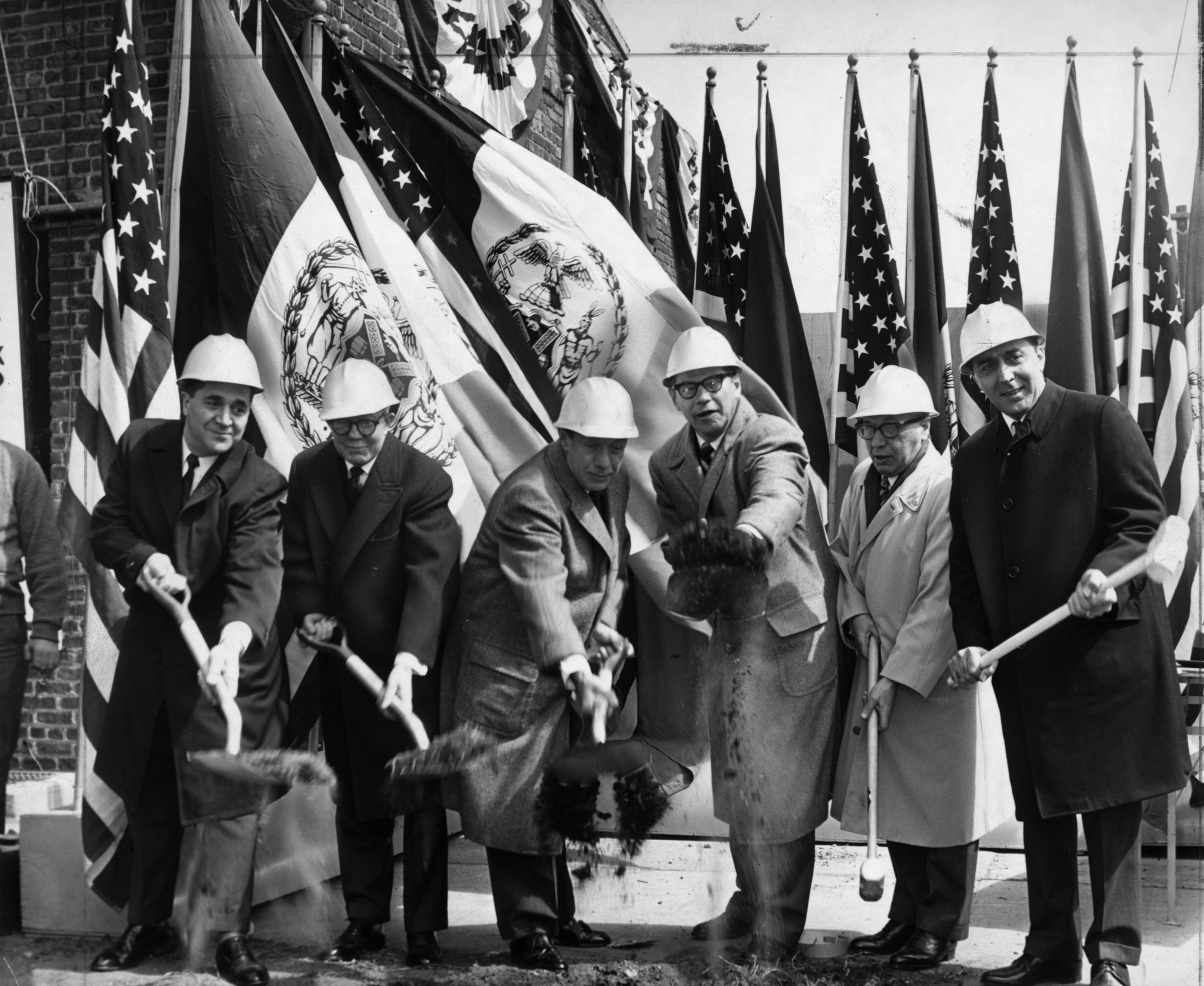
Groundbreaking ceremony, 1962

Built in 1962 as a 40-acre facility with six buildings, the Market consists of seven large refrigerated/freezer buildings on 60 acres, with a total refrigerated space of approximately 700,000 square feet (65,000 m^{2}). It is governed by the United States Department of Agriculture (USDA). The produce market alone is spread across 1,600 refrigerated diesel-powered trailers running 24/7, although the New York City Department of Transportation has implemented pilot programs and announced long-term plans to replace these units with electric or hybrid options.

In 2011, the City of New York and the New York City Economic Development Corporation (NYCEDC) made significant headway in their ongoing efforts to support the Hunts Point Market in the South Bronx. In June, they reached an agreement with the Hunts Point Terminal Produce Cooperative to extend its lease for another three years, while the Cooperative and NYCEDC work together to develop a long-term plan for a larger, modernized facility in the Bronx. To this end, the City and State have each agreed to contribute capital resources and to work with the Cooperative to secure additional third-party sources of funding.

In January 2021, over 1400 workers at the market arranged a strike in support of a $1-per-hour wage increase and a $0.60 hourly increase for healthcare benefits. This strike was the first to occur at the market since 1986, though in 2012 opposing a 14 cent hourly increase and in 2015 opposing a $25-per-week raise, Local 202 threatened strikes in support of higher wage increases. This strike was the first major work stoppage of the year (a stoppage involving over 1000 workers).

In the 2020s, a renovation of Hunts Point Market was proposed, with an estimated cost of over $600 million. The state government approved $130 million for the project in 2023, followed by $130 million from the city government and $145 million from federal grants. Subsequently, Mayor Eric Adams announced in December 2025 that the Hunts Point Market would be rebuilt as an energy-efficient facility. Under the administration of his successor Zohran Mamdani, the proposal to rebuild the market stalled before ultimately being canceled in late 2026.

== Transportation ==
The market can be accessed from other boroughs via the Bruckner Expressway (Interstate 278) and Sheridan Boulevard (New York State Route 895). It is serviced by rail via CSX Transportation's Oak Point Yard and gets around 2700 cars per year. In 2012 the market received a $10 million federal grant to improve rail operations. Currently, rail cars and trucks share unloading docks, causing conflicts. The rail improvements are part of a $332.5 million major renovation to the market that is under negotiation. In 2015, Mayor Bill de Blasio announced that New York would spend $150 million over 12 years to modernize the market. At that time, the market had 115 private wholesalers at the bazaar employing around 8,000 people.

It is also the eastern terminus of the MTA's Bx6, Bx6-SBS and Bx46 routes.
