= Castle Building Centres Group =

Canadian lumber retailer

Castle Building Centres Group Ltd.
- Type: Cooperative
- Founded: Newmarket, Ontario, 1963
- Headquarters: Mississauga, Ontario
- Key people: Ken Jenkins, President
- Website: www.castle.ca

Castle Building Centres Group Limited (Castle) is the oldest Canadian-based, cooperatively-owned buying group of lumber and building materials. Castle members do not necessarily fly a 'Castle' branded banner, as the store owners are independent and can choose to fly any non-competitive banner. Many stores do not even have a brand associated directly with the name of their store, opting for something more familiar in their market.

Castle also produces Contractor Advantage, a magazine published bi-monthly and distributed nationally. Articles in the magazine are specifically geared toward products, trends and the business side of contracting.

== History ==
The company began in 1963 when a group of dealers in Ontario formed BOLD Lumber (Buying Organization of Lumber Dealers). BOLD's ambition was to negotiate its pricing with suppliers based on their collective volume. After their first year, they grew from 6 to 20 dealers. By 1969, the business charter was adjusted to expand beyond 50 dealers. Membership grew from across the country, giving BOLD a national presence.

In 1969, the Board of Directors rejected the notion of a public share offering and franchising concepts in favour of encouraging independent control by its members.

In 1982, the company name was changed to Castle Building Centres Group Limited. The company at this time had grown to 157. The first Castle logo appeared in brown, white and gold. Castle was among the first to introduce the concept of the drive-thru lumberyard concept.

As "big box stores" emerged in Canada, Castle's members continued their growth and remained competitive. The focus on lumber and building materials set the typical Castle store apart. The buying group also assists stores with optional supplemental programs such as local flyers, television spots, health & safety tools, web site services and insurance. The brand logo was also updated to blue, yellow and white.

In 2007, Castle's President and industry notable Provan Wylie retired. Replacing him was Ken Jenkins, formerly of gypsum manufacturer CGC Inc. As a cooperative, the buying group is entirely owned by the member stores. Governance is provided by a Board of Directors composed exclusively of member stores with representation constitutionally mandated from four regions of Canada.
