= 2021 German national rail strike =

German labour strike in mid-to-late 2021

The 2021 German national rail strike was a labour strike by Deutsche Bahn workers in Germany that lasted from August to September 2021.

== Background ==
Deutsche Bahn is a German railway company. Headquartered in the Bahntower in Berlin, it is a private joint-stock company (AG), with the Federal Republic of Germany being its single shareholder. The company describes itself as the second-largest transport company in the world, after the German postal and logistics company Deutsche Post / DHL, and is the largest railway operator and infrastructure owner in Europe. Deutsche Bahn was the largest railway company in the world by revenue in 2015.

The Gewerkschaft Deutscher Lokomotivführer (GDL) is a German trade union that represents workers in train companies. It has a membership of 34 000.

== Strike ==
In collective bargaining negotiations, the GDL asked for 3,2% pay raise over 28 months, as well as a COVID-19 bonus of €600 in 2021. Deutsche Bahn, on the other, demanded that the total pay raise of 3,2% be stretched over 40 months, as well as coming without any COVID-19 bonuses.

After the workers voted 95% in favour on a turnout of 70%, the GDL announced that it would begin strike action on the evening of 10 August, the first rail strike in Germany since 2018 and the first major rail strike since 2015.

On 23 August, the GDL launched a second round of strikes. In response, Deutsche Bahn accused the union of "striking to gain more membership and influence." The strike caused the cancellation of around 70% of long-distance trains that week.

On 30 August, the GDL launched a third round of strikes, due to last until 7 September. After the third round of strikes concluded, the GDL announced that it would launch a fourth round of strikes if no agreement could be reached before 13 September.

In early September, Deutsche Bahn announced that it would suing the GDL, in an attempt to forcibly end the strike. On 2 September, the labour court in Frankfurt rejected Deutsche Bahn's demand for an injunction. Deutsche Bahn then appealed the ruling, and was denied again on appeal.

On 4 September, the chair of the German Trade Union Confederation, who the GDL was not affiliated with, accused the GDL of dividing workers, stating that "in this case one group of staff, like the train drivers, is pushing through its particular interests at the cost of the collective interests of all other Bahn employees." That same day, Deutsche Presse-Agentur reported that a group within the Christian Democratic Union of Germany was planning to introduce laws that would increase restrictions on transport trade unions' ability to call strikes.

On 16 September, the GDL and Deutsche Bahn announced that they had reached a deal including a pay raise of 3.3% over 32 months, two one-time bonuses during the months, as well as assurances concerning pensions.
