= National Industrial Court of Nigeria =

- NICN
- Established: 1976 (under Trade Disputes Decree No. 7 of 1976); elevated to superior court status in 2010 (Constitution (Third Alteration) Act, 2010)
- Jurisdiction: Nigeria
- Location: Old Federal Secretariat, Phase II, Shehu Shagari Way, Abuja (current seat); Tafawa Balewa Square, Lagos (historical)
- Authorised by: Constitution of Nigeria; National Industrial Court Act, 2006
- Website: nicn.gov.ng

President
- Currently: Hon. Justice Benedict Ogona Kanyip

The National Industrial Court of Nigeria also known as NICN is a court empowered to adjudicate trade disputes, labour practices, matters related to the Factories Act, Trade Disputes Act, Trade Unions Act, Workmen’s Compensations Act and appeals from the Industrial Arbitration Panel and all other employment matters in Nigeria. As a specialized Labor Court, all matters adjudicated by it are exclusive to the court and its decisions were hitherto, subject only to appeal when certain conditions were met. Currently, appeals can be made to the Court of Appeal by leave.

The Trade Dispute Decree No.7 of 1976 set up the National Industrial Court; initially consisting of a president and four other members and a quorum of the president and two members. The initial jurisdiction of the court set forth in the Decree No.7 was dealing with trade union disputes and interpretation of collective bargaining agreements. From 1976 until 2006, the operations of the court was limited and its judgement barely respected. It operated on matters that emerged from arbitration or conciliatory labor disputes while it shared jurisdiction on most matters with the State and Federal High Court. The first president was Paul Atilade. Currently, Hon. Justice Benedict Kanyip is the President of the NICN. There is a total of 33 judges currently in the various divisions of the court.

In 2006, the legislature passed the National Industrial Court Act, 2006 (NICA), strengthening the rules of the court and its ability to enforce judgement. The Act also repealed parts of Decree No.7 and reduced some of the jurisdiction of the High Courts that was shared with NIC. The 1999 Constitution (Third Alteration) Amendment Act 2010 further enhanced the jurisdiction of the court and established it as a superior court of record. The procedures, jurisdiction, practice and power of the courts were properly defined by the 2010 act.

In 2017, the court made new rules which it now uses procedurally.

== Alternate Dispute Resolution ==
The 2006 Act encouraged arbitration of labour matters and in 2015, the court established the Alternate Dispute Resolution center. The centre's mandate include reduction in cost and delays in judicial delivery through efficient, fast and equitable settlement of disputes.

== Divisions ==
- Abuja
- Ado Ekiti
- Akure
- Awka
- Asaba
- Bauchi
- Calabar
- Enugu
- Gombe
- Ibadan
- Jos
- Kaduna
- Kano
- Lagos
- Lokoja
- Maiduguri
- Makurdi
- Minna
- Owerri
- Oyo
- Port Harcourt
- Sokoto
- Uyo
- Yenagoa
- Yola
