= Sollio Cooperative Group =

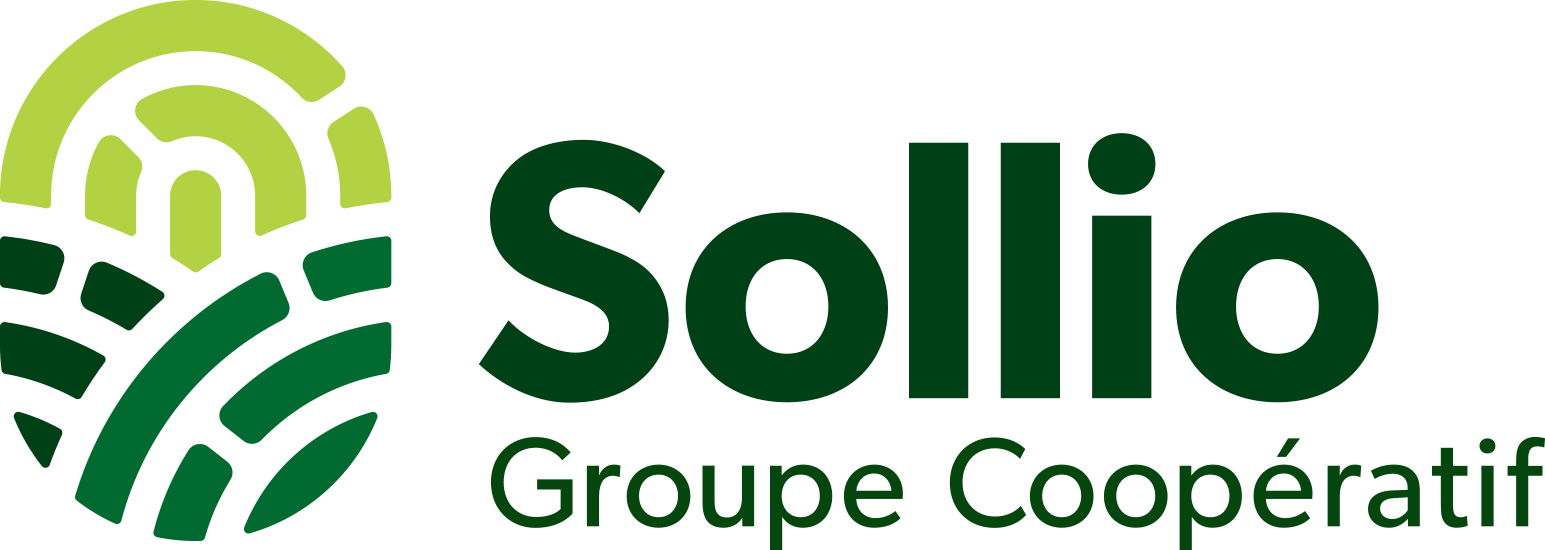

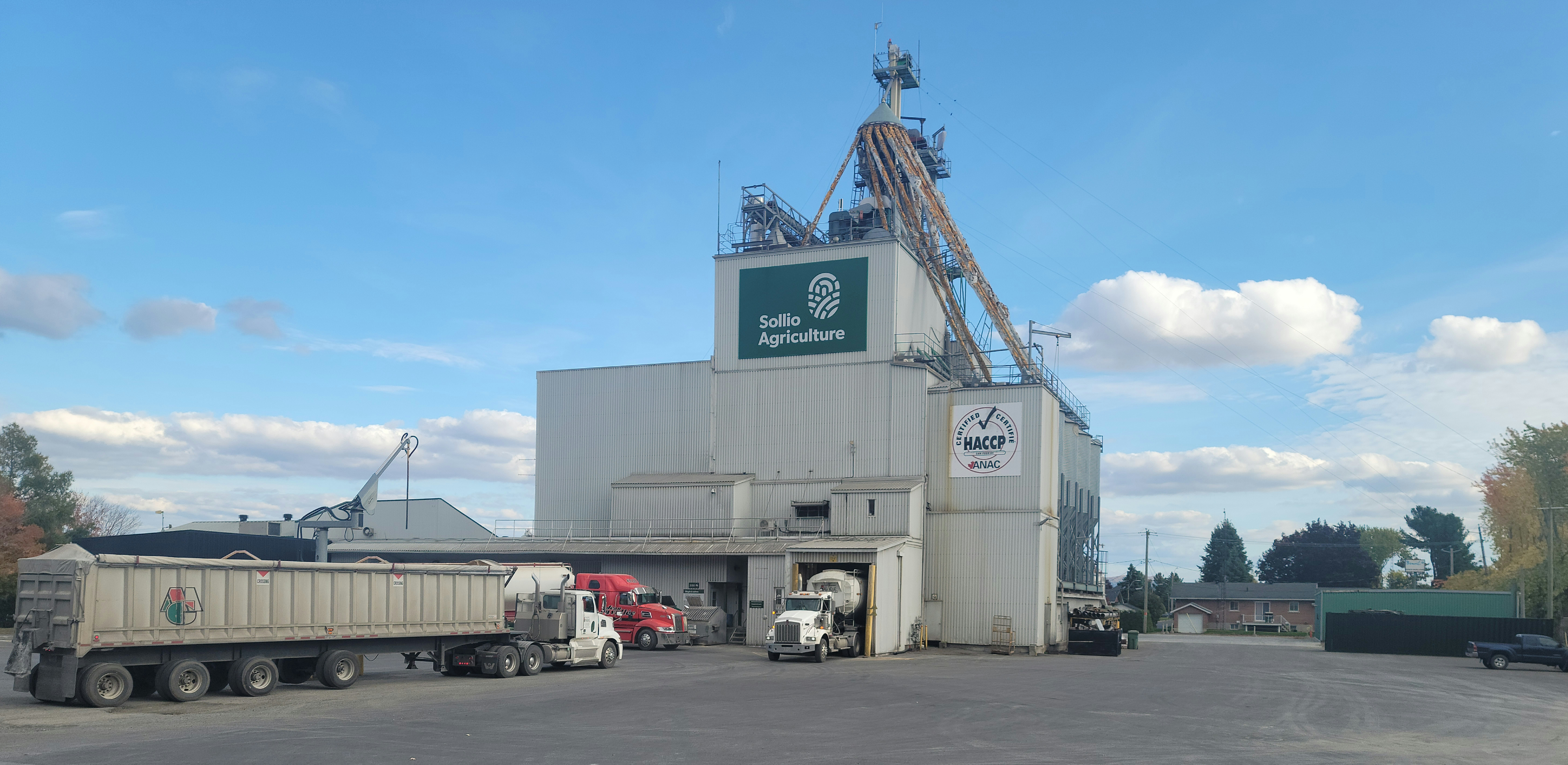
- Facility at Saint-Damase, Québec
- Formerly: La Coop fédérée, Coopérative fédérée de Québec
- Type: Cooperative
- Industry: Agriculture
- Founded: 1922; 104 years ago
- Headquarters: Quebec, Canada
- Brands: Olymel, Lactel (sold in 2000), Sonic, Unimat, BMR
- Revenue: CA$9.1 billion (2014)
- Members: 108,000
- Number of employees: 16,000

Sollio Cooperative Group (French: Sollio Groupe Coopératif) is a Canadian cooperative of agricultural producers in Quebec. It was previously known as the La Coop fédérée and Coopérative fédérée de Québec, which was founded in 1922.

== Structure ==
Sollio is composed of a hundred affiliated cooperatives, owned by 108,000 members. The Sollio network employs nearly 16,000 people and had a turnover of 9.1 billion Canadian dollars in 2014. Some brands or companies that it has owned or still owns are:

- Olymel is Canada's largest exporter of pork and poultry products.
- The "Lactel Group" was the largest private exporter of dairy products in Canada and was sold to "Agropur" in 2000. In 1992, Lactel was involved in a dispute between the Canadian and American governments over the Canada–United States Free Trade Agreement of 1989 and the Puerto Rican Health and Safety standard. After several years of dispute, Lactel was finally permitted to export to Puerto Rico, but as of 1999, held a very small share in the milk market.
- Sonic is the first Quebec distributor to offer a gasoline fuel supplemented with ethanol.
- Unimat and BMR, two Quebec firms in the hardware industry.

== Links ==
Site of Sollio Cooperative Group
