= 2007 German national rail strike =

Labor dispute in Germany

The German national rail strike of 2007 was a strike in Germany by the locomotive engineers union, Gewerkschaft Deutscher Lokomotivführer (GDL, or German Train Drivers' Union), which began on November 14, 2007 and ended on November 17, 2007. The union struck Deutsche Bahn, the state-owned company which operates the German rail system. It was the largest strike in history (as of 2007) against Deutsche Bahn.

== Origins of the strike ==
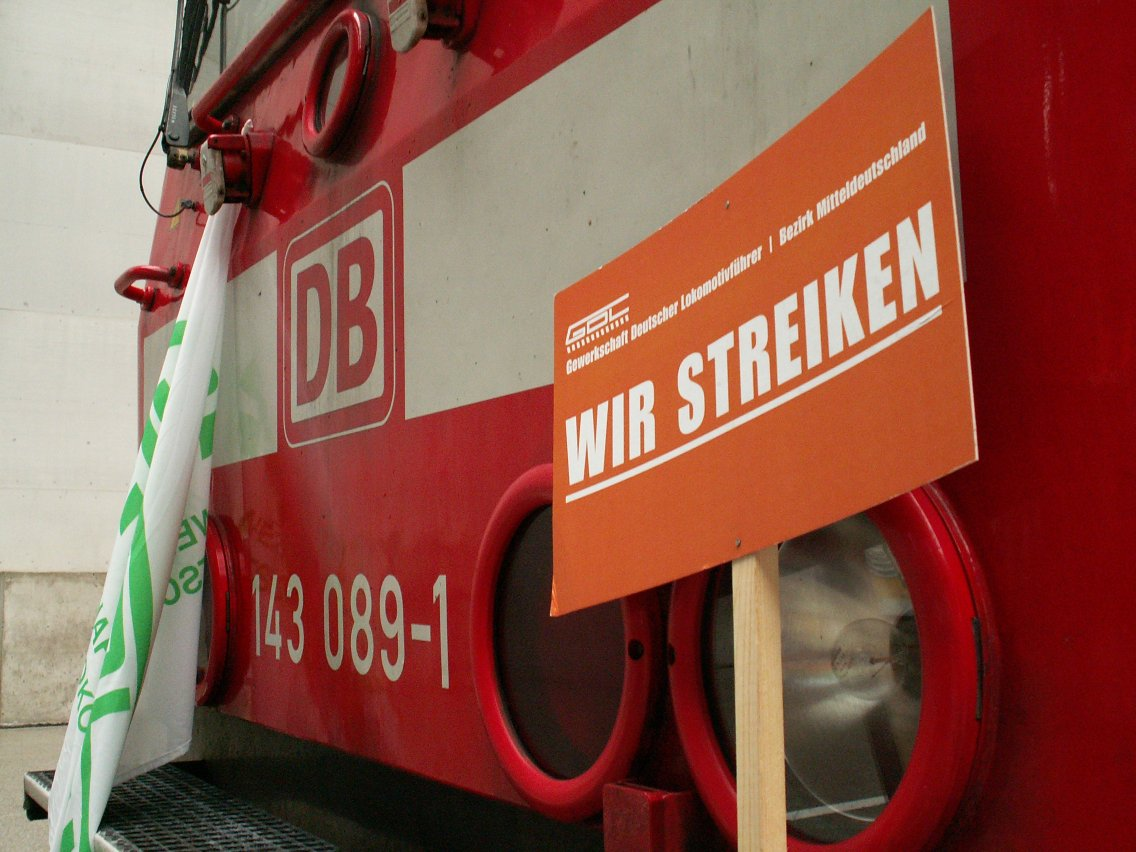
Strike sign used by the German Train Drivers' Union in the 2007 national rail strike.

German Train Drivers' Union/Gewerkschaft Deutscher Lokomotivführer (known by its German initials, GDL) is a relatively small union which represents about 34,000 train drivers in Germany.

In the fall of 2007, the union demanded a 31 percent wage increase from Deutsche Bahn, the state-owned company which operates the German rail system. The wage demand was far higher than the 4.5 percent wage increase won in July by Transnet Gewerkschaft (Transnet) and Verkehrsgewerkschaft GDBA (GDBA), the railway's two other large unions which together represent about 195,000 workers.

But GDL argued that German locomotive engineers are paid less than their counterparts in other European countries.

Deutsche Bahn rejected the wage demand. The company said that it was committed to the long-standing German trade union practice of bargaining a coordinated contract with all its unions at once to create uniform wage standards. Deutsche Bahn argued that meeting GDL's wage demands would break this pattern and lead to wage demands from other unions.

Deutsche Bahn countered by offering a one-time payment of €2,000 (about $2,934) and a 10 percent wage increase, with a two-hour extension of the work week. But GDL chairman Manfred Schell said the Deutsche Bahn offer was not acceptable as a basis for reopening talks. Deutsche Bahn refused to make another wage offer, and the company's 20-member supervisory board announced that it supported management's decision.

Both sides also engaged in a vitriolic war of words which held out little chance of avoiding a strike. Schell accused Deutsche Bahn of "raping" the country and the union, and declared DB had "provoked" the strike. Deutsche Bahn, in turn, accused GDL of "blackmail" and "madness" and said any strike would be "destructive" and an "economic disaster." Schell denounced the company, declaring, "This is all a theatrical performance by the railway."

Any strike was considered "...a bold gamble by an isolated union." GDL represented a mere 3 percent of Deutsche Bahn's workforce. No other Deutsche Bahn union supported the engineers' strike, nor did the German federation of trade unions, Deutscher Gewerkschaftsbund (DGB). But GDL had a tradition of breaking with other unions in wage negotiations. GDL also believed the time was ripe for a nationwide strike. Chancellor Angela Merkel's government had planned to sell a 49 percent stake in Deutsche Bahn to the public. The union believed it had to seek its wage demands now before the privatization effort began.

GDL engaged in a series of strikes throughout the summer and fall designed to increase pressure on the railway prior to engaging in a nationwide walkout. A short strike occurred in July 2007, and Deutsche Bahn sued the union for €5 million ($7.3 million) in damages. In October and early November 2007, GDL held several short strikes against local commuter lines, stopping work for a total of 65 hours. On November 10, 2007, the union held a 42-hour strike which stopped about 90 percent of all freight trains in the country. Deutsche Bahn estimated the November 10 freight strike cost €50 million ($73 million) each day.

Public sector workers in Germany have a severely restricted right to strike. Deutsche Bahn had previously won a court ruling limiting any strike to local service. But in early November 2007, the GDL union won the right to strike freight and long-distance trains as well.

== The strike ==
GDL announced that the strike against freight service would begin at noon Central European Time (CET) on November 14, while the strike against local and long-distance passenger trains would start at 2:00 a.m. CET on November 15. The union said the walkout would end at 2:00 a.m. CET on November 17, 2007.

Both strikes began on schedule.

Chancellor Merkel, adhering to the federal government's tradition of not intervening in labor disputes, declined to intervene. But other federal government officials pleaded for the resumption of negotiations. Transport Minister Wolfgang Tiefensee said ministry officials were working behind the scenes to mediate the dispute.

As anticipated, the strike affected train service nationwide. However, the company brought in 1,000 managers and other employees to keep trains running. Still, more than 40 percent of all freight trains were halted. While 50 percent of regional passenger trains in western Germany were running, only one in 10 regional passenger trains operated in eastern Germany. Disruptions in local service varied. In Berlin and Munich, commuter service was only minimally interrupted, but by the end of the day only a third of all trains had run. But in Hamburg, Frankfurt and Stuttgart, major cutbacks in train schedules occurred. In North Rhine-Westphalia, Germany's most populous state, trains ran every hour. Two-thirds of the country's high-speed InterCityExpress trains were running normally.

The economic impact of the strike appeared to be heavy. Deutsche Bahn said the strike cost it €50 million ($73 million) a day. Automobile manufacturers, which depended heavily on trains for moving vehicles, found inventories backing up immediately. Audi shuttered at least one plant in order prevent an additional backlog from occurring. Seaports, especially Hamburg, were clogged with containers. Germany's steel industry, which transports half its goods by rail, was also badly affected. Federal officials expressed public concern that the strike could affect the economy, which had slowed in recent months

Public support for the strike was relatively strong. Unscientific polls of commuters by newspapers and television stations showed support for the train drivers. A scientific poll conducted by Infratest Dimap for the public-service broadcaster ARD found that 61 percent of the people support the workers. Of 1,003 people surveyed, 47 percent said Deutsche Bahn was to blame for the strike, while only 25 percent fingered GDL. Nevertheless, the ARD poll found that public support for the union had slipped by five percentage points since mid-October. A second poll for the public opinion company Forsa for the newspaper Bild showed only 45 percent of the public supported GDL.

As the strike neared its conclusion, GDL Chairman Schell said he was open to a 31 percent pay increase without a separate collective bargaining agreement. Other union leaders suggested that the union might even accept a pay raise as low as 15 percent.

But Schell and other union officials reiterated their determination to win the labor dispute. Schell announced that the union might engage in a new, open-ended strike if no new offer was forthcoming from the employer. One report suggested that the union might extend its current strike through Christmas.

Deutsche Bahn did not take such threats lightly. It advertised throughout Europe for new train drivers. The company received 5,000 applications, and hired 1,000 new drivers. Deutsche Bahn said the newly hired locomotive engineers would be used to meet increases in demand, and not to help break any future strike.

== Conclusion and aftermath ==
The national rail strike ended as the union had planned, at 2:00 a.m. CET on the morning of Saturday, November 17, 2007.

GDL Chairman Schell declared that the union was "very happy" with the results of the national rail strike. However, Schell threatened another national rail strike if the union did not receive a new wage offer from Deutsche Bahn by November 19, 2007. Schell said the union would meet early on the week of November 19 to decide its next move.

Several news outlets subsequently reported that Deutsche Bahn planned to make a new wage proposal in order to avoid an indefinite strike. At least one newspaper said Deutsche Bahn planned to agree to the union's primary demand—a different contract from the one reached with the railway's two other labor unions last July.

GDL and DB finally concluded a separate agreement for 30,000 GDL members on 9 March 2008. This agreement was eventually approved by the bargaining association formed by Transnet and GDBA and was thus extended to the engine drivers in these two trade unions. The agreement took retroactive effect from 1 March 2008. Approximately 40,000 work days had been lost due to the strike in 2007

By contrast, in January 2009, DB was able to conclude an agreement that covered all 3 trade unions after only 2 weeks of negotiations.
