= 2021 San Antonio Symphony strike =

The 2021 San Antonio Symphony strike was a strike by the workers of the San Antonio Symphony in the United States. It marked the first strike by the Symphony workers since 1985. The strike ended with the bankruptcy of the symphony.

== Strike ==
During the 2019–2021 collective bargaining agreement, the workers of the Symphony had agreed to temporarily lower their pay by as much as 80% to help compensate for the impacts of the COVID-19 pandemic in the United States, under the expectation that they would return to their original pay levels for a new contract beginning in 2022. However, on 13 September 2021, the Symphony's management presented a final offer to the workers that would include cutting the number of full-time musicians by around 50% and would hire part-time musicians to fill the roles at 30% of the original salary and without benefits such as health insurance. On 16 September, the workers unanimously voted to reject the offer. Mary Ellen Goree, the chair of the Musicians of the San Antonio Symphony, stated that the management had "presented a proposal to the management of the board that contained cuts in our own pay, and we also proposed a joint management-musician fundraising initiative. They rejected that out of hand and presented us with their 'last, best, and final offer' without actually negotiating."

On 26 September, the Symphony management announced that it would be imposing its offer on the workers. In response, workers walked off the job the next day, beginning strike action. On 1 October, the Baltimore Symphony Musicians announced that it would be gifting $10 000 to the San Antonio musicians to show solidarity with the strike, responding to a call from the International Conference of Symphony and Opera Musicians. On 12 October, the musicians held a picket demonstration outside the Symphony offices. On 19 October, the Symphony announced the cancellation of its first two scheduled concerts of the season due to the strike.

== See also ==
- Striketober
- Strikes during the COVID-19 pandemic
