= Arbeidsgiverforeningen Spekter =

Employers' organisation in Norway

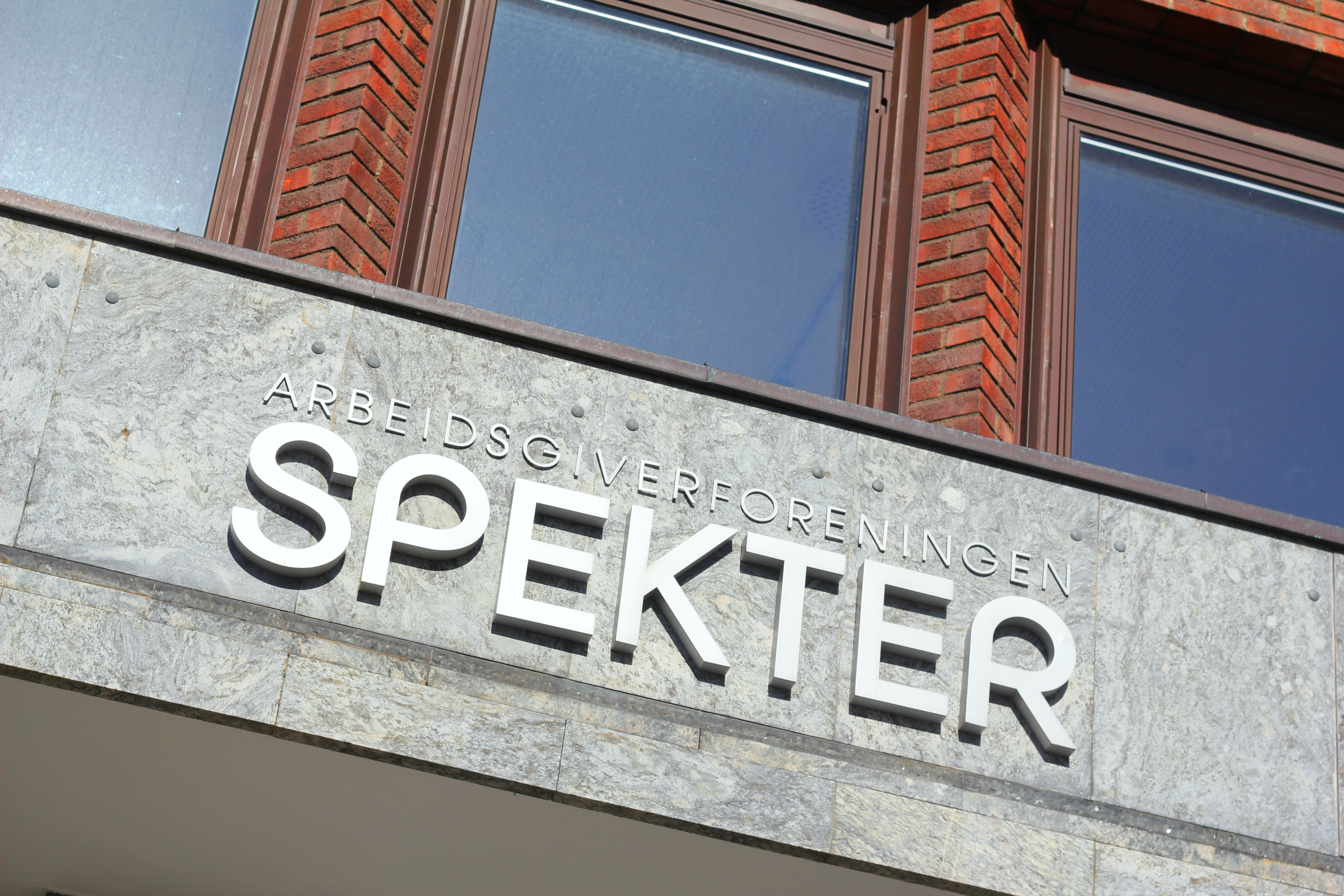

Arbeidsgiverforeningen Spekter is an employers' organisation in Norway.

It was established in 1993 as the Norwegian Association of Publicly Owned Companies (Norges arbeidsgiverforening for virksomheter med offentlig tilknytning). The name was shortened to Arbeidsgiverforeningen NAVO in 1999, and Arbeidsgiverforeningen Spekter in 2007. It organizes about 180 companies that are partially or formerly public-owned. Employees in these companies are generally organized within LO Stat. The CEO is Anne-Kari Bratten.
