= Nigerian Association of Resident Doctors =

- Abbreviation: NARD
- Formation: 1978
- President: Dr. Ogar Emmanuel Idoko
- Affiliations: Nigerian Medical Association
- Website: https://nardng.org
- Formerly called: National Association of Resident Doctors of Nigeria

Nigerian Association of Resident Doctors (NARD) formerly known as National Association of Resident Doctors of Nigeria is the parent body of all the chapters of the Association of Resident Doctors (ARD) of Nigeria. It is an affiliate of the Nigerian Medical Association (NMA). It has 76 branches domiciled mainly in Federally and State-owned Teaching Hospitals, Specialist Hospitals and Public health institutions of the Federal Capital Territory. There is a general perception of NARD as the foot soldiers of the NMA. It represents about 40% of Nigerian doctors.

== History ==
The National Association of Resident Doctors (NARD) was formed in 1978 by a coalition of the local ARDs of University College Hospital, Lagos University Teaching Hospital, University of Benin Teaching Hospital, and University of Nigeria Teaching Hospital. Dr. Celestine Odum from (ARD LUTH) was elected the pioneer president of NARD. Unfavourable government policies during the Shehu Shagari regime at the start of the Second Nigerian Republic such as the stoppage of car loans given to medical graduates and other issues bordering on salaries, call duty, structured residency programs and formalization of overseas training ensued. NARD activities were coordinated from LUTH and LUTH ARD contributed significantly to the militarisation of NARD. The relationship between NARD and the NMA served as springboard for agitations in the early 1980s before their eventual proscription on February 22, 1985, by the General Muhammadu Buhari led administration. General Ibrahim Babangida lifted the proscription in order to allow the association participate in national discourse.. The current President of the associastion is Dr. Muhammad Suleiman Usman

=== Agitations ===
NARD has been confronted with challenges relating to the welfare of doctors such as provision of healthcare and accommodation for doctors.

==== 1981 ====
Payment of call duty allowance started in January 1981 following agitations by NARD. A base-down apex-up approach which meant that house officers got the highest allowance while consultants got the lowest was proposed and culminated in a strike action and the government converted it to an apex-down base-up approach in order to break the strike.

==== 1984 ====
The government pronounced that doctors in government hospitals would pay for medical services received in their places of work. This announcement was made against a backdrop of existing displeasure in the abandonment of medical facilities and stoppage of overseas clinical attachments. The government reversed the policy following an ultimatum issued by NARD. Despite this, the doctors insisted on the dispute over abandonment of medical facilities and stoppage of overseas clinical attachments. This was misunderstood as a conspiracy to topple the military government of General Buhari. There was an impasse between both parties and an eventual strike action. This led to the proscription of NMA and NARD in February 1985. The military government sought to arrest the leaders of both associations. The then NARD president, Dr. Adewole (who later became minister of health) fled to the United Kingdom with his family.

==== 2014 ====
The Goodluck Jonathan government suspended residency training in 2014. He ordered the sack of all resident doctors as well as an immediate replacement of all sacked doctors. This occurred during a strike action which commenced on July 1, 2014. The demands were similar to those made during agitations in the 80s including improving facilities, universal health coverage, salary injustices, overseas clinical attachment and salary relativity. The strike attracted attention as it occurred during the Ebola outbreak which affected many West African countries.

==== 2020 ====
In June 2020, NARD staged a week-long strike for issues bordering on pay, inadequate facilities and a lack of personal protective equipment. The strike action was however suspended with a 2-week ultimatum when the Nigerian government expressed commitment to resolve the issues identified.

==== 2021 ====
On April 1, 2021, NARD commenced an indefinite strike following a 60-day ultimatum that was issued to the Nigerian Federal Government. The demands of the strike were payment of delayed salaries, payment of funds for training, life insurance coverage and upward review of hazard pay.

2025 NARD to commence a 2-week strike to demand better working conditions, better pay and structured call hours from the government
