= Olymel =

Canadian meat packing company

Olymel is a Canadian meat packing food processing company, a producer of pork and poultry products, based in Saint-Hyacinthe, Quebec. The company's majority shareholder is Sollio Cooperative Group, previously La Coop fédérée, Canada's largest co-operative company.

It employs more than 10,000 people and exports its products to more than 60 countries. The products are sold under the Olymel, Lafleur, Flamingo, Prince, Galco and La Fernandière brands.

In 2006–2007, the company had a labor dispute with the CSN union.

In 2019, China suspended the meat export permits of Olymel, which affected the company's processing plant in Red Deer, Alberta. According to the Canadian Pork Council, it was caused by mislabelling.

In 2021, there was another labour dispute.
