= 2021 Gorillas strikes =

Series of labor strikes in Germany

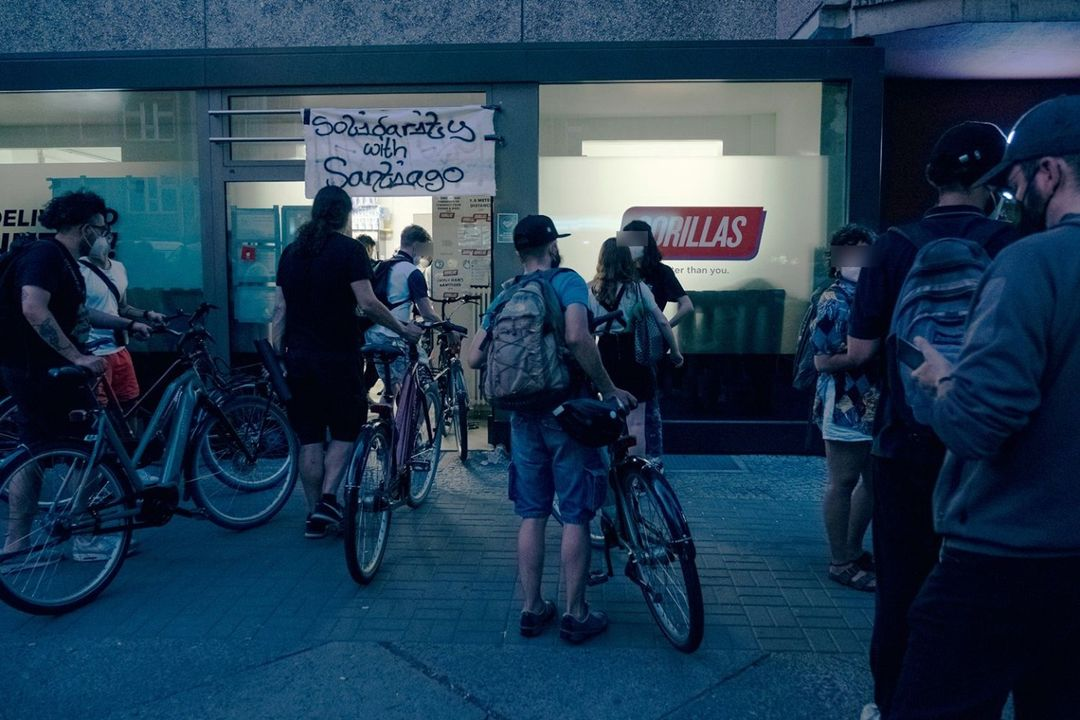
Riders with a strike banner at Berlin Mitte Gorrillas warehouse in Berlin in June 2021

The 2021 Gorillas strikes are a number of labour strikes and protests by workers of Gorillas, an on-demand grocery delivery company in Germany, in 2021.

== Background ==
Gorillas was founded in May 2020 by Kağan Sümer, Jörg Kattner and Ronny Shibley in Berlin. In December 2020 the company raised $44 million in Series A funding, followed by $290 million in Series B funding in March 2021 and almost $1 Billion in Series C funding in October 2021. After the last investment round, the startup is valued at 1 billion, thus reaching unicorn status as the fastest startup ever in Germany (after only 9 months).

== Strike ==
Since its launch, the company has faced a number of concerns over working conditions, including allegations of low pay, being late with payments, understaffing, violating labour laws on time between shifts, problematic behaviour on the part of management, and lack of maintenance on safety equipment. Workers receive a pay of €10.50 per hour and are limited to a twelve-month contract that includes a six-month probationary period. In response to the issues, and following a controversy over workers being expected to make deliveries in snow without being issued winter gear, workers at the company began discussions about creating a union in February 2021, later leading to the creation of the Gorillas Workers Collective.

In early June, a wildcat strike was held by workers in Berlin, protesting against the firing of one of their colleagues and demanding an end to workers being fired without warning. Both Green Party and The Left party politicians visited the strike to express support. Police were called in after a number of strikebreakers attempted to cross the picket line and caused a confrontation. The company eventually announced it would be shutting down that warehouse for the day.

In late June 2021, several hundred workers at the company raised concerns about being handed inaccurate paychecks, being paid less than the hours they had worked. On 28 June, the Gorillas Workers Collective organised a protest outside of the company's headquarters. In response, CEO Kağan Sümer released a statement saying that the company had identified 250 payment issues and would be taking action to rectify them, albeit without providing any dates as to when the issues would be resolved.

In July, the Gorillas Workers Collective launched a number of strikes and protests. On July 17, workers undertook a mobile strike, cycling to several different warehouses to temporarily halt company activities. CEO Sümer promised in July that he would never fire anyone because of a strike.

On 8 October, however, it was reported that the company had fired several hundred employees for taking part in the strikes. Although it refused to disclose how many workers had been fired, the company confirmed that a number of workers had been fired, stating that "we are compelled to enforce our rights in accordance with the existing legal framework and have decided to dismiss the employees who actively participated in these unauthorised strikes and blockades."
