= Gewerkschaft Deutscher Lokomotivführer =

German trade union

The Gewerkschaft Deutscher Lokomotivführer (GDL, engl.: Union of German Train Drivers) is a German trade union that represents workers in train companies. It is a member organization of the German Civil Service Federation of civil service trade unions. Until 2002, the GDL was limited to train drivers, which is the reason for its name. As a train workers union, the GDL is in competition with the bigger Eisenbahn- und Verkehrsgewerkschaft (EVG) which is part of the DGB federation of trade unions. It has a membership of nearly 40,000.

== 2007 strike ==
In August 2007 the GDL planned to strike after talks failed with Deutsche Bahn, the main German railway operator, over a range of demands from the union. A key disagreement was GDL's wish to represent its members in collective bargaining processes, independently of other unions representing staff in that job category.

On 8 August 2007, the labour court in Nuremberg declared that a strike of affected long-distance and goods services would be illegal if carried out before 30 September, claiming it would affect the national economy too severely.

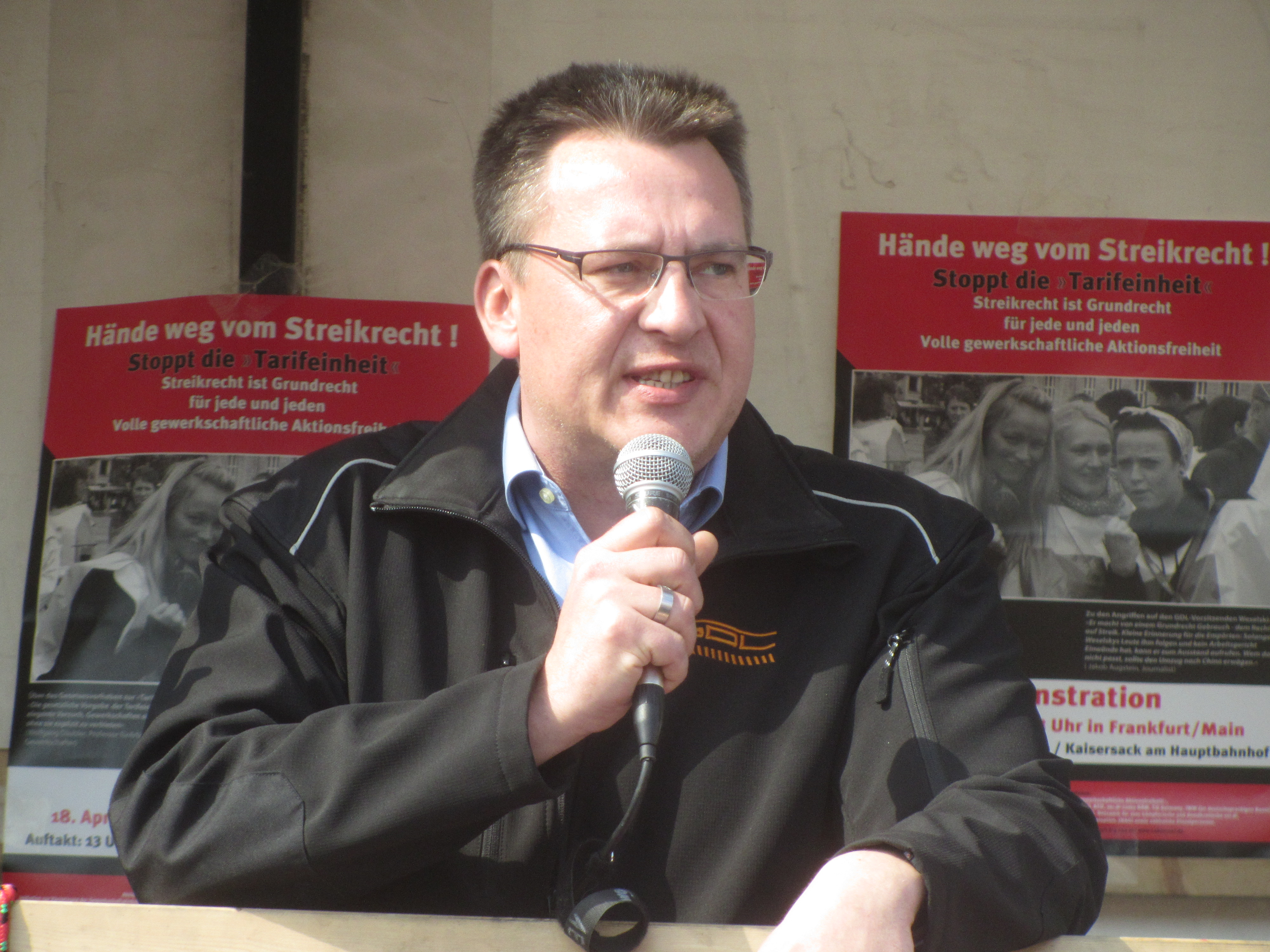
Deputy chairperson Norbert Quitter speaking at the closing rally of the demonstration in defense of the right to strike on April 18, 2015, in Frankfurt am Main

On 2 November 2007, the labour court in Chemnitz overturned a previous judgement limiting strike action to short-haul routes. After the decision the GDL declared a three-day strike. It was the first national rail strike since 1992 and of unprecedented duration. The strike ended as the union had planned, at 2:00 a.m. CET on the morning of Saturday, November 17, 2007, but without a new contract.

On 19 November 2007 the labour court in Nuremberg admonished Deutsche Bahn for its practice of contacting multiple labour courts around the country to try and obtain an injunction against strike action, which it regarded as misuse of the legal system.

== 2014 and 2015 strikes ==
In 2014 the GDL started a series of strikes of the German railway system as a result of Deutsche Bahn declining its demands for a shorter working week (reduced from 39 hours to 37 hours), for a 5% pay increase and for the right to independently represent 17,000 railway workers not working as engine drivers in collective bargaining processes. Deutsche Bahn maintained that it would only enter collective bargaining with a single trade union per job grouping, as was the case until June 2014 when GDL had an agreement with the much larger EVG union.

The strikes continued in 2015 with a three-day railway strike starting on 21 April 2015, the GDL's seventh strike in 10 months. This was followed by a strike from 4–10 May, the longest strike in Deutsche Bahn's history. A further strike started on 19 May 2015 and finished on 21 May as the GDL and Deutsche Bahn agreed to allow arbitration to resolve the conflict.

== 2023 and 2024 strikes ==
On 16 November 2023, the GDL staged a 20 hour strike. On December 8, 2023, the GDL then staged another strike, this time lasting 24 hours. These two strikes in December 2023 were considered to be "warning strikes." As neither of the two "warning strikes" would result in progress for contract negotiations between the GDL and Deutsche Bahn, the GDL soon announced plans for longer strikes "after January 8." On 10 January 2024, the GDL began a three day strike. On 24 January 2024, the GDL began a six-day strike, their longest ever.
