= 2021 Korean Confederation of Trade Unions strike =

2021 South Korean general strike

The 2021 Korean Confederation of Trade Unions strike was a general strike organised by the Korean Confederation of Trade Unions in October 2021.

== Background ==
The Korean Confederation of Trade Unions (KCTU), literally translated as National Democratic Confederation of Trade Unions, also known as Minju-nochong (Korean: 민주노총; acronym for KCTU in Korean) is a national trade union centre officially established in 1995. Following the 2016–17 South Korean protests (Candlelight Demonstrations), the KCTU has seen accelerated growth in union enrollment, reaching 963,035 members in 2018 and making it the largest industrial union confederation in Korea.

== Strike ==
On 3 July, around 8000 KCTU workers rallied in downtown Seoul, calling for better pay and better safety measures against workplace accidents. The rally had originally been planned to take place in Yeouido, but police had barricaded the area. The government had refused to issue a permit for the rally, citing COVID restrictions. However, only 3 workers tested positive for COVID-19 in the aftermath of the rally. On 23 July, around 400 KCTU members held a rally in Wonju calling for better working conditions, despite several hundred police attempting to disperse the rally.

In mid-August, an arrest warrant was issued for Yang Kyung-soo, the president of the KCTU, on the pretext of having violated COVID-19 social distancing requirements. On 2 September, he was arrested by South Korea police. The KCTU reacted to the arrest by releasing a statement calling it "a declaration of war by the Moon Jae-in government" and vowed to stage a "strong strike."

On 10 October, the Seoul city council announced that it would prohibit the KCTU from holding rallies in the city that month. On 14 October, the KCTU stated that it intended to hold the general strike the following week. Among the key demands of the strike would be better working conditions and regularisation for irregular workers, an increase in the minimum wage, and a greater focus on labour rights during the upcoming 2022 South Korean presidential election.

On 19 October, Prime Minister Kim Boo-kyum called for the KCTU to call off the strike, stating that "this general strike is by no means helpful to the safety of the community and is just irresponsible." President Moon Jae-in also call for the union to stop the strike, stating that it was instead "a critical time for the entire nation to prepare for daily recovery in November with one mind." The conservative New National Council of Student Representatives put up posters around 100 higher education campuses criticising the strike, stating that it would file a police report against the union and that the union was "ignoring the hopes of 7 million small business owners."

On 20 October, around 550 000 KCTU members walked off their jobs, with a further 80 000 participating in large rallies across 13 different cities. In Seoul, around 12 000 police were deployed to prevent the workers from holding a rally in Gwanghwamun Plaza, additionally blocking nearby metro stations. Some strikers reported clashes with the police after the rally began marching towards Seodaemun Station, as the police attempted to break up the rally. The police later stated that it intended to prosecute the organisers of the rally for breaching COVID-19 restrictions.
