= Gorillas (company) =

Grocery delivery company

- Industry: Online platform for convenience delivery
- Founded: May 2020; 6 years ago, in Berlin, Germany
- Founders: Jörg Kattner; Kağan Sümer; Ronny Shibley; (co-founder)
- Defunct: May 2024
- Headquarters: Berlin, Germany
- Areas served: Germany, Netherlands, United Kingdom, United States, Spain, Italy, France
- Owner: Independent (2020–22); Getir (2022–present)
- Number of employees: ~10,000; (as of November 2022)
- Website: gorillas.io/en

Gorillas was a German ultrafast grocery delivery company which used dark stores between its founding in 2020 and its end in May 2024. Users could order grocery products through the Gorillas app.

In December 2022, the company was acquired by Getir. As of July 2023, it operates in around 35 cities from roughly 130 locations in four countries. It sold its Belgium operations to Efarmz and withdrew from Italy, Spain, Denmark, and most recently France.

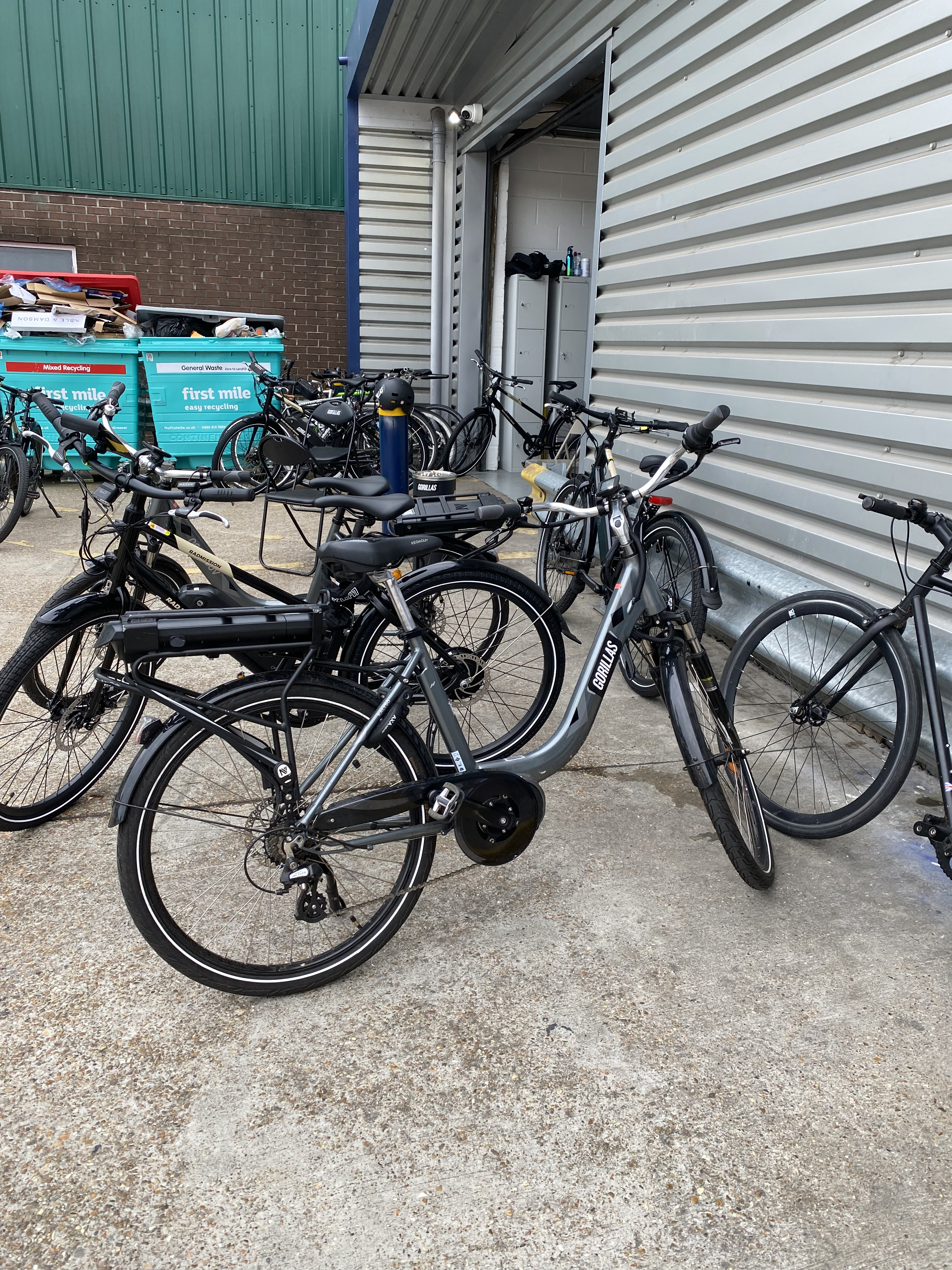
Gorillas bikes outside one of its dark stores

In June 2023, it was announced that Getir-owned Gorillas would begin withdrawing from France. In April 2024, Getir and Gorillas announced their withdrawal from all its operating locations with only Getir remaining in operation in its home market of Turkey.

== History ==
The company was founded in May 2020 by Kağan Sümer, Jörg Kattner, Jeff Hester, and Ronny Shibley in Berlin. They aimed to deliver groceries and other supermarket goods ordered through its app by bike courier, charging supermarket prices.

Initially starting in Berlin, it rapidly spread to dozens of European cities and expanded in America. In 2022, Gorillas operated in multiple cities including Amsterdam, London, Paris, Munich and New York, USA.

In December 2020, the company raised $44 million in Series A funding, followed by $290 million in Series B funding in March 2021 and almost $1 billion in Series C funding in October 2021. The last investment round, valued the startup at 1 billion, making it a unicorn in just 9 months, the fastest company in Germany to do so.

Sümer stated in 2022 that his aim was to raise $700 million of new financing to expand the company and make it profitable.

In June 2022, Gorillas announced it would launch its own products for sale in Germany, France, the Netherlands and England. Items sold under Gorillas' label include spreads, pasta, coffee and beer.

Following its rapid expansion in the first two years of its existence, Gorillas failed to live up to financial expectations. As a consequence, in 2022, it ended operations in Belgium, Italy and Spain. In England, it closed all operations with the exception of those in London. It also cancelled plans to enter other markets such as Switzerland and Australia.

In December 2022, Getir, a competitor based in Istanbul, acquired Gorillas for $1.2 billion.

== Business model ==
Gorillas' slogan was faster than you, emphasizing speedy delivery.

The business model was based on that of goPuff, which was founded in Philadelphia in 2013.

Gorillas sold over 3600 products including fresh fruit and vegetables, drinks and some household items, which were delivered by bicycle couriers. Food not sold within the best-before date was either given employees, given to charity or local food banks, or sold to customers at a significant discount.

== Controversies ==
Some employees have criticized Gorillas for bad working conditions, including inadequate equipment, pressure to deliver quickly, and deliveries weighing too much, causing many to complain of back pain. Riders also report not being paid correctly or on time.

In October 2021, Gorillas fired 350 employees in Berlin for participating in a wildcat strike. According to the Gorillas Workers Collective, which "represents the company's non-unionised delivery workers".

In November 2021, the company purchased 1,200 state-of-the-art e-bikes specially designed to meet its cyclists' needs and renewed all its cyclists' equipment including PPE. The company said that it offered its 10,000 employees benefits including health insurance, a salary above the minimum wage, paid leave and a complete riders' kit. In Germany, the Netherlands and England, Gorillas introduced a bonus scheme for its riders.

In February 2023, The Independent reported that Gorillas' “Whatever London Wants” advertising campaign had been "banned over ‘irresponsible’ drug, sex and alcohol content" and for "featuring 'irresponsible' references to drug use and excessive alcohol consumption." The watchdog stated "that the adverts normalised illicit drug use and harmful drinking."

== Investments ==
Gorillas has been the focus of high-value investments since it was founded. Gorillas' value in round A funds rose by $44 million in December 2020, in round B financing by $290 million in March 2021, and in round C funds by approximately $1 billion in October 2021. The company acquired French competitor Frichti and entered into an alliance with Just Eat.

== Locations ==
Gorillas used to operate in around 35 cities across four countries, prior to it closing permanently in May 2024.

Country	Cities
Germany	Augsburg, Berlin, Bonn, Bremen, Cologne, Darmstadt, Dresden, Düsseldorf, Essen, Frankfurt, Fürth, Hamburg, Hannover, Heidelberg, Karlsruhe, Leipzig, Mannheim, Munich, Nuremberg, Offenbach, Stuttgart
Netherlands	Amsterdam, Arnhem, Groningen, The Hague, Haarlem, Nijmegen, Rotterdam, Utrecht
United Kingdom	London
United States	New York City

== See also ==
- Online food ordering
