= 2021 Danish nurses' strike =

The 2021 Danish nurses strike was a labour strike by nurses in Denmark. Represented by the Danish Nurses' Organization (in Danish Dansk Sygeplejeråd, abbrev. DSR), the nurses went on strike in search of better pay beginning in mid-June 2021. The strike was ended in August 2021 when the Danish Parliament imposed a pay deal on the nurses. It was one of the longest strikes in the history of Denmark.

== Background ==
The Danish Nurses' Organization (in Danish Dansk Sygeplejeråd, abbrev. DSR) is a trade union in Denmark. It represents 95% of all nurses with a membership of 75,000.

Trade unions (Danish: Fagforeninger) have a long tradition in Scandinavian and Nordic society, with a strong emphasis placed on the importance of collective agreements between trade unions and employers. As a result, the Danish government rarely intervenes in pay disputes, intervening only as a last resort.

== Strike ==
In March 2021, nurses in Denmark voted against a pay deal negotiated by the DSR that would've given them a 5% salary increase over three years, over concerns that the increase would not compensate for several years worth of low salary increases, leaving nurses underpaid. On 22 April, the DSR formally issued a strike notice, to begin in May with 10% of the total workforce and gradually increasing, although without including those taking care of COVID-19 patients, cancer patients, children, and psychiatric patients.

However, the initial strike notice was temporarily called off after negotiations between the DSR and the government resulted in an agreement for mediation, and eventually a new proposed agreement. The new proposed agreement was subsequently rejected by the nurses, with two-thirds of DSR membership voting against it in June, setting the stage for strike action to begin.

On 19 June, the first nurses walked off the job, numbered around 5400 in total, launching the strike. On 10 August, no new agreement reached, the DSR announced that the strike would be extended. The DSR also announced potential new extensions throughout the rest of August, if no deal could be reached before then.

On 26 August, after negotiations with opposition parties, the Danish government announced that it would be able to secure a 75% in a parliamentary vote to impose a pay deal on the nurses, the required supermajority in the law for such a move. Health Minister Magnus Heunicke stated that the government would be introducing a bill to break the strike the next day, imposing the terms that the nurses had rejected earlier in the year, stating that "for each week the conflict is allowed to continue, the backlog of treatments is extended by 10 weeks." At that point, the Danish Health Authority estimated that 35 500 operations had had to be delayed due to the strike. The bill was opposed by the Red–Green Alliance and the Danish People's Party.

Throughout September and October, however, despite the strike having legally been ended, a number of nurses engaged in wildcat strike action.
