= Mill Creek (Marion County, Oregon) =

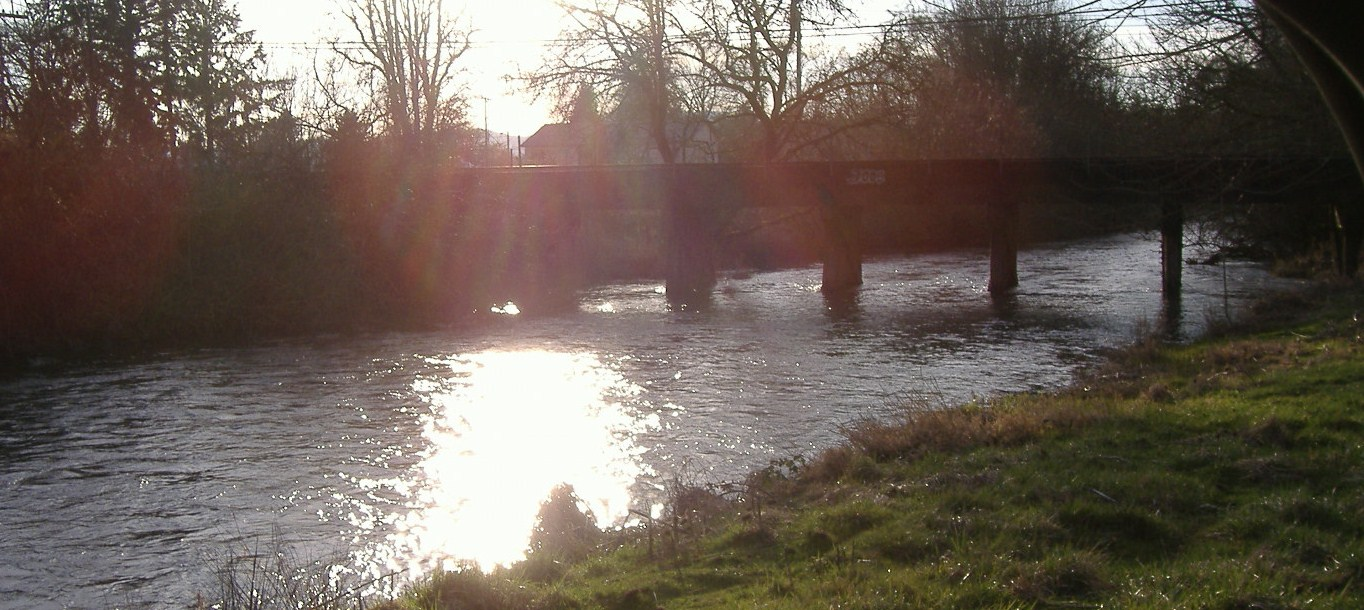
- Mill Creek at Turner

- Location of the mouth of Mill Creek in Oregon
- Etymology: A 19th-century sawmill along the creek

Location
- Country: United States
- State: Oregon
- County: Marion

Physical characteristics
- Source: Coon Hollow
  - location: east of Sublimity
  - coordinates: 44°49′54″N 122°42′19″W
  - elevation: 841 ft (256 m)
- Mouth: Willamette River
  - location: Salem
  - coordinates: 44°57′05″N 123°02′17″W
  - elevation: 125 ft (38 m)
- Length: 25.7 mi (41.4 km)
- Basin size: 111 sq mi (290 km^{2})

Mill Creek is a 26-mile (42 km) tributary of the Willamette River that drains a 111-square-mile (290 km^{2}) area of Marion County in the U.S. state of Oregon. Flowing generally west from its source south of Silver Falls State Park, it flows between the cities of Stayton, and Sublimity to the north of Stayton, and merges with the Stayton mill race east of Aumsville before flowing through Aumsville and Turner and emptying into the Willamette in Salem.

Salem's first gristmill and sawmill were built on the creek in 1840–41 by members of the Oregon Mission.

== Course ==
Mill Creek begins at the confluence of South Fork Mill Creek and North Fork Mill Creek in Coon Hollow, about 4 miles (6.4 km) east of Sublimity. It flows generally west, passing under Oregon Route 22 between Sublimity, to the creek's right, and Stayton, to the left. Near river mile (RM) 18 or river kilometer (RK) 29, the creek receives Salem Ditch from the left; the ditch transports water from the North Santiam River to Mill Creek. The creek reaches Aumsville, on the stream's right, at RM 15 (RK 24), and Beaver Creek enters from the right just beyond RM 12 (RK 19).

The creek bisects Turner, situated 10 miles (16 km) from the mouth. At Turner, Franzen Reservoir is to the right, and Perrin Lateral enters from the left; like Salem Ditch, it is an artificial channel that carries water from the North Santiam River to Mill Creek. Slightly west of Turner, Mill Creek receives Battle Creek from the left and turns north, passing under Salem–Turner Road at about RM 7 (RK 11).

Less than 2 miles (3 km) further downstream, Mill Creek passes under Interstate 5, which it parallels for about 1 mile (2 km) before passing under Route 22 again and turning northwest. Along the I-5 stretch, Walter Wirth Lake and McNary Field (Salem Municipal Airport) are on the left; near Route 22, the unincorporated neighborhood of Four Corners is on the right. At RM 3.5 (RK 5.6), the creek intersects Shelton Ditch, an artificial channel on the left that diverts water from Mill Creek to Pringle Creek.

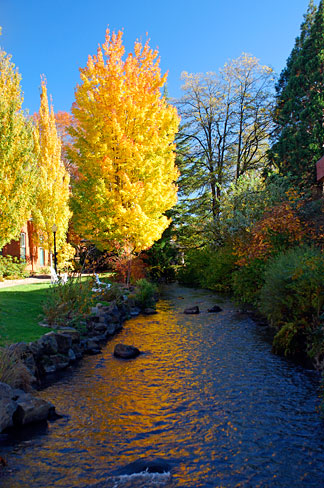
The Mill Race as it winds through the campus of Willamette University in Salem.

Cutting through central Salem, the creek intersects Mill Race (another artificial channel diverting water to Pringle Creek) at RM 2.3 (RK 3.7). After passing a stream gauge at RM 1.1 (RK 1.8), Mill Creek flows by the Oregon State Penitentiary, on the right, the Oregon State Capitol, on the left, and North Salem High School, on the right. The creek enters the Willamette River in downtown Salem, opposite Wallace Park, about 84 miles (135 km) from the larger stream's confluence with the Columbia River.

== Watershed ==
Most of the land in the watershed is privately owned. As of 2006, about 75 percent was used for farming, 13 percent for forestry, and 12 percent was urban. Urban uses accounted for most of the land from Turner westward to Salem.

Franzen Reservoir, along Mill Creek near Turner, stores drinking water, which comes from the North Santiam River, for Salem. Two diversion channels from Mill Creek to Pringle Creek help control flooding in Salem.

== History ==
Mill Creek was named for a sawmill built along its banks as part of a 19th-century Methodist mission. The mission, established by Jason Lee, began operations in 1834 near what later became Salem, and the mill is thought to date to 1840–41. A canal between Mill Creek and the North Santiam River was completed in 1857 to increase water flow to the mill. The canal was later called the Salem Ditch.

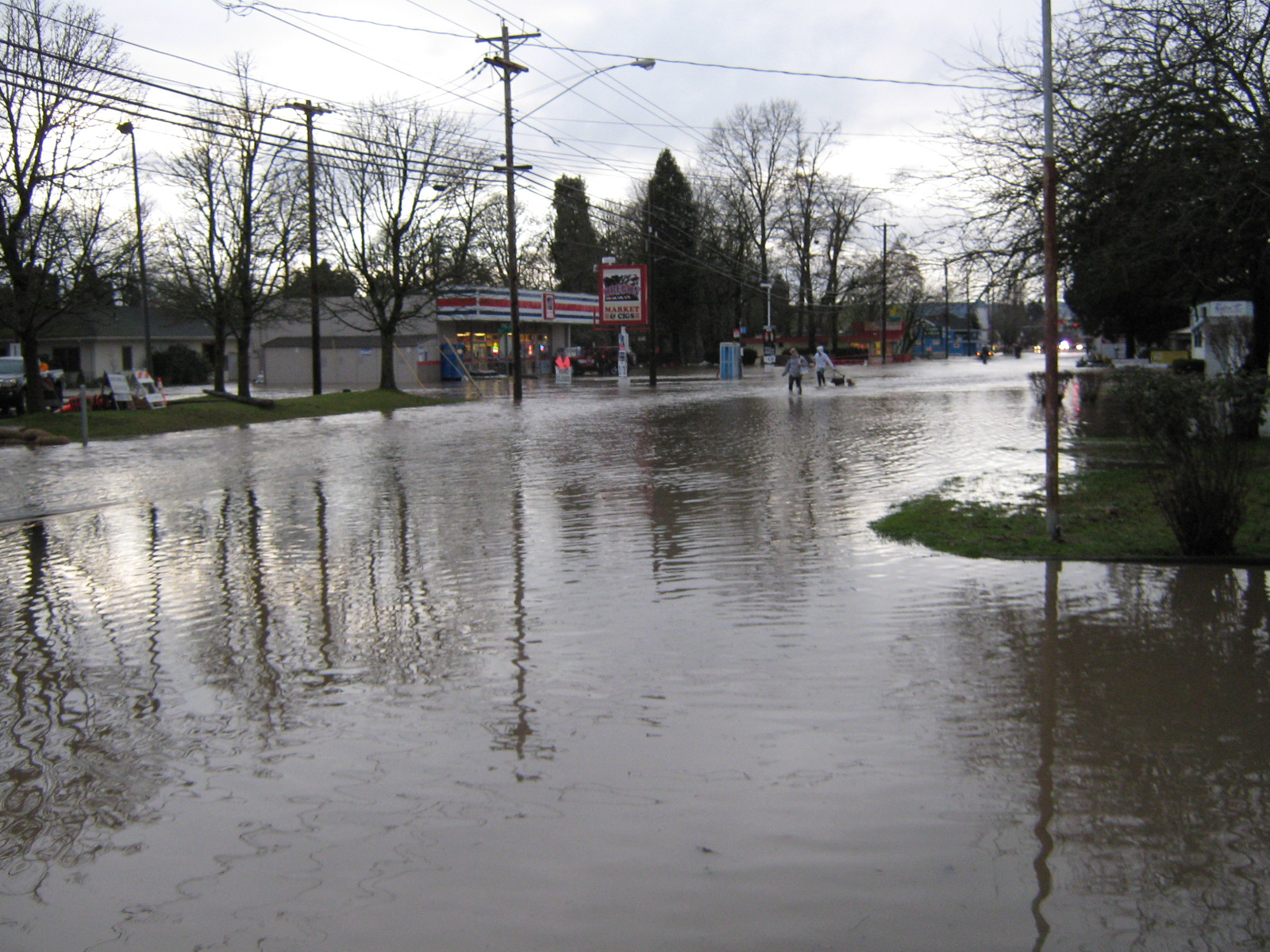
Flooding along State Street in Salem in January 2012

Artificial structures built in the mid-19th century altered the course of the original lower reaches of Mill Creek. Waller Dam, built around 1864 and modified in 1915, split Mill Creek into a millrace and what is sometimes referred to as North Mill Creek. The millrace, which originally powered a woolen mill, flows through the Willamette University campus.

Another diversion canal, Shelton Ditch, built in the mid-1800s, runs from Mill Creek near the municipal airport through the southern edge of downtown Salem. It empties into Pringle Creek near Pringle Park.

In January 2012, heavy rain from a winter storm caused many Oregon streams, including Mill Creek, to overflow their banks. Muddy water from the creek covered some of Salem's streets and parking lots and ran into homes and basements. Further upstream, an estimated 40 percent of the city of Turner was inundated when Mill Creek rose 2.5 feet (0.76 m) above flood stage.

== See also ==
- List of rivers of Oregon
