= Shelton Ditch =

Canal in Marion County, Oregon, U.S.

Coordinates: 44.925953°N 123.00954°W

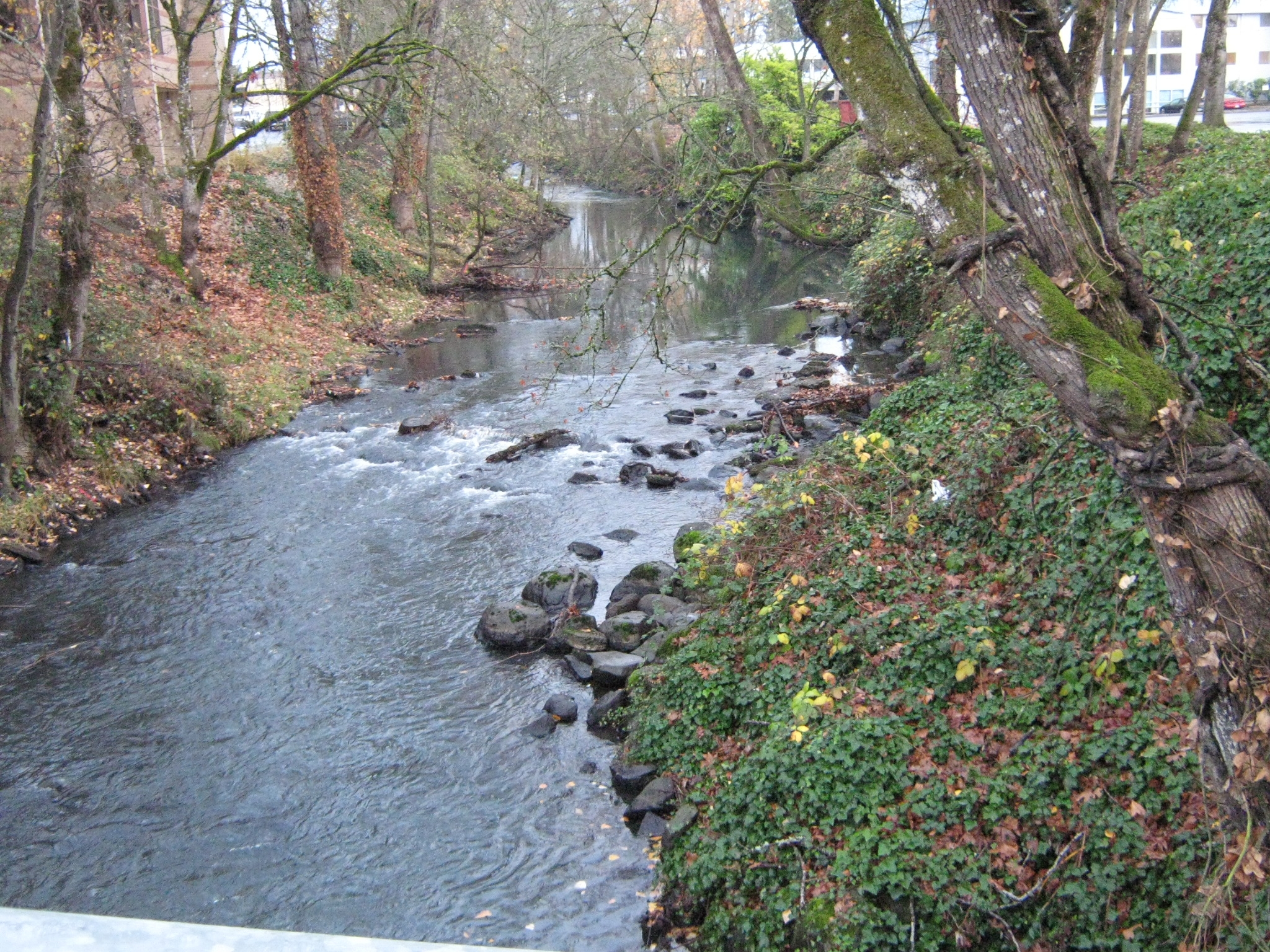
Shelton Ditch at 12th Street

Shelton Ditch is an artificial canal in Marion County, Oregon, United States. Built in the mid-19th century, it originates from Mill Creek east of Airport Road in Salem, passes through a corner of the Salem main Post Office property, and along the southern edge of downtown Salem. Shelton Ditch passes by the north side of Pringle Park before emptying into Pringle Creek. After the Mill Race joins Pringle Creek near Salem's city hall, Pringle Creek passes under Commercial Street and empties into the Willamette River next to Riverfront Park across from Minto-Brown Island Park.

Shelton Ditch passes along the edge of Salem Hospital's property. This has been a problem in the past as Shelton Ditch is prone to flooding, necessitating evacuation of the hospital's patients, including during the Christmas flood of 1964.

== See also ==
- List of canals in Oregon
