= Pringle Creek (Willamette River tributary) =

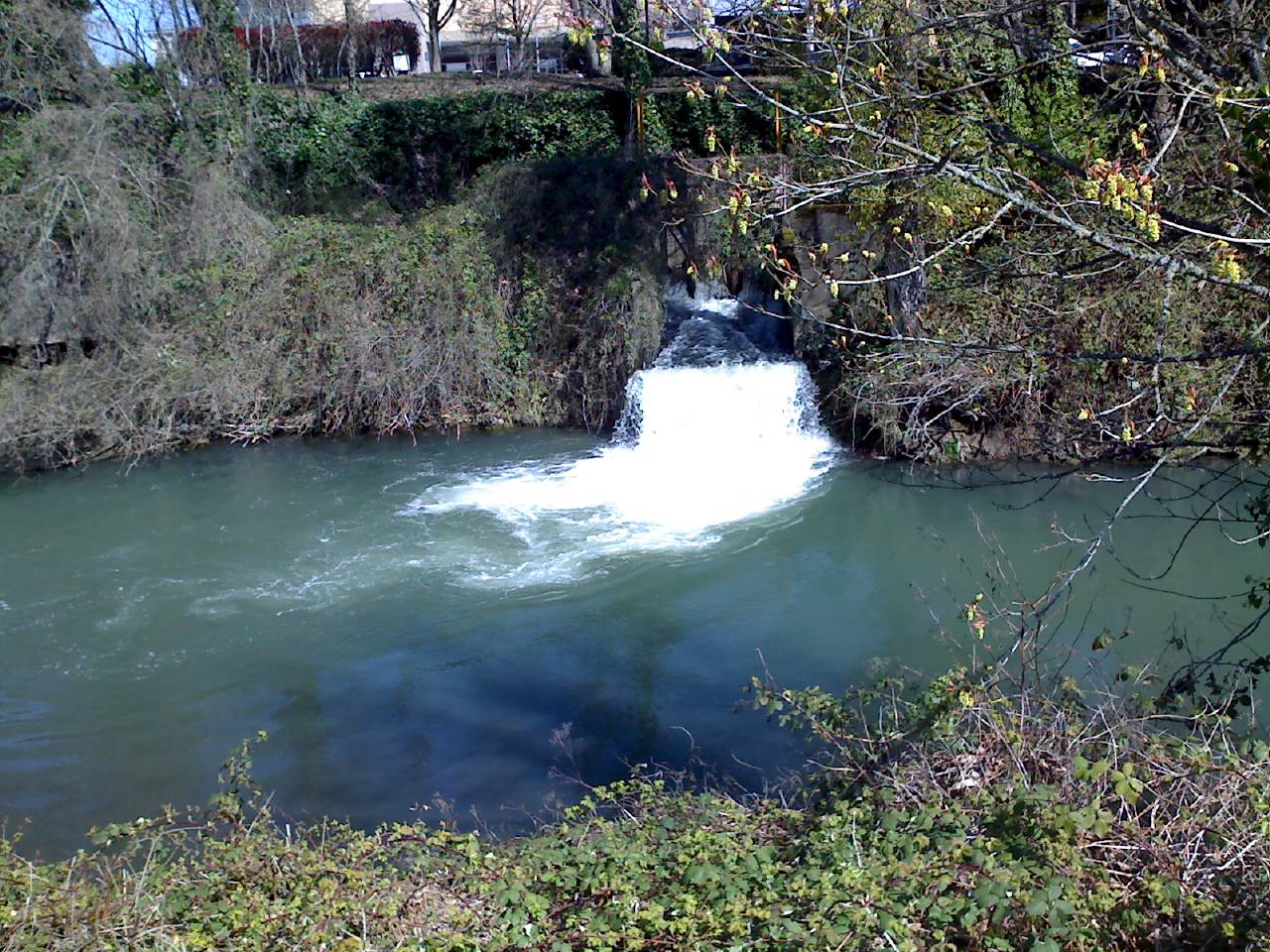
- The millrace flowing into Pringle Creek

- Location of the mouth of Pringle Creek in Oregon
- Etymology: Virgil K. Pringle, an early settler near the creek

Location
- Country: United States
- State: Oregon
- County: Marion

Physical characteristics
- Source
  - location: Salem Hills
  - coordinates: 44°53′12″N 123°03′48″W
  - elevation: 517 ft (158 m)
- Mouth: Willamette River
  - location: Salem
  - coordinates: 44°56′18″N 123°02′37″W
  - elevation: 144 ft (44 m)
- Basin size: 15 sq mi (39 km^{2})

Pringle Creek is a small tributary of the Willamette River that drains a 15-square-mile (39 km^{2}) area of Marion County in the U.S. state of Oregon. The entire watershed lies within the urban growth boundary of the City of Salem. Pringle Creek's tributaries include Clark Creek, West Fork Pringle Creek, West Middle Fork and East Fork.

== Course ==
Pringle Creek consists of a network of small streams with courses greatly altered since the 19th century by urban development. The streams flow on the surface in places, in pipes and culverts in other places, and have been otherwise modified by artificial inflows and diversions.

West Fork Pringle Creek begins in springs southwest of the main stem and flows generally north and slightly east to its confluence with East Fork Pringle Creek near 14th Street and Oxford Street. East Fork Pringle Creek and West Middle Fork Pringle Creek drain farm fields near Interstate 5 southeast of downtown Salem. East Fork Pringle Creek flows generally northwest, receiving the north-flowing West Middle Fork from the left slightly upstream of the larger stream's confluence with West Fork Pringle Creek.

Clark Creek, another small tributary rising south of the city's center, enters Pringle Creek from the left at Bush's Pasture Park. Pringle Creek then flows between the park and Deepwood Estate, crosses under Mission Street, flows between Salem Cardiology and the site of the former Oregon School for the Blind on the left and Salem Hospital and Pringle Park on the right. After passing under the hospital, the creek receives Shelton Ditch, which carries water diverted from Mill Creek, from the right. Pringle Creek then flows through Pringle Plaza to Mirror Pond, where the Mill Race, another diversion from Mill Creek, enters from the right. The combined waters then flow under a small bridge on Commercial Street and past a modern apartment complex that sits on land that was previously occupied by a Boise Cascade mill. The creek then empties into Willamette Slough on the Willamette River.

== Watershed ==
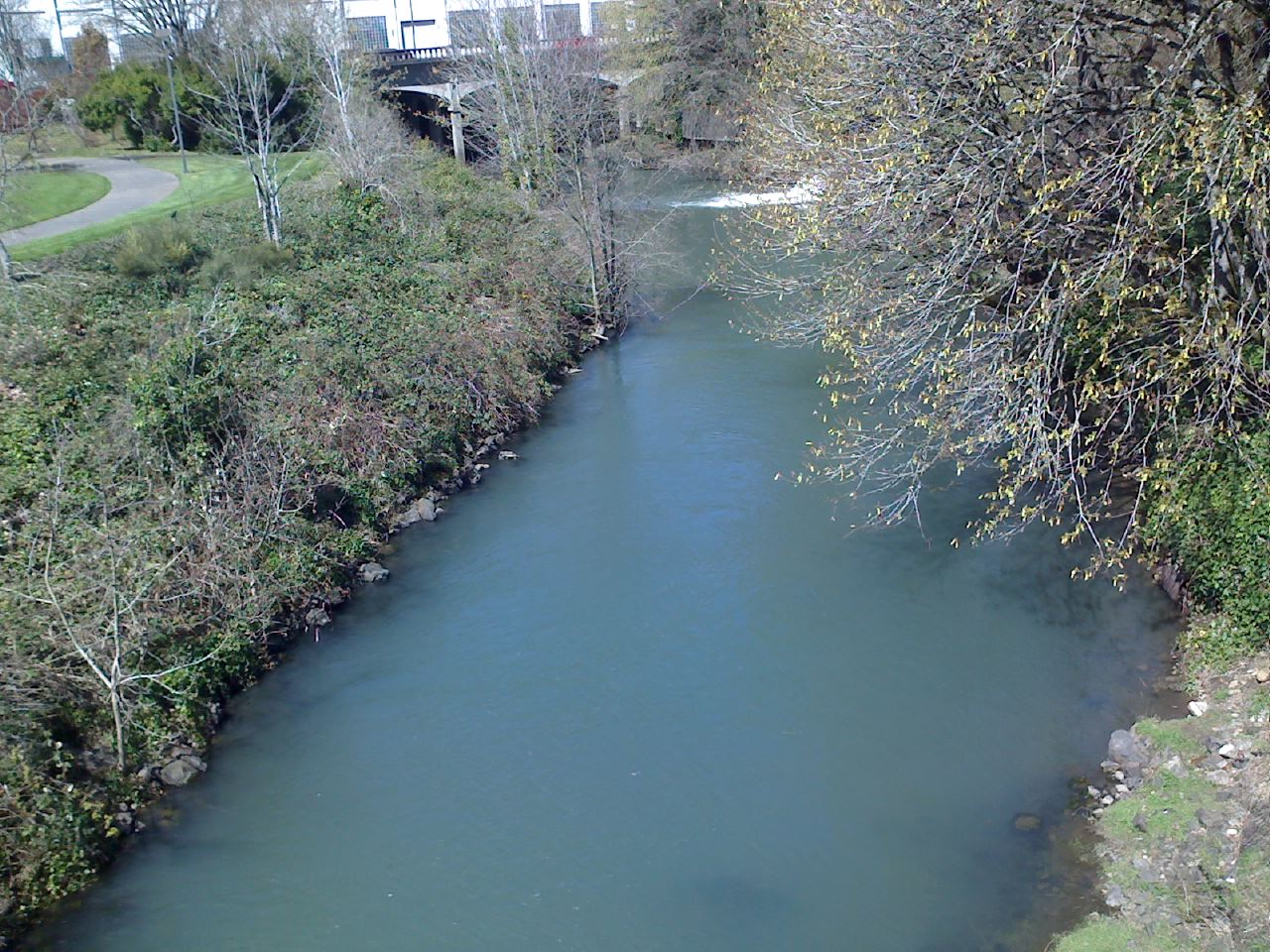
Pringle Creek from Liberty Street in Salem

Pringle Creek's drainage basin lies within the Salem urban growth boundary. Small watersheds that border the basin are Croisan Creek to the west, Willamette Slough East to the west and northwest, Mill Creek to the north and east, and Battle Creek to the south.

About 60 percent of the watershed was developed as urban in 2002, while about 27 percent was used for farming. The main crops grown in the basin are grass seed and hay. McNary Field (Salem Municipal Airport) and the site of the former Fairview Training Center are in the Pringle Creek basin.

== History ==
The creek is named for Virgil K. Pringle, who emigrated from Missouri to Oregon in 1846 and settled a donation land claim near the stream. The Southern Pacific Railroad, which later built a South Salem station in the vicinity, changed its name to Pringle in 1925. The station closed in the 1980s, but the name is still used by a post office branch and a shopping center.

== See also ==
- List of rivers of Oregon

== Works cited ==
- HDR Engineering, Inc.; Barney and Worth, Inc. (2008). "Pringle Creek Watershed Management Plan" (PDF). City of Salem.
- Hemesath, Lisa; Nunez, Tina (2002). "Pringle, Glenn-Gibson, Claggett, and Mill Creek Watershed Assessment" (PDF). Greater Salem–Keizer Area Watershed Councils.
