= St. Boniface Church (Sublimity, Oregon) =

Coordinates: 44.829476°N 122.790162°W

- Interactive map of the St. Boniface Church area

General information
- Architectural style: Carpenter Gothic
- Location: 375 SE Church St., Sublimity, Oregon, United States
- Construction started: 1889
- Completed: 1889

Technical details
- Structural system: Wood frame

St. Boniface Church is a historic Roman Catholic church building in Sublimity, Oregon, United States built in 1889.

== Description ==
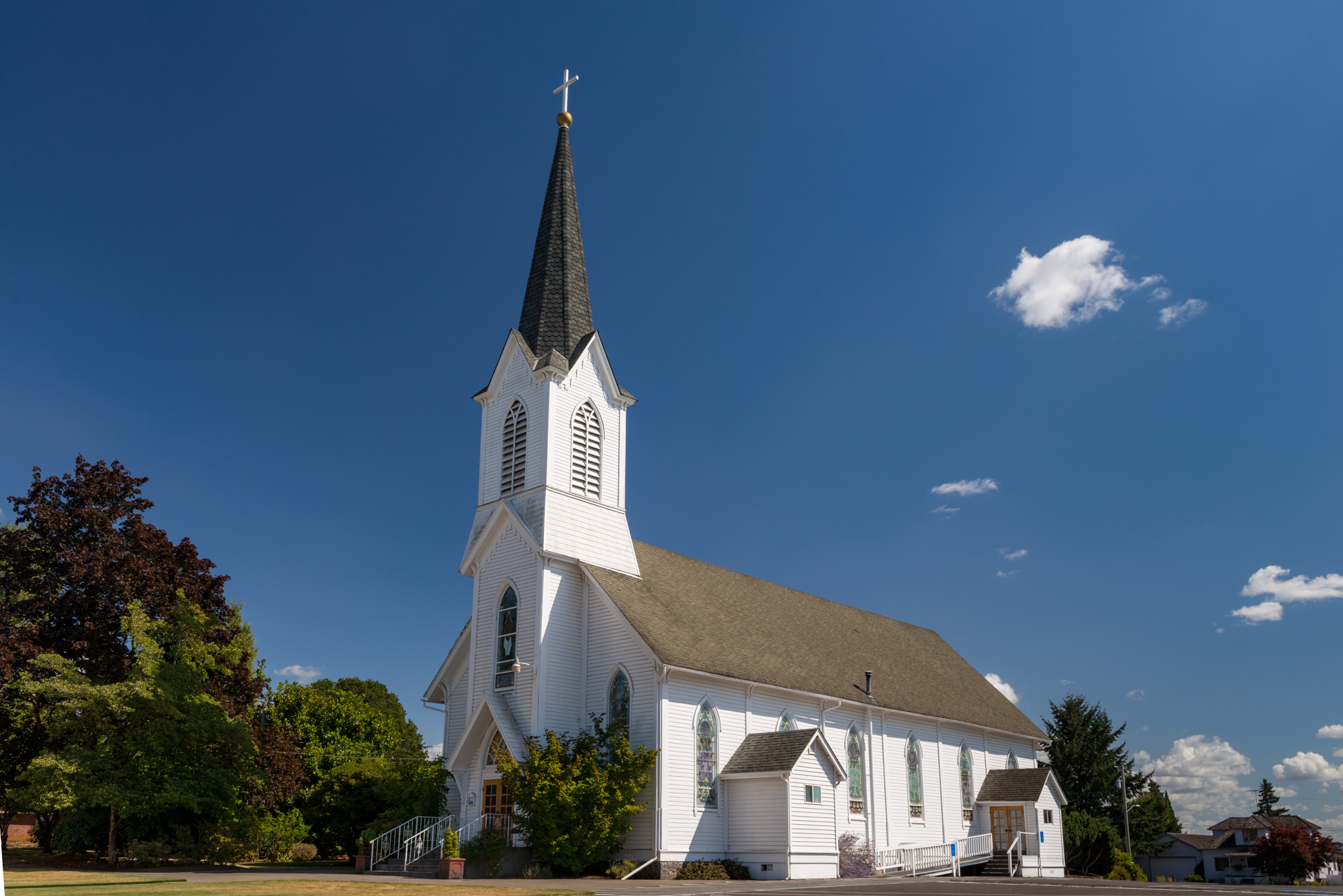
St. Boniface Catholic Church, Sublimity. St. Boniface Catholic Church in Sublimity was built in 1889.

St. Boniface is construction in the Carpenter Gothic style of architecture, it is a massive six-bay wooden structure with lancet stained glass windows and a steep sloping roof. The cross-adorned steeple above its front entrance reaches to a height of 110 feet above the ground. A historic cemetery adjoins the church building on one side.

== History ==
The first Catholics came to Sublimity in the 1870s. They were German immigrant farmers who came by rail from states like Minnesota, Wisconsin and Nebraska. Originally, services were held in private homes. The first priest, Fr. Peter Juvenal Stampfl, arrived in 1879. He made the first entry in St. Boniface's parish records on December 3, 1879.

St. Boniface Church is still an active parish in the Roman Catholic Archdiocese of Portland. Fr. Paul Materu is the current pastor.
