= Walter Wirth Lake =

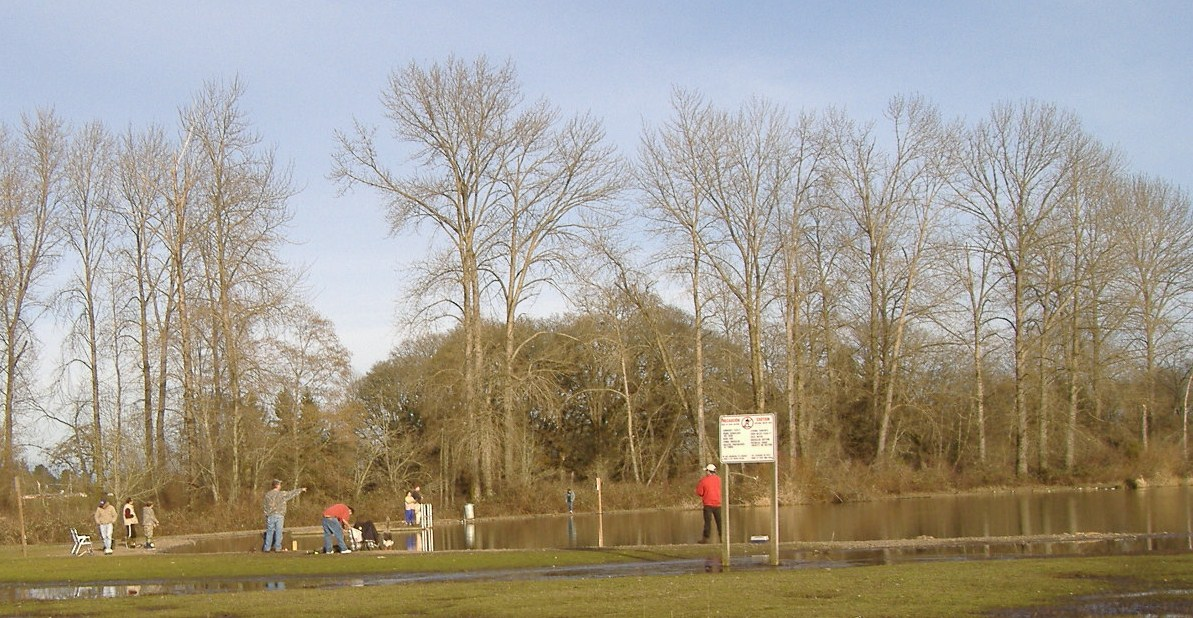
- Anglers

- Location within Oregon Location within the United States
- Location: Salem, Oregon
- Coordinates: 44°54.6′N 122°59.4′W
- Type: Quarry Lake
- Primary inflows: Mill Creek
- Primary outflows: Mill Creek
- Basin countries: United States
- Surface area: 20.56 acres (8.32 ha)
- Surface elevation: 203 ft (62 m)
- Islands: 0.34-acre (1,400 m^{2}) unnamed

Walter Wirth Lake (aka Lake Wirth) is a lake in Salem, Oregon, United States. Walter Wirth Lake is wholly contained within Cascades Gateway Park. The park and lake began development in 1957 with the Salem Area Chamber of Commerce working with the State Highway Department to convert a gravel burrow pit into a park.

Original development of the park included a swimming area, paddle boats, a children's zoo, and concession stands. In 1976, a Department of Environmental Quality study determined the lake to be suffering the effects from upstream polluters closing the lake to swimming. Since that time the lake has held numerous programs in canoeing, sailing, and fishing, it is now open for swimming again.

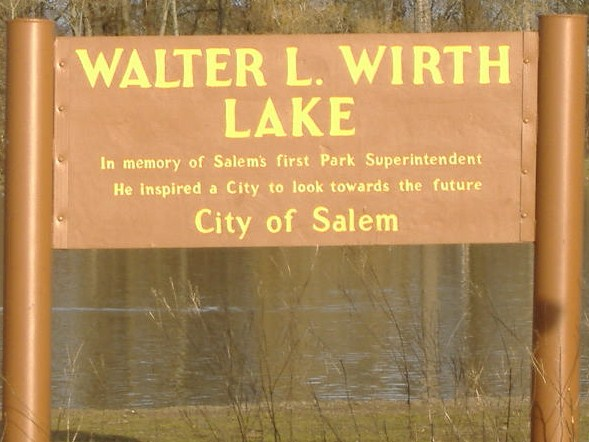
Walter Wirth lake sign

== See also ==
- List of lakes in Oregon
