= Salem Ditch =

Canal in Marion County, Oregon, U.S.

Salem Ditch Stayton Canal
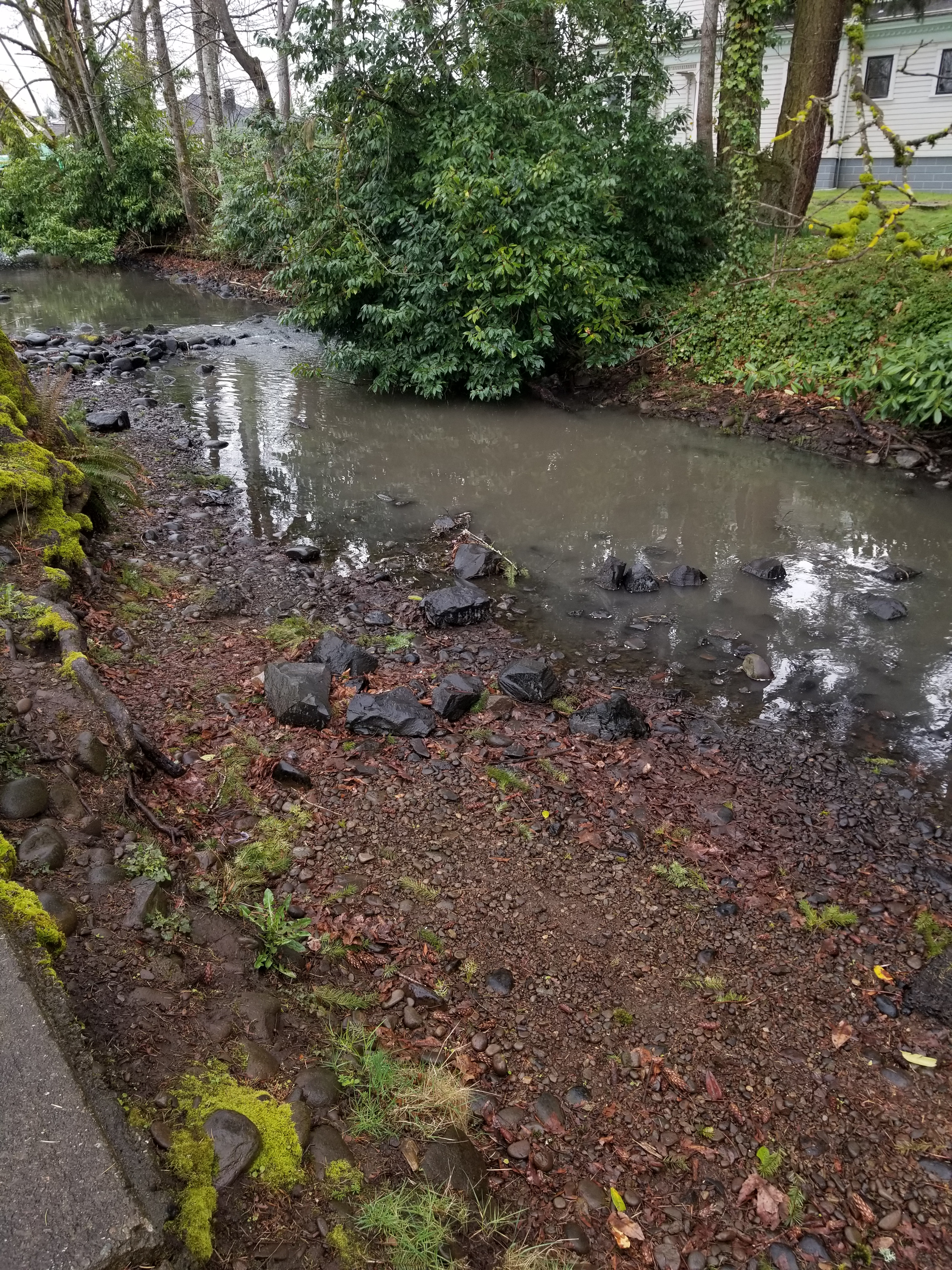
- Salem Ditch at the Stayton Public Library in Stayton, Oregon

- Location of the start of Salem Ditch in Oregon

Location
- Country: United States
- State: Oregon
- County: Marion
- Town: Stayton

Physical characteristics
- Source: North Santiam River
  - coordinates: 44°47′48″N 122°46′36″W
  - elevation: 433 ft (132 m)
- Mouth: Mill Creek
  - location: Marion
  - coordinates: 44°49′36″N 122°49′34″W
- Length: 4.40 mi (7.08 km)

Salem Ditch is an artificial canal in Marion County, Oregon, United States. It drains into Mill Creek.

== History ==
Drury Smith Stayton, an early resident of Sublimity, Oregon, purchased 41 acres of land in 1866 that would eventually come to be known as Stayton. The land was purchased from James Lynch. Unbeknownst to Stayton at the time, an easement existed on Lynch's property, allowing a group from Salem to create a canal to divert water from the North Santiam River to Mill Creek, which was traditionally a seasonal watershed. This allowed settlers of Salem to have access to more water power and permitted year-round operation of the first gristmill and sawmill. The digging of the ditch began in 1855 when settlers cut through a gravel bar along the North Santiam, east of present-day Stayton. The high-flowing ditch was historically used for baptisms.

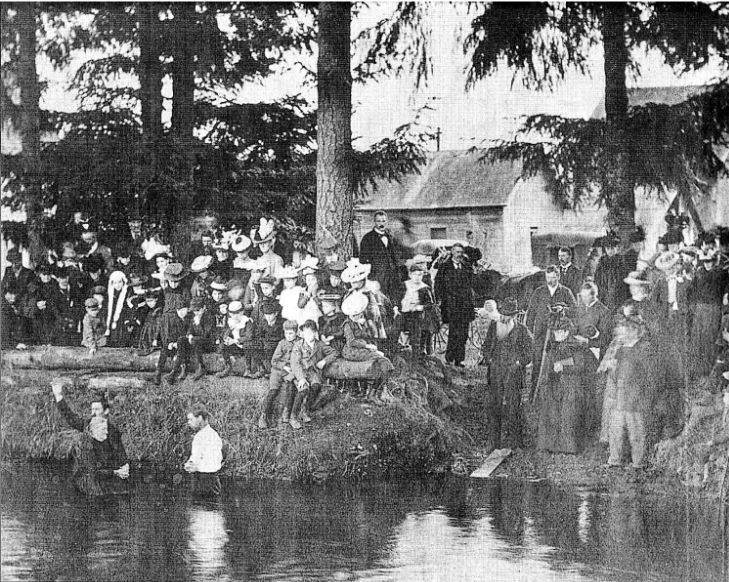
A Christian baptism occurring in the Salem Ditch, c. 1890

The outflow of the Salem Ditch is currently managed by the Santiam Water Control District. Many people exercise their water rights for irrigation, using Salem Ditch water for both domestic and agricultural projects. Before its bankruptcy, NORPAC Foods was allowed to use 30cfs of water from the Salem Ditch for non-contact, once-through cooling water. Spent cooling water was then returned to the ditch, where it would flow out to Mill Creek.

In 2011, as part of the Upper Willamette River Conservation and Recovery Plan for Chinook Salmon and Steelhead, the Oregon Department of Fish and Wildlife recommended that the land use management practices surrounding the Salem Ditch be evaluated to determine upstream passage and habitat access effectiveness for salmonids.
