= List of canals in Oregon =

List of canals in Oregon contains all canals identified by the USGS in the U.S. state of Oregon. The USGS defines a canal as a manmade waterway used by watercraft or for drainage, irrigation, mining, or water power (ditch, lateral).

There are 661 listed as of December 4, 2008.

name	county	elevation	coordinate	USGS Map	GNIS ID
A Canal	Klamath	4,127 ft (1,258 m)	42°10′31″N 121°42′01″W	Altamont	1116746
A Canal	Klamath	4,150 ft (1,260 m)	42°38′49″N 122°00′34″W	Mares Egg Spring	1155306
A Drain	Malheur	2,155 ft (657 m)	44°02′05″N 117°00′39″W	Malheur Butte	1131829
A Line Canal	Umatilla	561 ft (171 m)	45°49′34″N 119°16′43″W	Hermiston	1116747
Ady Canal	Klamath	4,098 ft (1,249 m)	42°01′59″N 121°50′37″W	Worden	1161246
Albany Santiam Canal	Linn	259 ft (79 m)	44°36′04″N 123°01′34″W	Tangent	1116798
Alder Slope Ditch	Wallowa	4,354 ft (1,327 m)	45°23′29″N 117°19′22″W	Enterprise	1137094
Allen Canyon Ditch	Wallowa	5,604 ft (1,708 m)	45°26′35″N 117°28′08″W	Lostine	1137700
Allen Ditch	Malheur	2,959 ft (902 m)	43°43′58″N 118°04′37″W	Juntura	1116878
Allen Ditch	Lake	5,279 ft (1,609 m)	42°25′40″N 120°05′49″W	Drake Peak NE	1131109
Allen Drain	Malheur	2,211 ft (674 m)	43°41′30″N 117°01′51″W	Adrian	1116879
Altnow Ditch	Harney	3,658 ft (1,115 m)	43°52′55″N 118°18′04″W	Cottonwood Reservoir	1154208
Amazon Creek Diversion Channel	Lane	381 ft (116 m)	44°04′32″N 123°13′45″W	Eugene West	1116907
Anawalt Drain	Malheur	4,295 ft (1,309 m)	43°01′58″N 117°19′36″W	Cow Lakes	1116922
Anderson Ditch	Malheur	3,799 ft (1,158 m)	42°42′45″N 117°48′49″W	Anderson Reservoir	1130447
Annex Canal	Malheur	2,106 ft (642 m)	44°13′46″N 116°58′44″W	Weiser South	1116961
Antelope Feeder Canal	Malheur	4,370 ft (1,330 m)	42°58′26″N 117°09′30″W	Antelope Reservoir	1116974
Arnold Canal	Deschutes	3,917 ft (1,194 m)	43°59′29″N 121°21′24″W	Lava Butte	1137298
Arritola Ditch	Malheur	4,747 ft (1,447 m)	42°43′14″N 117°05′54″W	Juniper Point	1130441
Ashcraft Flume	Lake	4,892 ft (1,491 m)	42°05′56″N 120°33′10″W	Fitzwater Point	1137317
Ashland Lateral	Jackson	3,816 ft (1,163 m)	42°09′43″N 122°30′40″W	Emigrant Lake	1137320
Ausmus Canal	Harney	4,104 ft (1,251 m)	43°24′25″N 118°51′06″W	Lawen	1117095
B Canal	Klamath	4,127 ft (1,258 m)	42°10′35″N 121°39′45″W	Altamont	1117115
B Canal	Klamath	4,144 ft (1,263 m)	42°37′14″N 121°59′59″W	Agency Lake	1154981
Bagley Ditch	Lake	4,344 ft (1,324 m)	42°38′25″N 120°30′59″W	Paisley	1137404
Baker Municipal Aqueduct	Baker	4,485 ft (1,367 m)	44°46′03″N 117°53′43″W	Wingville	1164072
Baldock Ditch	Baker	3,422 ft (1,043 m)	44°47′16″N 117°48′43″W	Baker City	1164074
Baldwin Ditch	Crook	2,949 ft (899 m)	44°14′46″N 120°52′24″W	Stearns Butte	1153708
Baldwin Ditch	Lake	4,859 ft (1,481 m)	42°11′35″N 120°28′29″W	Lakeview Airport	1153747
Baltimore Ditch	Josephine	1,496 ft (456 m)	42°13′29″N 123°15′33″W	Williams	1137493
Banks Ditch	Baker	2,638 ft (804 m)	44°34′18″N 117°27′43″W	Durkee	1117223
Basche Ditch	Baker	2,762 ft (842 m)	44°52′52″N 117°38′32″W	Keating NW	1117286
Beers Ditch	Malheur	3,281 ft (1,000 m)	44°21′05″N 117°38′49″W	Cow Valley East	1131896
Bend Feed Canal	Deschutes	3,491 ft (1,064 m)	44°05′31″N 121°19′39″W	Bend	1153111
Big Bend Ditch	Wallowa	4,150 ft (1,260 m)	45°21′57″N 117°11′43″W	Joseph	1137974
Big Creek Ditch	Union	3,635 ft (1,108 m)	44°57′46″N 117°36′44″W	Sawtooth Ridge	1117608
Big Flat Ditch	Baker	3,944 ft (1,202 m)	44°32′18″N 118°10′30″W	Unity Reservoir	1138029
Big Red S Canal	Harney	4,117 ft (1,255 m)	43°26′50″N 118°58′14″W	Redess	1132013
Biggs Ditch	Malheur	2,339 ft (713 m)	43°56′25″N 117°24′59″W	Vines Hill	1129747
Birch Creek Ditch	Malheur	3,770 ft (1,150 m)	44°23′45″N 117°41′49″W	Bridgeport	1131888
Bishop Ditch	Malheur	2,507 ft (764 m)	43°33′00″N 117°05′49″W	Graveyard Point	1130425
Black Willow Siphon	Malheur	2,520 ft (770 m)	43°41′45″N 117°10′49″W	Owyhee Dam	1131226
Blanton Drain	Malheur	2,182 ft (665 m)	44°00′30″N 117°02′44″W	Malheur Butte	1131831
Blodgett Ditch	Josephine	1,680 ft (510 m)	42°15′24″N 123°17′04″W	Murphy	1155194
Blue Mountain Ditch	Grant	2,802 ft (854 m)	44°24′23″N 119°12′10″W	Wolfinger Butte	1152793
Blue Springs Ditch	Klamath	4,176 ft (1,273 m)	42°41′24″N 122°02′52″W	Mares Egg Spring	1134812
Blume Zilkey Ditch	Baker	3,583 ft (1,092 m)	44°57′49″N 118°02′03″W	Rock Creek	1117875
Boston Drain	Malheur	2,303 ft (702 m)	43°55′55″N 117°19′14″W	Vale West	1129748
Bowlus Ditch	Umatilla	1,470 ft (450 m)	45°53′49″N 118°17′54″W	Bowlus Hill	1638731
Bridge Creek Canal	Harney	4,173 ft (1,272 m)	42°51′50″N 118°52′19″W	Page Springs	1118071
Bridgepoint Ditch	Jackson	1,201 ft (366 m)	42°16′39″N 123°13′18″W	Applegate	1135262
Brogan Ditch	Malheur	2,562 ft (781 m)	44°13′03″N 117°28′06″W	Jamieson	1118097
Brooks Ditch	Baker	4,856 ft (1,480 m)	44°56′26″N 117°14′07″W	Jimtown	1138656
Brosman Ditch	Malheur	2,162 ft (659 m)	44°02′21″N 117°01′43″W	Malheur Butte	1118114
Brown Loennig Ditch	Baker	3,586 ft (1,093 m)	44°54′20″N 118°01′23″W	Rock Creek	1118129
Brownell Ditch	Umatilla	331 ft (101 m)	45°55′14″N 119°18′42″W	Umatilla	1118131
Browns Feed Canal	Harney	4,134 ft (1,260 m)	43°10′14″N 118°16′44″W	South Fork Reservoir	1132020
Brownsville Ditch	Linn	371 ft (113 m)	44°23′26″N 122°57′01″W	Brownsville	1118141
Buchanan Ditch	Baker	6,581 ft (2,006 m)	45°02′16″N 117°04′06″W	Deadman Point	1133858
Buena Vista Canal	Harney	4,131 ft (1,259 m)	43°06′13″N 118°53′58″W	Jackass Butte	1118258
Bulger Ditch	Baker	3,953 ft (1,205 m)	44°57′53″N 118°03′02″W	Rock Creek	1118265
Bull Ditch	Harney	4,108 ft (1,252 m)	43°15′15″N 118°51′34″W	Malheur Lake West	1132011
Bullock Drain	Malheur	2,251 ft (686 m)	43°41′58″N 117°04′29″W	Adrian	1118299
Bully Creek Siphon	Malheur	2,415 ft (736 m)	43°59′42″N 117°21′57″W	Vale West	1118302
Busse Canal	Harney	4,121 ft (1,256 m)	43°11′55″N 118°50′55″W	Jackass Butte NE	1118373
Butte Ditch	Harney	4,108 ft (1,252 m)	43°15′15″N 118°53′24″W	The Narrows	1132028
Butte Drain	Malheur	2,195 ft (669 m)	44°00′45″N 117°06′14″W	Malheur Butte	1131832
Byron Ditch	Grant	4,760 ft (1,450 m)	44°09′25″N 118°51′34″W	Big Canyon	1129509
C Canal	Klamath	4,091 ft (1,247 m)	42°07′20″N 121°42′47″W	Lost River	1118430
C Canal	Klamath	4,144 ft (1,263 m)	42°37′09″N 121°59′34″W	Agency Lake	1154982
C-G Cutoff	Klamath	4,091 ft (1,247 m)	42°08′50″N 121°41′20″W	Altamont	1118432
Cables Ditch	Harney	3,438 ft (1,048 m)	43°26′30″N 118°14′04″W	McEwen Butte	1131824
Caledonia Canal	Klamath	4,147 ft (1,264 m)	42°17′11″N 121°55′37″W	Howard Bay	1161299
Camp Creek Ditch	Baker	3,750 ft (1,140 m)	44°29′10″N 118°05′09″W	Hereford	1131458
Carnes Ditch	Union	3,825 ft (1,166 m)	45°01′35″N 118°01′55″W	Tucker Flat	1139382
Cascade Canal	Klamath	5,732 ft (1,747 m)	42°25′04″N 122°14′07″W	Lake of the Woods North	1139413
Catherine Creek Highline Canal	Union	2,779 ft (847 m)	45°14′59″N 117°51′06″W	Union	1130901
Cavin Ditch	Baker	4,265 ft (1,300 m)	44°25′27″N 118°15′04″W	Rail Gulch	1153973
Center Canal	Harney	4,144 ft (1,263 m)	43°02′30″N 118°50′37″W	Diamond Swamp	1118778
Center Canal	Klamath	4,098 ft (1,249 m)	42°03′18″N 121°48′27″W	Worden	1161308
Central Alkali Drain	Canyon (ID)	2,205 ft (672 m)	43°44′13″N 117°01′57″W	Adrian	371956
Central Alkali Drain	Malheur	2,205 ft (672 m)	43°44′15″N 117°02′10″W	Adrian	1118779
Central Canal	Klamath	4,147 ft (1,264 m)	42°38′14″N 122°01′06″W	Mares Egg Spring	1135755
Central Lateral	Hood River	1,545 ft (471 m)	45°35′54″N 121°32′17″W	Parkdale	1139544
Central Oregon Canal	Deschutes	3,366 ft (1,026 m)	44°04′04″N 121°02′02″W	Alfalfa	1139545
Chambeam Ditch	Baker	2,717 ft (828 m)	44°34′54″N 117°30′32″W	Lost Basin	1116727
Chamberlin Ditch	Wallowa	2,976 ft (907 m)	45°34′12″N 117°34′06″W	Wallowa	1116572
Chance Lateral	Malheur	2,382 ft (726 m)	43°42′32″N 117°01′38″W	Adrian	1118812
China Creek Ditch	Baker	4,101 ft (1,250 m)	44°33′16″N 118°10′34″W	Unity Reservoir	1139671
China Ditch	Gilliam	292 ft (89 m)	45°43′11″N 120°12′09″W	Arlington	1118906
China Ditch	Jackson	1,850 ft (560 m)	42°10′50″N 123°01′10″W	Ruch	1139674
Clarks Creek Ditch	Baker	3,635 ft (1,108 m)	44°29′15″N 117°48′56″W	Wendt Butte	1118977
Clear Creek Ditch	Wasco	3,228 ft (984 m)	45°08′17″N 121°35′49″W	Post Point	1139795
Clear Water Ditch	Wallowa	3,094 ft (943 m)	45°32′44″N 117°31′13″W	Wallowa	1139809
Clearwater Canal Number 2	Douglas	3,225 ft (983 m)	43°14′54″N 122°22′29″W	Garwood Butte	1134857
Cleary Ditch	Baker	3,566 ft (1,087 m)	44°30′03″N 117°57′18″W	Brannan Gulch	1119008
Cleary Ditch	Baker	5,289 ft (1,612 m)	44°36′41″N 118°00′04″W	Hereford	1131457
Clement Ditch	Baker	3,556 ft (1,084 m)	44°29′53″N 117°51′05″W	Wendt Butte	1119012
Cleveland Ditch	Harney	4,108 ft (1,252 m)	43°59′40″N 118°41′30″W	Van	1160907
Cloverdale Ditch	Deschutes	3,104 ft (946 m)	44°18′00″N 121°27′55″W	Henkle Butte	1139857
Coates Drain	Malheur	2,402 ft (732 m)	43°37′11″N 117°02′05″W	Graveyard Point	1119061
Coker Butte Lateral	Jackson	1,283 ft (391 m)	42°23′54″N 122°52′50″W	Sams Valley	1134760
Cole Ditch	Malheur	2,730 ft (830 m)	44°15′43″N 117°32′43″W	Becker Creek	1119130
Colt Ware Ditch	Baker	3,691 ft (1,125 m)	44°29′36″N 118°07′41″W	Unity	1153975
Columbia Southern Canal	Deschutes	3,481 ft (1,061 m)	44°08′19″N 121°23′21″W	Tumalo Dam	1140015
Conn Ditch	Lake	4,482 ft (1,366 m)	42°41′50″N 120°34′14″W	Paisley	1153796
Consolidated Ditch	Wallowa	4,485 ft (1,367 m)	45°20′32″N 117°16′58″W	Chief Joseph Mountain	1140048
Cook Ditch	Baker	3,697 ft (1,127 m)	44°30′00″N 118°07′20″W	Beaverdam Creek	1153974
Corbell Ditch	Klamath	4,265 ft (1,300 m)	42°34′34″N 121°41′34″W	S'Ocholis Canyon	1154826
Cornstock Ditch	Jackson	1,568 ft (478 m)	42°09′34″N 123°02′59″W	Ruch	1155053
Corral Ditch	Baker	3,405 ft (1,038 m)	44°47′46″N 117°48′24″W	Baker City	1164082
Correll Ditch	Baker	3,465 ft (1,056 m)	44°46′30″N 117°51′22″W	Baker City	1164083
Cory Ditch	Harney	4,101 ft (1,250 m)	43°25′00″N 118°30′39″W	Crane	1132056
Coughanour Ditch	Union	3,632 ft (1,107 m)	45°01′39″N 118°00′46″W	Tucker Flat	1140251
Courtney Ditch	Umatilla	574 ft (175 m)	45°46′36″N 119°15′50″W	Hermiston	1119401
Coye Ditch	Wallowa	4,272 ft (1,302 m)	45°20′34″N 117°14′17″W	Joseph	1140304
Coyote Drain	Malheur	2,146 ft (654 m)	44°09′50″N 116°55′44″W	Weiser South	1129769
Coyote Gulch Siphon	Malheur	2,461 ft (750 m)	43°38′00″N 117°05′24″W	Adrian	1131223
Cram Ditch	Jefferson	1,844 ft (562 m)	44°47′58″N 120°55′53″W	Willowdale	1119504
Cranston Ditch	Baker	2,700 ft (820 m)	44°51′59″N 117°35′00″W	Keating	1158185
Crater Canal	Jackson	1,348 ft (411 m)	42°28′59″N 122°47′49″W	Eagle Point	1135368
Crater Creek Ditch	Deschutes	6,850 ft (2,090 m)	44°02′50″N 121°40′25″W	Broken Top	1140395
Cross Country Ditch	Wallowa	3,323 ft (1,013 m)	45°29′39″N 117°25′09″W	Lostine	1140478
Crump Ditch	Lake	4,590 ft (1,400 m)	42°11′00″N 119°53′29″W	Adel	1131216
Crutcher Ditch	Malheur	3,796 ft (1,157 m)	42°43′00″N 117°48′56″W	Anderson Reservoir	1130446
Cummings Ditch	Grant	2,477 ft (755 m)	44°26′55″N 119°32′04″W	Dayville	1153770
Curop Ditch	Baker	3,970 ft (1,210 m)	44°28′35″N 118°12′19″W	Unity	1153981
Curtis Ditch	Lake	4,308 ft (1,313 m)	42°30′45″N 120°18′24″W	Coglan Buttes SE	1131004
D Canal	Klamath	4,075 ft (1,242 m)	42°02′00″N 121°26′51″W	Malin	1119652
Danforth Ditch	Harney	4,462 ft (1,360 m)	43°39′35″N 118°54′19″W	Devine Ridge South	1154187
Danley Creek Canal	Jackson	4,701 ft (1,433 m)	42°17′54″N 122°21′24″W	Brown Mountain	1116642
Day Drainage Ditch	Lincoln	23 ft (7.0 m)	44°26′59″N 124°02′12″W	Waldport	1135272
Dead Ox Canal	Malheur	2,123 ft (647 m)	44°07′19″N 116°55′45″W	Payette	1119746
Dee Flat Ditch	Hood River	1,322 ft (403 m)	45°33′37″N 121°40′08″W	Dee	1140781
Diamond Canal	Harney	4,153 ft (1,266 m)	43°02′14″N 118°44′25″W	Diamond	1119921
Diamond Drain	Harney	4,144 ft (1,263 m)	43°03′58″N 118°47′54″W	Diamond Swamp	1119923
Dillon Ditch	Umatilla	561 ft (171 m)	45°47′16″N 119°16′15″W	Hermiston	1119941
Dobbin Ditch	Union	2,785 ft (849 m)	45°21′29″N 118°04′08″W	La Grande	1164089
Domby Ditch	Malheur	2,110 ft (640 m)	44°16′00″N 117°06′19″W	Porters Flat	1158635
Dork Canal	Malheur	2,172 ft (662 m)	44°01′00″N 117°02′17″W	Malheur Butte	1158213
Dorothy Ditch	Umatilla	1,371 ft (418 m)	45°53′44″N 118°18′24″W	Bowlus Hill	1638732
Drescher Ditch	Marion	151 ft (46 m)	45°07′04″N 122°45′29″W	Silverton	1130466
Drewsey Reclamation Company Ditch	Harney	3,576 ft (1,090 m)	43°49′29″N 118°26′07″W	Drewsey	1120082
Dry Gulch Ditch	Baker	2,779 ft (847 m)	44°48′49″N 117°12′41″W	Richland	1141337
Dufur Ditch	Wasco	1,398 ft (426 m)	45°26′32″N 121°09′05″W	Dufur West	1130114
Duncan Ditch	Baker	2,762 ft (842 m)	44°53′48″N 117°39′44″W	Keating NW	1120209
Duncan Ditch	Malheur	3,819 ft (1,164 m)	44°18′50″N 117°57′14″W	Ironside	1131939
E Canal	Klamath	4,121 ft (1,256 m)	42°11′44″N 121°35′58″W	Dairy	1120252
Eagle Point Irrigation Canal	Jackson	2,274 ft (693 m)	42°33′42″N 122°39′28″W	Obenchain Mountain	1141486
East Canal	Klamath	4,163 ft (1,269 m)	42°12′00″N 121°19′39″W	Lorella	1133076
East Canal	Lake	4,797 ft (1,462 m)	42°06′40″N 120°31′32″W	Fitzwater Point	1141513
East Fork Main Canal	Hood River	1,657 ft (505 m)	45°33′32″N 121°33′07″W	Parkdale	1141581
East Grain Camp Canal	Harney	4,147 ft (1,264 m)	43°01′51″N 118°49′40″W	Diamond Swamp	1120334
East Lateral	Jackson	2,051 ft (625 m)	42°15′18″N 122°44′33″W	Rio Canyon	1141625
East Lateral	Klamath	4,183 ft (1,275 m)	42°06′25″N 121°12′31″W	Langell Valley	1158222
East Malone Lateral	Klamath	4,160 ft (1,270 m)	42°01′07″N 121°13′08″W	Langell Valley	1120342
East Side Canal	Harney	4,209 ft (1,283 m)	42°49′29″N 118°51′43″W	Page Springs	1116729
East Side Ditch	Malheur	2,621 ft (799 m)	44°15′12″N 117°30′23″W	Becker Creek	1133928
Easterday Ditch	Malheur	4,462 ft (1,360 m)	43°30′45″N 118°00′19″W	Mosquito Mountain	1129744
Echave Ditch	Malheur	4,895 ft (1,492 m)	42°13′35″N 117°53′54″W	Oregon Canyon Ranch	1134242
Eddington Ditch	Grant	2,690 ft (820 m)	44°25′40″N 119°15′19″W	Shop Gulch	1153717
Elder Ditch	Klamath	4,344 ft (1,324 m)	42°27′10″N 121°06′44″W	Bly	1155311
Eldorado Ditch	Baker	5,082 ft (1,549 m)	44°23′03″N 118°20′55″W	Rail Gulch	1141723
Elliot Ditch	Baker	3,422 ft (1,043 m)	44°29′44″N 117°47′00″W	Wendt Butte	1120483
Ellis Ditch	Union	3,392 ft (1,034 m)	44°59′59″N 117°59′40″W	Haines	1120486
Elmer Ditch	Union	3,583 ft (1,092 m)	45°13′17″N 117°45′44″W	Union	1158682
Elms Ditch	Baker	4,124 ft (1,257 m)	44°25′53″N 118°13′42″W	Unity	1141841
Emele Ditch	Baker	2,789 ft (850 m)	44°54′37″N 117°39′05″W	Keating NW	1120491
Enterprise Ditch	Grant	2,894 ft (882 m)	44°24′52″N 119°04′13″W	Mount Vernon	1152796
Erickson Ditch	Wheeler	4,314 ft (1,315 m)	44°27′00″N 119°47′19″W	Antone	1158618
Erwin Ditch	Baker	2,756 ft (840 m)	44°54′14″N 117°39′04″W	Keating NW	1158225
Estes Ditch	Baker	3,363 ft (1,025 m)	44°50′13″N 117°51′37″W	Baker City	1164091
Eugene Water & Electric Board Canal	Lane	735 ft (224 m)	44°06′45″N 122°39′16″W	Leaburg	1120531
Evans Creek Lateral	Jackson	1,132 ft (345 m)	42°25′46″N 123°11′34″W	Rogue River	1135238
Ewing Ditch	Morrow	584 ft (178 m)	45°38′44″N 119°57′19″W	Dalreed Butte	1129824
F Canal	Klamath	4,114 ft (1,254 m)	42°07′50″N 121°31′16″W	Dairy	1120549
F-1 Lateral	Klamath	4,859 ft (1,481 m)	42°09′00″N 121°34′49″W	Dairy	1132677
Farmers Ditch	Baker	4,111 ft (1,253 m)	44°41′05″N 118°06′19″W	Phillips Lake	1120635
Farmers Ditch	Malheur	2,342 ft (714 m)	43°56′50″N 117°21′15″W	Vale West	1120636
Farmers Ditch	Hood River	850 ft (260 m)	45°39′18″N 121°34′18″W	Hood River	1142024
Farmers Ditch	Wallowa	4,213 ft (1,284 m)	45°21′32″N 117°10′04″W	Joseph	1142025
Feed Canal	Umatilla	636 ft (194 m)	45°49′30″N 119°16′12″W	Hermiston	1120657
Feed Canal	Harney	4,199 ft (1,280 m)	43°08′00″N 118°37′59″W	Barton Lake	1129720
Fish Creek Canal	Douglas	3,035 ft (925 m)	43°14′29″N 122°27′01″W	Fish Creek Desert	1134856
Fister Ditch	Harney	3,848 ft (1,173 m)	43°20′45″N 118°25′39″W	Circle Bar	1131825
Fitzgerald Ditches	Lake	5,321 ft (1,622 m)	42°29′10″N 120°04′29″W	Drake Peak NE	1131107
Five and Seventenths Canal	Owyhee (ID)	2,477 ft (755 m)	43°38′19″N 117°02′34″W	Adrian	372712
Five and Seventenths Canal	Malheur	2,526 ft (770 m)	43°37′19″N 117°04′03″W	Graveyard Point	1120798
Foothill Ditch	Baker	2,858 ft (871 m)	44°53′10″N 117°08′54″W	Jimtown	1153068
Ford Ingram Ditch	Baker	5,403 ft (1,647 m)	44°53′40″N 118°05′47″W	Rock Creek	1120877
Fort Creek Ditch	Klamath	4,147 ft (1,264 m)	42°38′39″N 121°57′14″W	Fort Klamath	1154978
Fourmile Canal	Klamath	4,147 ft (1,264 m)	42°36′29″N 122°03′18″W	Crystal Spring	1167675
Frazier Creek Ditch	Benton	213 ft (65 m)	44°37′16″N 123°13′11″W	Riverside	1120962
Frederick Lateral	Jackson	2,146 ft (654 m)	42°13′22″N 122°46′57″W	Talent	1142435
Frog Creek Ditch	Wasco	3,422 ft (1,043 m)	45°10′06″N 121°38′29″W	Wapinitia Pass	1121006
Furnish Ditch	Umatilla	682 ft (208 m)	45°46′37″N 119°10′54″W	Stanfield	1158253
G Canal	Klamath	4,091 ft (1,247 m)	42°05′54″N 121°40′05″W	Lost River	1121027
G-Three Canal	Klamath	4,085 ft (1,245 m)	42°02′20″N 121°33′26″W	Merrill	1121029
Gardner Mill Race Ditch	Baker	3,573 ft (1,089 m)	44°59′39″N 118°03′04″W	Rock Creek	1121061
Gekeler Ditch	Union	2,717 ft (828 m)	45°19′13″N 118°01′33″W	La Grande	1164094
Gellerman Canal	Malheur	2,277 ft (694 m)	44°00′57″N 117°15′23″W	Willowcreek	1166655
Gerwick Ditch	Klamath	4,518 ft (1,377 m)	42°45′49″N 121°48′14″W	Fuego	1154990
Gibson Drain	Malheur	2,244 ft (684 m)	43°41′23″N 117°04′53″W	Adrian	1121122
Gill Ditch	Crook	4,554 ft (1,388 m)	44°22′04″N 120°11′26″W	Williams Prairie	1157544
Glacier Ditch	Hood River	2,674 ft (815 m)	45°27′59″N 121°35′36″W	Dog River	1153202
Gold Hill Irrigation District Canal	Jackson	1,066 ft (325 m)	42°25′34″N 123°06′19″W	Gold Hill	1135237
Golden Gate Canal	Malheur	2,329 ft (710 m)	43°42′51″N 117°01′52″W	Adrian	1121220
Goulden Canal	Harney	4,108 ft (1,252 m)	43°15′33″N 119°14′54″W	Northwest Harney Lake	1133761
Grande Ronde Ditch	Union	2,717 ft (828 m)	45°18′14″N 118°01′40″W	La Grande	1164096
Granger Ditch	Wallowa	3,963 ft (1,208 m)	45°23′13″N 117°14′11″W	Joseph NW	1142910
Gray Lateral	Lake	4,770 ft (1,450 m)	42°10′42″N 120°26′04″W	Lakeview Airport	1153749
Greener Ditch	Baker	6,345 ft (1,934 m)	45°02′17″N 117°03′40″W	Deadman Point	1133854
Grout Ditch	Union	3,461 ft (1,055 m)	45°08′27″N 117°58′46″W	Craig Mountain	1130906
H V I Company Ditch	Harney	4,144 ft (1,263 m)	43°37′40″N 118°44′56″W	Buchanan	1154186
Hall Ditch	Wheeler	3,428 ft (1,045 m)	44°32′19″N 120°08′39″W	Mitchell	1157460
Halliday Drain	Malheur	2,182 ft (665 m)	44°00′55″N 117°01′14″W	Malheur Butte	1131830
Hammel Lateral	Jackson	1,614 ft (492 m)	42°32′59″N 122°46′23″W	Shady Cove	1121541
Hanley North Canal	Jackson	2,116 ft (645 m)	42°25′26″N 122°33′27″W	Lakecreek	1116588
Hanley South Canal	Jackson	2,090 ft (640 m)	42°24′31″N 122°34′11″W	Lakecreek	1116589
Happy Valley Ditch	Malheur	3,383 ft (1,031 m)	42°50′32″N 117°37′54″W	Rome	1143295
Harper Southside Canal	Malheur	2,507 ft (764 m)	43°51′35″N 117°35′44″W	Harper	1131817
Hawley Ditch	Baker	4,245 ft (1,294 m)	44°43′01″N 118°09′00″W	Sumpter	1143386
Hendrix Siphon	Malheur	2,444 ft (745 m)	44°00′48″N 117°23′49″W	Hope Butte	1121756
Hereford Ditch	Baker	3,665 ft (1,117 m)	44°30′12″N 118°03′34″W	Beaverdam Creek	1131456
Hermiston Ditch	Umatilla	443 ft (135 m)	45°51′01″N 119°16′35″W	Hermiston	1121772
High Line Canal	Klamath	4,117 ft (1,255 m)	42°02′14″N 121°23′47″W	Malin	1121804
High Line Canal	Umatilla	620 ft (190 m)	45°46′33″N 119°22′20″W	Hermiston	1121805
High Line Ditch	Klamath	4,219 ft (1,286 m)	42°07′49″N 121°19′55″W	Lorella	1121806
High Line Ditch	Malheur	2,861 ft (872 m)	44°13′27″N 117°32′01″W	Brogan	1121807
High Line Ditch	Lake	4,833 ft (1,473 m)	42°25′40″N 120°15′19″W	Valley Falls	1131007
High Line Ditch	Baker	3,747 ft (1,142 m)	44°30′00″N 118°08′22″W	Unity Reservoir	1153983
Highberger Ditch	Marion	364 ft (111 m)	44°50′24″N 122°51′59″W	Stayton	1130397
Highland Ditch	Wasco	2,028 ft (618 m)	45°15′11″N 121°19′13″W	Friend	1143587
Highline Canal	Josephine	1,030 ft (310 m)	42°25′27″N 123°16′58″W	Grants Pass	1143590
Highline Ditch	Wasco	1,161 ft (354 m)	45°15′17″N 121°08′46″W	Postage Stamp Butte	1121825
Highline Ditch	Harney	4,213 ft (1,284 m)	43°07′20″N 118°40′39″W	Diamond	1129719
Highline Lateral	Hood River	1,093 ft (333 m)	45°37′06″N 121°33′45″W	Parkdale	1136971
Hobbs Ditch	Klamath	4,511 ft (1,375 m)	42°45′44″N 121°49′44″W	Fuego	1154989
Hoffman Ditch	Crook	2,976 ft (907 m)	44°10′29″N 120°50′44″W	Stearns Butte	1130935
Holloway Ditch	Harney	4,770 ft (1,450 m)	42°05′55″N 118°26′57″W	Windy Point	1157740
Holly Drain	Malheur	2,244 ft (684 m)	43°42′09″N 117°04′02″W	Adrian	1121922
Hope Ditch	Malheur	2,244 ft (684 m)	44°00′25″N 117°13′57″W	Henry Gulch	1133398
Hope Drain	Malheur	2,234 ft (681 m)	43°59′58″N 117°12′22″W	Vale East	1121975
Hopkins Canal	Jackson	1,332 ft (406 m)	42°20′49″N 122°54′09″W	Medford West	1121978
Hotchkiss Ditch	Lake	4,823 ft (1,470 m)	42°17′00″N 120°24′09″W	Big Baldy	1158693
Howard Prairie Canal	Jackson	4,521 ft (1,378 m)	42°09′14″N 122°22′29″W	Little Chinquapin Mountain	1160748
Howell Ditch	Baker	2,254 ft (687 m)	44°46′15″N 117°11′34″W	Richland	1158582
Hubble Ditch	Malheur	3,471 ft (1,058 m)	42°51′21″N 117°43′35″W	Rome	1122095
Hudson Bay Canal	Umatilla	820 ft (250 m)	45°58′22″N 118°26′40″W	Milton-Freewater	1122102
Huff Ditch	Baker	5,361 ft (1,634 m)	45°01′00″N 117°01′11″W	Deadman Point	1133859
Hunt Ditch	Umatilla	630 ft (190 m)	45°44′26″N 119°16′37″W	Service Buttes	1122141
Hunter Ditch	Malheur	4,229 ft (1,289 m)	44°01′31″N 118°06′57″W	Hunter Mountain	1637912
Hurricane Ditch	Wallowa	4,144 ft (1,263 m)	45°21′50″N 117°16′36″W	Chief Joseph Mountain	1143960
Hutchinson Ditch	Baker	3,691 ft (1,125 m)	44°59′08″N 118°02′56″W	Rock Creek	1122173
I Canal	Umatilla	499 ft (152 m)	45°49′59″N 119°18′59″W	Hermiston	1129829
I N Young Ditch	Baker	2,290 ft (700 m)	44°47′20″N 117°11′04″W	Richland	1158580
Imbler Drain	Malheur	2,224 ft (678 m)	43°43′56″N 117°01′50″W	Adrian	1122190
Independence Creek Ditch	Baker	3,914 ft (1,193 m)	44°29′15″N 117°57′49″W	Devils Heel	1131954
Island Ditch	Wallowa	3,875 ft (1,181 m)	45°23′55″N 117°15′32″W	Enterprise	1144133
J Canal	Klamath	4,045 ft (1,233 m)	42°00′15″N 121°27′21″W	Malin	1122308
J-1 Canal	Klamath	4,052 ft (1,235 m)	42°00′13″N 121°32′31″W	Merrill	1122314
J-H Canal	Malheur	2,323 ft (708 m)	43°54′15″N 117°18′08″W	Vale West	1122313
Jacobsen Ditch	Baker	3,268 ft (996 m)	44°58′12″N 117°52′49″W	Haines	1122369
Jefferson Ditch	Marion	256 ft (78 m)	44°42′38″N 122°59′21″W	Crabtree	1156648
Jerome Prairie Lateral	Josephine	1,050 ft (320 m)	42°23′16″N 123°24′24″W	Wilderville	1135423
Johnson Ditch	Harney	3,842 ft (1,171 m)	43°54′25″N 118°34′24″W	Moffit Table	1163977
Jones Canal	Lake	4,311 ft (1,314 m)	42°39′51″N 120°30′40″W	Paisley	1144373
Jones Ditch	Marion	157 ft (48 m)	45°03′09″N 122°55′27″W	Gervais	1122511
Jonesboro Canal	Malheur	2,821 ft (860 m)	43°47′45″N 117°56′04″W	Jonesboro	1131800
Jordan Drain	Malheur	2,195 ft (669 m)	43°59′47″N 117°05′56″W	Cairo	1122530
Juntura Investment Company Canal	Malheur	3,081 ft (939 m)	43°45′45″N 118°07′04″W	Stemler Ridge	1131763
Kanehinke Ditch	Malheur	3,881 ft (1,183 m)	42°40′51″N 117°53′41″W	Flat Top Mountain	1130449
Kelly Lateral	Wasco	2,064 ft (629 m)	45°07′23″N 121°15′01″W	Maupin SW	1153132
Kelsey Wilson Ditch	Baker	3,383 ft (1,031 m)	44°59′00″N 117°56′10″W	Haines	1122679
Kennedy Ditch	Baker	3,169 ft (966 m)	44°59′15″N 117°38′49″W	Keating NW	1122683
Keno Canal	Klamath	4,127 ft (1,258 m)	42°13′37″N 121°47′52″W	Klamath Falls	1135524
Kerby Ditch	Josephine	1,276 ft (389 m)	42°10′33″N 123°39′31″W	Cave Junction	1144565
King Drain	Malheur	2,218 ft (676 m)	43°59′08″N 117°09′25″W	Vale East	1122749
Kingman Drain	Malheur	2,215 ft (675 m)	43°45′58″N 117°03′33″W	Owyhee	1122759
Kingman Lateral	Malheur	2,526 ft (770 m)	43°43′51″N 117°08′42″W	Owyhee Dam	1122760
Kittredge Canal	Klamath	4,524 ft (1,379 m)	42°56′59″N 121°36′59″W	Wildhorse Ridge	1155000
Klamath Strait	Klamath	4,098 ft (1,249 m)	42°04′43″N 121°49′49″W	Worden	1161407
Klamath Strait Drain	Klamath	4,091 ft (1,247 m)	42°01′57″N 121°47′25″W	Worden	226642
Krumbo Canal	Harney	4,160 ft (1,270 m)	42°58′46″N 118°51′03″W	Krumbo Reservoir	1122846
Kueny Ditch	Harney	4,098 ft (1,249 m)	42°27′01″N 118°36′40″W	Andrews	1122856
L Canal	Umatilla	492 ft (150 m)	45°51′49″N 119°12′34″W	Stanfield	1129796
La Grande Aqueduct	Union	4,383 ft (1,336 m)	45°13′44″N 118°10′09″W	La Grande Reservoir	1130988
Lacomb Irrigation Canal	Linn	915 ft (279 m)	44°35′29″N 122°39′34″W	Lacomb	1122882
Ladd Creek Pickup Ditch	Union	2,697 ft (822 m)	45°15′37″N 117°57′56″W	Conley	1122886
Lake Labish Ditch	Marion	138 ft (42 m)	45°01′57″N 122°55′54″W	Gervais	1157945
Lateral 197	Malheur	2,395 ft (730 m)	43°59′12″N 117°21′40″W	Vale West	1166670
Lateral B	Deschutes	3,081 ft (939 m)	44°14′18″N 121°13′18″W	Forked Horn Butte	1144853
Lateral C	Deschutes	3,005 ft (916 m)	44°16′26″N 121°11′59″W	Redmond	1122971
Lateral E	Deschutes	3,008 ft (917 m)	44°17′24″N 121°09′24″W	Redmond	1129581
Lateral F	Deschutes	2,802 ft (854 m)	44°20′20″N 121°11′32″W	Redmond	1122972
Lateral H	Deschutes	2,861 ft (872 m)	44°21′46″N 121°10′30″W	Redmond	1144854
Lateral J	Deschutes	2,746 ft (837 m)	44°20′59″N 121°14′59″W	Redmond	1129579
Laycock Long Ditch	Grant	3,005 ft (916 m)	44°25′24″N 119°01′32″W	Mount Vernon	1152795
Lebanon Santiam Canal	Linn	364 ft (111 m)	44°30′45″N 122°52′42″W	Lebanon	1123016
Lemolo Canal Number 1	Douglas	4,140 ft (1,260 m)	43°20′19″N 122°12′49″W	Lemolo Lake	1134866
Lemolo Number 2 Canal	Douglas	3,278 ft (999 m)	43°19′24″N 122°20′24″W	Potter Mountain	1155264
Lemons Ditch	Grant	2,825 ft (861 m)	44°24′55″N 119°08′04″W	Wolfinger Butte	1153716
Lenz Lateral	Umatilla	673 ft (205 m)	45°49′52″N 119°08′15″W	Stanfield	1123044
Lewis Ditch	Wheeler	3,642 ft (1,110 m)	44°31′14″N 120°19′14″W	Lawson Mountain	1153832
Lillard Ditch	Baker	3,373 ft (1,028 m)	44°55′20″N 117°51′25″W	Magpie Peak	1145006
Little Butte Creek Siphon	Jackson	1,378 ft (420 m)	42°28′36″N 122°44′59″W	Brownsboro	1123145
Little Valley Lateral	Malheur	2,589 ft (789 m)	43°52′37″N 117°29′07″W	Vines Hill	1123305
Littlefield Ditch	Baker	4,311 ft (1,314 m)	44°41′54″N 117°54′19″W	Blue Canyon	1123322
Locket Gulch Siphon	Malheur	2,497 ft (761 m)	43°53′13″N 117°05′49″W	Cairo	1123334
Lone Pine Ditch	Union	3,724 ft (1,135 m)	45°01′35″N 118°04′18″W	Tucker Flat	1145356
Lorella Drain	Klamath	4,150 ft (1,260 m)	42°08′15″N 121°15′30″W	Lorella	1157069
Lorella Lateral	Klamath	4,160 ft (1,270 m)	42°07′50″N 121°15′46″W	Lorella	1157070
Lost Boulder Ditch	Wasco	3,133 ft (955 m)	45°08′57″N 121°28′35″W	Rock Creek Reservoir	1145494
Lousignont Canal	Washington	174 ft (53 m)	45°34′22″N 123°08′29″W	Gales Creek	1157972
Love Ditch	Baker	3,445 ft (1,050 m)	44°45′47″N 117°30′17″W	Keating	1158335
Love Loney Ditch	Umatilla	538 ft (164 m)	45°59′19″N 118°34′54″W	Waterman	1129686
Low Line Canal	Klamath	4,094 ft (1,248 m)	42°01′22″N 121°22′51″W	Malin	1135809
Low Line Ditch	Klamath	4,157 ft (1,267 m)	42°09′24″N 121°20′40″W	Lorella	1123544
Low Line Ditch	Malheur	2,713 ft (827 m)	44°14′03″N 117°31′27″W	Brogan	1158093
Low Line Ditch	Hood River	1,391 ft (424 m)	45°36′38″N 121°38′15″W	Dee	1158336
Lower Alder Slope Ditch	Wallowa	3,927 ft (1,197 m)	45°24′13″N 117°18′41″W	Enterprise	1123551
Lower Ditch	Malheur	2,188 ft (667 m)	44°07′06″N 116°56′54″W	Payette	1123561
Lower East Lateral	Jackson	1,706 ft (520 m)	42°14′13″N 122°44′59″W	Ashland	1145616
Lower Fisher Long Ditch	Baker	3,615 ft (1,102 m)	44°55′20″N 118°01′27″W	Rock Creek	1123563
Lower Marsh Canal	Lake	4,288 ft (1,307 m)	42°34′05″N 120°22′59″W	Tucker Hill	1153755
Lower Pump Canal	Malheur	2,241 ft (683 m)	43°58′47″N 117°09′18″W	Vale East	1123584
Lower Sevenmile Ditch	Klamath	4,157 ft (1,267 m)	42°40′16″N 122°03′24″W	Mares Egg Spring	1134811
Lower Valley Ditch	Wallowa	2,864 ft (873 m)	45°36′33″N 117°33′01″W	Wallowa	1145643
Luce Ditch	Grant	3,025 ft (922 m)	44°25′16″N 118°59′31″W	John Day	1157835
Luce Ditch	Lake	4,642 ft (1,415 m)	42°47′30″N 120°06′34″W	Coleman Hills	1158716
Lynns Ditch	Malheur	4,514 ft (1,376 m)	44°25′15″N 117°50′25″W	Wendt Butte	1123637
Lynns Ditch	Malheur	3,993 ft (1,217 m)	44°25′18″N 117°44′14″W	Bridgeport	1123638
M Canal	Umatilla	486 ft (148 m)	45°52′39″N 119°15′42″W	Umatilla	1123651
Main Canal	Marion	371 ft (113 m)	44°47′37″N 122°52′55″W	Turner	1166675
Malheur Siphon	Malheur	2,257 ft (688 m)	43°58′52″N 117°03′27″W	Cairo	1123713
Mallett Drain	Malheur	2,195 ft (669 m)	43°59′40″N 117°06′58″W	Cairo	1123717
Mansfield Ditch	Baker	3,504 ft (1,068 m)	44°56′56″N 118°01′15″W	Rock Creek	1123735
Marion Ditch	Marion	348 ft (106 m)	44°45′45″N 122°53′51″W	Turner	1123760
Marquam Dry Lake Canal	Multnomah	13 ft (4.0 m)	45°39′54″N 122°48′14″W	Sauvie Island	1123781
Maxwell Canal	Umatilla	525 ft (160 m)	45°49′32″N 119°17′33″W	Hermiston	1123855
Maxwell Ditch	Baker	3,501 ft (1,067 m)	44°55′49″N 118°00′30″W	Rock Creek	1123856
Maxwell Ditch	Deschutes	3,402 ft (1,037 m)	44°14′39″N 121°30′51″W	Three Creek Butte	1153109
May Park Ditch	Union	2,756 ft (840 m)	45°20′25″N 118°03′47″W	La Grande	1164112
Mayfield Ditch	Klamath	4,334 ft (1,321 m)	43°32′09″N 121°38′49″W	Cryder Butte	1153040
McAlister Ditch	Union	2,703 ft (824 m)	45°19′09″N 117°59′04″W	Conley	1164113
McBride Ditch	Malheur	2,162 ft (659 m)	44°16′18″N 117°13′04″W	Olds Ferry	1130921
McCord Ditch	Baker	3,425 ft (1,044 m)	44°47′03″N 117°51′59″W	Baker City	1164114
McDonald Ditch	Jackson	4,091 ft (1,247 m)	42°06′39″N 122°48′44″W	Siskiyou Peak	1145967
McEwen Valley Ditch	Baker	4,281 ft (1,305 m)	44°41′17″N 118°09′07″W	Sumpter	1145976
McKenzie Ditch	Lane	436 ft (133 m)	44°04′24″N 123°02′34″W	Eugene East	1639025
McKenzie-Greeley Ditch	Malheur	3,763 ft (1,147 m)	43°20′17″N 117°05′09″W	Rockville	1130438
McMullen Ditch	Baker	2,520 ft (770 m)	44°51′05″N 117°03′54″W	Posy Valley	1129555
McPherson Ditch	Baker	3,455 ft (1,053 m)	44°29′45″N 117°49′41″W	Wendt Butte	1124018
Medford Aqueduct	Jackson	2,513 ft (766 m)	42°32′56″N 122°36′03″W	Butte Falls	1146071
Medford Irrigation District Canal	Jackson	1,640 ft (500 m)	42°26′59″N 122°43′45″W	Brownsboro	1146072
Melhase Ditch	Klamath	4,176 ft (1,273 m)	42°41′29″N 122°00′19″W	Mares Egg Spring	1155324
Middle Ditch	Malheur	2,188 ft (667 m)	44°09′50″N 116°57′09″W	Weiser South	1124097
Mill Creek Canal	Wasco	2,680 ft (820 m)	44°53′33″N 121°29′26″W	Hehe Butte	1124167
Mill Creek Lateral	Wasco	2,838 ft (865 m)	44°52′21″N 121°30′17″W	Sawmill Butte	1124170
Mill Ditch	Malheur	2,234 ft (681 m)	43°59′36″N 117°12′33″W	Vale East	1124171
Mill Ditch	Baker	3,573 ft (1,089 m)	44°29′22″N 117°51′48″W	Wendt Butte	1124172
Miller Ditch	Harney	3,622 ft (1,104 m)	43°51′02″N 118°27′32″W	Drewsey	1124195
Miller Ditch	Baker	3,507 ft (1,069 m)	44°55′33″N 118°00′37″W	Rock Creek	1124196
Milton Ditch	Umatilla	1,083 ft (330 m)	45°55′30″N 118°23′02″W	Milton-Freewater	1124224
Mining Channel	Baker	2,776 ft (846 m)	44°53′05″N 117°08′14″W	Jimtown	1153705
Mission Ditch	Marion	184 ft (56 m)	44°55′27″N 123°00′49″W	Salem West	1163153
Mitchell Butte Lateral	Malheur	2,310 ft (700 m)	43°49′18″N 117°05′26″W	Owyhee	1124263
Modoc Point Main Canal	Klamath	4,163 ft (1,269 m)	42°32′36″N 121°52′32″W	Chiloquin	1146383
Moody Ditch	Union	3,425 ft (1,044 m)	45°02′44″N 117°58′39″W	North Powder	1116657
Moonshine Ditch	Wallowa	4,445 ft (1,355 m)	45°19′40″N 117°14′12″W	Joseph	1146430
Moore Pratt Ditch	Baker	3,323 ft (1,013 m)	44°56′32″N 117°57′10″W	Haines	1131473
Morfitt Ditch	Malheur	3,409 ft (1,039 m)	44°23′00″N 117°43′34″W	Bridgeport	1131887
Moroney Canal	Tillamook	20 ft (6.1 m)	45°37′44″N 123°56′15″W	Nehalem	1132399
Moss Ditch	Lake	4,764 ft (1,452 m)	42°31′25″N 120°26′39″W	Tucker Hill	1153754
Mount Hood Canal Hood	Hood River	1,535 ft (468 m)	45°32′04″N 121°34′12″W	Parkdale	1153230
Murphy Ditch	Josephine	1,033 ft (315 m)	42°20′44″N 123°21′31″W	Murphy	1157284
Murray Ditch	Grant	2,303 ft (702 m)	44°29′45″N 119°34′49″W	Dayville	1153771
N Canal	Umatilla	499 ft (152 m)	45°51′25″N 119°16′36″W	Hermiston	1124584
Neal Creek Lateral Hood	Hood River	961 ft (293 m)	45°37′24″N 121°29′54″W	Ketchum Reservoir	1146742
Nelson Ditch	Baker	3,986 ft (1,215 m)	44°49′49″N 118°00′30″W	Elkhorn Peak	1124651
Nesley Ditch	Union	2,785 ft (849 m)	45°20′38″N 118°05′12″W	La Grande	1164119
Nevada Canal	Malheur	2,208 ft (673 m)	43°59′16″N 117°06′12″W	Cairo	1124657
New Berryman Ditch	Jackson	1,276 ft (389 m)	42°15′19″N 123°11′44″W	Applegate	1135266
New Home Ditch	Baker	3,422 ft (1,043 m)	44°47′20″N 117°49′00″W	Baker City	1164120
Newt Young Ditch	Baker	2,352 ft (717 m)	44°47′17″N 117°09′52″W	Richland	1146816
North Alkali Creek Siphon	Malheur	2,493 ft (760 m)	43°37′20″N 117°04′29″W	Graveyard Point	1131221
North Antelope Canal	Malheur	4,262 ft (1,299 m)	42°55′50″N 117°15′34″W	Danner	1130455
North Canal	Malheur	2,533 ft (772 m)	43°52′00″N 117°06′40″W	Owyhee	1124724
North Canal	Klamath	4,101 ft (1,250 m)	42°03′40″N 121°45′46″W	Worden	1124725
North Canal	Klamath	4,190 ft (1,280 m)	42°09′05″N 121°16′58″W	Lorella	1124726
North Canal	Lake	4,856 ft (1,480 m)	42°08′00″N 120°33′07″W	Drews Gap	1146887
North Canal Flume	Lake	4,839 ft (1,475 m)	42°11′25″N 120°30′52″W	Drews Gap	1160988
North Canal Lateral	Malheur	2,503 ft (763 m)	43°57′10″N 117°05′25″W	Cairo	1124728
North Dixie Ditch	Baker	3,711 ft (1,131 m)	44°28′25″N 117°29′59″W	Rye Valley	1131861
North Fork Ditch	Klamath	4,485 ft (1,367 m)	42°27′40″N 121°02′54″W	Bly	1155309
North Oakander Drain	Malheur	2,264 ft (690 m)	43°42′09″N 117°03′18″W	Adrian	1124831
North Side Canal	Malheur	3,989 ft (1,216 m)	42°56′44″N 117°30′17″W	Arock	1124841
North Unit Main Canal	Deschutes	2,959 ft (902 m)	44°18′19″N 121°06′39″W	O'Neil	1147071
Nouque Ditch	Malheur	4,826 ft (1,471 m)	42°00′55″N 117°37′39″W	Tenmile Ranch	1130443
Number One C-Drain	Klamath	4,098 ft (1,249 m)	42°11′00″N 121°44′44″W	Altamont	1134733
Number Six Canal	Lake	4,846 ft (1,477 m)	42°09′31″N 120°30′06″W	Drews Gap	1146850
Nye Ditch	Jackson	2,441 ft (744 m)	42°43′24″N 122°32′39″W	Cascade Gorge	1116718
Nyssa Drain	Malheur	2,182 ft (665 m)	43°53′46″N 117°00′32″W	Cairo	1124872
Nyssa-Arcadia Drain	Malheur	2,182 ft (665 m)	43°53′30″N 117°00′16″W	Cairo	1166863
O Canal	Umatilla	472 ft (144 m)	45°54′32″N 119°16′44″W	Umatilla	1124873
O Pipe	Umatilla	466 ft (142 m)	45°53′54″N 119°15′12″W	Umatilla	1124874
O V L Ditch	Lake	4,308 ft (1,313 m)	42°30′45″N 120°18′24″W	Coglan Buttes SE	1131005
OA Lateral	Umatilla	463 ft (141 m)	45°54′02″N 119°16′27″W	Umatilla	1124875
OB Lateral	Umatilla	463 ft (141 m)	45°54′35″N 119°17′19″W	Umatilla	1124876
Oak Grove Ditch	Hood River	3,291 ft (1,003 m)	45°37′06″N 121°42′07″W	Dee	1147115
Oakander Drain	Malheur	2,244 ft (684 m)	43°42′40″N 117°03′51″W	Adrian	1124920
Ochoco Distribution Canal	Crook	2,982 ft (909 m)	44°20′59″N 120°52′09″W	Prineville	1153122
Ochoco Main Canal	Crook	3,051 ft (930 m)	44°19′30″N 120°47′04″W	Prineville	1147144
Oliver Drain	Malheur	4,318 ft (1,316 m)	43°03′54″N 117°18′11″W	Cow Lakes	1124984
Ontario Nyssa Canal	Malheur	2,297 ft (700 m)	43°53′48″N 117°02′15″W	Cairo	1125004
Orchard Ridge Ditch	Wasco	2,257 ft (688 m)	45°23′24″N 121°17′24″W	Wolf Run	1157088
Ordell Ditch	Union	2,713 ft (827 m)	45°23′04″N 118°02′03″W	Summerville	1147257
Oswego Canal	Clackamas	105 ft (32 m)	45°23′37″N 122°43′10″W	Lake Oswego	1125055
Outside Canal	Lake	4,314 ft (1,315 m)	42°40′13″N 120°25′45″W	Coglan Buttes	1147297
Owens Ditch	Grant	4,649 ft (1,417 m)	44°03′15″N 118°58′34″W	Silvies	1152973
Owyhee Canal	Malheur	2,372 ft (723 m)	44°01′04″N 117°12′22″W	Henry Gulch	1166691
Owyhee Ditch	Malheur	2,234 ft (681 m)	43°47′24″N 117°04′59″W	Owyhee	1125095
Owyhee Siphon	Malheur	2,333 ft (711 m)	43°44′10″N 117°10′39″W	Owyhee Dam	1131225
P P & L Canal	Jackson	2,628 ft (801 m)	42°45′04″N 122°30′26″W	Whetstone Point	1159373
P1 Canal	Siskiyou (CA)	4,091 ft (1,247 m)	41°59′06″N 121°38′35″W	Lower Klamath Lake	267150
Packwood Ditch	Baker	3,684 ft (1,123 m)	44°29′40″N 118°05′44″W	Hereford	1125120
Palmer Ditch	Crook	3,940 ft (1,200 m)	44°08′15″N 119°44′44″W	Powell Mountain	1157567
Panama Ditch	Grant	2,877 ft (877 m)	44°25′12″N 119°07′23″W	Mount Vernon	1152797
Parker Ditch	Malheur	4,902 ft (1,494 m)	42°38′48″N 117°03′58″W	Juniper Point	1131219
Patillo Ditches	Jackson	1,588 ft (484 m)	42°36′19″N 122°58′54″W	Boswell Mountain	1135443
Payton Ditch	Baker	3,346 ft (1,020 m)	44°52′08″N 117°54′04″W	Wingville	1125252
Pearson Ditch	Baker	3,340 ft (1,020 m)	45°00′12″N 117°57′54″W	North Powder	1131532
Pelican Cut Canal	Klamath	4,147 ft (1,264 m)	42°27′24″N 122°05′09″W	Pelican Bay	1135152
Peninsula Drainage Canal	Multnomah	13 ft (4.0 m)	45°35′37″N 122°38′25″W	Portland	1125284
Penstock Olsen Ditch	Baker	3,996 ft (1,218 m)	44°55′15″N 118°03′04″W	Rock Creek	1125294
Peoples Irrigation Company Ditch	Crook	2,838 ft (865 m)	44°19′39″N 120°54′37″W	Houston Lake	1129578
Perkins Ditch	Baker	2,707 ft (825 m)	44°49′47″N 117°31′00″W	Keating	1158416
Perrin Lateral	Marion	328 ft (100 m)	44°48′35″N 122°55′24″W	Turner	1125308
Peters Ditch	Linn	351 ft (107 m)	44°41′48″N 122°48′56″W	Scio	1125317
Pettegrew Lateral	Jackson	1,526 ft (465 m)	42°31′04″N 122°47′14″W	Shady Cove	1125336
Philling-McFadden Ditch	Wheeler	3,743 ft (1,141 m)	44°27′30″N 119°48′38″W	Antone	1157824
Phillips Ditch	Baker	5,072 ft (1,546 m)	45°02′00″N 117°28′05″W	Bennet Peak	1125346
Phillips Ditch	Baker	3,684 ft (1,123 m)	44°49′50″N 117°58′44″W	Wingville	1132506
Phillips Ditch	Baker	3,140 ft (960 m)	44°53′12″N 117°28′31″W	Balm Creek Reservoir	1147638
Phoenix Canal	Jackson	1,512 ft (461 m)	42°18′04″N 122°54′16″W	Medford West	1125349
Pilot Butte Canal	Deschutes	3,127 ft (953 m)	44°12′32″N 121°14′02″W	Forked Horn Butte	1147673
Pilot Butte North Canal	Crook	2,953 ft (900 m)	44°23′06″N 121°04′41″W	Gray Butte	1147675
Pilot Butte South Canal	Crook	2,894 ft (882 m)	44°23′01″N 121°03′15″W	Gray Butte	1147676
Placer Ditch	Grant	5,938 ft (1,810 m)	44°43′08″N 118°28′32″W	Greenhorn	1147787
Plainview Ditch	Deschutes	3,274 ft (998 m)	44°13′20″N 121°28′29″W	Tumalo Dam	1147791
Pleasant View Canal	Umatilla	971 ft (296 m)	45°56′38″N 118°24′27″W	Milton-Freewater	1125487
Plevna Ditch	Klamath	4,121 ft (1,256 m)	42°10′15″N 121°50′29″W	Klamath Falls	1162442
Pole Creek Ditch	Deschutes	3,898 ft (1,188 m)	44°14′15″N 121°36′18″W	Three Creek Butte	1147849
Poley-Allen Ditch	Wallowa	3,425 ft (1,044 m)	45°29′03″N 117°26′19″W	Lostine	1147860
Posy Valley Ditch	Baker	3,107 ft (947 m)	44°52′09″N 117°08′19″W	Richland	1147926
Potter Ditch	Wheeler	1,785 ft (544 m)	44°49′20″N 119°44′34″W	Kimberly	1116527
Poujade Ditch	Harney	4,144 ft (1,263 m)	43°37′28″N 118°43′24″W	Carson Point	1166779
Power Canal	Hood River	203 ft (62 m)	45°41′19″N 121°30′40″W	Hood River	1129666
Powers Ditch	Baker	3,681 ft (1,122 m)	44°59′51″N 118°04′38″W	Rock Creek	1125644
Prescott Ditch	Union	2,825 ft (861 m)	45°11′59″N 117°51′39″W	Union	1129460
Priday Ditch	Lake	5,243 ft (1,598 m)	42°26′15″N 120°05′34″W	Drake Peak NE	1131106
Pump Ditch	Malheur	2,346 ft (715 m)	43°58′52″N 117°16′11″W	Vale West	1125701
Purvis Drain	Malheur	2,313 ft (705 m)	43°55′50″N 117°22′04″W	Vale West	1129752
Q Street Canal	Lane	443 ft (135 m)	44°03′39″N 123°02′54″W	Eugene East	1129647
R Canal	Umatilla	541 ft (165 m)	45°52′34″N 119°18′43″W	Umatilla	1125758
R-3 Pipe	Umatilla	541 ft (165 m)	45°52′27″N 119°16′53″W	Hermiston	1125760
Red Ditch	Jackson	1,093 ft (333 m)	42°31′05″N 123°10′16″W	Wimer	1125876
Red Drain	Malheur	2,254 ft (687 m)	43°42′18″N 117°04′27″W	Adrian	1125877
Red House Ditch	Lake	4,334 ft (1,321 m)	42°42′55″N 120°30′39″W	Paisley	1148310
Reed Ditch	Baker	3,556 ft (1,084 m)	44°30′11″N 117°56′42″W	Brannan Gulch	1125922
Reed Ditch	Deschutes	3,261 ft (994 m)	44°15′59″N 121°32′04″W	Sisters	1153106
Reeds Ditch	Baker	3,550 ft (1,080 m)	44°30′00″N 117°56′14″W	Devils Heel	1131953
Rehart-Salt Creek Ditch	Lake	4,777 ft (1,456 m)	42°18′50″N 120°17′59″W	Crooked Creek Valley	1130997
Rineman Ditch	Harney	4,104 ft (1,251 m)	43°15′33″N 118°53′26″W	The Narrows	1159208
Ringsmeyer Ditch	Grant	2,303 ft (702 m)	44°29′02″N 119°33′54″W	Dayville	1153769
Riverside Canal	Malheur	2,260 ft (690 m)	43°42′10″N 117°03′39″W	Adrian	1126064
Robbins Ditch	Harney	3,757 ft (1,145 m)	43°52′43″N 118°35′55″W	Moffit Table	1148534
Robbins Drain	Malheur	2,313 ft (705 m)	43°55′25″N 117°22′04″W	Vale West	1129751
Robertson Ditch	Union	3,281 ft (1,000 m)	45°00′27″N 117°38′54″W	Medical Springs	1131546
Rock Creek Ditch	Wasco	1,932 ft (589 m)	45°11′49″N 121°18′19″W	Wamic	1153170
Rock Spring Siphon	Malheur	2,493 ft (760 m)	43°45′48″N 117°11′37″W	Mitchell Butte	1126218
Russell Drain	Malheur	2,277 ft (694 m)	43°55′10″N 117°17′04″W	Vale West	1129750
Rutherford Ditch	Malheur	3,619 ft (1,103 m)	44°21′04″N 117°52′35″W	Ironside	1161052
Ryegrass Ditch	Crook	2,867 ft (874 m)	44°19′13″N 120°51′46″W	Prineville	1148882
S Canal	Umatilla	463 ft (141 m)	45°53′33″N 119°15′52″W	Umatilla	1126396
Saint Clair Canal	Harney	4,108 ft (1,252 m)	43°16′46″N 119°14′04″W	Northwest Harney Lake	1133760
Salem Ditch	Marion	433 ft (132 m)	44°48′22″N 122°49′14″W	Stayton	1126505
Sand Creek Canal	Klamath	4,636 ft (1,413 m)	42°52′24″N 121°53′29″W	Sun Pass	1154994
Scott Ditch	Malheur	3,583 ft (1,092 m)	42°47′39″N 117°44′53″W	Rome	1126687
Scott Ditch	Wasco	3,383 ft (1,031 m)	45°07′44″N 117°57′46″W	Craig Mountain	1130904
Scotts Ditch	Malheur	4,564 ft (1,391 m)	42°41′25″N 117°19′53″W	Skull Creek	1157305
Seely Ditch	Clackamas	144 ft (44 m)	45°18′59″N 122°47′04″W	Sherwood	1162796
Segundo Ditch	Malheur	4,951 ft (1,509 m)	42°12′00″N 117°53′51″W	Oregon Canyon Ranch	1133156
Sevenmile Canal	Klamath	4,144 ft (1,263 m)	42°34′59″N 121°58′04″W	Agency Lake	1154302
Sevenmile Ditch	Klamath	4,183 ft (1,275 m)	42°41′55″N 122°03′34″W	Mares Egg Spring	1134810
Sharp Ditch	Malheur	4,321 ft (1,317 m)	42°59′20″N 117°09′51″W	Antelope Reservoir	1130453
Shaw Brant Ditch	Union	3,514 ft (1,071 m)	45°04′32″N 117°58′31″W	North Powder	1149295
Shaw Ditch	Union	3,412 ft (1,040 m)	45°00′52″N 117°58′23″W	North Powder	1149298
Shaw Stewart Ditch	Baker	3,592 ft (1,095 m)	44°41′48″N 117°51′23″W	Bowen Valley	1126807
Sheep Creek Siphon	Malheur	2,516 ft (767 m)	43°54′29″N 117°05′01″W	Cairo	1126821
Sheep L Ditch	Harney	4,436 ft (1,352 m)	43°32′55″N 119°45′09″W	Potato Hills	1129714
Sheep Ridge Ditch	Wallowa	3,609 ft (1,100 m)	45°28′16″N 117°24′39″W	Lostine	1149335
Shelton Ditch	Marion	184 ft (56 m)	44°55′33″N 123°00′34″W	Salem West	1163266
Shoemaker Ditch	Wheeler	3,514 ft (1,071 m)	44°31′34″N 120°08′39″W	Mitchell	1158711
Short Low Ditch	Umatilla	584 ft (178 m)	46°00′19″N 118°34′24″W	Lowden	1157399
Sidney Ditch	Marion	279 ft (85 m)	44°44′02″N 122°57′53″W	Crabtree	1163271
Sidney Power Ditch	Marion	200 ft (61 m)	44°46′57″N 123°04′16″W	Sidney	1126949
Siegle Ditch	Baker	2,320 ft (710 m)	44°43′50″N 117°07′54″W	Daly Creek	1129562
Silver Grange Ditch	Wallowa	7,447 ft (2,270 m)	45°22′01″N 117°21′57″W	Chief Joseph Mountain	1149497
Silver L Canal	Lake	4,439 ft (1,353 m)	43°06′20″N 121°03′44″W	Hager Mountain	1153864
Silver Lake Ditch	Wallowa	4,255 ft (1,297 m)	45°21′16″N 117°08′25″W	Joseph	1149502
Singer Drain	Malheur	2,201 ft (671 m)	43°42′43″N 117°04′36″W	Adrian	1126999
Sitz Ditch	Harney	3,655 ft (1,114 m)	43°50′10″N 118°29′04″W	Drewsey	1160500
Skipanon Waterway	Clatsop	7 ft (2.1 m)	46°10′35″N 123°54′38″W	Warrenton	1127030
Skunk Farm Canal	Harney	4,140 ft (1,260 m)	43°05′25″N 118°50′11″W	Diamond Swamp	1127046
Slide Ditch	Malheur	2,100 ft (640 m)	44°14′10″N 117°00′44″W	Moores Hollow	1131828
Slusher Canal	Umatilla	738 ft (225 m)	45°40′54″N 119°05′39″W	Nolin	1129670
Smith Ditch	Morrow	4,859 ft (1,481 m)	45°09′55″N 119°19′22″W	Arbuckle Mountain	1149752
Smith Ditch	Deschutes	3,192 ft (973 m)	44°17′24″N 121°33′04″W	Sisters	1153105
Smith Ditch	Crook	3,363 ft (1,025 m)	44°18′24″N 120°36′24″W	Cadle Butte	1153127
Smith Ditch	Baker	3,615 ft (1,102 m)	44°44′10″N 117°49′45″W	Bowen Valley	1164135
Smith McPhee Ditch	Baker	3,330 ft (1,010 m)	44°59′06″N 117°55′59″W	Haines	1127128
Snively Siphon	Malheur	2,339 ft (713 m)	43°43′00″N 117°10′59″W	Owyhee Dam	1131224
Snow Creek Ditch	Deschutes	3,898 ft (1,188 m)	44°08′34″N 121°29′39″W	Tumalo Dam	1149814
Sodom Ditch	Linn	269 ft (82 m)	44°26′52″N 123°03′22″W	Halsey	1127194
South Alkali Drain	Malheur	2,274 ft (693 m)	43°43′03″N 117°02′25″W	Adrian	1127227
South Antelope Canal	Malheur	4,262 ft (1,299 m)	42°55′04″N 117°17′08″W	Danner	1130454
South Canal	Owyhee (ID)	2,493 ft (760 m)	43°31′42″N 116°57′47″W	Homedale	375136
South Canal	Malheur	2,543 ft (775 m)	43°39′47″N 117°05′51″W	Adrian	1127236
South Canal	Lake	4,783 ft (1,458 m)	42°02′24″N 120°33′00″W	Fitzwater Point	1149908
South Catherine Ditch	Union	6,329 ft (1,929 m)	45°05′44″N 117°30′47″W	Flagstaff Butte	1127237
South Diamond Canal	Harney	4,144 ft (1,263 m)	43°01′38″N 118°47′28″W	Diamond Swamp	1127248
South Ditch	Umatilla	548 ft (167 m)	45°59′50″N 118°38′38″W	Smeltz	1158495
South Dixie Ditch	Baker	3,438 ft (1,048 m)	44°26′35″N 117°28′34″W	Rye Valley	1131840
South Fork Canal	Jackson	4,665 ft (1,422 m)	42°18′29″N 122°22′14″W	Brown Mountain	1116638
South Highline Canal	Josephine	1,043 ft (318 m)	42°24′44″N 123°19′04″W	Grants Pass	1135235
South Main Canal	Josephine	961 ft (293 m)	42°25′04″N 123°19′04″W	Grants Pass	1135236
South Side Canal	Malheur	4,029 ft (1,228 m)	42°52′44″N 117°28′11″W	Threemile Hill	1150080
Southworth Ditch	Grant	4,692 ft (1,430 m)	44°09′20″N 118°57′19″W	Seneca	1152972
Spence Ditch	Umatilla	1,260 ft (380 m)	45°54′09″N 118°20′34″W	Bowlus Hill	1638733
Spring Creek Ditch	Baker	3,150 ft (960 m)	44°50′25″N 117°12′39″W	Richland	1161770
Springer Ditch	Wasco	4,485 ft (1,367 m)	45°21′04″N 121°27′26″W	Flag Point	1158502
Stacey Ditch	Malheur	2,336 ft (712 m)	43°56′50″N 117°24′59″W	Vines Hill	1129746
Stallard Ditch	Harney	3,570 ft (1,090 m)	43°50′35″N 118°18′49″W	Drinkwater Pass	1160504
Stanfield Branch Furnish Ditch	Umatilla	653 ft (199 m)	45°48′08″N 119°10′56″W	Stanfield	1127526
Stanfield Drain	Umatilla	623 ft (190 m)	45°47′19″N 119°10′49″W	Stanfield	1129797
Star Creek Ditch	Malheur	4,905 ft (1,495 m)	43°25′45″N 117°56′51″W	Star Creek Reservoir	1164027
State Ditch	Union	2,684 ft (818 m)	45°23′25″N 117°55′51″W	Imbler	1150363
Stearns Ditch	Crook	2,907 ft (886 m)	44°13′19″N 120°52′29″W	Stearns Butte	1130932
Sterling Ditch	Jackson	2,477 ft (755 m)	42°11′53″N 122°56′49″W	Sterling Creek	1150410
Steward Ditch	Baker	3,107 ft (947 m)	44°52′20″N 117°29′04″W	Glasgow Butte	1129433
Steward Ditch	Grant	2,480 ft (760 m)	44°27′35″N 119°25′34″W	Aldrich Mountain North	1153956
Stewart Carter Ditch	Malheur	2,178 ft (664 m)	44°01′03″N 116°59′30″W	Payette	1127597
Stewart Ditch	Grant	2,480 ft (760 m)	44°27′35″N 119°25′34″W	Aldrich Mountain North	1161631
Stock Ditch	Lake	4,308 ft (1,313 m)	42°39′35″N 120°28′37″W	Coglan Buttes	1127618
Stockwater Ditch	Harney	4,550 ft (1,390 m)	42°24′45″N 118°55′14″W	Garrison Lake	1129759
Stradley Drain	Malheur	2,260 ft (690 m)	43°41′48″N 117°03′52″W	Adrian	1127646
Strode Ditch	Malheur	3,862 ft (1,177 m)	43°18′05″N 117°04′02″W	Rockville	1130436
Stubblefield Canal	Harney	4,117 ft (1,255 m)	43°11′28″N 118°56′36″W	Coyote Buttes	1127668
Succor Creek Siphon	Malheur	2,523 ft (769 m)	43°35′10″N 117°04′24″W	Graveyard Point	1131220
Summer Lake I D Canal	Lake	4,275 ft (1,303 m)	42°56′40″N 120°47′49″W	Summer Lake	1153851
Sunnyslope Ditch	Union	3,317 ft (1,011 m)	45°03′18″N 117°55′26″W	North Powder	1127736
Swalley Canal	Deschutes	3,438 ft (1,048 m)	44°06′46″N 121°17′18″W	Bend	1150727
Swayne Ditch	Jackson	1,591 ft (485 m)	42°08′49″N 123°03′24″W	Ruch	1155054
Swinger Ditch	Baker	3,405 ft (1,038 m)	44°54′50″N 117°52′20″W	Magpie Peak	1150788
T Canal	Klamath	4,137 ft (1,261 m)	42°02′35″N 121°23′57″W	Malin	1127851
T Canal	Umatilla	472 ft (144 m)	45°53′34″N 119°14′38″W	Hat Rock	1127852
Table Rock Canal	Jackson	1,217 ft (371 m)	42°27′19″N 122°54′39″W	Sams Valley	1134762
Talent Lateral	Jackson	1,719 ft (524 m)	42°16′13″N 122°51′58″W	Medford East	1161540
Talent Middle Canal	Jackson	1,696 ft (517 m)	42°15′29″N 122°50′01″W	Medford East	1134787
Taylor Ditch	Baker	4,281 ft (1,305 m)	44°40′25″N 117°24′59″W	Lawrence Creek	1129440
Taylor Ditch	Umatilla	682 ft (208 m)	45°42′49″N 119°10′34″W	Echo	1129888
The Drain	Josephine	876 ft (267 m)	42°25′47″N 123°25′34″W	Wilderville	1135455
The Mill Ditch	Grant	3,609 ft (1,100 m)	44°26′54″N 118°42′20″W	Prairie City	1151026
Thompson Ditch	Baker	4,003 ft (1,220 m)	44°31′42″N 118°13′41″W	Unity Reservoir	1153984
Three Sisters Canal	Deschutes	2,818 ft (859 m)	44°20′18″N 121°23′27″W	Henkle Butte	1150262
Threemile Ditch	Wasco	2,090 ft (640 m)	45°14′11″N 121°19′49″W	Wamic	1151192
Throop Ditch	Grant	2,342 ft (714 m)	44°28′42″N 119°31′59″W	Dayville	1153768
Tiger Ditch	Baker	3,996 ft (1,218 m)	44°28′30″N 118°13′59″W	Unity	1153978
Tobin Ditch	Baker	2,612 ft (796 m)	44°49′11″N 117°12′27″W	Richland	1151291
Tokay Canal	Josephine	1,109 ft (338 m)	42°26′34″N 123°18′04″W	Grants Pass	1135239
Townsite Ditch	Malheur	3,002 ft (915 m)	43°44′43″N 118°05′38″W	Juntura	1128180
Travillion-Koester ditch	Baker	3,255 ft (992 m)	45°00′00″N 117°52′51″W	North Powder	1131533
Trout Creek	Union	6,237 ft (1,901 m)	45°04′52″N 117°30′34″W	Flagstaff Butte	1128236
Trowbridge Ditch	Grant	3,120 ft (950 m)	44°25′28″N 118°56′54″W	John Day	1638244
Tudor Ditch	Malheur	3,924 ft (1,196 m)	42°41′25″N 117°54′34″W	Flat Top Mountain	1130448
Tumalo Canal	Deschutes	3,327 ft (1,014 m)	44°11′10″N 121°22′38″W	Tumalo Dam	1151489
Tumalo Feed Canal	Deschutes	3,537 ft (1,078 m)	44°07′06″N 121°22′59″W	Shevlin Park	1151494
Tunnel Millrace	Lane	561 ft (171 m)	43°53′21″N 123°00′43″W	Creswell	1128299
U S B Line Canal	Umatilla	676 ft (206 m)	45°47′59″N 119°14′49″W	Stanfield	1129811
Umatilla Drain	Umatilla	440 ft (130 m)	45°53′59″N 119°18′02″W	Umatilla	1128401
Uncle Tom Slough	Columbia	13 ft (4.0 m)	46°07′19″N 123°15′54″W	Marshland	1132301
Upper Ditch	Malheur	2,205 ft (672 m)	44°10′39″N 116°59′03″W	Weiser South	1128445
Upper Fisher Long Ditch	Baker	3,691 ft (1,125 m)	44°55′19″N 118°02′04″W	Rock Creek	1128450
Upper Hanley Canal	Harney	4,140 ft (1,260 m)	43°34′03″N 118°58′05″W	Poison Creek Slough	1128454
Upper Pump Canal	Malheur	2,264 ft (690 m)	43°58′30″N 117°08′54″W	Vale East	1164024
Upper West Lateral	Jackson	2,172 ft (662 m)	42°12′52″N 122°48′19″W	Talent	1151710
Upton Lateral	Jackson	1,286 ft (392 m)	42°23′29″N 122°53′22″W	Sams Valley	1134759
Urlezaga Ditch	Malheur	4,324 ft (1,318 m)	42°59′22″N 117°09′04″W	Antelope Reservoir	1130452
V Canal	Klamath	4,170 ft (1,270 m)	42°03′39″N 121°25′24″W	Malin	1128490
Vale Oregon Canal	Malheur	2,569 ft (783 m)	43°59′41″N 117°19′42″W	Vale West	1639340
Valley View Drain	Malheur	2,182 ft (665 m)	43°58′20″N 116°59′44″W	Nyssa	1163881
Van Brimmer Canal	Klamath	4,081 ft (1,244 m)	42°00′06″N 121°36′05″W	Merrill	1128501
Vines Ditch	Malheur	2,365 ft (721 m)	43°56′19″N 117°26′32″W	Vines Hill	1128543
Visher Feed Canal	Malheur	3,612 ft (1,101 m)	43°26′00″N 118°11′24″W	McEwen Butte	1131823
Volmer Ditch	Hood River	2,723 ft (830 m)	45°28′27″N 121°37′14″W	Dog River	1154331
Vroman Ditch	Jackson	1,148 ft (350 m)	42°31′49″N 123°09′24″W	Wimer	1135415
W A Lateral	Klamath	4,278 ft (1,304 m)	43°36′47″N 121°33′49″W	Masten Butte	1153037
W R Lateral	Deschutes	4,272 ft (1,302 m)	43°36′49″N 121°32′54″W	Masten Butte	1153036
Wade Ditch	Wallowa	3,438 ft (1,048 m)	45°28′27″N 117°22′55″W	Lostine	1151795
Walker Basin Canal	Klamath	4,288 ft (1,307 m)	43°35′29″N 121°34′09″W	Masten Butte	1153038
Walker Ditch	Marion	135 ft (41 m)	45°04′02″N 122°49′34″W	Silverton	1161027
Walker Drain	Malheur	2,244 ft (684 m)	43°40′58″N 117°04′00″W	Adrian	1128592
Wallowa Valley Improvement Canal	Wallowa	4,934 ft (1,504 m)	45°18′10″N 117°06′32″W	Kinney Lake	1151866
Walterville Canal	Lane	551 ft (168 m)	44°04′04″N 122°50′28″W	Walterville	1128621
Wapinitia Canal	Wasco	1,923 ft (586 m)	45°09′14″N 121°13′09″W	Tygh Valley	1153136
Ward Drain	Malheur	2,182 ft (665 m)	43°52′05″N 117°00′19″W	Owyhee	1166866
Warm Springs Canal	Harney	4,183 ft (1,275 m)	42°50′39″N 118°54′54″W	Frenchglen	1128651
Warm Springs Pump Canal	Malheur	2,313 ft (705 m)	44°02′08″N 117°16′21″W	Willowcreek	1166718
Waterbury Ditch	Baker	2,444 ft (745 m)	44°47′55″N 117°12′00″W	Richland	1151942
Watts and Topping Ditch	Josephine	1,191 ft (363 m)	42°17′24″N 123°14′36″W	Applegate	1135261
Weatherspoon Ditch	Baker	4,764 ft (1,452 m)	45°40′00″N 117°16′44″W	Sled Springs	1129537
Welch Drain	Malheur	2,211 ft (674 m)	43°41′29″N 117°03′01″W	Adrian	1128781
Wendt Ditch	Baker	3,402 ft (1,037 m)	44°29′12″N 117°43′56″W	Bridgeport	1128802
West Canal	Klamath	4,150 ft (1,260 m)	42°04′48″N 121°15′23″W	Bryant Mountain	1128815
West Canal	Klamath	4,098 ft (1,249 m)	42°01′25″N 121°51′24″W	Worden	1162439
West Extension Irrigation Canal	Morrow	397 ft (121 m)	45°54′04″N 119°25′55″W	Irrigon	1128829
West Lateral	Jackson	1,985 ft (605 m)	42°14′27″N 122°49′18″W	Talent	1152132
West Side Ditch	Grant	4,554 ft (1,388 m)	43°58′10″N 118°57′19″W	Trout Creek	1154246
Westland A Canal	Umatilla	561 ft (171 m)	45°51′24″N 119°21′19″W	Hermiston	1129833
Westland F Canal	Umatilla	535 ft (163 m)	45°50′19″N 119°21′29″W	Hermiston	1129832
Westside Ditch	Wallowa	3,625 ft (1,105 m)	45°28′50″N 117°26′54″W	Lostine	1152160
Wham Whited Ditch	Baker	3,911 ft (1,192 m)	44°29′30″N 118°12′44″W	Unity	1153979
Whitby Ditch	Benton	249 ft (76 m)	44°28′16″N 123°18′23″W	Greenberry	1136901
White Ditch	Umatilla	640 ft (200 m)	45°58′13″N 118°34′01″W	Waterman	1128977
Whiteline Ditch	Klamath	4,426 ft (1,349 m)	42°19′55″N 121°44′19″W	Whiteline Reservoir	1132655
Wilcox Ditch	Lake	4,951 ft (1,509 m)	42°15′25″N 120°21′04″W	Crooked Creek Valley	1130999
Wilcox Ditch	Baker	3,976 ft (1,212 m)	44°54′21″N 118°02′48″W	Rock Creek	1158553
Willamette Falls Locks and Canal	Clackamas	10 ft (3.0 m)	45°21′18″N 122°37′3.47″W		
Willams Ditch	Harney	3,530 ft (1,080 m)	43°48′10″N 118°19′54″W	Drinkwater Pass	1132009
Williams Ditch	Baker	3,976 ft (1,212 m)	44°50′55″N 118°00′34″W	Elkhorn Peak	1129117
Williams Ditch	Baker	3,504 ft (1,068 m)	44°57′10″N 118°01′07″W	Rock Creek	1129118
Williams Ditch	Baker	4,491 ft (1,369 m)	44°22′49″N 118°09′54″W	Unity	1152389
Williams Drain	Klamath	4,331 ft (1,320 m)	42°25′05″N 121°21′24″W	Beatty	1155315
Williams and Whalen Ditch	Jackson	1,207 ft (368 m)	42°32′59″N 123°07′33″W	McConville Peak	1135409
Williamson River Ditch	Klamath	4,554 ft (1,388 m)	42°59′24″N 121°31′29″W	Wildhorse Ridge	1155412
Willow Valley Canal	Klamath	4,423 ft (1,348 m)	42°00′50″N 121°08′34″W	Langell Valley	1133113
Wilson Ditch	Lake	4,885 ft (1,489 m)	42°19′20″N 120°22′26″W	Crooked Creek Valley	1130995
Wocus Drainage Canal	Klamath	4,131 ft (1,259 m)	42°14′54″N 121°54′19″W	Keno	1161598
Wolf Run Ditch	Wasco	2,913 ft (888 m)	45°24′59″N 121°20′47″W	Wolf Run	1152602
Wood River Canal	Klamath	4,144 ft (1,263 m)	42°37′39″N 121°58′28″W	Fort Klamath	1134239
Wrenn Dobbin Ditch	Wallowa	4,117 ft (1,255 m)	45°22′02″N 117°12′25″W	Joseph	1152658
Wright Ditch	Union	3,330 ft (1,010 m)	45°00′46″N 117°39′06″W	Medical Springs	1131547
Y J Canal	Klamath	4,531 ft (1,381 m)	42°57′29″N 121°35′54″W	Wildhorse Ridge	1154999
Yamsay Land and Cattle Company Ditch	Klamath	4,531 ft (1,381 m)	42°51′24″N 121°48′34″W	Fuego	1154991
Yankee Creek Siphon	Jackson	1,542 ft (470 m)	42°25′14″N 122°44′16″W	Brownsboro	1129353
Yonna Ditch	Klamath	4,153 ft (1,266 m)	42°13′29″N 121°26′52″W	Bonanza	1152741
Young Ditch	Malheur	3,734 ft (1,138 m)	44°20′10″N 117°56′34″W	Ironside	1131942
Z Canal	Umatilla	535 ft (163 m)	45°52′10″N 119°16′58″W	Hermiston	1129405
ZX Brattain Ditch	Lake	4,314 ft (1,315 m)	42°38′43″N 120°30′39″W	Paisley	1152790
Zell Ditch	Umatilla	1,161 ft (354 m)	45°54′41″N 118°22′01″W	Bowlus Hill	1638734
Zimmerman Ditch	Malheur	3,947 ft (1,203 m)	42°58′05″N 117°39′34″W	Owyhee Butte	1131801

== See also ==
- Lists of Oregon-related topics
