= Sublimity, Oregon =

- City
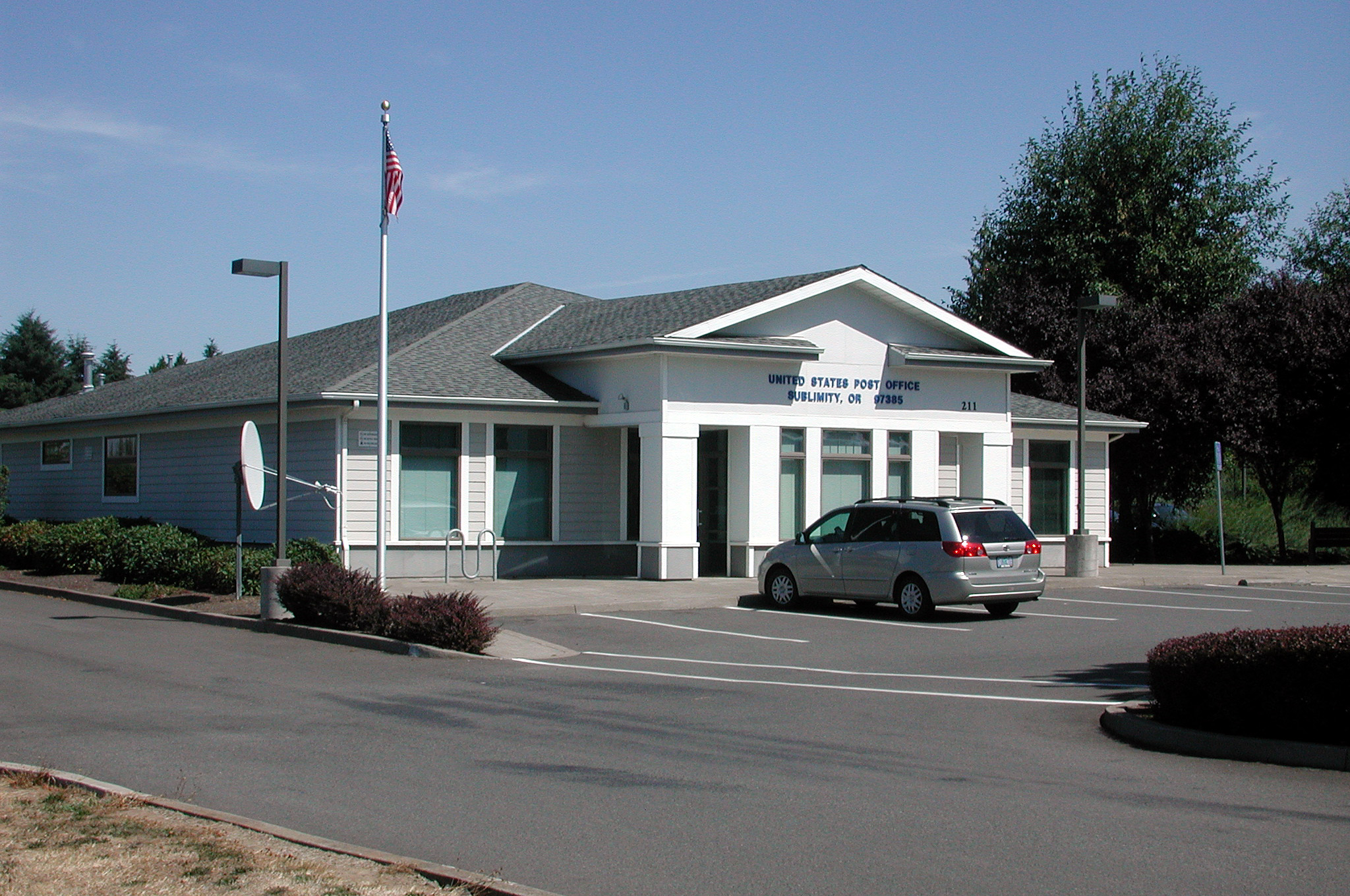
- Post office in Sublimity

- Location in Oregon
- Coordinates: 44°49′46″N 122°47′32″W
- Country: United States
- State: Oregon
- County: Marion
- Incorporated: 1903

Government
  - Mayor: Michael Taylor

Area
  - Total: 0.94 sq mi (2.43 km^{2})
  - Land: 0.94 sq mi (2.43 km^{2})
  - Water: 0 sq mi (0.00 km^{2})
- Elevation: 554 ft (169 m)

Population (2020)
  - Total: 2,967
  - Density: 3,163.6/sq mi (1,221.46/km^{2})
- Time zone: UTC-8 (Pacific)
  - Summer (DST): UTC-7 (Pacific)
- ZIP Code: 97385
- Area code: 503
- FIPS code: 41-70700
- GNIS feature ID: 2411991
- Website: www.cityofsublimity.org

Sublimity is a city in Marion County, Oregon, United States. The population was 2,967 at the 2020 census. It is part of the Salem Metropolitan Statistical Area.

== Geography ==
The city is in southern Marion County, 16 miles (26 km) southeast of Salem, the state capital and Marion county seat. It is bordered to the south by Stayton. Oregon Route 22 passes between Sublimity and Stayton, leading northwest to Salem and east 38 miles (61 km) up the North Santiam River valley to Detroit.

According to the U.S. Census Bureau, Sublimity has a total area of 0.94 square miles (2.43 km^{2}), all land. Streams in the city flow west to Mill Creek, which flows northwest to join the Willamette River in Salem.

== Demographics ==
Historical population
Census	Pop.	Note	%±
1910	138		—
1920	172		24.6%
1930	214		24.4%
1940	280		30.8%
1950	367		31.1%
1960	490		33.5%
1970	634		29.4%
1980	1,077		69.9%
1990	1,491		38.4%
2000	2,148		44.1%
2010	2,681		24.8%
2020	2,967		10.7%
U.S. Decennial Census

=== 2020 census ===
As of the 2020 census, Sublimity had a population of 2,967 and a median age of 52.0 years. 18.7% of residents were under the age of 18 and 32.2% of residents were 65 years of age or older. For every 100 females there were 88.4 males, and for every 100 females age 18 and over there were 83.8 males age 18 and over.

99.6% of residents lived in urban areas, while 0.4% lived in rural areas.

There were 1,128 households in Sublimity, of which 27.8% had children under the age of 18 living in them. Of all households, 57.0% were married-couple households, 13.3% were households with a male householder and no spouse or partner present, and 25.1% were households with a female householder and no spouse or partner present. About 26.3% of all households were made up of individuals and 17.7% had someone living alone who was 65 years of age or older.

There were 1,147 housing units, of which 1.7% were vacant. Among occupied housing units, 74.4% were owner-occupied and 25.6% were renter-occupied. The homeowner vacancy rate was 0.2% and the rental vacancy rate was 3.3%.

Racial composition as of the 2020 census
Race	Number	Percent
White	2,654	89.5%
Black or African American	12	0.4%
American Indian and Alaska Native	23	0.8%
Asian	29	1.0%
Native Hawaiian and Other Pacific Islander	4	0.1%
Some other race	43	1.4%
Two or more races	202	6.8%
Hispanic or Latino (of any race)	149	5.0%

=== 2010 census ===
As of the census of 2010, there were 2,681 people, 1,063 households, and 678 families living in the city. The population density was 2,882.8 inhabitants per square mile (1,113.1/km^{2}). There were 1,142 housing units at an average density of 1,228.0 per square mile (474.1/km^{2}). The racial makeup of the city was 95.8% White, 0.2% African American, 0.5% Native American, 0.4% Asian, 1.0% from other races, and 2.0% from two or more races. Hispanic or Latino of any race were 3.1% of the population.

There were 1,063 households, of which 27.5% had children under the age of 18 living with them, 53.9% were married couples living together, 7.2% had a female householder with no husband present, 2.6% had a male householder with no wife present, and 36.2% were non-families. 33.2% of all households were made up of individuals, and 24.4% had someone living alone who was 65 years of age or older. The average household size was 2.33 and the average family size was 2.97.

The median age in the city was 47.6 years. 21.6% of residents were under the age of 18; 5.6% were between the ages of 18 and 24; 18.8% were from 25 to 44; 24.9% were from 45 to 64; and 29% were 65 years of age or older. The gender makeup of the city was 47.1% male and 52.9% female.

=== 2000 census ===
As of the United States 2000 Census, there were 2,148 people, 686 households, and 509 families living in the city. The population density was 2,259.7 inhabitants per square mile (872.5/km^{2}). There were 711 housing units at an average density of 748.0 per square mile (288.8/km^{2}). The racial makeup of the city was 97.44% White, 0.09% African American, 0.47% Native American, 0.28% Asian, 0.23% Pacific Islander, 0.23% from other races, and 1.26% from two or more races. Hispanic or Latino of any race were 1.63% of the population.

There were 686 households, out of which 36.2% had children under the age of 18 living with them, 65.6% were married couples living together, 6.6% had a female householder with no husband present, and 25.7% were non-families. 22.0% of all households were made up of individuals, and 13.7% had someone living alone who was 65 years of age or older. The average household size was 2.67 and the average family size was 3.14.

In the city, the population was spread out, with 24.3% under the age of 18, 5.4% from 18 to 24, 22.2% from 25 to 44, 18.7% from 45 to 64, and 29.3% who were 65 years of age or older. The median age was 43 years. For every 100 females, there were 81.7 males. For every 100 females age 18 and over, there were 75.5 males.

The median income for a household in the city was $49,034, and the median income for a family was $55,921. Males had a median income of $42,734 versus $25,924 for females. The per capita income for the city was $18,646. About 4.9% of families and 7.5% of the population were below the poverty line, including 7.8% of those under age 18 and 8.9% of those age 65 or over.

== Historic buildings ==
Historic buildings in Sublimity include:

- St. Boniface Church
