= Cathedral of the Holy Trinity (New Ulm, Minnesota) =

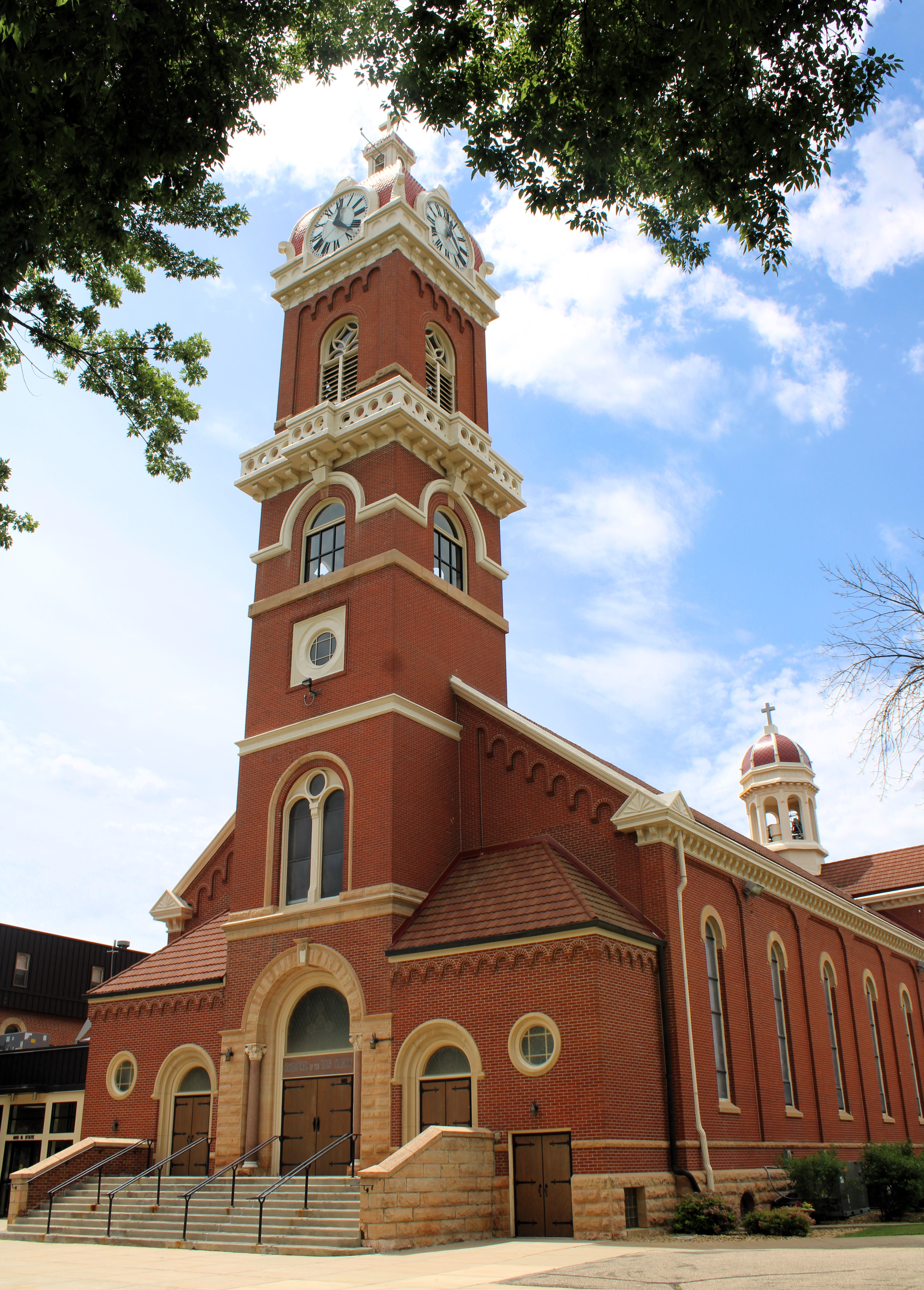
- The cathedral in 2024.

- Location in Minnesota
- 44°19′05″N 94°28′06″W
- Location: 605 N. State Street; New Ulm, Minnesota
- Country: United States
- Denomination: Roman Catholic Church
- Website: www.holycrossafc.org

History
- Status: Cathedral/Parish
- Founded: 1858

Architecture
- Style: Neo-Baroque
- Completed: 1893

Specifications
- Materials: Brick

Administration
- Diocese: New Ulm

Clergy
- Bishop: Most Rev. Chad Zielinski
- Rector: Msgr. Douglas L. Grams

The Cathedral of the Holy Trinity is a Roman Catholic cathedral in New Ulm, Minnesota, in the United States and is the seat of the Diocese of New Ulm.

The cathedral parish is now part of the Holy Cross Area Faith Community with three other parishes.

== History ==
=== Holy Trinity Church ===
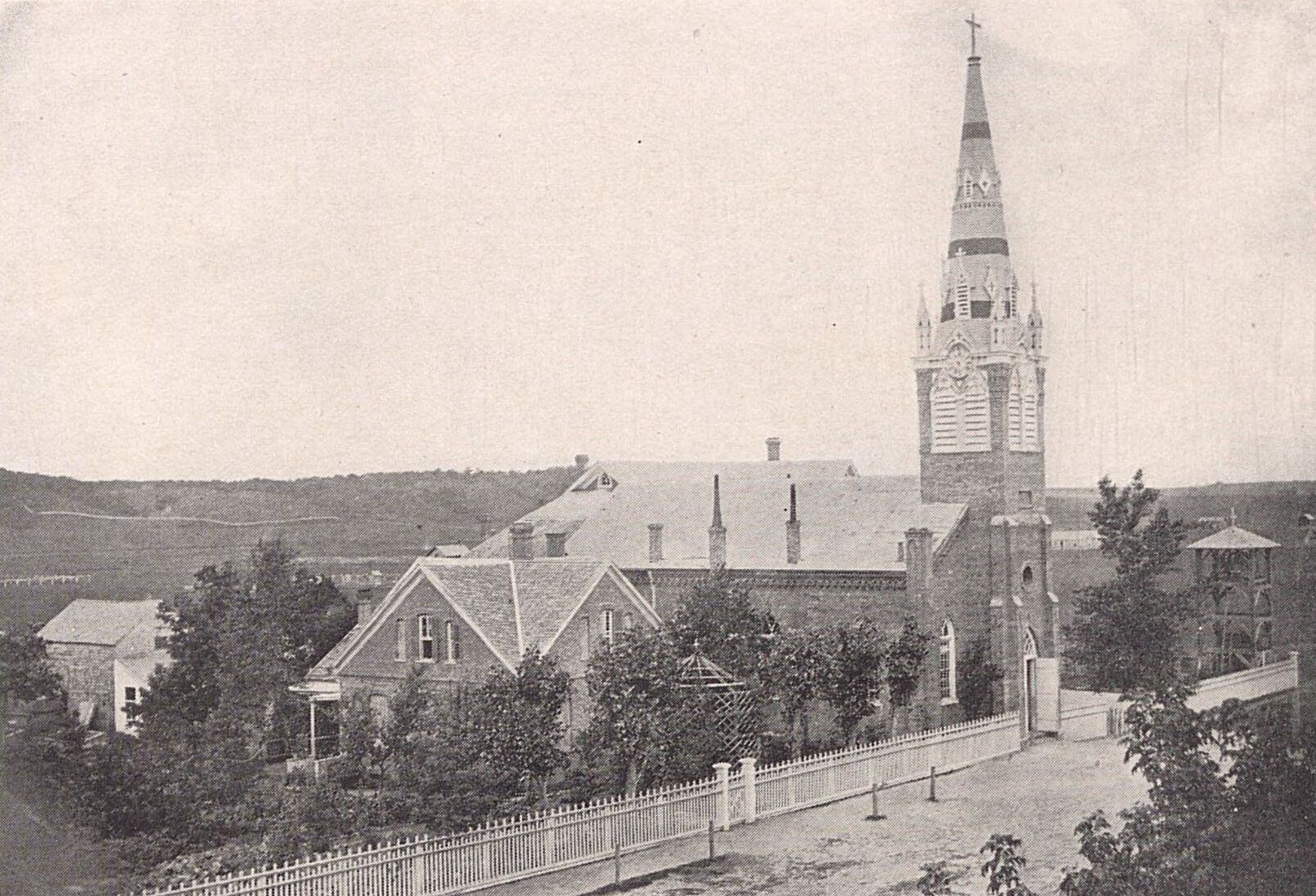
The second Holy Trinity Church, New Ulm, Minnesota

The predecessors to the Cathedral of the Holy Trinity were three Holy Trinity Churches in New Ulm. In 1856, the missionary priest Franz Weningerin began visiting Catholics in the New Ulm area. At that time, the area was part of the Diocese of St. Paul.

The first Holy Trinity Church was a wooden structure that was started in 1858. It was still under construction when the five-week Dakota War of 1862 broke out. At one point, the residents of New Ulm destroyed the structure to prevent members of the Dakota tribe from using it as a barricade.

After the war, a local resident gave Bishop Thomas Grace of St. Paul two lots for the construction of the second Holy Trinity Church. The cornerstone was laid on September 1, 1866. Alexander Berghold was assigned as the first resident priest there in 1868. The new church, which measured 36 by 97 feet (11 by 30 m). was dedicated by Grace on December 11, 1870. The second church was destroyed by a tornado on July 15, 1881. Fundraising for a third church was completed by September 1888.

The cornerstone for the third Holy Trinity Church was laid on May 4, 1890. The steeple was completed in 1893 and the interior decorations were finished in 1903. Two new side entrances to the church were added in 1940 as was the terrazzo floor. The paintings were cleaned and restored

=== Cathedral of the Holy Trinity ===
The Diocese of New Ulm was established by Pope Pius XII on November 18, 1957. Holy Trinity was named as the diocese's new cathedral. Alphonse Schladweiler of St. Paul was named the first Bishop of New Ulm and was consecrated in Holy Trinity.

The diocese in 1965 enlarged the rectory on the cathedral grounds, adding a library, offices and an apartment.A renovation of the cathedral was completed in 1987. The lower level of the church was renovated into the Antony Leifeld Community Hall.

=== Holy Cross Area Faith Community ===
In 2005, the Cathedral of the Holy Trinity became part of the Holy Cross Area Faith Community with four other parishes. The diocese in 2015 assigned one pastor to all five parishes. St. Gregory the Great Parish closed in 2021, leaving only four parishes.

== Cathedral interior ==
The wall decorations of the Baroque style building are of numerous saints, angels and the life of Christ painted in dark colors and accented in gold leaf. An apse features an image of the Holy Trinity with the Twelve Apostles. Alexander Schwendinger was commissioned to decorate the interior and he was assisted by Christ Heller and Anton Gag.

Cathedral images

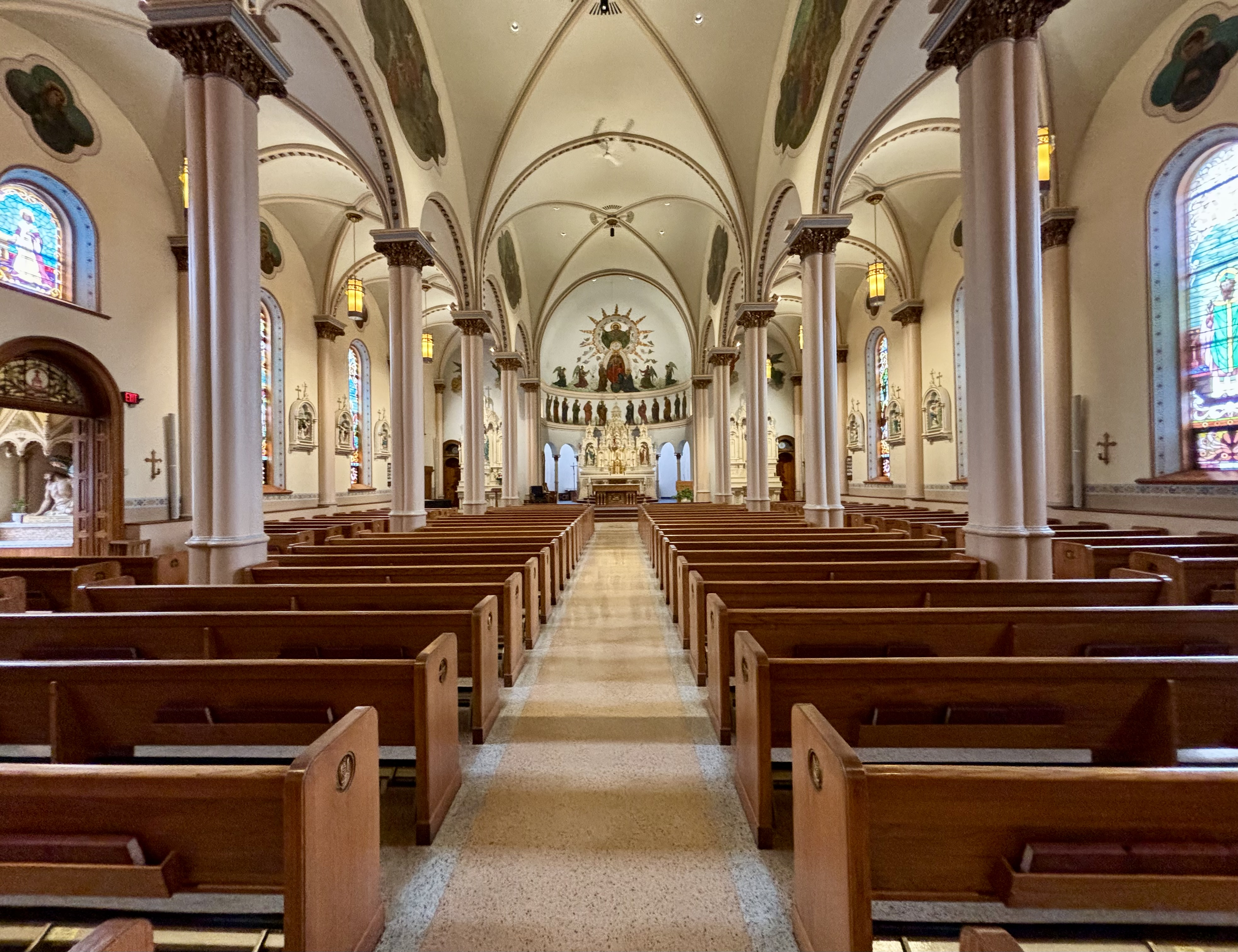
View toward the altar (2024)

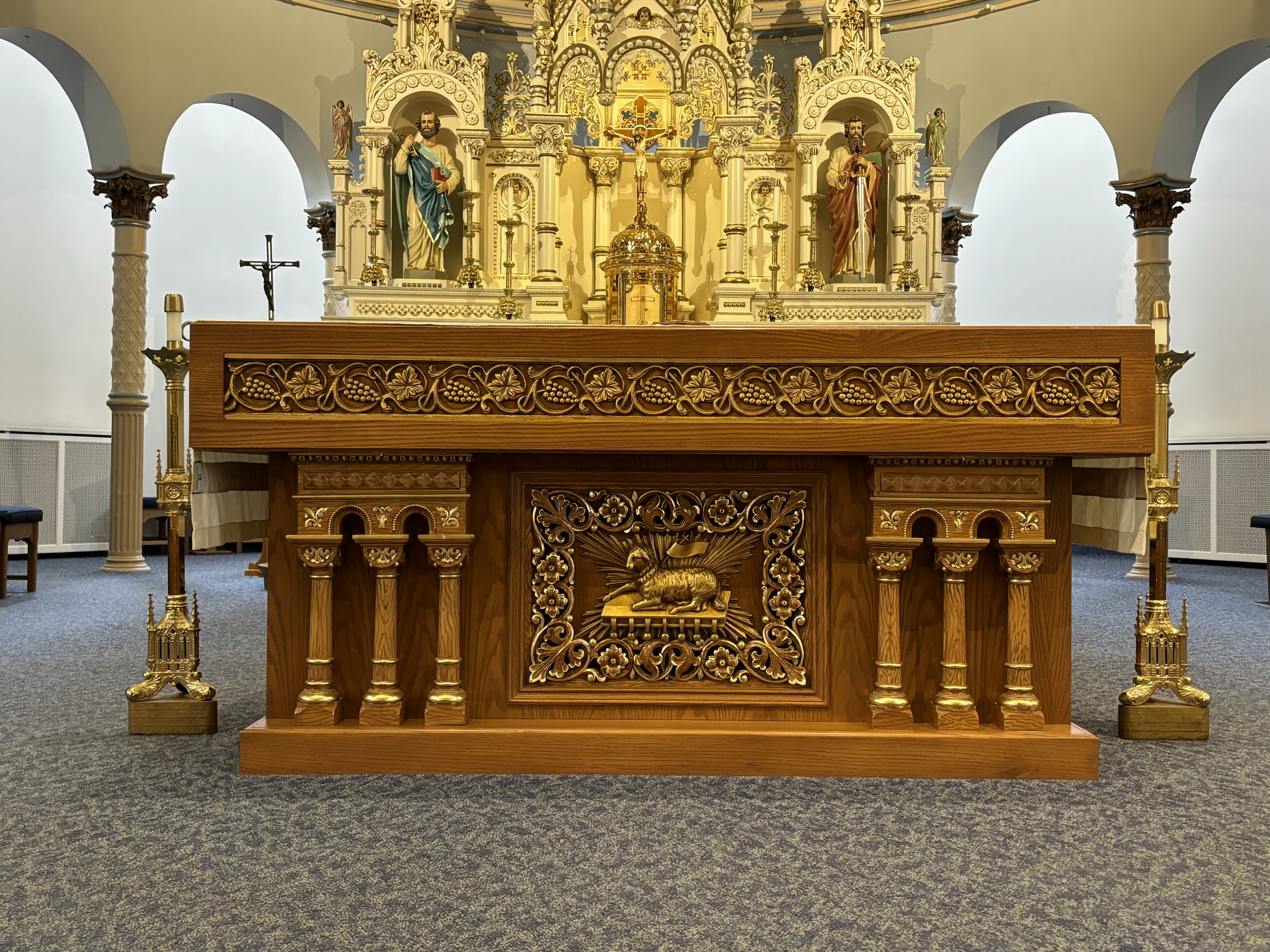
Altar (2024)

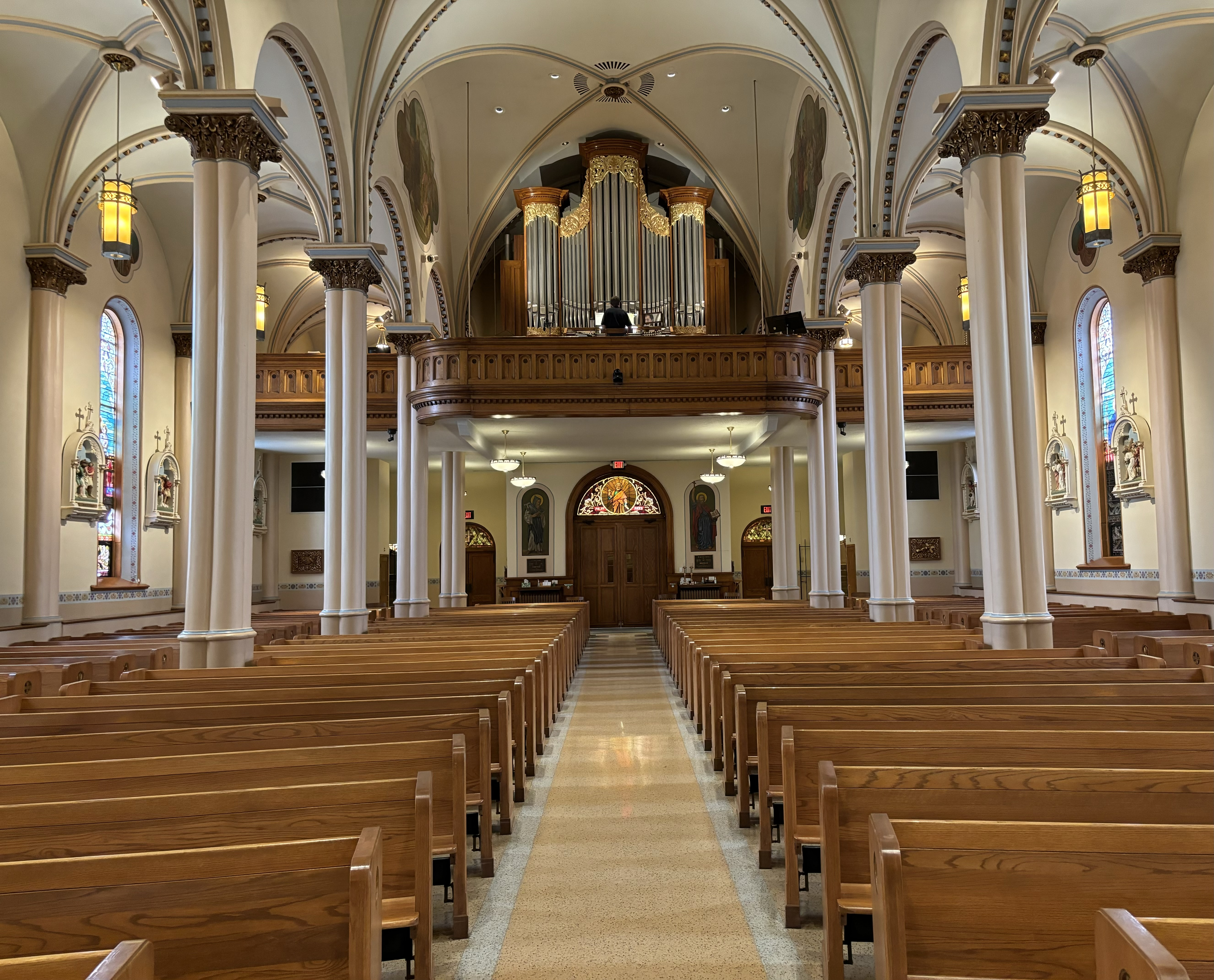
View toward the gallery (2024)

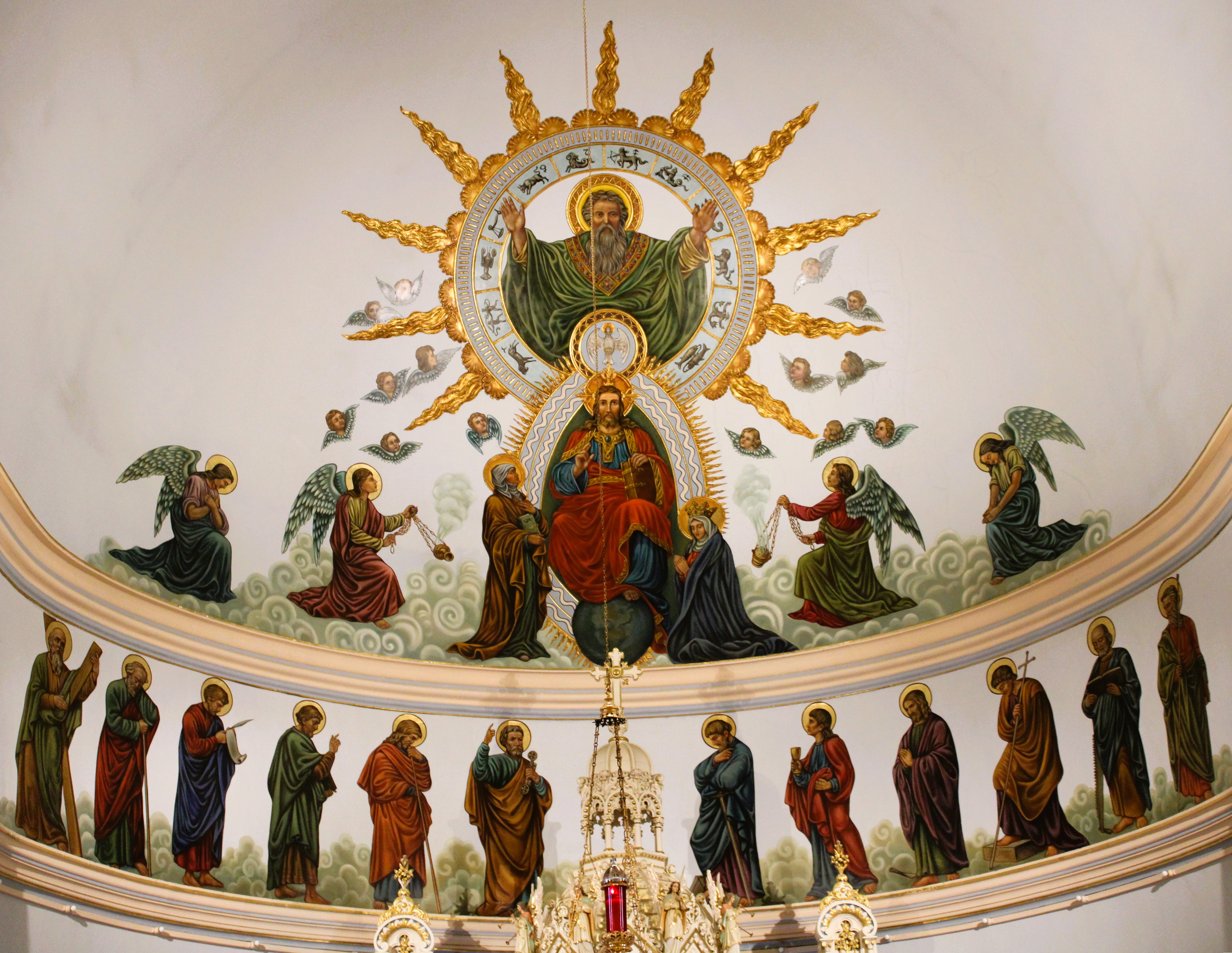
Holy Trinity mural (2024)

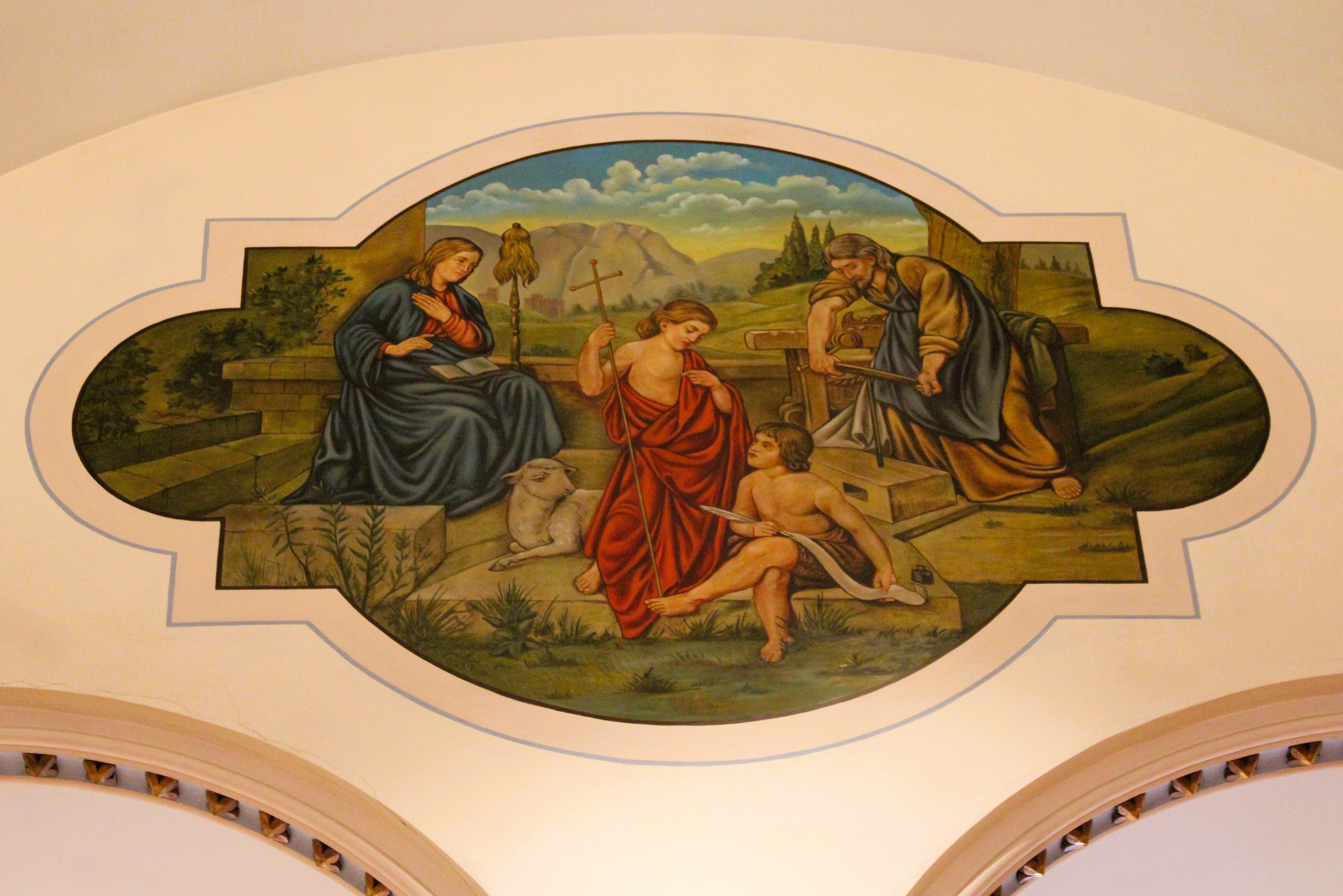
Fresco of the Holy Family and St. John the Baptist (2024)

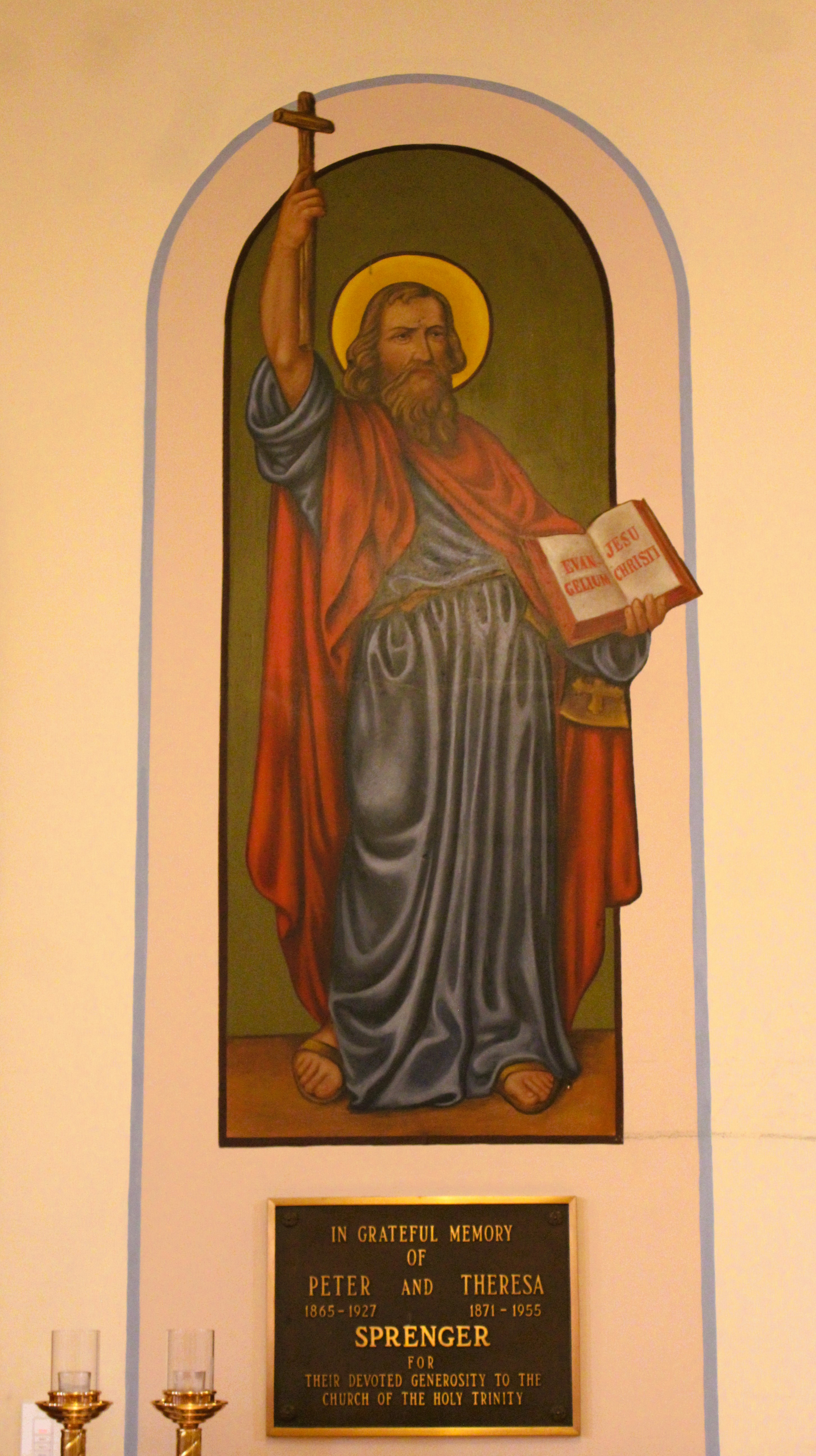
Statue of the Apostle Paul (2024)

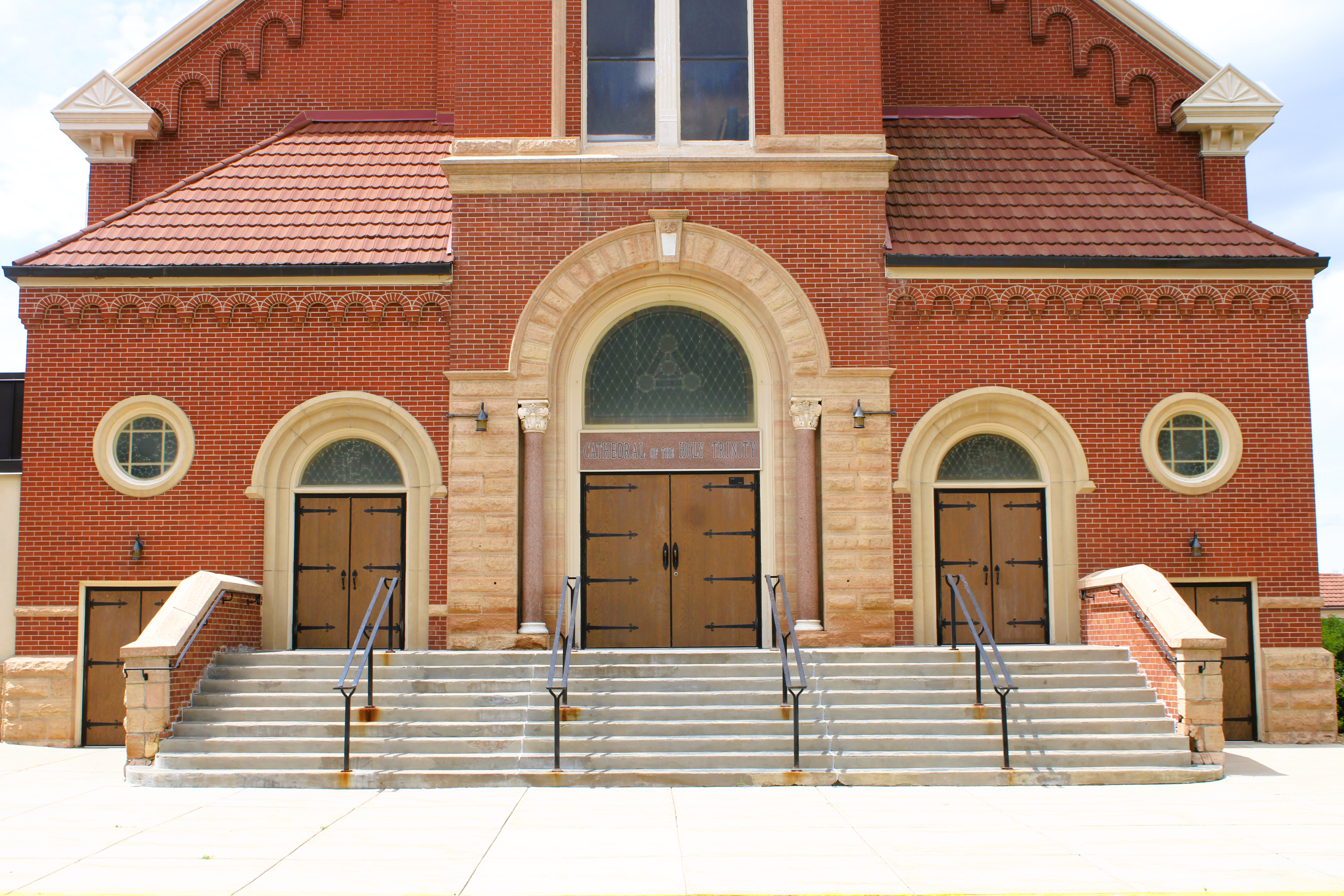
Front entrance (2024)

== See also ==
- List of Catholic cathedrals in the United States
- List of cathedrals in the United States
