= Raymond Alphonse Lucker =

American prelate (1927–2001)

His Excellency, The Most Reverend Raymond Alphonse Lucker
- Bishop of New Ulm; Titular Bishop of Meta
- See: New Ulm
- Installed: February 19, 1976
- Term ended: November 17, 2000
- Predecessor: Alphonse James Schladweiler
- Successor: John Clayton Nienstedt
- Other post: Auxiliary Bishop of St. Paul and Minneapolis (1971–76)

Orders
- Ordination: June 7, 1952 by James J. Byrne
- Consecration: September 8, 1971 by Luigi Raimondi

Personal details
- Born: February 24, 1927 Saint Paul, Minnesota, US
- Died: September 19, 2001 (aged 74) Saint Paul
- Education: St. Paul Seminary; Pontifical University of St. Thomas Aquinas; University of Minnesota

Raymond Alphonse Lucker (February 24, 1927 – September 19, 2001) was an American prelate of the Catholic Church. He served as bishop of the Diocese of New Ulm in Minnesota from 1976 to 2000. He previously served as an auxiliary bishop of the Archdiocese of St. Paul and Minneapolis in Minnesota from 1971 to 1976.

== Biography ==
=== Early life ===
Raymond Lucker was born in Saint Paul, Minnesota, the third of six children of Alphonse J. and Josephine Theresa (née Schiltgen) Lucker. His father, a railroad worker, died in 1940 at age 42, the day before Raymond began the eighth grade. His mother, who was the daughter of a farmer, later married Joseph Stephen Mayer in 1948. He spent many of his childhood summers working on his grandparents' farm east of the Twin Cities.

He received his early education at the parochial school of Sacred Heart Parish, and entered Nazareth Hall Preparatory Seminary in 1941. He then studied at St. Paul Seminary, where he earned a Bachelor of Arts degree in philosophy (1948) and a Master of Arts degree in Church history (1952). He earned his master's degree with a thesis entitled: "Some Aspects of the Life of Thomas Langdon Grace, Second Bishop of St. Paul".

=== Priesthood ===
On June 7, 1952, Lucker was ordained to the priesthood for the Archdiocese of Saint Paul by Bishop James J. Byrne at the Cathedral of St. Paul. His first assignment was as assistant director of the archdiocese's Office of the Confraternity of Christian Doctrine. He served as assistant director until 1958, when he was named director of the office and professor of catechetics at St. Paul Seminary, serving in both positions until 1969.

In 1964, Lucker was sent to further his studies at the Pontifical University of St. Thomas Aquinas in Rome, where he earned a Doctor of Sacred Theology degree in 1966 with a thesis titled "The Aims of Religious Education in the Early Church and in the American Catechetical Movement". During his studies in Rome, he participated in the Second Vatican Council.

Following his return to Minnesota, Lucker served as superintendent of education for the archdiocese from 1966 to 1969. He received a Ph.D. in Education ("Some Presuppositions of Released Time") from the University of Minnesota in 1969. From 1969 to 1971, he worked in Washington, D.C. as the director of the Department of Education for the newly created United States Catholic Conference. During his tenure as director, he was named an honorary prelate by Pope Paul VI.

=== Auxiliary Bishop of St. Paul and Minneapolis ===
On July 12, 1971, Lucker was appointed auxiliary bishop of St. Paul and Minneapolis and titular bishop of Meta by Paul VI. He received his episcopal consecration on September 8, 1971, at the Cathedral of St. Paul from Archbishop Luigi Raimondi, with Archbishops Leo Binz and Leo Byrne serving as co-consecrators. In addition to his episcopal duties, he served as pastor of St. Austin's Parish in Minneapolis (1971–1974) and of Assumption Parish in St. Paul (1974–1976). While at Assumption Parish, he also served as director of the archdiocesan Liturgy Office.

=== Bishop of New Ulm ===
Lucker was named the second bishop of New Ulm on December 23, 1975, by Paul VI. His installation took place on February 19, 1976, at the Cathedral of the Holy Trinity in New Ulm, Minnesota.

During his 25-year tenure, Lucker earned a reputation as one of the most progressive Catholic bishops in the country. He was a pioneer in the national movement to reform Catholic education, helping the nationwide development of the Confraternity of Christian Doctrine and the National Conference of Diocesan Directors.

In 1989, Lucker engaged in a public disagreement with Cardinals Joseph Ratzinger (later Pope Benedict XVI) and Cardinal John J. O'Connor over the state of catechesis in the United States. During a meeting in Rome, Ratzinger allegedly said, "The developments in catechesis in the post-conciliar period, to a large extent, [have] been turned over to the so-called professional. This, in turn, has led to an excess of experimentation...making it all the more difficult to recognize that of the Gospel." O'Connor was reported to have said, "Basically confusion and diversity in catechetical materials have left an entire generation in a state of ambiguity. Some bishops are bludgeoned into compliance...and some bishops are browbeaten by directors of religious education so that bishops' feelings of inadequacy are heightened." In response, Lucker declared,

"If what the two cardinals say is true, then there is no catechetical renewal and we have to go back to the '50s. Or, if it is not true, then we have an enormous communications problem with our own bishops and with many other people."

The following year, he again criticized Ratzinger after the Vatican announced it would give the world's bishops five months to express concerns about its draft of a universal catechism for adults; Lucker said, "A textbook is not the center and the focus of catechesis." Lucker was also a harsh critic of the Vatican's bureaucracies, once saying, "I'm convinced that the biggest obstacle to the renewal of the Church is the Roman Curia."

Lucker also served as episcopal moderator of Pax Christi; as a member of the Catholic Theological Society of America; and as a member of the National Conference of Catholic Bishops' Administrative Committee and the committees on Latin America, Evangelization, Diaconate, Laity, Catechetical Directory, and Charismatic Renewal.

=== Retirement and legacy ===
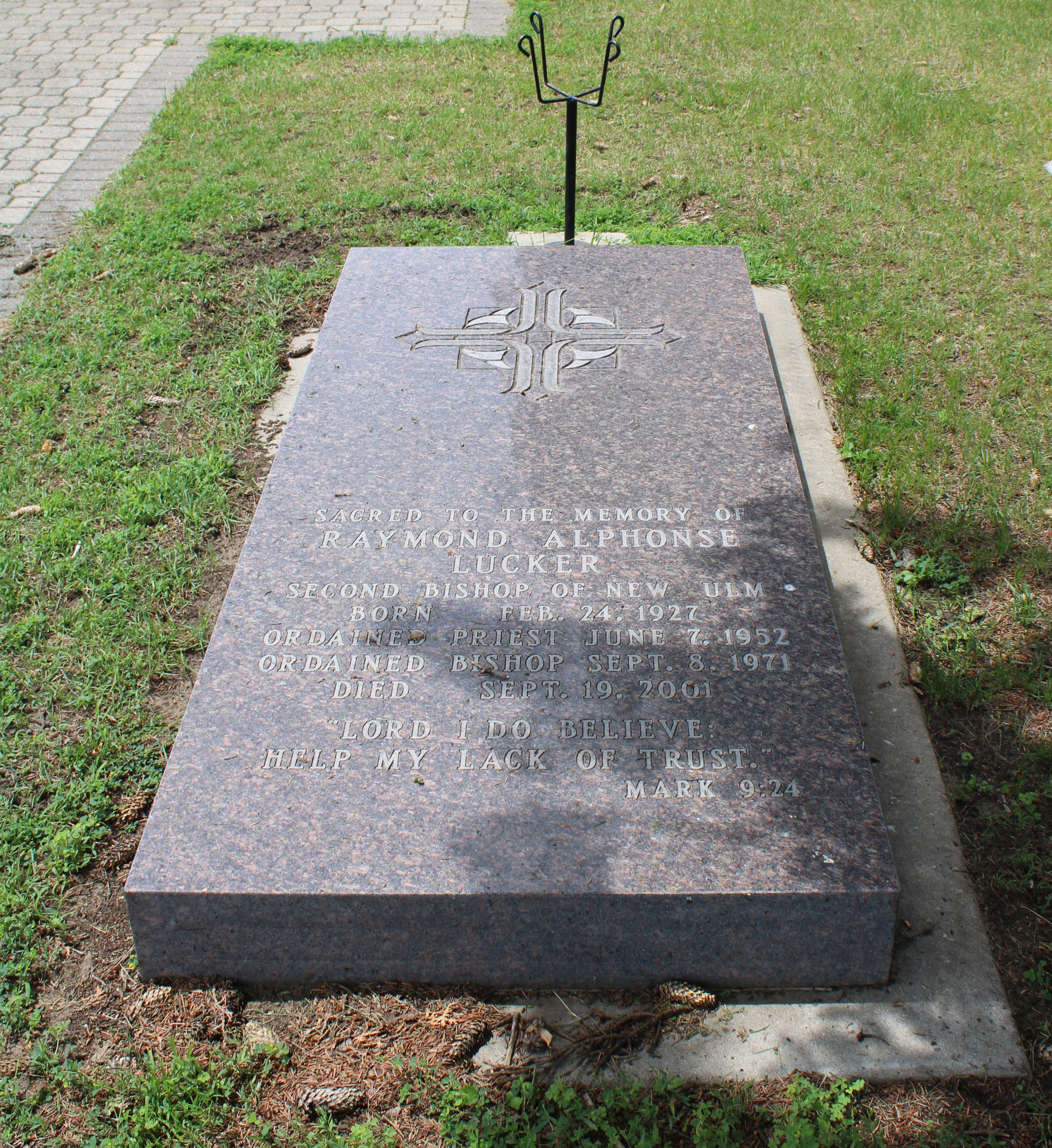
Bishop Lucker's grave

On November 17, 2000, Pope John Paul II accepted Lucker's resignation as bishop of New Ulm after he was diagnosed with melanoma. Raymond Lucker died at Our Lady of Good Counsel Home in St. Paul on September 18, 2001, at age 74. He is buried at New Ulm Catholic Cemetery.

== Viewpoints ==
=== Ordination of women and birth control ===
Lucker expressed his support of birth control and the ordination of women. On the particular issue of women's ordination, he once remarked, "Basically, the Church's argument against the ordination of women—which has been taught for at least 800 years—is that women are inferior. But we don't believe that women are inferior anymore. There is a lack of argumentation for the teaching. And the argumentation is weak."

=== Clerical celibacy ===
Lucker also opposed clerical celibacy, supporting the ordination of married men to help alleviate the worldwide shortage of priests.

Catholic Church titles
Preceded by Alphonse James Schladweiler	Bishop of New Ulm; February 19, 1976 – November 17, 2000	Succeeded by John Clayton Nienstedt
