= Lee A. Piché =

Roman Catholic bishop (born 1958)

His Excellency, The Most Reverend Lee Anthony Piché
- Auxiliary Bishop Emeritus of Saint Paul and Minneapolis; Titular Bishop of Tamata
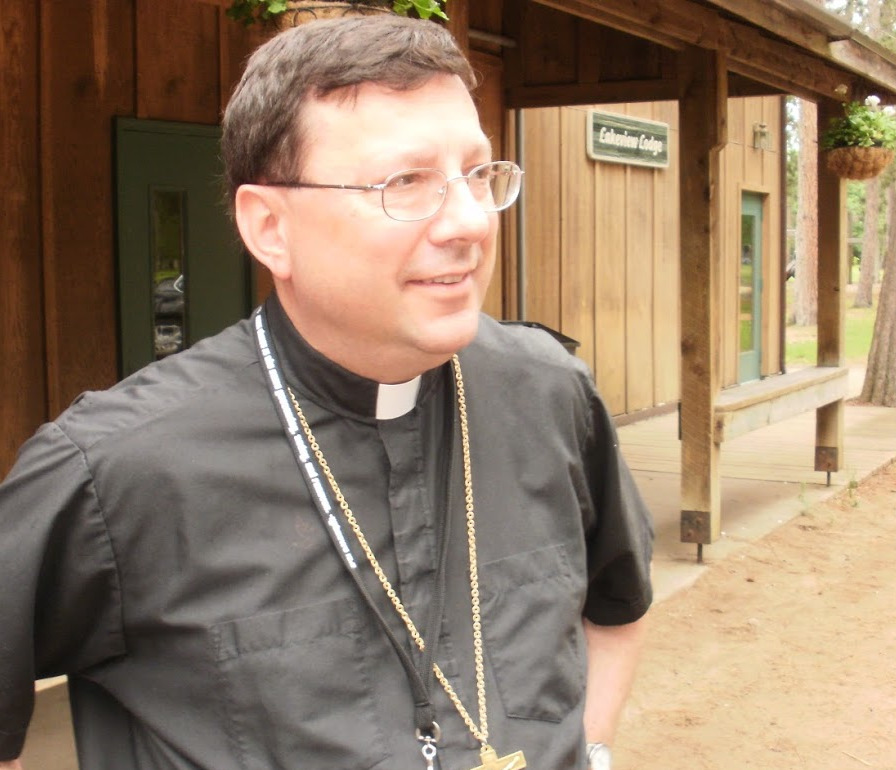
- Archdiocese: Saint Paul and Minneapolis
- Appointed: May 27, 2009
- Installed: June 29, 2009
- Retired: June 15, 2015
- Other post: Titular Bishop of Tamata

Orders
- Ordination: May 26, 1984 by John Robert Roach
- Consecration: June 29, 2009 by John Clayton Nienstedt, Harry Joseph Flynn, and John M. LeVoir

Personal details
- Born: May 8, 1958 (age 68) Minneapolis, Minnesota, US
- Motto: Lucerna pedi meo verbum tuum (Your word is a lamp to my feet)

Styles of Lee Anthony Piché
- Reference style: His Excellency; The Most Reverend
- Spoken style: Your Excellency
- Religious style: Bishop

Lee Anthony Piché (born May 8, 1958) is an American prelate of the Roman Catholic Church. He served as an auxiliary bishop of the Archdiocese of St. Paul and Minneapolis in Minnesota beginning in 2009, resigned from public ministry in 2015, and returned to ministry in 2023 as vicar for retired priests.

== Biography ==
=== Early life and education ===
The eldest of seven children, Lee Piché was born on May 8, 1958, in Minneapolis, Minnesota, to LeRoy and Cecilia Piché. He attended Irondale High School in New Brighton, Minnesota and the University of St. Thomas in St. Paul. He studied at St. Paul Seminary in St. Paul, where he obtained a Master of Theology degree.

=== Ordination and ministry ===
Piché was ordained into the priesthood by Archbishop John Roach for the Archdiocese of St. Paul and Minneapolis on May 26, 1984. He then served as associate pastor at St. Mark's Parish in St. Paul, Minnesota, until 1987, when he joined the faculty of the University of St. Thomas in St. Paul. Piché then furthered his studies at St. Joseph Seminary in Princeton, New Jersey (1987–1988), and at Columbia University in New York City, earning a Master of Philosophy degree in 1994.

From 1994 to 1999, Piché taught undergraduate philosophy at the University of St. Thomas. He served as pastor of St. Joseph Parish in West St. Paul, Minnesota, (1999–2005), and of All Saints Parish in Lakeville, Minnesota (2005–2008). From 2000 to 2008, Piché served as chairman of the Archdiocesan Commission for Ecumenism and Interreligious Affairs. In June 2008, he was named pastor of St. Andrew Parish in St. Paul as well as vicar general and moderator of the curia for the archdiocese.

=== Auxiliary Bishop of St. Paul and Minneapolis ===
On May 27, 2009, Piché was appointed as an auxiliary bishop of St. Paul and Minneapolis and titular bishop of Tamata by Pope Benedict XVI. He received his episcopal consecration on June 29, 2009, from Archbishop John Nienstedt, with Archbishop Harry Flynn and Bishop John LeVoir serving as co-consecrators, at the Cathedral of St. Paul in St. Paul.

=== Resignation ===
The Vatican announced on June 15, 2015, that Pope Francis had accepted Piché's resignation as auxiliary bishop of Saint Paul-Minneapolis. The Vatican statement cited the provision of canon law that allows a bishop to resign when some "grave reason" makes it impossible to continue to fulfill his duties.

Ten days before his retirement, criminal and civil charges were filed against the archdiocese alleging that warning signs of abuse against minors were willingly ignored. Additionally, it was alleged that Piché was informed of a priest going camping and sharing a bed with minor boys and did not act on this information, allegations that Piché denied.

=== Vicar for Retired Priests ===
In July 2023, Piché returned from retirement to serve as vicar for retired priests at the request of Archbishop Bernard Hebda. The role does not involve public duties.

== See also ==
- Catholic Church hierarchy
- Catholic Church in the United States
- Historical list of the Catholic bishops of the United States
- List of the Catholic bishops of the United States
- Lists of patriarchs, archbishops, and bishops

== Episcopal succession ==
Catholic Church titles
Preceded by –	Auxiliary Bishop of Saint Paul and Minneapolis; May 27, 2009–June 15, 2015	Succeeded by –
