= John Clayton Nienstedt =

American Catholic prelate (born 1947)

His Excellency, The Most Reverend John Clayton Nienstedt
- Archbishop Emeritus of Saint Paul and Minneapolis
- Church: Catholic
- Archdiocese: Saint Paul and Minneapolis
- Appointed: April 24, 2007 (Coadjutor)
- Installed: May 2, 2008
- Retired: June 15, 2015
- Predecessor: Harry Flynn
- Successor: Bernard Hebda
- Previous posts: Coadjutor Archbishop of Saint Paul and Minneapolis (2007‍–‍2008); Bishop of New Ulm (2001‍–‍2007); Auxiliary Bishop of Detroit (1996‍–‍2001); Titular Bishop of Alton (1996‍–‍2001)

Orders
- Ordination: July 27, 1974 by Joseph Leopold Imesch
- Consecration: July 9, 1996 by Adam Maida, James Aloysius Hickey, Edmund Szoka

Personal details
- Born: March 18, 1947 (age 79) Detroit, Michigan, US
- Residence: Napa Valley, California, US
- Education: Sacred Heart Major Seminary (B.A.); Pontifical Gregorian University (S.T.B.); Pontifical Institute of Saint Alphonsus (S.T.L., S.T.D.)
- Motto: Ut omnes unum sint (Latin for 'That all may be one')

Styles of John Clayton Nienstedt
- Reference style: His Excellency; The Most Reverend
- Spoken style: Your Excellency
- Religious style: Archbishop

Ordination history of John Clayton Nienstedt
History
Episcopal consecration
- Principal consecrator: Adam Joseph Maida
- Co-consecrators: James Aloysius Cardinal Hickey, Edmund Casimir Szoka
Episcopal succession
Bishops consecrated by John Clayton Nienstedt as principal consecrator
- John Marvin LeVoir: December 15, 2008
- Lee Anthony Piché: June 29, 2009
- Paul David Sirba: December 14, 2009
- Robert Dwayne Gruss: July 28, 2011
- David Dennis Kagan: November 30, 2011
- John Thomas Folda: June 19, 2013
- Andrew H. Cozzens: December 9, 2013

John Clayton Nienstedt (born March 18, 1947) is an American prelate of the Catholic Church who served as archbishop of St. Paul and Minneapolis in Minnesota from 2008 until his resignation in 2015 due to his role in the clergy child sex abuse crisis.

Nienstedt previously served as bishop of New Ulm in Minnesota from 2001 to 2007 and as an auxiliary bishop of the Archdiocese of Detroit in Michigan from 1996 to 2001. Nienstedt asked for early retirement as archbishop of St. Paul and Minneapolis after a local prosecutor announced plans to indict the archdiocese due to its failure to protect children from sexual abuse by its priests.

== Biography ==
=== Early life ===
John Nienstedt was born pm March 18, 1947, in Detroit, Michigan, to John C. and Elizabeth S. (née Kennedy) Nienstedt. The second oldest of six children, he has two brothers, Richard and Michael, and three sisters, Barbara, Mary, and Corinne.

Nienstedt graduated in 1969 from Sacred Heart Major Seminary in Detroit with Bachelor of Arts degree. He then studied Pontifical Gregorian University in Rome, where he earned a Bachelor of Sacred Theology degree in 1972. On April 29, 1972, Nienstedt was ordained a deacon at the Pontifical North American College.

=== Priesthood ===
Nienstedt was ordained a priest at Sacred Heart Church in Detroit by Bishop Joseph Imesch on July 27, 1974, for the Archdiocese of Detroit. After his ordination, the archdiocese assigned Nienstadt as an associate pastor at Guardian Angels Parish in Clawson, Michigan. In 1978, he traveled to Rome to attend the Pontifical Institute of St. Alphonsus. He received a Licentiate of Sacred Theology there in 1977. After returning to Detroit in 1977, Nienstedt became priest-secretary to Cardinal John Dearden and a part-time professor of moral theology at St. John's Provincial Seminary in Plymouth, Michigan.

Nienstedt accompanied Cardinal Dearden to the August 1978 papal conclave in Rome, where he met the future Pope John Paul II. Nienstedt was also a weekend associate pastor at St. Fabian's Parish in Farmington Hills and at Our Lady of Sorrows Parish in Farmington, both in Michigan. He became vicar general for the archdiocese in 1979.

In 1980, Nienstedt returned to Rome, where he was assigned to the English desk of the Vatican Secretariat of State. While in Rome, he also served as a chaplain at Bambino Gesù Hospital (1980–1983) and to the Brothers of Holy Cross (1981–1984). Nienstedt earned a Doctorate in Sacred Theology from St. Alphonsus in 1985; his doctoral thesis was entitled, "Human Life in a Test-tube; the Moral Dimension of In Vitro Fertilization and Embryo transfer."

In early 1986, Nienstedt came back to Michigan. He was named temporary assistant pastor at St. Regis Parish in Birmingham, Michigan, and adjunct professor of moral theology at SS. Cyril and Methodius Seminary in Orchard Lake, Michigan. He was named pastor of St. Patrick's Parish in Union Lake, Michigan in July that year. In 1987, Nienstedt was appointed to reorganize Sacred Heart Seminary. He became its rector in 1988. The Vatican named him as an honorary prelate of his holiness in 1990. The archdiocese in 1994 appointed him as pastor of the National Shrine of the Little Flower in Royal Oak, Michigan.

=== Auxiliary Bishop of Detroit ===
On June 12, 1996, Nienstedt was appointed auxiliary bishop of Detroit and titular bishop of Alton by John Paul II. He received his episcopal consecration at the Cathedral of the Most Blessed Sacrament in Detroit on July 9, 1996, from Cardinal Adam Maida, with Cardinals James Hickey and Edmund Szoka serving as co-consecrators. He selected as his episcopal motto: Ut Omnes Unum Sint, 'That All May Be One' from John 17:21.

As an auxiliary bishop, Nienstedt served as episcopal vicar for the Dearborn, Downriver, Monroe, Northwest Wayne, Southland, and Western Wayne vicariates.

=== Bishop of New Ulm ===
Nienstedt was named as the third bishop of New Ulm on June 12, 2001, and was installed on August 6. He denounced the more progressive views of his predecessor, Bishop Raymond Lucker. Nienstedt told Catholics in the archdiocese not to read Lucker's book as representing Catholic doctrine and asked the United States Conference of Catholic Bishops (USCCB) to assess the validity of Lucker's views.

During his tenure at the USCCB, Nienstedt chaired the Committee on Priestly Formation and was a member of the Ad Hoc Committee on Health Care Issues and the Church. Both of Nienstedt's parents died in the course of six weeks in the winter of 2007.

=== Coadjutor Archbishop and Archbishop of St. Paul and Minneapolis ===
On April 24, 2007, Pope Benedict XVI appointed Nienstedt as coadjutor archbishop of St. Paul and Minneapolis, the designated successor to Archbishop Harry Flynn.

When the pope accepted Flynn's retirement on May 2, 2008, Nienstedt automatically succeeded him as the eighth archbishop of St. Paul and Minneapolis. Nienstedt received the pallium, a vestment worn by metropolitan bishops, from Benedict XVI in St. Peter's Basilica on June 29, 2008. Shortly after becoming archbishop, Nienstedt discontinued the gay pride prayer service held at St. Joan of Arc Church in Minneapolis. He declined numerous invitations to attend the 2008 Republican National Convention, which was held in St. Paul.

In October 2010, Nienstedt announced a strategic plan that called for the merging of 21 parishes into 14 neighboring parishes. These and two later mergers reduced the number of parishes in the archdiocese from 213 in October 2010 to 188 in July 2013.

== Abuse controversy ==
=== Personal misconduct allegations against Nienstedt ===
The archdiocese announced on December 17, 2013, that Nienstedt had voluntarily "stepped aside from all public ministry". The day before, Ramsey County authorities launched an investigation into an allegation that in 2009 Nienstedt had touched a boy on the buttocks. This incident allegedly happened during a photo session with the boy after a confirmation ceremony. After receiving the complaint, the archdiocese encouraged the young man to contact the police. Nienstedt maintained that this allegation was "absolutely and entirely false."

In February 2014, with Nienstedt's approval, the archdiocese hired an outside law firm to investigate allegations of sexual misconduct against seminarians and other young men. The allegations were initiated by Jennifer Haselberger, the archdiocesan canon law official. On March 11, 2014, Ramsey County officials announced they had concluded an "intensive investigation" of the touching allegation and would not file charges against Nienstedt, citing insufficient evidence. Nienstedt immediately announced his return to public ministry. In July 2014, when the archdiocese revealed its investigation into charges against Nienstedt, he responded:

I have never engaged in sexual misconduct and certainly have not made any sexual advances toward anyone. ... The allegations do not involve minors or lay members of the faithful, and they do not implicate any kind of illegal or criminal behavior.

=== Handling of sexual abuse allegations against priests ===
Nienstedt was criticized in 2014 for the way "his diocese has dealt with sexually abusive priests". Nienstedt responded, writing in a diocesan publication that although "it is very clear that we did not handle all complaints the way we should have in the past ... I have never knowingly covered up clergy sexual abuse [and] I promise to make changes".

Six archdiocesan priests publicly criticized Nienstedt's handling of the allegations, with some calling for his resignation. Nienstedt said that he would only resign if the papal nuncio took action. In 2014, during a lawsuit against the archdiocese, Nienstedt testified about his knowledge of priests accused of child sexual abuse.

==== LaVan case ====
In an April 2, 2014, deposition, Nienstedt claimed to have been unaware until March 2014 that Reverend Kenneth LaVan was still in ministry. In 1988, the archdiocese had received accusations that LaVan had sexually assaulted a teenage girl and was guilty of "sexually exploiting" several women. His continued ministry was a violation of church policy.

Despite Nienstedt's denials, court documents showed that he had received several updates over the years on LaVan's pastoral work. Nienstedt received the last update on August 15, 2013, and afterwards approved LaVan's continued parish assignments. The documents also indicated that Nienstedt had socialized with LaVan as recently as June 2013, thanking him in a letter for a gift of bourbon.

==== Gustafson case ====
Nienstedt also testified in 2014 that he first learned of the criminal conviction of Reverend Gilbert Gustafson "during the last six months" and claimed to have little knowledge of him. Gustafson had been convicted in 1983 of sexually assaulting a boy in White Bear Lake, Minnesota over a period of several years; he was fined and spent several months in prison.

Minnesota Public Radio reported in October 2014 that LaLonne Murphy, a parish music director, had written to Nienstedt in 2008 about Gustafson's criminal record and his continued work with the archdiocese. Nienstedt responded to her in writing that he had no control over Gustafson as he was no longer a priest, which was not true. Gustafson had not been laicized.

On June 5, 2015, Ramsey County prosecutor John J. Choi announced that he was bringing criminal charges and initiating a civil suit against the archdiocese for failing to protect children from sexual abuse. Choi alleged "a disturbing institutional and systemic pattern of behavior committed by the highest levels of leadership of the Archdiocese of St. Paul and Minneapolis over the course of decades".

=== Resignation ===
Soon after Choi's 2015 announcement, Nienstedt submitted his resignation as archbishop of St. Paul and Minneapolis to the pope. Since Nienstedt was several years under the mandatory retirement age of 75 for archbishops, he invoked a provision of canon law that allows a bishop to resign when some "grave reason" makes it impossible for him to continue to fulfill his duties.

Pope Francis accepted Nienstedt's resignation on June 15, 2015. Nienstedt issued a statement that said he resigned "with a clear conscience knowing that my team and I have put in place solid protocols to ensure the protection of minors and vulnerable adults". Francis named Archbishop Bernard Hebda, coadjutor archbishop of the Archdiocese of Newark, to serve as the archdiocese's apostolic administrator; Hebda was appointed archbishop of St. Paul and Minneapolis on March 24, 2016.

=== After resignation ===
After his resignation as archbishop of St. Paul and Minneapolis, Nienstedt returned to Michigan, where he has a home on Lake Huron. In 2016, he served briefly as substitute priest in the Diocese of Kalamazoo, but quit after only a week due to objections from local parishioners in Battle Creek. Nienstedt moved again in 2016 to Napa Valley, California, where he worked as an independent contractor for the Napa Institute, editing conference proceedings for publication. He also participated in their annual conference. On August 15, 2018, the Institute announced that Nienstedt had "stepped aside" from his responsibilities, and that it was understood that the Institute had been advised that "there are no restrictions on Archbishop Nienstedt's ministry".

In July 2016, the Ramsey County attorney's office released documents related to its investigation. It asserted that Nienstedt had tried to quash the archdiocese's investigation which he has initiated once it identified further allegations against him. One document identified the Apostolic Nuncio to the United States, Archbishop Carlo Maria Vigano, as ordering the closing of the investigation.

In January 2024, the Vatican's Dicastery for the Doctrine of the Faith concluded its investigation and found it had insufficient evidence to determine that Nienstedt had violated Church law, but found he had acted "imprudently". Pope Francis imposed restrictions on Nienstedt, prohibiting him from exercising his public ministry or living in the ecclesiastical province of St. Paul and Minneapolis (Minnesota, North Dakota, and South Dakota). He was ordered not to exercise any ministry outside his home without the permission of both the local bishop and the Vatican's Dicastery for Bishops.

== Positions on public issues ==
=== Satan ===
In September 2013, Nienstedt said that Satan is behind sodomy, abortion, contraception, pornography and same-sex marriage.

=== LBGT rights ===
Nienstedt has described homosexuality as a "result of psychological trauma" that "must be understood in the context of other human disorders: envy, malice, greed, etc." In 2005, Nienstedt warned that the 2005 film Brokeback Mountain was part of a so-called agenda that "severs the connection between marriage and gender". He summarized the plot–"one man makes a pass at the other and within seconds the latter mounts the former in an act of wanton anal sex"–and called it "a story of lust gone bad".

In October 2012, Nienstedt used more than US$600,000 in archdiocesan funds to campaign for Minnesota Amendment 1, which would have banned same-sex marriage in the state. The initiative was defeated at the polls on November 6, 2012, by five percentage points. Nienstedt opposed legislation legalizing same-sex marriage, which became law on May 14, 2013.

=== Abortion ===
During the 2008 U.S. presidential election, Nienstedt criticized House Speaker Nancy Pelosi, saying she had a "misinterpretation on the question of when life begins" and that her "remarks underscore once again the need for Catholics, and especially Catholic politicians, to form their consciences according to the moral truths taught by the Catholic Church." He also criticized the proposed Freedom of Choice Act in the US Congress, saying, "It is hard to imagine a more radical piece of pro-abortion legislation." He opposes embryonic stem cell research involving discarded human embryo stem cell lines.

=== Euthanasia ===
In 2005, while discussing the Terri Schiavo right-to-die case, Nienstedt stated: "Her case demonstrates the disparity that exists in this country between laws and basic moral principles. While we cannot legislate morality, we ought not to be legislating immorality."

Catholic Church titles
Preceded by Harry Flynn	Archbishop of Saint Paul and Minneapolis; May 2, 2008 – June 15, 2015	Succeeded by Bernard Hebda
Preceded by Raymond Lucker	Bishop of New Ulm; August 6, 2001 – April 24, 2007	Succeeded by John M. LeVoir
Preceded by –	Auxiliary Bishop of Detroit; July 9, 1996 – August 6, 2001	Succeeded by –
