= Bethlehem Academy =

Private Catholic school in Minnesota, US

Location
- 105 Third Avenue SW; Faribault, (Rice County), Minnesota 55021-6039; United States; 44°17′19″N 93°16′21″W

Information
- Type: Private, Coeducational
- Religious affiliation: Roman Catholic
- Established: 1865
- NCES School ID: 00701072
- Principal: Tom Donlon
- Grades: 7–12
- Colors: Red and White
- Athletics conference: Gopher Conference
- Mascot: Cardinal
- Team name: Cardinals
- Accreditation: North Central Association of Colleges and Schools
- Newspaper: Bethlehem Star
- Yearbook: Veritas
- Website: bacards.org

Bethlehem Academy is a private, Roman Catholic high school. It was established in 1865 in Faribault, Minnesota by the Sisters of St Dominic. It is located in the Archdiocese of Saint Paul and Minneapolis. It serves 244 students from grades 6 to 12. It is the oldest Catholic high school in Minnesota.

== History ==
In 1865, the Murphy family left New York for California. En-route they stopped in Faribault, Minnesota due to the threat of conflict with Native Americans along the route. After most of the family died, Catherine Murphy's dying request was to provide for a Catholic education for the children. In response, Bethlehem Academy was founded by nuns from St Clara's Academy in Wisconsin.

The school opened inside the convent, then moved to a home in 1896. The bottom story consisted of four rooms, including the school room on the first floor with two dormitories and a chapel upstairs.

In 1874, a new site was purchased, and a new three-story brick building was opened on June 1, 1876. In 1900 the North wing was added, and a three-story South wing was opened in 1908.

== Athletics ==
Bethlehem Academy has a total of 7 Minnesota Class A Volleyball State Championships (2003, 2005, 2007, 2009, 2011, 2012, 2014). In 2012, the team was the Minnesota Class A State Runner up, losing 14–20 to Mahnomen High School in Prep Bowl XXXI.

In 2018, coach Franz Boelter was fired for mistreating athletes emotionally. At the time he had coached the volleyball team to seven state championships and was the ninth-winningest coach in Minnesota high school history.
