= Diocese of New Ulm =

Latin Catholic ecclesiastical jurisdiction in Minnesota, USA

Coordinates: 44°18′43″N 94°27′47″W

Diocese of New Ulm Dioecesis Novae Ulmae
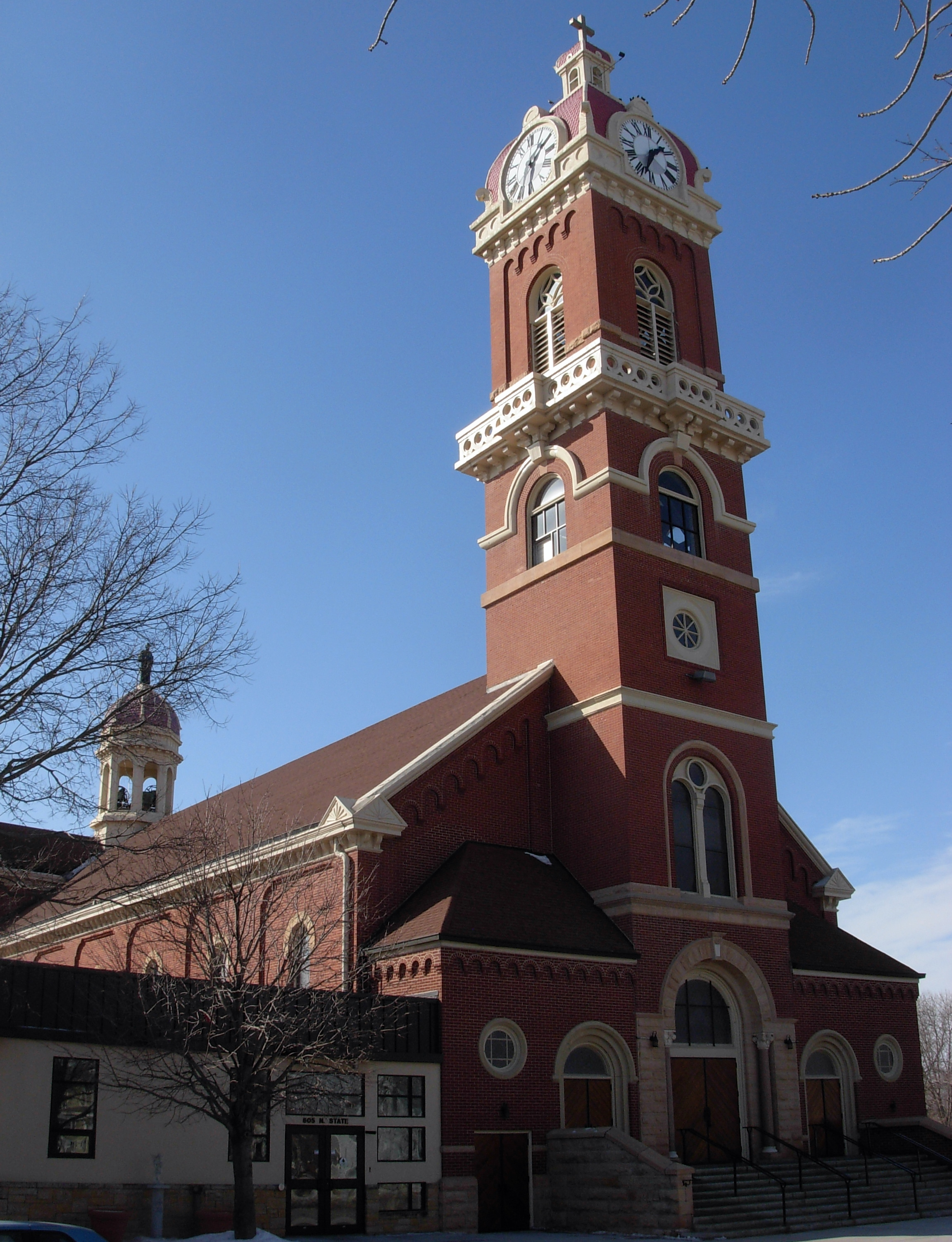
- Holy Trinity Cathedral

- Coat of arms

Location
- Country: United States
- Territory: 15 counties in western Minnesota
- Ecclesiastical province: Saint Paul and Minneapolis

Statistics
- Area: 9,863 sq mi (25,550 km^{2})
- Population: Total; Catholics: (as of 2024); 282,719; 42,068 (24.4%)
- Parishes: 55

Information
- Denomination: Catholic Church
- Sui iuris church: Latin Church
- Rite: Roman Rite
- Established: November 18, 1957 (68 years ago)
- Cathedral: Cathedral of the Holy Trinity
- Patron saint: Mary, Mother of God

Current leadership
- Pope: Leo XIV
- Bishop: Chad Zielinski
- Metropolitan Archbishop: Bernard Hebda
- Bishops emeritus: John M. LeVoir

Map

Website
- dnu.org

The Diocese of New Ulm (Latin: Dioecesis Novae Ulmae) is a diocese of the Catholic Church in western Minnesota in the United States. A suffragan diocese of the metropolitan Archdiocese of Saint Paul and Minneapolis, its cathedral parish is the Cathedral of the Holy Trinity in New Ulm.

== Territory ==
The Diocese of New Ulm encompasses fifteen counties in southwestern Minnesota. The largest town in the diocese is Willmar with 19,610 inhabitants.

== History ==
=== 1826 to 1957 ===
Central Minnesota went through several Catholic jurisdictions before the Vatican erected the Diocese of New Ulm:

- Diocese of Saint Louis (1826 to 1837)
- Diocese of Dubuque (1837 to 1850)
- Diocese of Saint Paul (1850 to 1875)

The New Ulm area would remain part of the Diocese of Saint Paul, followed by the Archdiocese of Saint Paul, for the next 107 years. The first Catholic church in the city of New Ulm, Holy Trinity, was started in 1857, but was demolished during the Dakota War of 1862. Another was built in 1871, then destroyed by a tornado ten years later. The current Holy Trinity church was completed in 1903.

=== 1957 to 2000 ===
On November 18, 1957, Pope Pius XII founded the Diocese of New Ulm, taking its territory from the Archdiocese of Saint Paul. The pope named Alphonse Schladweiler as the first bishop of New Ulm. During his 18-year tenure, he ordained 64 priests and organized St. Isadore Parish in Clarkfield (1960) and Lady of the Lakes Parish in Spicer (1962). In 1972, Schladweiler founded a diocesan newspaper, the Newsletter, and the diocesan pastoral council. He also established a mission in Guatemala, assuming responsibility for staffing a parish in San Lucas Tolimán. Schladweiler retired in 1975.

The second bishop of New Ulm was Raymond Lucker, named by Pope Paul VI in 1975. He placed one of his parishes under interdict until every member received psychological counseling. This happened after a religious sister, trained in New Age spirituality, replaced a crucifix in the church sanctuary with a "cosmic pillow." Lucker retired in 2000.

=== 2000 to present ===
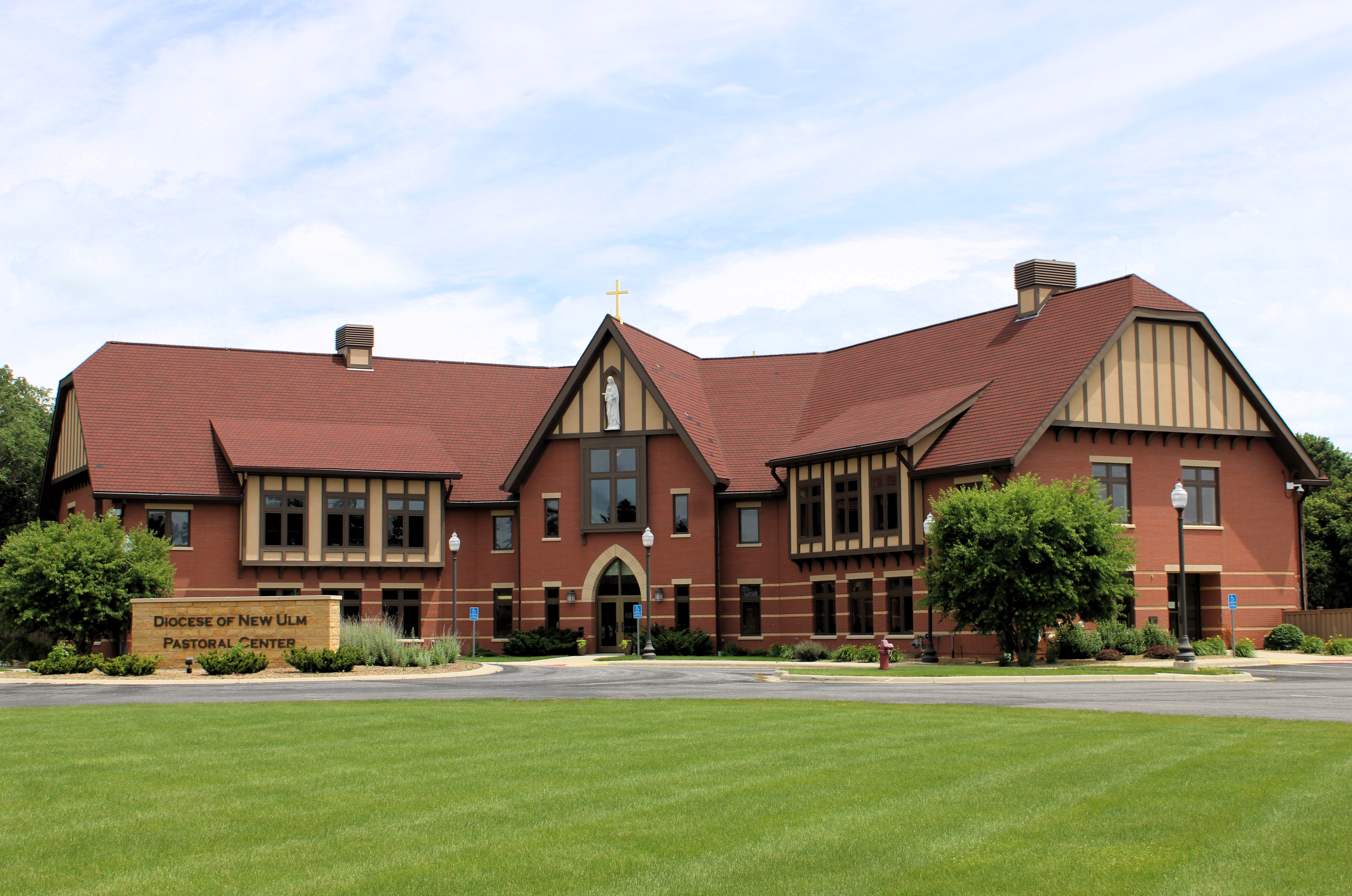
Pastoral Center, New Ulm, Minnesota (2024)

Pope John Paul II named Auxiliary Bishop John Nienstedt from the Archdiocese of Detroit as the third bishop of New Ulm in 2001. He told Catholics not to read Lucker's book on Catholic doctrine. Nienstadt became coadjutor archbishop of the Archdiocese of Saint Paul and Minneapolis in 2007.

Nienstedt's replacement in New Ulm was John M. LeVoir, named by Pope Benedict XVI in 2008. In 2017, the diocese filed for Chapter 11 Bankruptcy following numerous sexual abuse lawsuits against diocesan clergy. LeVoir retired in 2020.

As of 2023, the bishop of New Ulm is Chad Zielinski, formerly bishop of the Diocese of Fairbanks.

== Bishops ==
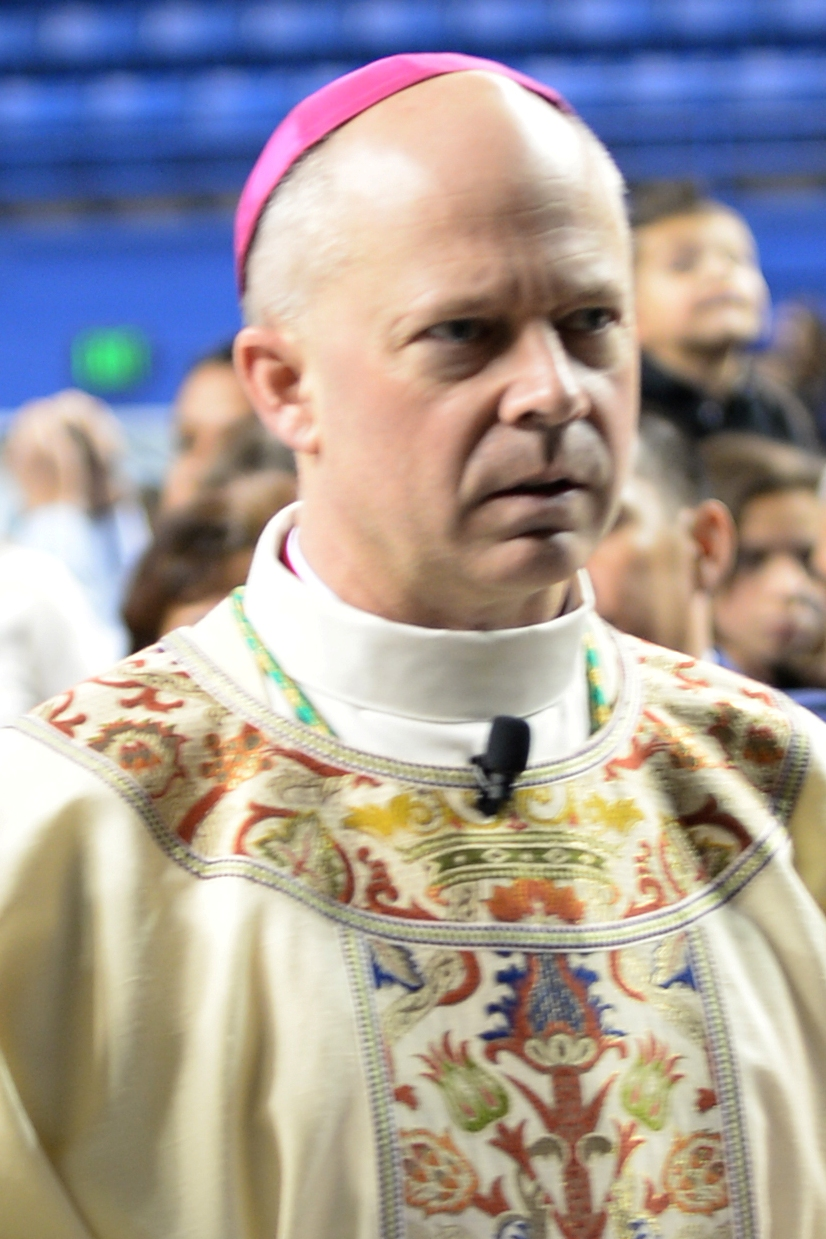
Bishop Zielinski (2014)

=== Bishops of New Ulm ===
- Alphonse James Schladweiler (1957–1975)
- Raymond Alphonse Lucker (1975–2000)
- John Clayton Nienstedt (2001–2007), later Archbishop of Saint Paul and Minneapolis
- John M. LeVoir (2008–2020)
- Chad Zielinski (2022-)

=== Other diocesan priest who became bishop ===
John Jeremiah McRaith, appointed Bishop of Owensboro in 1982.

== Education ==
As of 2025, the Diocese of New Ulm has three high schools and 13 primary schools, with an approximate enrollment of 1,800. The high schools include:

- Cathedral High School – New Ulm
- Holy Trinity High School – Winsted (PK to 12)
- St. Mary's High School – Sleepy Eye (PK to 12)
