= Neal Guggemos =

American football player (born 1964)

No. 41
- Positions: Defensive back, return specialist

Personal information
- Born: June 14, 1964 (age 62); Winsted, Minnesota, U.S.
- Listed height: 6 ft 0 in (1.83 m)
- Listed weight: 187 lb (85 kg)

Career information
- High school: Holy Trinity (Winsted, Minnesota)
- College: St. Thomas
- NFL draft: 1986: undrafted

Career history
- Minnesota Vikings (1986–1987); New York Giants (1988); Buffalo Bills (1989)*
- * Offseason or practice squad member only

Career NFL statistics
- Interceptions: 1
- Fumble recoveries: 6
- Return yards: 1,152
- Stats at Pro Football Reference

Neal Evan Guggemos (born June 14, 1964) is a former National Football League (NFL) defensive back and kick returner. He played for the Minnesota Vikings and New York Giants.

== Early life ==
Guggemos attended Holy Trinity High School in Winsted, Minnesota. As a four sport athlete, he earned 14 varsity letters and finished in 2nd place in the long jump and triple jump at the Minnesota State High School track and field meet.

== College career ==
After high school, Guggemos attended the University of St. Thomas in St. Paul, Minnesota, where he was a football News All-American in 1986 and a Kodak All-American defensive back in 1985 and 1986 for the Tommies. He finished his career with 25 interceptions, which at the time, was 3rd most all time in NCAA history, regardless of division.

He also helped lead the Tommies to the 1985 D-III Men's Indoor Track and Field Championship. He won 6 All-American awards in both the long jump and the triple jump during his collegiate track and field career.

== Professional career ==
Guggemos signed with the Minnesota Vikings as an undrafted free agent in 1986. He didn't see any action on the field until 1987, when he was 2nd in the league behind Paul Palmer with 808 return yards on 36 kick returns, averaging 22.4 yards per kick return. He also had an interceptions as a defensive back.

In 1988, Guggemos signed with the New York Giants. He had 17 kick returns for 344 yards.

In 1989, Guggemos signed with the Buffalo Bills, but was cut in the preseason.

== Personal life ==
Neal is married to Julie Guggemos. His older son, Nick, played wide receiver at Neal's alma mater, St. Thomas. He signed with the Seattle Seahawks on May 6, 2021, as a tight end. His younger son, Matt, played defensive back for the Minnesota Golden Gophers before transferring to St. Thomas. He also has a daughter, Alexa.
