= Holy Spirit Academy =

Location
- 1001 7th Street E Suite 1 Monticello, (Wright County), Minnesota 55362; United States
- Coordinates: 45°17′46″N 93°46′54″W

Information
- Type: Private
- Motto: Veritas et vita (Truth and life)
- Religious affiliation: Roman Catholic
- Patron saint: Fulton J. Sheen
- Established: 2014
- Headmaster: Andrew Lang
- Grades: 9–12
- Hours in school day: 8:00-3:15
- Colors: Dark Red and Gold
- Sports: Baseball, Basketball, Cross Country, Clay Target, Football, Golf, Softball, Swimming, Track and Field, Volleyball, Wrestling
- Team name: Irish
- Publication: Fulton's Fire
- Website: www.holyspiritacademy.org

Holy Spirit Academy is a private Catholic school in Monticello, Minnesota, in the United States. It is located in the Archdiocese of Saint Paul and Minneapolis.

Opened in 2014, Holy Spirit Academy has an integrated program and teaches in the Catholic intellectual tradition. It was formally recognized as a Catholic school on October 2, 2020, by the Archdiocese of St. Paul and Minneapolis. On May 25, 2023, the school was recognized in the Newman Guide, a society who acknowledges Catholic schools with strong commitment to the faith and academic excellence.

Students attend Mass Wednesday through Friday, have regular access to the sacrament of Reconciliation, and daily communal prayer, as well as Lauds each morning.
