= Leonard Philip Cowley =

Most Reverend Leonard Philip Cowley
- Auxiliary bishop of St. Paul and Minneapolis; Titular Bishop of Pertusa
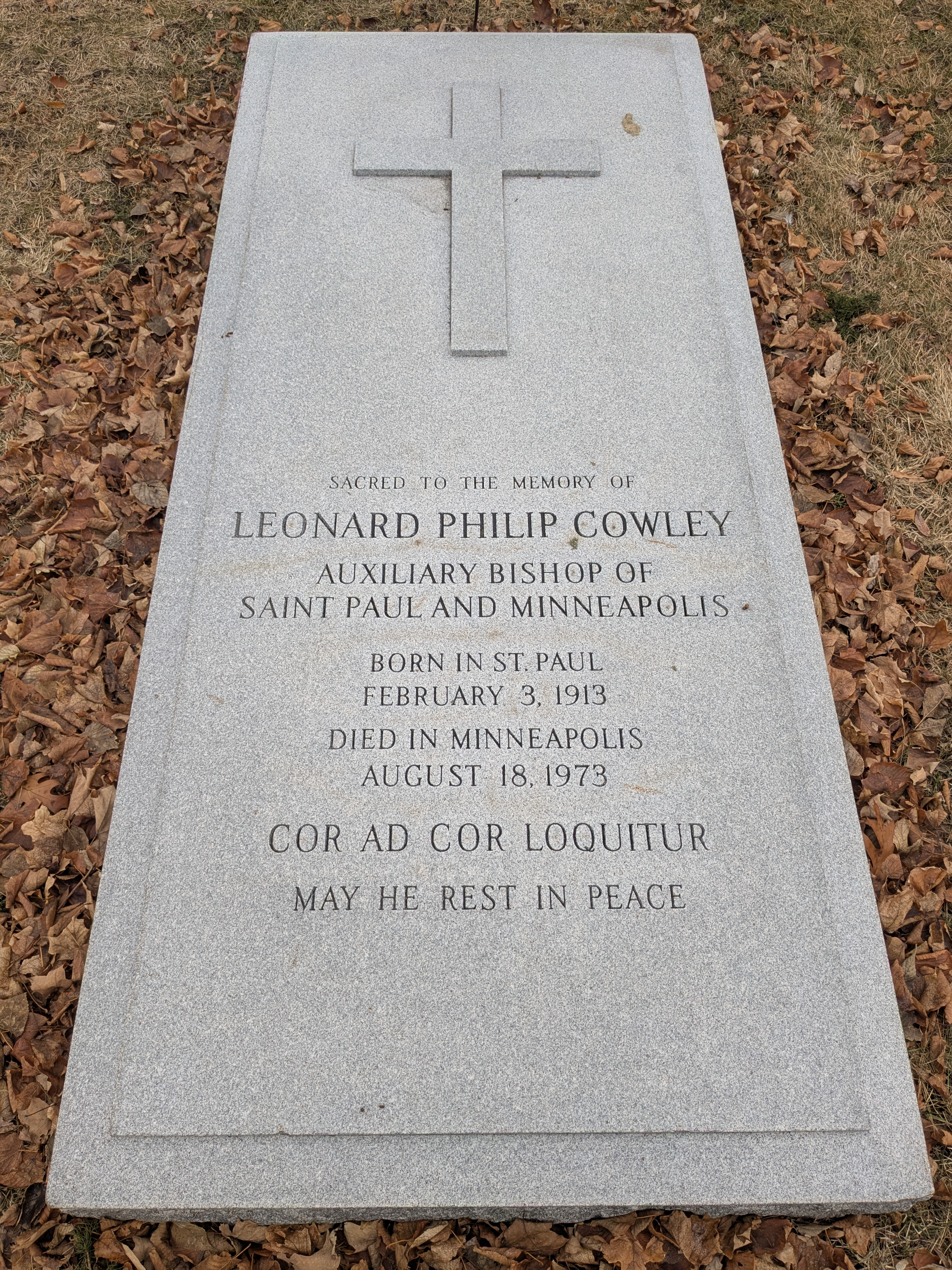
- The grave of Bishop Leonard Cowley at Resurrection Cemetery in Mendota Heights, Minnesota
- Church: Catholic Church

Orders
- Ordination: June 4, 1938
- Consecration: January 29, 1958

Personal details
- Born: February 3, 1913
- Died: August 19, 1973 (aged 60) St. Paul, Minnesota

Leo Philip Cowley (February 3, 1913 – August 18, 1973) was a Roman Catholic auxiliary bishop of the Archdiocese of Saint Paul and Minneapolis, Minnesota.

Born in Saint Paul, Minnesota, Cowley was ordained a priest for the then Saint Paul Archdiocese on June 4, 1938. On November 28, 1957, he was appointed the auxiliary bishop of the archdiocese and titular bishop of Pertusa. He died on August 18, 1973.
