= Holy Trinity High School (Winsted, Minnesota) =

Holy Trinity Parish and School
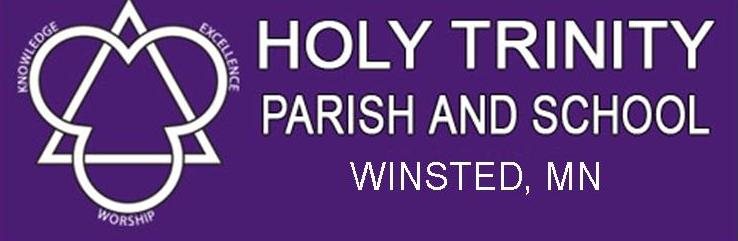
- Now Enrolling

Location
- 110 Winsted Avenue West; Winsted, McLeod, Minnesota 55395; United States; 44°57′55″N 94°2′49″W

Information
- Type: Private, Coeducational
- Motto: Partnering with God to create the whole person and student.
- Religious affiliation: Roman Catholic
- Established: 1883; 143 years ago
- Oversight: Diocese of New Ulm
- Principal: Anthony Biese
- Grades: Pre-K–12
- Colors: Purple and White
- Fight song: Minnesota Rouser
- Team name: LP/HT Bulldogs
- Accreditation: MNSAA
- Newspaper: Rouser
- Website: www.winstedholytrinity.org

Holy Trinity High School is a private, Roman Catholic high school in Winsted, Minnesota, United States. It is located in the Diocese of New Ulm.

== Background ==
Holy Trinity High School is part of the Holy Trinity Parish and School, which offers Catholic education from pre-kindergarten through 12th grade.

== Notable alumni ==
- Neal Guggemos – former NFL defensive back and kick returner, Minnesota Vikings and New York Giants
- Yvonne Selcer – former member of the Minnesota House of Representatives
- John Hoffman – current member of the Minnesota Senate
