= Alphonse James Schladweiler =

American prelate (1902–1996)

His Excellency, The Most Reverend Alphonse James Schladweiler
- Bishop of New Ulm
- Church: Roman Catholic Church
- See: Diocese of New Ulm
- Successor: Raymond Lucker

Orders
- Ordination: June 9, 1927 by Austin Dowling
- Consecration: January 29, 1958 by William O. Brady

Personal details
- Born: July 18, 1902 Milwaukee, Wisconsin, US
- Died: April 3, 1996 (aged 93) Sleepy Eye, Minnesota, US
- Education: St. Paul Seminary

Alphonse James Schladweiler (July 18, 1902—April 3, 1996) was an American prelate of the Roman Catholic Church. He served as the first bishop of the new Diocese of New Ulm in Minnesota from 1958 to 1975.

== Biography ==
=== Early life ===
Alphonse Schladweiler was born on July 18, 1902, in Milwaukee, Wisconsin, the third child of Mathias and Gertrude (née Schneider) Schladweiler. Following his mother's death in 1911, he and his family moved to Madison, Minnesota. Schladweiler attended the parochial school of St. Michael's Parish in Milwaukee, where he served as an altar boy. He studied at the Franciscan Minor Seminary in Teutopolis, Illinois, for six years before teaching Latin at St. Michael's High School. In 1923, he enrolled at St. Paul Seminary in St. Paul, Minnesota.

=== Priesthood ===
Schladweiler was ordained to the priesthood in St. Paul for the Archdiocese of Saint Paul by Archbishop Austin Dowling on June 9, 1927. After his ordination, Schladweiler served as curate at the following Minnesota parishes:

- Church of the Nativity in St. Paul
- Holy Trinity in New Ulm
- St. Michael's in St. Michael
- St. Bernard's in Cologne.

Schladweiler also served as chaplain of St. Mary's Hospital in Minneapolis. He was assigned as pastor at the following Minnesota parishes:

- St. Joseph's in Montevideo
- St. Michael's in Morgan
- Holy Rosary in North Mankato
- St. Agnes in St. Paul

In addition to his pastoral duties, Schladweiler served as prosynodal judge for the Archdiocese of St. Paul from 1954 to 1957. He was raised to the rank of domestic prelate in 1957.

=== Bishop of New Ulm ===
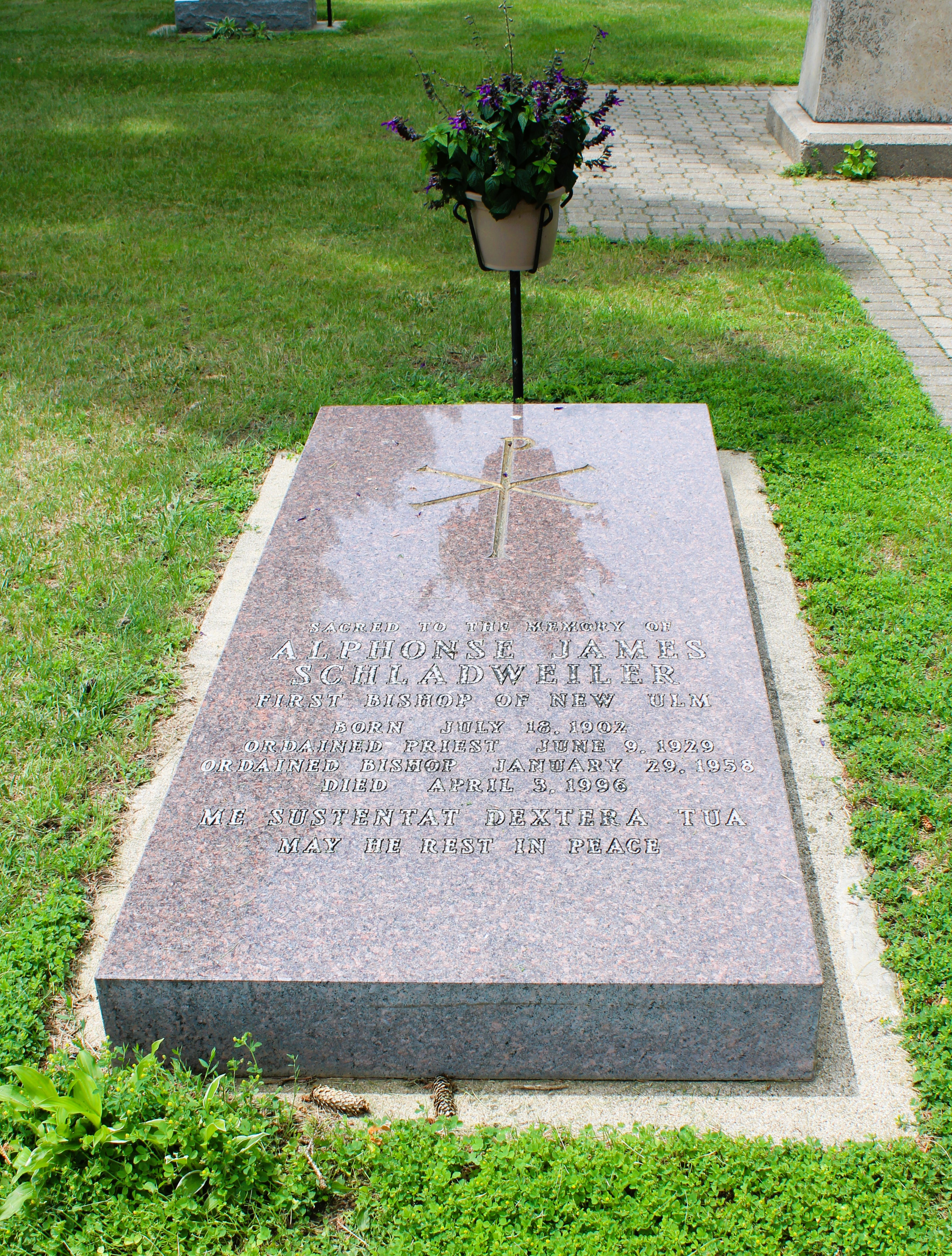
Bishop Schladweiler's grave

On November 28, 1957, Schladweiler was appointed the first bishop of the newly erected Diocese of New Ulm by Pope Pius XII. He received his episcopal consecration on January 29, 1958, from Archbishop William O. Brady, with Bishops James Byrne and Hilary Hacker serving as co-consecrators, in St. Paul at the Cathedral of St. Paul. His installation in New Ulm occurred at Holy Trinity Church on January 30, 1958.

Between 1962 and 1965, Schladweiler participated in all four sessions of the Second Vatican Council in Rome. Following the conclusion of the council, he worked to implement its reforms, including introducing English into the Mass. During his 18-year tenure, he ordained 64 priests and organized St. Isadore Parish in Clarkfield (1960) and Lady of the Lakes Parish in Spicer (1962). In 1972, Schladweiler founded a diocesan newspaper, Newsletter, and the diocesan pastoral council. He also established a mission in Guatemala, assuming responsibility for staffing a parish in San Lucas Tolimán.

=== Retirement and legacy ===
Pope Paul VI accepted Schladweiler's resignation as bishop of New Ulm on December 23, 1975. He was succeeded by Bishop Raymond Lucker, an auxiliary bishop of the Archdiocese of St. Paul and Minneapolis.

Schladweiler later moved to Divine Providence Community Home in Sleepy Eye, Minnesota, where he died on April 3, 1996, at age 93. He is buried in the New Ulm Catholic cemetery.

Catholic Church titles
Preceded by None	Bishop of New Ulm; January 29, 1958 – December 23, 1975	Succeeded by Raymond Lucker
