= John M. LeVoir =

His Excellency, The Most Reverend John Marvin LeVoir
- Bishop Emeritus of New Ulm
- Diocese: New Ulm
- Appointed: July 14, 2008
- Installed: September 14, 2008
- Retired: August 6, 2020
- Predecessor: John Clayton Nienstedt
- Successor: Chad Zielinski

Orders
- Ordination: May 30, 1981 by John R. Roach
- Consecration: September 15, 2008 by John Clayton Nienstedt, Frederick F. Campbell, and Peter F. Christensen

Personal details
- Born: February 7, 1946 (age 80) Minneapolis, Minnesota
- Denomination: Catholic
- Parents: Marvin A. LeVoir and Mary A. (Borys) LeVoir
- Education: University of St. Thomas, B.Sc in Chemistry (1968); University of Minnesota, B.S.B. in Accounting(1971); University of Minnesota, B.A. in History (1974); Saint Paul Seminary, M.A. in Theology (1981)
- Alma mater: Saint Paul Seminary
- Motto: Nolite Timere (Do not be afraid)

Styles of John Marvin LeVoir
- Reference style: His Excellency; The Most Reverend
- Spoken style: Your Excellency
- Religious style: Bishop

John Marvin LeVoir (born February 7, 1946) is an American prelate of the Roman Catholic Church who served as bishop of the Diocese of New Ulm in Minnesota from 2008 until 2020.

== Biography ==
=== Early years ===
John LeVoir was born on February 7, 1946, to Marvin and Mary (b. 1915) LeVoir in Minneapolis, Minnesota. He has two brothers, Frederick and Paul, and a sister, Mary Ellen. John LeVoir studied at the University of St. Thomas, where he obtained a Bachelor of Science degree in chemistry in 1968. He also attended the University of Minnesota, earning a Bachelor of Science degree in accounting in 1971.

From 1971 to 1976, Levoir worked as a Certified Public Accountant for various firms and also taught accounting at the University of Minnesota. In 1974, he received a Bachelor of Arts degree in history from the university. In his late twenties, LeVoir decided to pursue an ecclesiastical career. He then entered the Saint Paul Seminary in St. Paul, Minnesota, earning a Master of Theology degree in 1981.

=== Priesthood ===
On May 30, 1981, LeVoir was ordained to the priesthood for the Archdiocese of Saint Paul and Minneapolis by Archbishop John Roach at the Cathedral of St. Paul in St. Paul.

After his 1981 ordination, LeVoir was appointed associate pastor of St. Charles Borromeo Parish in St. Anthony, Minnesota. In 1992, he became pastor of Holy Trinity Parish in South St. Paul, Minnesota. In 2000, LeVoir assumed the additional role of pastor of St. Augustine Parish in South St. Paul. He was transferred as pastor in 2004 to St. Michael Parish and St. Mary Parish, both in Stillwater, Minnesota.

=== Bishop of New Ulm ===
On July 14, 2008, Pope Benedict XVI appointed LeVoir as the fourth bishop of New Ulm. He was consecrated on September 15, 2008, by Archbishop John Nienstedt, with Bishops Frederick Campbell and Peter Christensen serving as co-consecrators.

On March 10, 2020, a $34 million settlement for 100 victims of sexual abuse victims by clergy in the diocese was approved by a bankruptcy court. During the proceedings, LeVoir apologized to the victims on behalf of the church.

=== Retirement ===
On August 6, 2020, Pope Francis accepted LeVoir's resignation as bishop of New Ulm. Bishops normally resign on their 75th birthday, but LeVoir offered his earlier due to poor health. Monsignor Douglas L. Grams was appointed as the diocesan administrator of the diocese.

== Publications ==
LeVoir co-authored the book Covenant of Love: John Paul II on Sexuality, Marriage, and Family in the Modern World and Faith for Today.

== See also ==
- Catholic Church hierarchy
- Catholic Church in the United States
- Historical list of the Catholic bishops of the United States
- List of Catholic bishops of the United States
- Lists of patriarchs, archbishops, and bishops

Catholic Church titles
Preceded by John Clayton Nienstedt	Bishop of New Ulm; 2008–2020	Succeeded by Chad Zielinski
