= Chad Zielinski =

American Roman Catholic priest and bishop

His Excellency, The Most Reverend Chad William Zielinski
- Bishop of New Ulm
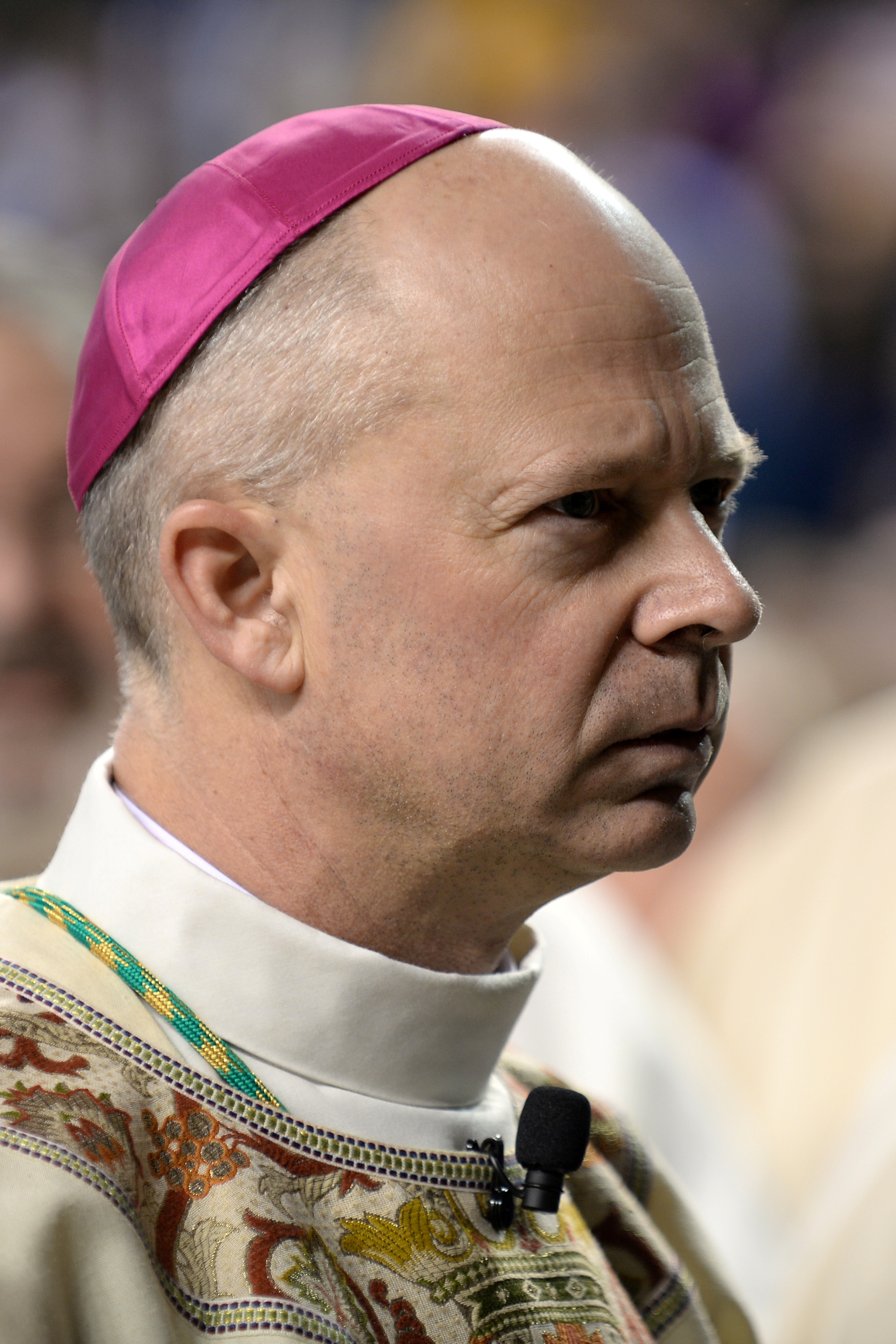
- Diocese: New Ulm
- Appointed: July 12, 2022
- Installed: September 27, 2022
- Predecessor: John M. LeVoir
- Previous post: Bishop of Fairbanks (2014–2022)

Orders
- Ordination: June 8, 1996 by Patrick R. Cooney
- Consecration: December 15, 2014 by Roger Lawrence Schwietz, Timothy Broglio, Steven J. Raica

Personal details
- Born: September 8, 1964 (age 61) Detroit, Michigan, US
- Education: Boise State University; Mount Angel Seminary; Sacred Heart Major Seminary
- Motto: He must increase

Styles of Chad William Zielinski
- Reference style: His Excellency; The Most Reverend
- Spoken style: Your Excellency
- Religious style: Bishop

Chad William Zielinski (born September 8, 1964) is an American prelate of the Roman Catholic Church who is the fifth bishop of the Diocese of New Ulm in Minnesota. He previously served as bishop of the Diocese of Fairbanks in Alaska from 2014 to 2022.

== Biography ==
=== Early life and education ===
Chad Zielinski was born on September 8, 1964, in Detroit, Michigan, the eldest of five children to Donald and Linda Zielinski. A short time later, the family moved to a farm near Alpena, Michigan. Zielinski graduated from Alpena High School in 1982. After finishing high school, Zielinski joined the United States Air Force (USAF). While stationed in Idaho, he attended Boise State University and Park University at Mountain Home AFB. It was during this period that Zielinski decided to become a priest.

After his discharge from the Air Force in 1986, Zielinski enrolled in Mount Angel Seminary in St. Benedict, Oregon, earning a bachelor's degree in philosophy in 1989. He continued his studies for the priesthood at Sacred Heart Major Seminary in Detroit, earning a Master of Divinity degree in 1996.

=== Priesthood ===
Zielinski was ordained into the priesthood for the Diocese of Gaylord on June 8, 1996, by Bishop Patrick R. Cooney at St. Mary Cathedral in Gaylord, Michigan. After his ordination, the diocese assigned Zielinski to pastoral positions in the following Michigan parishes:

- Parochial vicar at Immaculate Conception in Traverse City (1996 to 1998)
- Pastor of St. Philip Neri in Empire and St. Rita-St. Joseph in Maple City (1998 to 2000)

Zielinski was elected to the Presbyteral Council in 1999. Beginning in 2000, he also served as the pastor for administrative affairs of the diocesan Mission to Hispanics.

=== Military service ===
After the terrorist attacks of September 11, 2001, Bishop Cooney released Zielinski from the diocese to join the USAF Chaplain Corps. He served combat tours in Iraq and Afghanistan, celebrating mass with mortar fire in the background. Zielinski was stationed at Grand Forks Air Force Base in Grand Forks, North Dakota, from 2002 to 2003 and at RAF Mildenhall in Suffolk, England, from 2003 to 2005. Although he was a Catholic chaplain, he had conversations with men and women of all religions.

The USAF then assigned Zielinski to the HQ Air Force Recruiting Service at Randolph Air Force Base in Schertz, Texas, followed by a stint as cadet chaplain at the United States Air Force Academy in Colorado Springs, Colorado, from 2009 to 2012. From 2012 to 2014, Zielinski served as chaplain at Eielson Air Force Base in Fairbanks, Alaska. Zielinski was promoted to major in 2013. He was discharged from the Chaplain Corps before his installation as bishop.

=== Bishop of Fairbanks ===
Coat of arms as bishop of Fairbanks

Pope Francis named Zielinski as bishop of Fairbanks on November 8, 2014. When named to Fairbanks, he became the first active-duty chaplain in the US Armed Forces to be appointed a Catholic bishop. Zielinski was consecrated on December 15, 2014, by Archbishop Roger Schwietz. Archbishop Timothy Broglio and Bishop Steven J. Raica were the principal co-consecrators. The liturgy was held in the Carlson Center in Fairbanks.

In a diocese in which only nine of 46 parishes are accessible by road, the clergy, including Zielinski, spend a large amount of time traveling to small remote villages in rough conditions. Zielinski said:

Not every priest is called to serve in the far north, because winters are dark and cold. But the hospitality of the people is warm and gracious, and we invite priests who feel drawn to serve here to contact us. For the right servant, who will walk with the people, this frontier can be a paradise.

=== Bishop of New Ulm ===
On July 12, 2022, Francis named Zielinski the fifth bishop of New Ulm. He was installed on September 27, 2022.

== See also ==
- Catholic Church hierarchy
- Catholic Church in the United States
- Historical list of the Catholic bishops of the United States
- List of Catholic bishops of the United States
- Lists of patriarchs, archbishops, and bishops

Catholic Church titles
Preceded by John M. LeVoir	Bishop of New Ulm; 2022–present	Succeeded by Incumbent
Preceded by Donald Joseph Kettler	Bishop of Fairbanks; 2014–2022	Succeeded by Steven Maekawa
