= Archdiocese of Saint Paul and Minneapolis =

Archdiocese of the Catholic Church in Minnesota, United States

Coordinates: 44°56′45″N 93°06′28″W

Archdiocese of Saint Paul and Minneapolis Archidiœcesis Paulopolitana et Minneapolitana
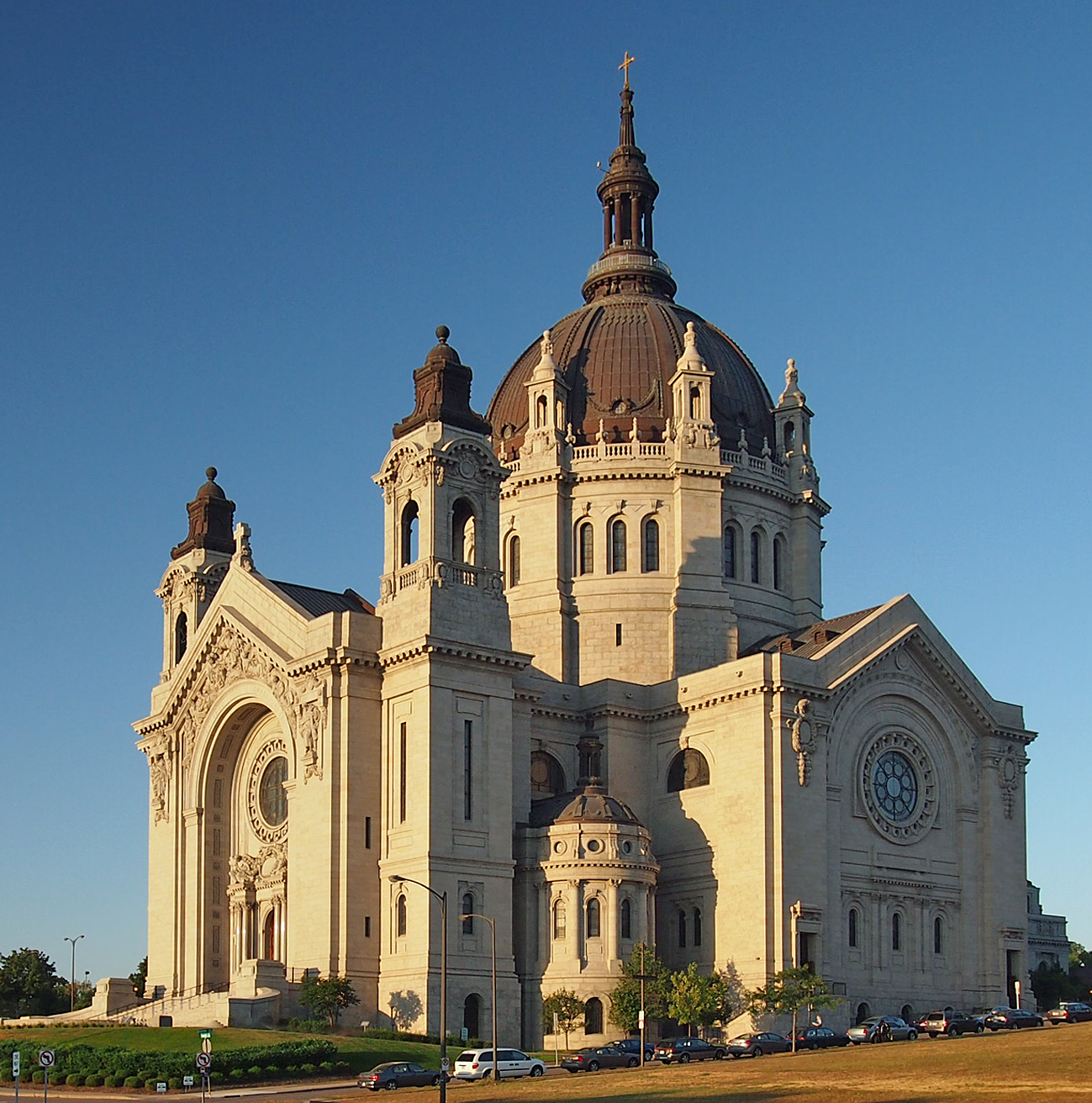
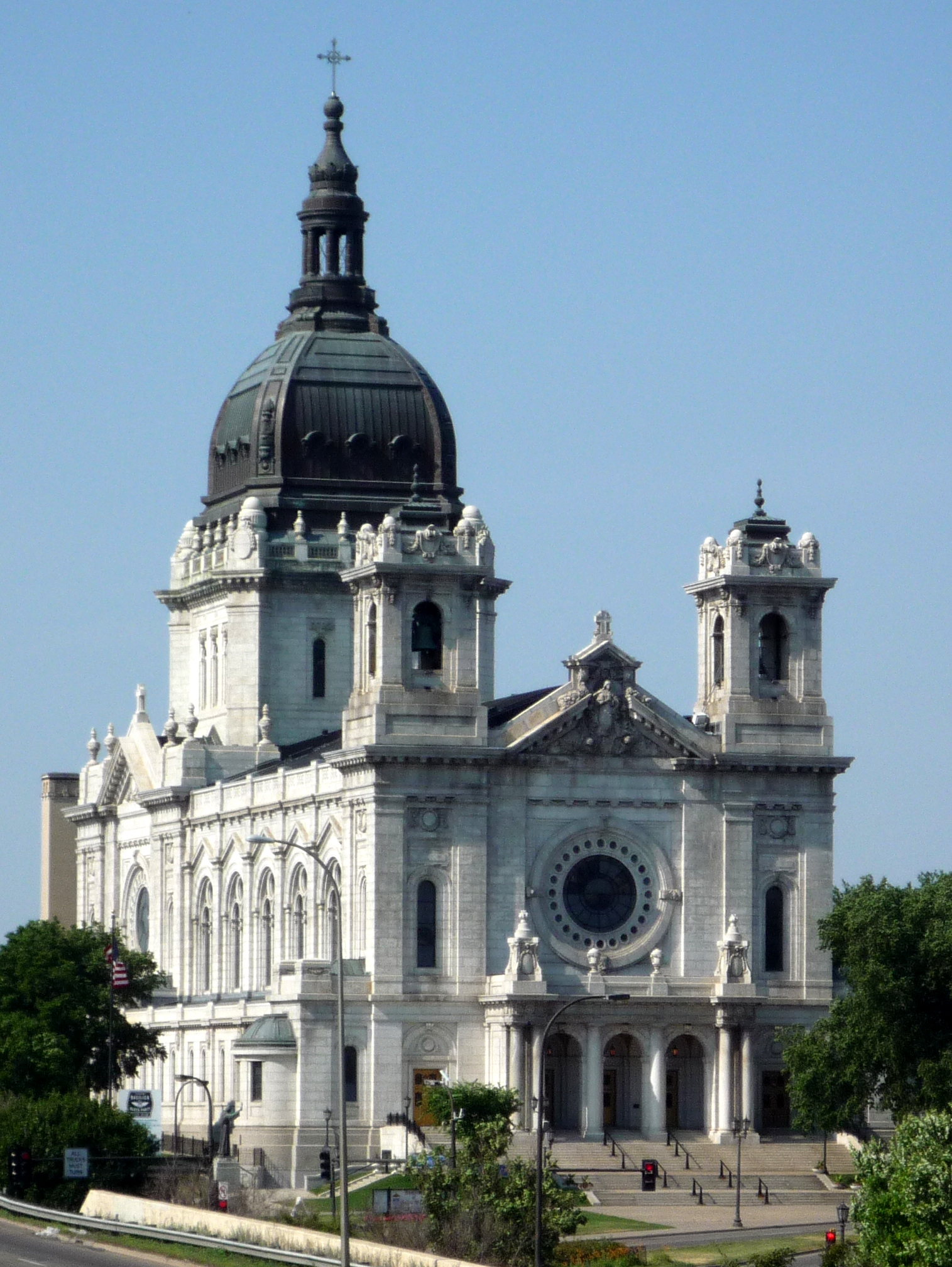
- The Cathedral of Saint Paul in Saint Paul The Co-Cathedral Basilica of Saint Mary in Minneapolis

- Coat of arms

Location
- Country: United States
- Ecclesiastical province: Saint Paul and Minneapolis

Statistics
- Area: 6,187 sq mi (16,020 km^{2})
- Population: Total; Catholics: (as of 2017); 3,337,219; 870,490 (26.1%)
- Parishes: 186

Information
- Denomination: Catholic
- Sui iuris church: Latin Church
- Rite: Roman Rite
- Established: July 19, 1850 (176 years ago)
- Cathedral: Cathedral of Saint Paul (Saint Paul)
- Co-cathedral: Basilica of Saint Mary (Minneapolis)
- Patron saint: Saint Paul (Primary); Saint John Vianney (Secondary)
- Secular priests: 340 diocesan (208 active, non-retired); 78 religious

Current leadership
- Pope: Leo XIV
- Archbishop: Bernard Hebda
- Auxiliary Bishops: Michael Izen; Kevin Kenney
- Vicar General: Michael Tix, Charles Lachowitzer
- Judicial Vicar: Michael C. Johnson
- Bishops emeritus: John Clayton Nienstedt; Lee A. Piché

Map

Website
- archspm.org

The Archdiocese of Saint Paul and Minneapolis (Latin: Archidiœcesis Paulopolitana et Minneapolitana) is a diocese of the Catholic Church in the state of Minnesota in the United States. The archbishop has both a cathedral and co-cathedral:

- The mother church is the Cathedral of Saint Paul in Saint Paul
- The co-cathedral is the Basilica of Saint Mary in Minneapolis

== History ==
=== Preceding the Diocese of Saint Paul (1698 – 1850) ===
==== French control ====
The first Catholic presence in present-day Minnesota was recorded in 1680. Louis Hennepin, a Belgian Franciscan Recollect and explorer, found a waterfall on the upper Mississippi River. Hennepin named it Chutes de Saint-Antoine (St. Anthony Falls) after his patron saint, Anthony of Padua. The French formally claimed the region in 1689, making it part of New France. In 1727, René Boucher de La Perrière, a French military officer, and Michel Guignas, a Jesuit priest, built Fort Beauharnois on the shore of Lake Pepin. They established St. Michael the Archangel, the first Catholic chapel in Minnesota. It was located the next year, where it remained occupied until the start of the French-Indian War between France and Great Britain With the end of the war in 1763, the Spanish took over the New France territories in the Great Plains and Old Northwest, including Minnesota.

==== American control ====
After the Louisiana Purchase of 1803, the United States gained control of vast areas in the continent, including present day Minnesota. Pope Leo XII in 1826 erected the Diocese of Saint Louis, centered in St. Louis, Missouri, giving it jurisdiction over Minnesota and other parts of the region. The first group of European Catholic settlers were a group of Swiss families who moved from Fort Garry in present-day Manitoba to establish the village of Saint Pierre near Fort Snelling in Minnesota.

At the Seventh Provincial Council of Baltimore in 1833, the bishops of the United States petitioned the Vatican to established a diocese in the Northwest, with St. Paul as its seat. However, the Vatican declined the request.

In 1837, the Vatican erected the Diocese of Dubuque, with jurisdiction over the new Wisconsin Territory, which included Minnesota.Bishop Mathias Loras of Dubuque in 1839 visited Fort Snelling and Saint Pierre. In 1840, Loras sent Lucien Galtier to Minnesota as a missionary. Galtier learned that a group of Catholics from the Red River Colony had settled on the east bank of the Mississippi River. He decided that it was a good location for a church as it was near a steamboat landing. Two French settlers offered a location for a church, and other settlers provided materials and labor to build a log chapel in 1841. Galtier wrote, "I had previously to this time fixed my residence at Saint Peter's and as the name of Paul is generally connected with that of Peter... I called it Saint Paul." With the gradual increase of population about the chapel, the community developed into a village known as Saint Paul's Landing. This became the city of Saint Paul.

=== Diocese of Saint Paul (1850–1888) ===
==== Joseph Crétin ====
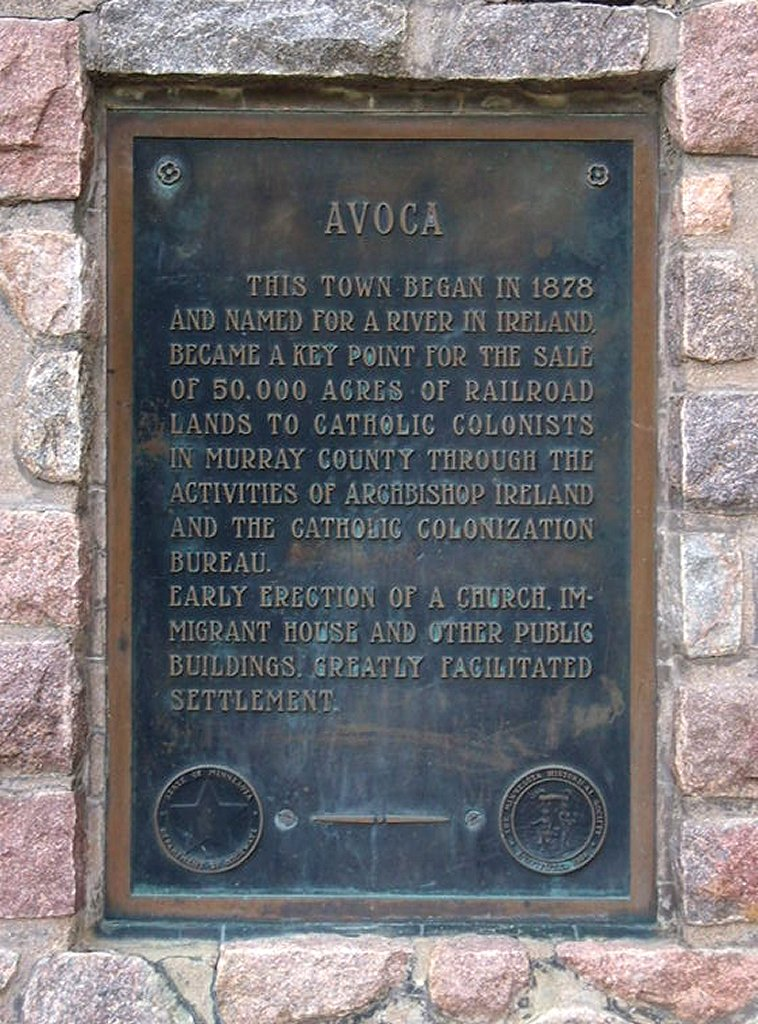
Avoca historical marker

On July 19, 1850, Pope Pius IX erected the Diocese of Saint Paul in Minnesota, taking its territory from the Diocese of Dubuque. The new diocese covered all of the new Minnesota Territory, which included Minnesota and the future states of North Dakota and South Dakota It was made part of the ecclesiastic province of St. Louis The pope named Monsignor Joseph Crétin of St. Louis as the first bishop of Saint Paul. The log chapel built by Galtier in 1841 became the first Cathedral of Saint Paul.

At the time of Crétin's consecration, the Minnesota Territory contained 3,000 Catholics, many of them French-speakers and Native American converts. However, after the federal government opened up large stretches of territory to settlement in the territory, immigration exploded. Large contingents of Irish and German Catholics arrived, locating in St. Paul and in communities on the Mississippi, St. Croix, and Minnesota Rivers. Five months after his consecration in 1850, Cretin dedicated a second cathedral, constructed of brick, in Saint Paul. However, the rapid growth of the diocese soon rendered this building obsolete.

In 1851, four members of the Sisters of St. Joseph of Carondelet arrived in St. Paul opening a girls school in the vestry of the cathedral. Crétin opened a boys school in the cathedral that same year and frequently taught lessons there.

Cretin was able to recruit some priests from France and obtain funding from the Society for the Propagation of the Faith. In 1855, four brothers from the Society of the Holy Family arrived in St. Paul from France. In 1856, Crétin laid the cornerstone for the third cathedral, made of stone, in Saint Paul. He died in 1857, missing the dedication of the cathedral in 1858.

==== Thomas Grace ====
In 1859, Thomas Grace was named bishop of St. Paul.The number of Catholics in the diocese continued to grow, with many coming from Bohemia (present-day Czech Republic) and Poland. The number of priests grew with the increase of the people, and they were so chosen as to correspond to the needs of the parishes. Hospitals were opened at Minneapolis and New Ulm, orphan asylums were erected at St. Paul and Minneapolis, and homes were established for the aged poor. In 1875, the Vatican transferred the diocese from the ecclesiastical province of St. Louis to that of Milwaukee. John Ireland was appointed coadjutor bishop to Grace, whom he succeeded in 1884.

=== Archdiocese of Saint Paul (1888–1966) ===
==== John Ireland ====
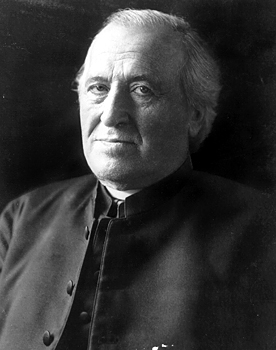
Archbishop Ireland

John Ireland was known as a strong-willed figure, known as the "consecrated blizzard of the Northwest". In 1885, Ireland established the College of Saint Thomas and Saint Paul Seminary in St. Paul and Saint Thomas Academy in Mendota Heights He constructed the Basilica of Saint Mary. Pope Leo XIII elevated the see to the rank of archdiocese on May 4, 1888, and its name was changed to reflect this. Leo XIII erected the Diocese of Winona in 1889, taking southern Minnesota from the Archdiocese of Saint Paul.

Ireland was not without controversy; in his book The Church and Modern Society (1897), he opposed the use of foreign languages in American Catholic churches and parochial schools. National (ethnic) parishes were common at the time because of the large influx of immigrants to the United States from European countries. In this, he differed from Michael Corrigan, archbishop of New York, who believed that the more quickly Catholics gave up their native languages, customs, and traditions in order to assimilate into a Protestant culture, the sooner they would forsake their religion as well. Different views on the so-called "Americanization" of the Catholic Church in the United States split the hierarchy in the 1890s. Ireland's insistence on Americanization led to Alexis Toth and his Ruthenian Catholic congregation leaving the Catholic Church to join the Russian Orthodox Church.

In 1907, Ireland laid the cornerstone for the fourth Cathedral of Saint Paul; it was dedicated in 1915. Ireland died on September 25, 1918.

==== Austin Dowling ====
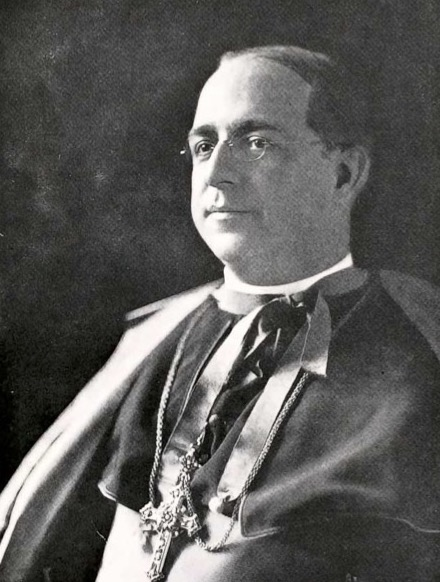
Archbishop Dowling (1919)

On January 31, 1919, Pope Benedict XV appointed Austin Dowling to succeed Ireland. In his address at his installation on March 25, 1919, Dowling described himself as "the unknown, the unexpected, [and] the undistinguished successor of the great Archbishop Ireland." Downling's legacy included establishing Nazareth Hall Preparatory Seminary in Arden Hills and the Archbishop Ireland's Education Fund. He improved Saint Paul Seminary and served on the board of Education of the National Catholic Welfare Council (NCWC)). Author Marvin O'Connell credited Dowling as "one of the leading lights" from the NCWC's inception, who headed NCWC's education department, which put him in direct contact with the Catholic Education Association. Dowling died on November 29, 1930.

==== John Gregory Murray ====
Murray was appointed by Pope Pius XI as the third archbishop of Saint Paul on October 29, 1931. In 1941, the archdiocese hosted the Ninth National Eucharistic Congress, which attracted hundreds of thousands of attendees and culminated in a Eucharistic procession that involved 80,000 people. Events for the congress were held at the Minnesota State Fairgrounds, the Saint Paul Union Depot, the Minneapolis Auditorium, the St. Paul Auditorium, the Cathedral of St. Paul and the Basilica of St. Mary elsewhere in Minnesota.

On June 16, 1956, Pope Pius XII appointed Bishop William O. Brady as coadjutor archbishop of Saint Paul due to Murray's failing health.Murray died of cancer in St. Paul on October 11, 1956, at age 79. He is interred at Resurrection Cemetery in Mendota Heights.

==== William O. Brady ====
Brady succeeded John Gregory Murray as archbishop of Saint Paul upon Murray's death on October 11, 1956. On November 18, 1957, Pope Pius XII founded the Diocese of New Ulm, taking its territory from the archdiocese. The pope named Monsignor Alphonse Schladweiler of Saint Paul as the first bishop of New Ulm. Brady died on October 1, 1961.

==== Leo Binz ====
Leo Binz was installed as the fifth archbishop of Saint Paul on April 28, 1962.

=== Archdiocese of Saint Paul and Minneapolis (1966 to present) ===
On July 11, 1966, the Holy See altered the name of the archdiocese to reflect the equal stature of the Twin Cities by naming the Basilica of Saint Mary in Minneapolis as co-cathedral of the archdiocese and adding Minneapolis to the title of the archdiocese. Subsequently, Binz became the first archbishop of Saint Paul and Minneapolis.

As seminary enrollment declined, Nazareth Hall Preparatory Seminary was closed in 1971, with Saint John Vianney College Seminary established in 1968 as a replacement for the old high school system.

As Binz's health began to decline, he requested and received a coadjutor. Pope Paul VI named the coadjutor bishop of Wichita, Leo Christopher Byrne, as coadjutor archbishop on July 31, 1967. Binz allowed Byrne to take greater control of the administration of the archdiocese, but Byrne died on October 21, 1974. Pope Paul VI accepted Binz's resignation on May 21, 1975.

==== John Roach ====
John Roach, originally a priest of the archdiocese and at the time of Binz's resignation an auxiliary bishop, was appointed archbishop to succeed Binz. On February 22, 1994, Harry Flynn was appointed by Pope John Paul II as the coadjutor archbishop of Saint Paul and Minneapolis. Roach retired on September 8, 1995.

==== Harry Flynn ====
With Roach's retirement, Flynn assumed the full archbishopric. After serving as archbishop for 12 years, Flynn requested that the pope assign him a coadjutor archbishop. On April 24, 2007, Pope Benedict XVI appointed Bishop John Nienstedt as Flynn's coadjutor.

==== John Nienstedt ====
When the pope accepted Flynn's retirement on May 2, 2008, Nienstedt succeeded him as the eighth archbishop of St. Paul and Minneapolis.

Nienstedt's tenure as archbishop was tumultuous. In October 2010, Nienstedt announced a strategic plan that called for 21 parishes to be merged into 14 neighboring parishes. These and two later mergers reduced the number of parishes in the archdiocese from 213 in October 2010 to 188 in July 2013.

In November 2012, Curtis Wehmeyer pleaded guilty to 20 sex abuse and child pornography charges. In 2013, MPR News obtained a letter revealing that archdiocesan officials, including Nienstedt and vicar general Kevin McDonough, had known of the archdiocesan decision in 2011 to cover up an allegation about sexual abuse. In 2015, Wehmeyer was laicized by the Vatican while serving a five-year prison sentence.

On June 15, 2015, Pope Francis accepted the resignations of Nienstedt and Auxiliary Bishop Lee A. Piché. The same day, Francis appointed Bernard Hebda as its apostolic administrator to serve until a new archbishop would be installed, although Hebda remained as the coadjutor archbishop of Newark.

==== Bernard Hebda ====
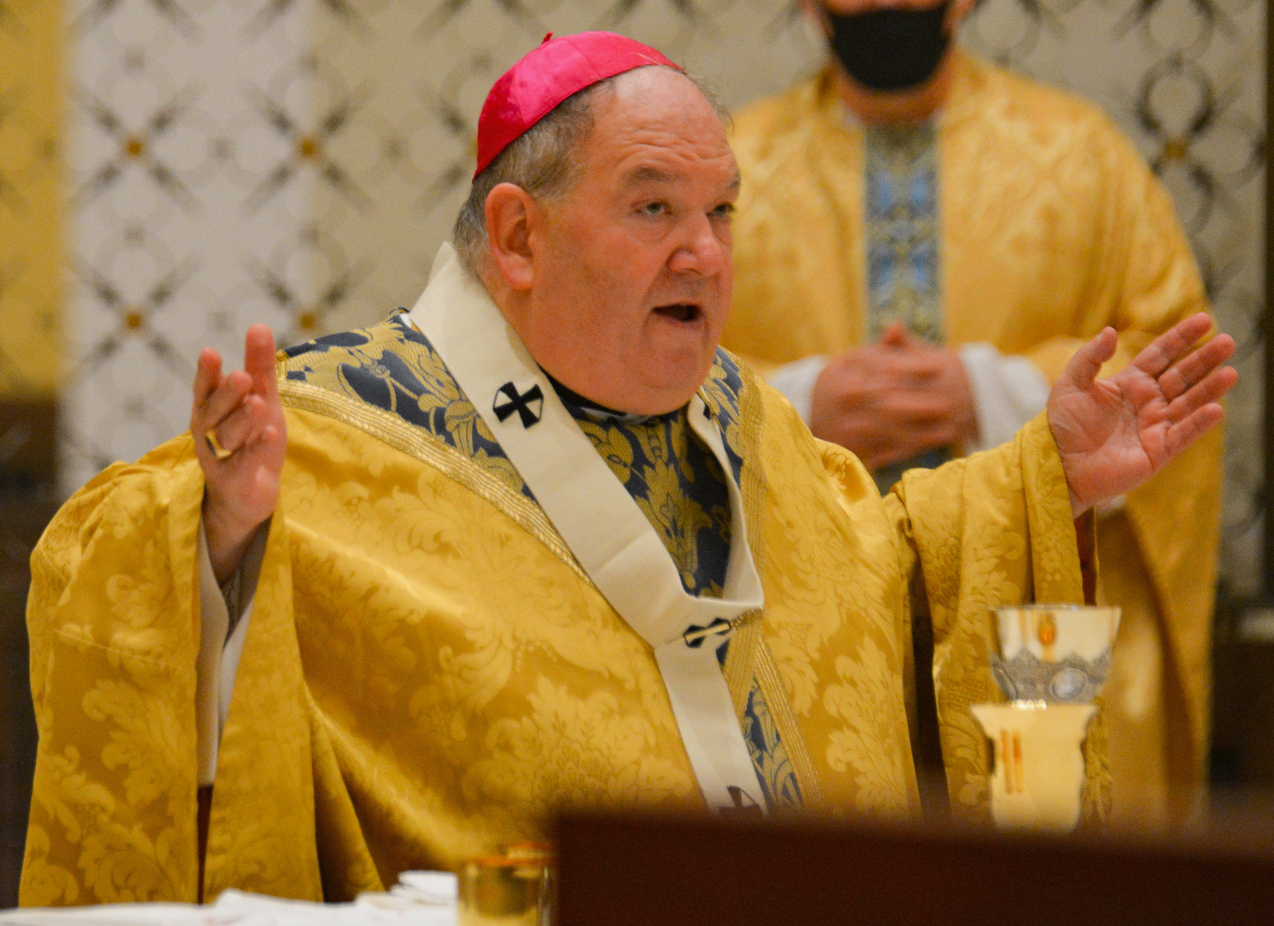
Archbishop Hebda (2021)

During Hebda's term as administrator, the archdiocese reached agreement on a civil settlement with officials of Ramsey County on procedures to prevent child sexual abuse. On March 24, 2016, Hebda was named archbishop of Saint Paul and Minneapolis. He was installed in the Cathedral of Saint Paul on May 13, 2016.

In May 2018, the archdiocese agreed to pay victims of clergy sexual abuse a $210 million in settlement, which awaited court approval. By the time the settlement was issued, 91 priests who served in the archdiocese were accused of sexually abusing 450 victims. In June 2018, the archdiocese filed for bankruptcy reorganization in order to find enough money to pay for the settlement. The settlement became the second largest in any Catholic bankruptcy case in United States history and largest overall for any archdiocese.

In June 2019, Hebda announced plans for an archdiocesan synod, the first to be held in the archdiocese in eighty years. Two years later, the synod was officially convoked. It culminated in June 2022 with an archdiocesan synodal assembly.

== Coat of arms ==
Coat of arms of Archdiocese of Saint Paul and Minneapolis
Escutcheon Barry-wavy of eight azure and argent, a sword in pale, point down, the grasp and guard shaped as a cross-patonce, between two crosses-patonce in fess gules. Symbolism The arms of the diocese features a field of waves representing Minnesota (from the Dakota mní sóta, "clear blue water"). The sword represents Paul the Apostle. Combined with the sword, the two crosses honor the Trinity. More recently, the double crosses have been taken to represent the Twin Cities of Saint Paul and Minneapolis.

== Seminaries ==
The Archdiocese of Saint Paul and Minneapolis has two seminaries,

- Saint John Vianney College Seminary – the largest college seminary in the United States
- Saint Paul Seminary

Both seminaries are located on the campus of the University of St. Thomas. From 1923 to 1971, the archdiocese operated a high school seminary, Nazareth Hall Preparatory Seminary. While the majority of archdiocesan seminarians receive their formation at Saint Paul or Saint John Vianney, some attend Immaculate Heart of Mary Seminary in Winona, Minnesota or the Pontifical North American College in Rome.

== Bishops ==
This is a list of the bishops who have served the Archdiocese of Saint Paul and Minneapolis. Forty-two priests of the diocese have become bishops.

=== Bishops of Saint Paul ===
1. Joseph Crétin (1850–1857)
2. Thomas Langdon Grace, O.P. (1859–1884)
3. John Ireland (1884–1888; coadjutor bishop 1875–1884), elevated to archbishop with elevation of diocese

=== Archbishops of Saint Paul ===
1. John Ireland (1888–1918)
2. Austin Dowling (1919–1930)
3. John Gregory Murray (1931–1956)
4. William O. Brady (1956–1961); Coadjutor Archbishop (1956)
5. Leo Binz (1961–1966); title changed with title of see

=== Archbishops of Saint Paul and Minneapolis ===
1. Leo Binz (see above 1966–1975)
  - Leo Christopher Byrne, Coadjutor Archbishop (1967–1974); died without succeeding to see
2. John Robert Roach (1975–1995)
3. Harry Joseph Flynn (1995–2008); Coadjutor Archbishop (1994–1995)
4. John Clayton Nienstedt (2008–2015); Coadjutor Archbishop (2007–2008)
5. Bernard Hebda (2016–present)

=== Current auxiliary bishops ===
- Michael Izen (2023–present)
- Kevin Kenney (2024–present)

=== Former auxiliary bishops ===
- John Jeremiah Lawler (1910–1916), appointed Bishop of Lead
- James Joseph Byrne (1947–1956), appointed Bishop of Boise and later Archbishop of Dubuque
- Leonard Philip Cowley (1957–1973)
- Gerald Francis O'Keefe (1961–1966), appointed Bishop of Davenport
- James P. Shannon (1965–1968)
- John Robert Roach (1971–1975), appointed Archbishop of Saint Paul and Minneapolis
- Raymond Alphonse Lucker (1971–1975), appointed Bishop of New Ulm
- Paul Vincent Dudley (1976–1978), appointed Bishop of Sioux Falls
- John Francis Kinney (1976–1982), appointed Bishop of Bismarck and later Bishop of Saint Cloud
- William Henry Bullock (1980–1987), appointed Bishop of Des Moines and later Bishop of Madison
- James Richard Ham, M.M. (1980–1990)
- Robert J. Carlson (1984–1994), appointed Coadjutor Bishop of Sioux Falls and later Bishop of Sioux Falls, Bishop of Saginaw, and Archbishop of St. Louis
- Joseph Charron, C.PP.S. (1990–1994), appointed Bishop of Des Moines
- Lawrence Welsh (1991–1999)
- Frederick F. Campbell (1999–2004), appointed Bishop of Columbus
- Richard Pates (2000–2008), appointed Bishop of Des Moines
- Lee A. Piché (2009–2015), resigned
- Andrew H. Cozzens (2013–2021), appointed Bishop of Crookston
- Joseph Andrew Williams (2022–2024), appointed coadjutor Bishop of Camden

=== Other diocesan priests who became bishops ===
- John Loughlin, appointed Bishop of Brooklyn in 1853
- Louis Joseph Mary Theodore de Goesbriand, appointed Bishop of Burlington in 1853
- James McGolrick, appointed Bishop of Duluth in 1889
- Patrick Delany, appointed Coadjutor Archbishop of Hobart, Australia in 1893
- Thomas O'Gorman, appointed Bishop of Sioux Falls in 1896
- James Trobec, appointed Bishop of Saint Cloud in 1897
- Alexander Christie, appointed Bishop of Vancouver Island in 1898
- James John Keane, appointed Bishop of Cheyenne in 1902
- John Stariha, appointed Bishop of Lead in 1902
- Joseph Francis Busch, appointed Bishop of Lead in 1910
- Timothy J. Corbett, appointed Bishop of Crookston in 1910
- Patrick Richard Heffron, appointed Bishop of Winona in 1910
- James Albert Duffy, appointed Bishop of Kearney in 1913
- Thomas Anthony Welch, appointed Bishop of Duluth in 1925
- James Louis Connolly, appointed Coadjutor Bishop of Fall River in 1945
- Francis Joseph Schenk, appointed Bishop of Crookston in 1945
- Alphonse James Schladweiler, appointed Bishop of New Ulm in 1957
- Nicolas Eugene Walsh, appointed Bishop of Yakima in 1974
- Peter Forsyth Christensen, appointed Bishop of Superior in 2007
- John Marvin LeVoir, appointed Bishop of New Ulm in 2008
- Paul David Sirba, appointed Bishop of Duluth in 2009
- Donald Edward DeGrood, appointed Bishop of Sioux Falls in 2019

== Education ==
The Catholic Schools of the Archdiocese of Saint and Minneapolis, as of 2026, had 78 elementary schools and 16 high schools, with a total student enrollment of approximately 31,000.

=== Archdiocesan high schools ===
- Academy of Holy Angels – Richfield
- Benilde-St. Margaret's – St. Louis Park
- Bethlehem Academy – Faribault
- Chesterton Academy – Hopkins
- Cretin-Derham Hall – St. Paul
- Cristo Rey Jesuit High School – Minneapolis
- DeLaSalle High School – Minneapolis
- Hill-Murray School – Maplewood
- Holy Family Catholic High School – Victoria
- Holy Spirit Academy – Monticello
- Providence Academy – Plymouth
- Saint Agnes School – St. Paul
- Saint Thomas Academy – Mendota Heights
- Totino-Grace High School – Fridley
- Unity Catholic High School – Burnsville
- Visitation School – Mendota Heights

== Ecclesiastical Province of Saint Paul and Minneapolis ==
Diocesan map of the province of Saint Paul and Minneapolis Archdiocese of Saint Paul and Minneapolis Diocese of Saint Cloud Diocese of Winona–Rochester Diocese of New Ulm Diocese of Duluth Diocese of Crookston Diocese of Fargo Diocese of Bismarck Diocese of Rapid City Diocese of Sioux Falls

=== Minnesota ===
- Archdiocese of Saint Paul and Minneapolis (Metropolitan See)
- Diocese of Crookston
- Diocese of Duluth
- Diocese of New Ulm
- Diocese of Saint Cloud
- Diocese of Winona–Rochester

=== North Dakota ===
- Diocese of Bismarck
- Diocese of Fargo

=== South Dakota ===
- Diocese of Rapid City
- Diocese of Sioux Falls

== Notable parishes ==
- Cathedral of Saint Paul – Saint Paul, mother church of the archdiocese
- Basilica of Saint Mary – Minneapolis, first basilica in the United States
- Our Lady of Lourdes Catholic Church – Minneapolis, oldest church building in continuous use in Minneapolis
- Our Lady of Guadalupe - Saint Paul, first and only diocesan shrine, established in 2019
- Church of Saint Peter – Mendota, first Catholic parish in Minnesota
