= Cathedral of Saint Mary (St. Cloud, Minnesota) =

Cathedral of St. Mary
- St. Mary's Cathedral
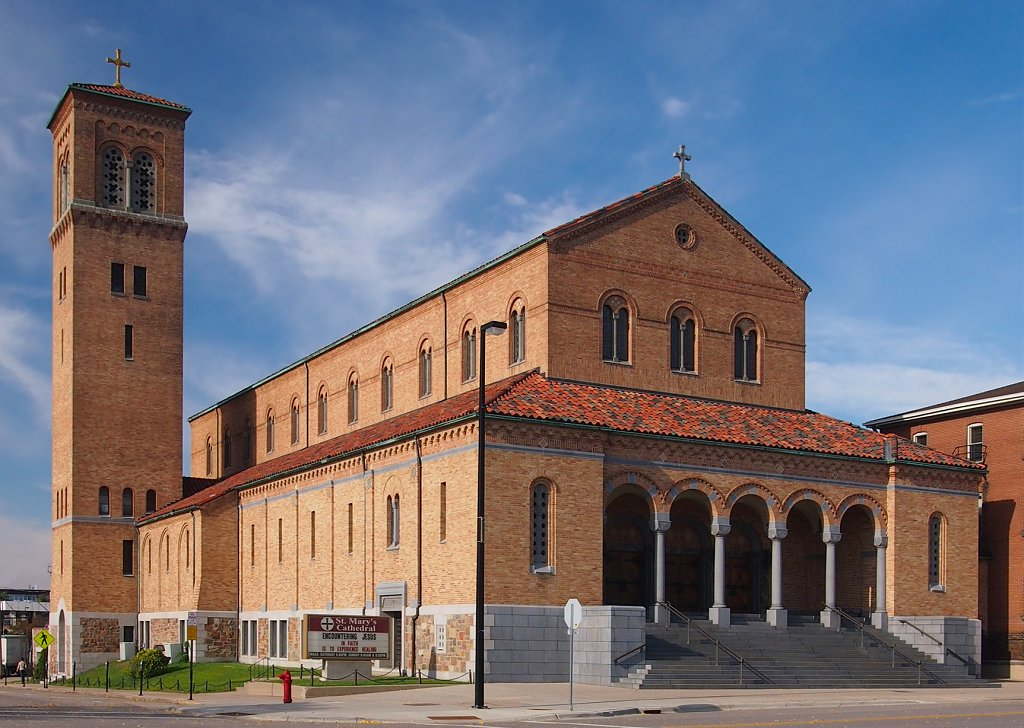
- The Cathedral of St. Mary from the east

- Location within Minnesota Cathedral of St. Mary (the United States)
- 45°33′32″N 94°09′41″W
- Location: 25 8th Ave. S St. Cloud, Minnesota
- Country: United States
- Denomination: Catholic Church
- Website: www.stmarystcloud.org

History
- Founded: 1855
- Dedication: Blessed Virgin Mary
- Dedicated: 1931
- Consecrated: 1982

Architecture
- Architect: Nairne W. Fisher
- Architectural type: Italianate
- Style: Italianate
- Groundbreaking: 1922
- Completed: 1931

Specifications
- Height: 75 feet (23 m)
- Materials: Brick

Administration
- Diocese: Saint Cloud

Clergy
- Bishop: Most Rev. Patrick Neary
- Rector: Rev. Scott Pogatchnik
- Vicar: Rev. Doug Liebsch
- Pastor: Rev. Scott Pogatchnik

The Cathedral of St. Mary, in St. Cloud, Minnesota, United States, is the cathedral and parish church in the Catholic Diocese of St. Cloud. The St. Cloud Diocese serves Central Minnesota and a Catholic population of about 150,000.

== History ==
=== Saint Mary's Church ===
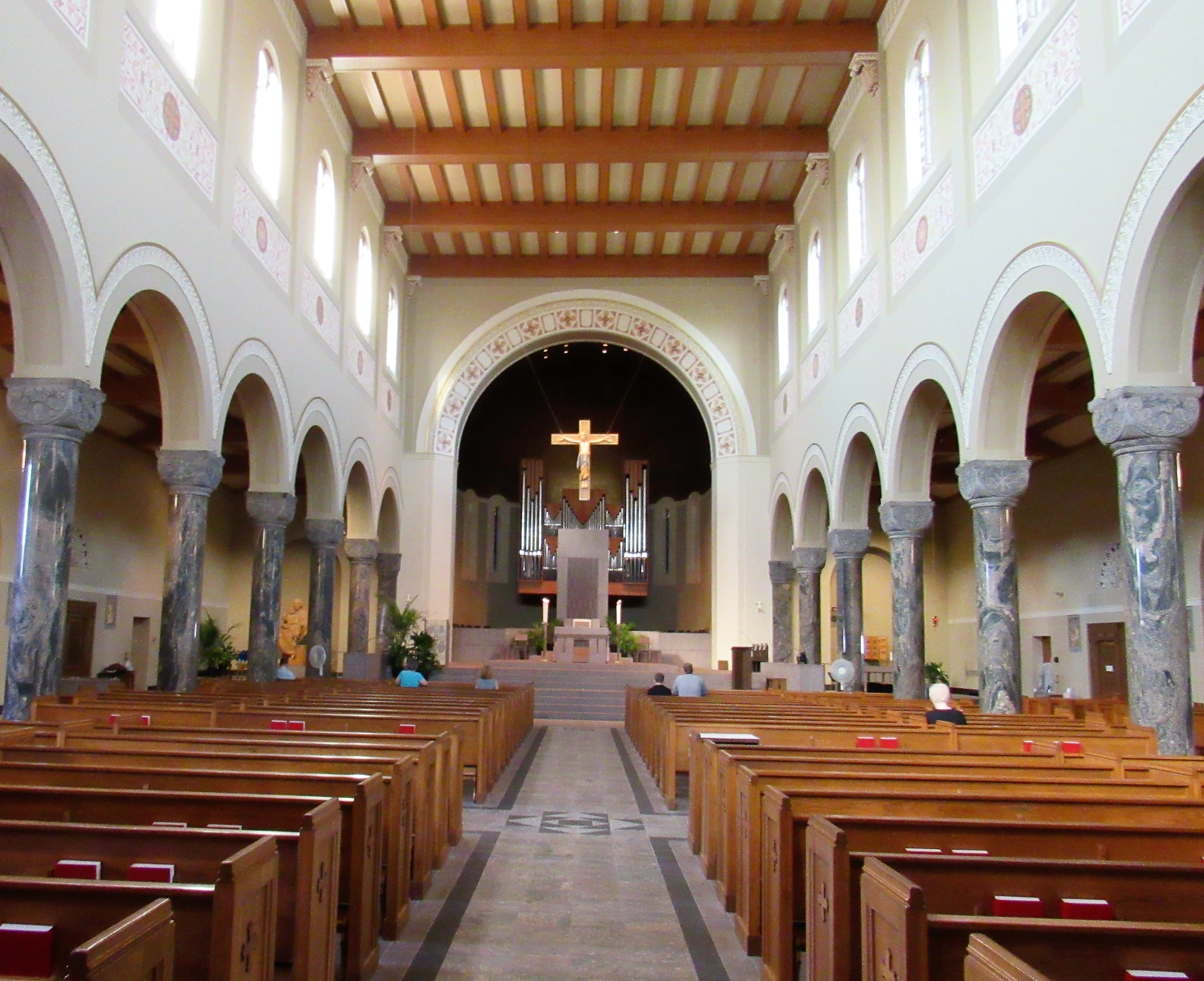
Cathedral interior

Saint Mary's Parish was founded in 1855 by the Reverend Francis Xavier Pierz. He celebrated the first Mass in the parish on May 21 in the home of John and Catherina Schwarz. Property was bought for $500 and plans were made for a wood-frame church and a school. In 1856 a Benedictine monk from Saint John's Abbey in Collegeville, Minnesota, became the parish's first pastor, and a combination church and school building was built on Eighth Avenue, across the street from the current parish offices. Benedictine nuns from Pennsylvania arrived in 1857 to start the parish school. It was the first school in Stearns County. They lived in a parishioner's attic until John Tenvoorde rented his "entertainment center" for use as a convent. Six years later they moved to Saint Benedict's Monastery in Saint Joseph, Minnesota. After two years they returned to St. Mary's and continued to teach at the school.

A more permanent and larger Gothic-style church was built for the parish in 1864 at Saint Germain Street and Ninth Avenue. A large rectory and a new school building were built in 1896. A four-story parish center, called Saint Mary's Institute, was built in 1916. The building featured a bowling alley and swimming pool. It was on Eighth Avenue across the street from the church.

The Gothic-style church burned to the ground in 1920 and construction of the present church building started in 1922. When the basement was completed, Mass was held there until construction on the upper church ended in 1931. The church was designed after the sixth-century Basilica of Sant'Apollinare in Classe in Ravenna, Italy. The parish's pastor, Luke Fink, OSB, attended a Eucharistic Congress in Italy and was inspired by the architecture there. He relayed his plans to a local architect, Nairne W. Fisher, who designed the upper building.

=== Cathedral ===
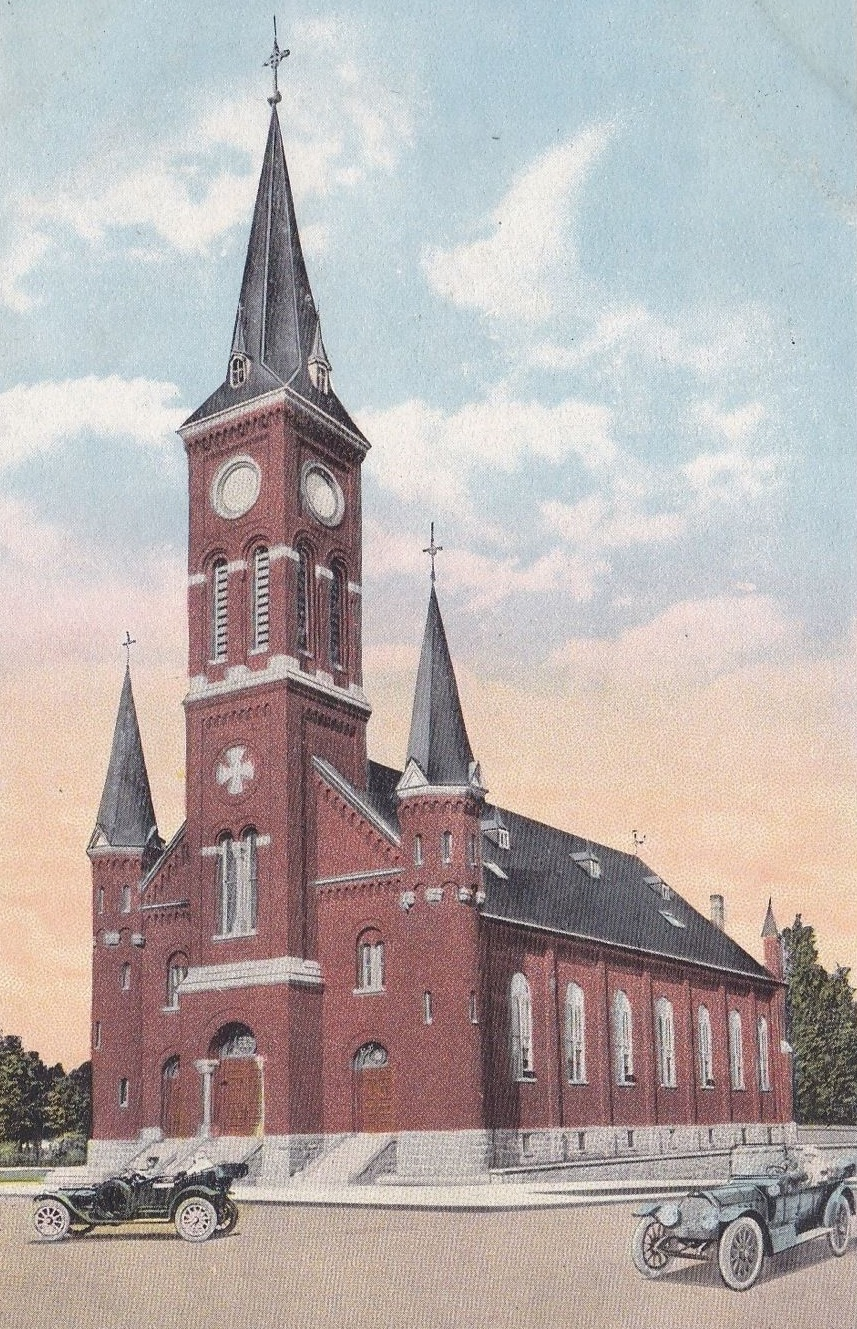
Holy Angels Cathedral

Holy Angels Cathedral in St. Cloud was severely damaged in a fire in 1933. It was rebuilt without its tall spire, which led Bishop Joseph Francis Busch to desire St. Mary's as his cathedral. The Holy Angels Cathedral still stands today, and was renovated and turned into Holy Angels Performing Arts Center for Cathedral High School. In 1937 Pope Pius XI named St. Mary's the cathedral of the St. Cloud Diocese. At that time the Benedictine monks left St. Mary's for St. Augustine parish on the east side of St. Cloud and were replaced by diocesan clergy.

The rectory had fallen into disrepair and was torn down in 1947. The priests moved into the convent and the sisters moved to the top floor of Saint Mary's Institute. Saint Gertrude's School, which educated the mentally disabled, occupied the first floor of the Institute for a time. That building was sold and torn down in 1971.

The cathedral was extensively renovated beginning in 1980 under the direction of Frank Kacmarcik. The pipe organ was installed in the apse and dedicated in 1984. The Mother of Perpetual Help Shrine in the lower church was destroyed in a fire that extensively damaged the lower church and did smoke damage to the upper church. The lower church was renovated to create a chapel for Mass during the week, as well as a Eucharistic chapel and a gathering space. Five terra cotta disks that portrayed the crux gammata or swastika, an ancient stylized cross. The symbols were portrayed in a rough-hewn wooden texture, with olive branch leaves and fruit in the background. They were removed from the exterior of the cathedral in 2006. Because of its association with the Nazi Party in Germany, the parish determined the crux gammata could never recover its association with the Cross of Christ. They were replaced by five new limestone disks depicting the Luminous Mysteries composed by Pope John Paul II. In 2013 the cathedral got a new floor, interior paint, and refurbished pews and kneelers.

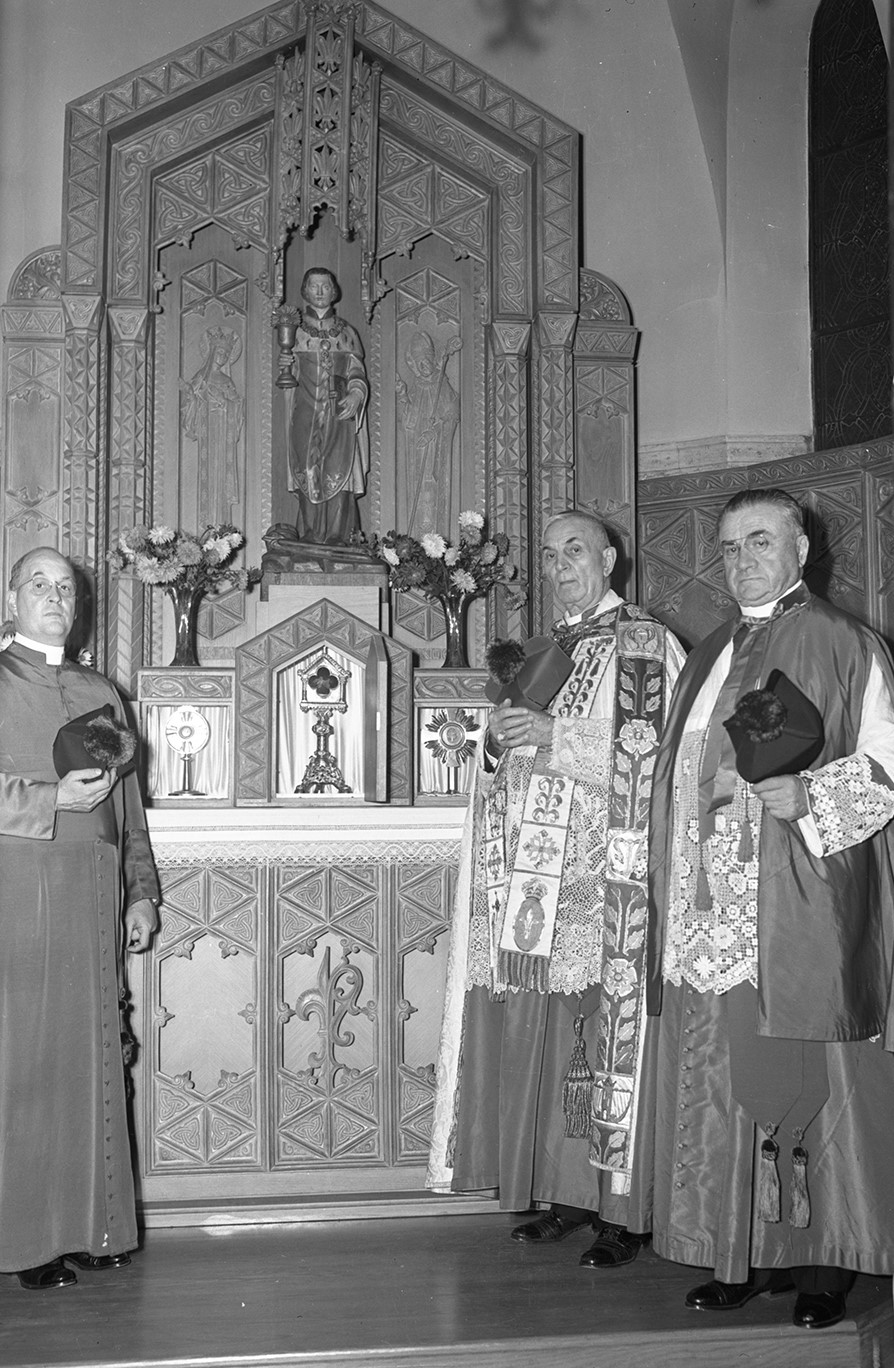
Msgr. Edward Mahowald, Bishop Joseph F. Busch, and Msgr. Camile Thiebaut stand before the shrine to St. Cloud at its dedication, September 13, 1942.

== Shrine of Saint Cloud ==
Within St. Mary's is a shrine to Saint Cloud with several relics: a piece of St. Cloud's clothing, a bone fragment from Saint Cloud himself, and fragments from five other saints. The statue of St. Cloud in the shrine is a replica of a 17th-century statue, the oldest known statue of St. Cloud. The hand holding the chalice and the chalice itself are older, being from the original 8th-century statue. The statue was given to Bishop Joseph Busch in 1922 when he participated in the 14th centenary celebration of the birth of St. Cloud in the commune of Saint-Cloud, France. Two wood reliefs flank the statue. The one on the left is of St. Clothilde, St. Cloud's grandmother. The one on the right is of St. Remigius, Bishop of Rheims, whom St. Cloud lived with in his youth. The shrine and reliefs were designed by Frank W. Jackson, an architect based in St. Cloud.

== See also ==
- List of Catholic cathedrals in the United States
- List of cathedrals in the United States
