= Log pri Polhovem Gradcu =

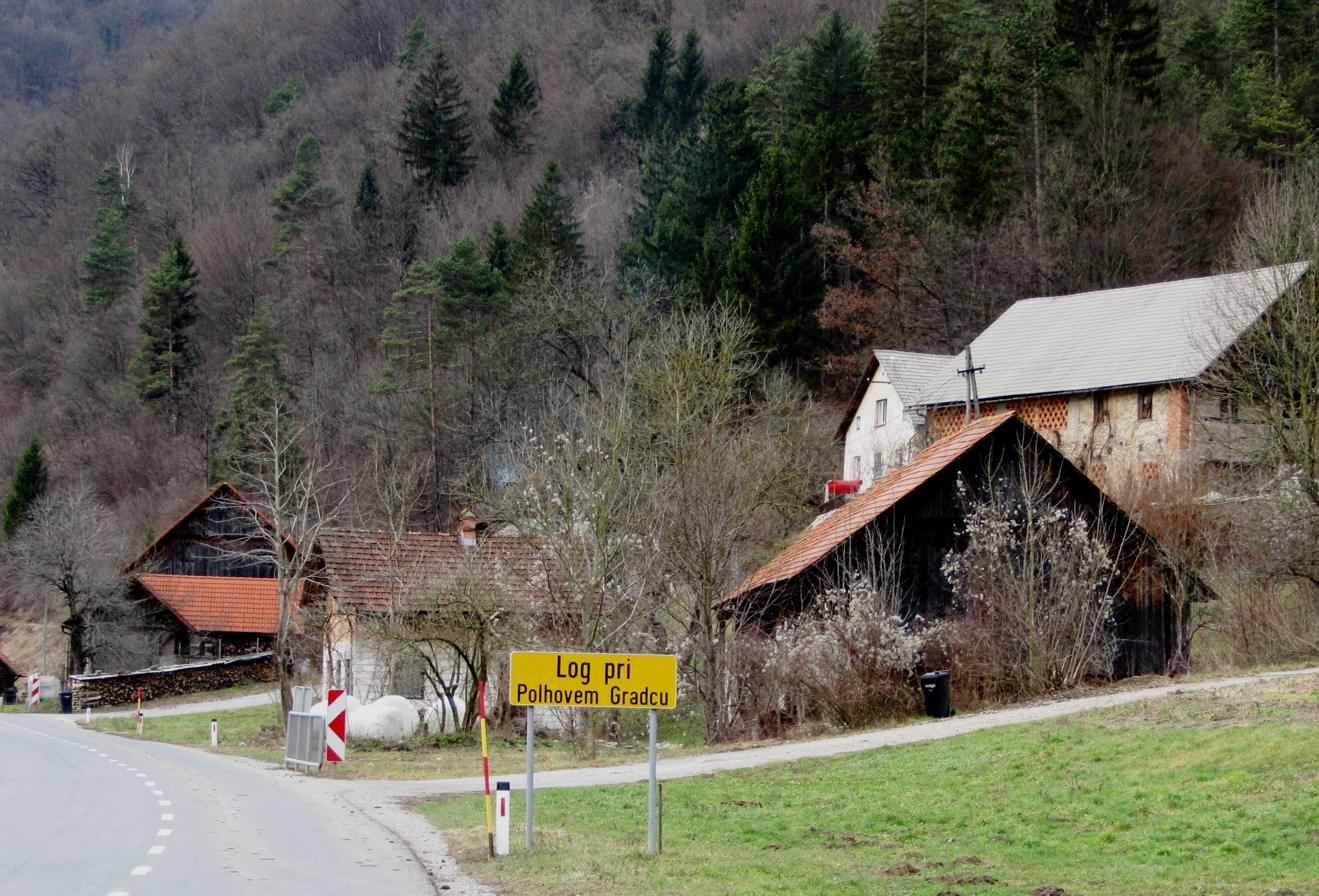

- Location in Slovenia
- Coordinates: 46°4′23.44″N 14°21′43.7″E
- Country: Slovenia
- Traditional region: Upper Carniola
- Statistical region: Central Slovenia
- Municipality: Dobrova–Polhov Gradec

Area
  - Total: 0.71 km^{2} (0.27 sq mi)
- Elevation: 333.8 m (1,095 ft)

Population (2020)
  - Total: 38

Log pri Polhovem Gradcu (pronounced [ˈloːk pɾi ˈpou̯ːxoʋɛm ˈɡɾaːtsu]) is a small dispersed settlement east of Polhov Gradec in the Municipality of Dobrova–Polhov Gradec in the Upper Carniola region of Slovenia.

== Name ==
The name of the settlement was changed from Log to Log pri Polhovem Gradcu in 1953. The name Log pri Polhovem Gradcu literally means 'meadow near Polhov Gradec'. The name Log is shared with many other settlements in Slovenia and is derived from the Slovene word log 'a partially forested (marshy) meadow near water' or 'woods near a settlement'. In the past it was known as Losi in German.

== Notable people ==
Notable people that were born or lived in Log pri Polhovem Gradcu include:

- James Trobec (1838–1921), bishop of Saint Cloud, Minnesota
