= Rupert Seidenbusch =

German prelate

The Right Reverend Rupert Seidenbusch OSB
- Vicar Apostolic of Northern Minnesota
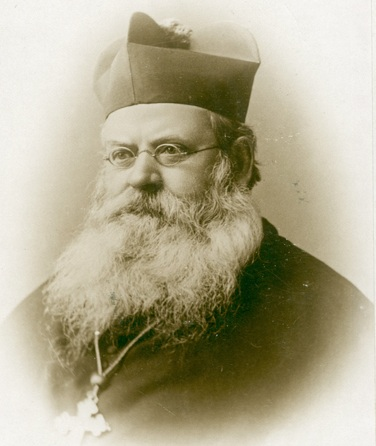
- Church: Catholic Church
- See: Northern Minnesota
- Appointed: February 12, 1875
- Retired: November 15, 1888
- Predecessor: Office established
- Successor: Otto Zardetti (as Bishop of Saint Cloud)

Orders
- Ordination: June 22, 1853 by Michael O'Connor
- Consecration: May 30, 1875 by Michael Heiss

Personal details
- Born: October 13, 1830; Munich, Germany
- Died: June 3, 1895 (aged 64); Richmond, Virginia, U.S.

Rupert Seidenbusch OSB (October 13, 1830 – June 3, 1895) was a German prelate of the Catholic Church. A Benedictine monk, he served as the first abbot of Saint John's Abbey (1866-1875) and the first Vicar Apostolic of Northern Minnesota (1875-1888).

== Biography ==
=== Early life and ministry ===
Seidenbusch was born on October 13, 1830, in Munich and received his early education there before entering the diocesan seminary in Freising, where he pursued classical and philosophical studies. Volunteering for missionary work in the United States, he traveled with fellow Bavarian Francis Xavier Krautbauer and arrived in October 1850. He then entered the Benedictine community at Saint Vincent Abbey in Latrobe, Pennsylvania, making his solemn vows on January 6, 1852. He was director of Saint Vincent College during the 1852-53 school year while still a theological student.

Seidenbusch was ordained a priest on June 22, 1853, by Bishop Michael O'Connor. He worked on missions around Westmoreland County until 1855, when he was appointed pastor at St. Marys in Elk County. In 1857 he was transferred to St. Mary's Abbey Church in Newark, New Jersey, which served local German Catholics and where Seidenbusch oversaw the completion of the church. Returning to Pennsylvania, he was elected prior of Saint Vincent Abbey in 1862.

=== Abbot ===
On December 12, 1866, Seidenbusch was elected the first abbot of the Abbey of St. Louis on the Lake (later known as Saint John's Abbey) in Collegeville, Minnesota. The abbey had been established as a priory by his fellow monks from Saint Vincent Abbey in Pennsylvania at the behest of Bishop Joseph Crétin to minister to the German immigrants in central Minnesota. His election was confirmed by Pope Pius IX on March 15, 1867, and he was formally inducted into office on the following May 30 by Bishop George Aloysius Carrell.

During his nine years at the abbey, Seidenbusch oversaw the construction of a chapel, saw and flour mills, barns for livestock, and a woodworking shop. He also traveled to Europe to solicit funds and recruit vocations. As abbot, he was the ex officio president of Saint John's College, which was authorized to grant degrees by the Minnesota Legislature in 1869. The college went from 28 students at the beginning of his tenure to 150 by his departure.

=== Bishop ===
Seidenbusch was appointed the first Vicar Apostolic of Northern Minnesota (later the Diocese of Saint Cloud) by Pope Pius IX on February 12, 1875. He was also given the titular see of Alia and resigned as abbot on May 4. He received his episcopal consecration on May 30 from Bishop Michael Heiss, with Bishops Joseph Dwenger and Louis Mary Fink serving as co-consecrators.

After his consecration, Seidenbusch traveled across the vicariate by buggy, wagon, and rail and continued to solicit donations from Europe. He used Saint Mary's Church as his temporary cathedral, where he administered confirmation for the first time in June 1875. He performed his first priestly ordinations at Saint John's College the following August. In 1879 part of the vicariate was divided into the Vicariate Apostolic of Dakota (later the Diocese of Sioux Falls). He oversaw the completion of Holy Angels Cathedral in 1884, and attended the third Plenary Council of Baltimore that same year.

Due to ill health, Seidenbusch submitted his resignation on October 19, 1888, and it was accepted by Pope Leo XIII on November 15. By the end of his tenure, the vicariate had a Catholic population of more than 45,000 people, as well as 70 priests, 90 churches, 50 chapels, and 14 convents.

He died at the Benedictine priory in Richmond, Virginia, on June 3, 1895, at age 64. He was buried in the cemetery of Saint John's Abbey in Collegeville.
