= James Ham =

James Ham may refer to:

- James Milton Ham (1920–1997), Canadian engineer and university administrator
- James Richard Ham (1921–2002), Roman Catholic bishop
