= John Francis Kinney =

American Roman Catholic prelate (1937–2019)

His Excellency, The Most Reverend John Francis Kinney
- Bishop of Saint Cloud; Titular Bishop of Caprulae
- See: Diocese of Saint Cloud
- Appointed: May 9, 1995
- Installed: July 6, 1995
- Term ended: September 20, 2013
- Predecessor: Jerome Hanus
- Successor: Donald Joseph Kettler
- Previous posts: Auxiliary Bishop of Saint Paul and Minneapolis; 1976 to 1982; Bishop of Bismarck; 1982 to 1995

Orders
- Ordination: February 2, 1963 by Leo Binz
- Consecration: January 25, 1977 by John Robert Roach, Leo Binz, and James Richard Ham

Personal details
- Born: June 11, 1937 Oelwein, Iowa, US
- Died: September 27, 2019 (aged 82) Saint Cloud, Minnesota, US
- Education: Pontifical Lateran University
- Motto: Caritas Christi urget nos (The love of Christ compels us)
- Coat of arms

Styles of John Francis Kinney
- Reference style: His Excellency; The Most Reverend
- Spoken style: Your Excellency
- Religious style: Bishop

John Francis Kinney (June 11, 1937 – September 27, 2019) was an American prelate of the Roman Catholic Church. He served as the ninth bishop of the Diocese of St. Cloud in Minnesota from 1995 to 2013.

Kinney previously served as the fifth bishop of the Diocese of Bismarck in North Dakota from 1982 to 1995 and as an auxiliary bishop of the Archdiocese of Saint Paul and Minneapolis in Minnesota from 1976 to 1982.

== Biography ==
=== Early life ===
John Kinney was born on June 11, 1937, in Oelwein, Iowa, to John and Marie (née McCarty) Kinney. He received his primary education at St. Thomas Elementary School in Winona, Minnesota, and Annunciation elementary school in Minneapolis. Kinney attended DeLaSalle High School in Minneapolis before entering Nazareth Hall Seminary in St. Paul. Kinney graduated from St. Paul Seminary in St. Paul in 1963.

=== Priesthood ===
Kinney was ordained to the priesthood by Archbishop Leo Binz on February 2, 1963, in the Cathedral of Saint Paul in St. Paul. After his ordination, the archdiocese assigned Kinney as assistant pastor of St. Thomas Parish in Minneapolis. He was named vice-chancellor of the archdiocese in 1966. From 1968 to 1971, Kinney completed his graduate studies at the Pontifical Lateran University in Rome, obtaining a doctorate in canon law.

After returning to Minnesota, he resumed his post as vice-chancellor, rising to become full chancellor in 1973. He also served as pastor of St. Leonard of Port Maurice Parish in Minneapolis

=== Auxiliary Bishop of St. Paul-Minneapolis ===
On November 9, 1976, Kinney was appointed as an auxiliary bishop of Saint Paul and Minneapolis and titular bishop of Caprulae by Pope Paul VI. He received his episcopal consecration on January 25, 1977, from Archbishop John Roach, with Archbishop Binz and Bishop James Richard Ham serving as co-consecrators, in the Basilica of Saint Mary in Minneapolis, Minnesota. Kinney served as archdiocesan vicar for parishes from 1979 to 1982.

=== Bishop of Bismarck ===
Kinney was named by Pope John Paul II as the fifth bishop of Bismarck on June 28, 1982, and was installed on August 23, 1982. He served on the board of Catholic Relief Services from 1993 to 1998. At the US Conference of Catholic Bishops (UCCB) in 1993, Kinney headed a new committee on sexual abuse allegations that was named "Uncomfortable Listening". He made these remarks:

I want to make sure that all of us bishops understand the depth and seriousness, the pain and the agony of this problem, and why it strikes at the very heart of the church's trust level and credibility.

=== Bishop of St. Cloud ===
John Paul II appointed Kinney as the ninth bishop of St. Cloud on May 9, 1995, being installed on July 6, 1995. Within the USCCB, Kinney sat on the Committee for Priestly Life and Ministry, Committee on Migration, and the USCCB's Administrative Committee. He chaired the Ad Hoc Committee on Bishops' Life and Ministry, Ad Hoc Committee on Sexual Abuse, and Committee on Permanent Diaconate.

=== Retirement and legacy ===
On September 20, 2013, Pope Francis accepted Kinney's resignation as bishop of St. Cloud. Bishop Donald Joseph Kettler of Fairbanks was appointed his successor on the same day. Kinney died on September 27, 2019, in St. Cloud, aged 82.

== See also ==
- Catholic Church hierarchy
- Catholic Church in the United States
- Historical list of the Catholic bishops of the United States
- List of Catholic bishops of the United States
- Lists of patriarchs, archbishops, and bishops

== Episcopal succession ==
Catholic Church titles
Preceded by Jerome George Hanus, OSB	Bishop of St. Cloud; 1995–2013	Succeeded by Donald Joseph Kettler
Preceded by Hilary Baumann Hacker	Bishop of Bismarck; 1982–1995	Succeeded by Paul Albert Zipfel
Preceded by -	Auxiliary Bishop of Saint Paul and Minneapolis; 1977–1982	Succeeded by -
