= Peter William Bartholome =

American prelate

His Excellency, The Most Reverend Peter William Bartholome
- Bishop of Saint Cloud; Titular Bishop of Tanaramusa
- Church: Roman Catholic Church
- See: Diocese of Saint Cloud
- Other post: Titular Bishop of Tanaramusa

Orders
- Ordination: June 17, 1917 by Patrick Heffron
- Consecration: March 3, 1942 by Amleto Cicognani

Personal details
- Born: April 2, 1893 Bellechester, Minnesota, US
- Died: June 17, 1982 (aged 89)
- Education: Campion College; St. Paul Seminary; Apollinare University

Peter William Bartholome (April 2, 1893 – June 17, 1982) was an American prelate of the Roman Catholic Church. He served as bishop of the Diocese of Saint Cloud in Minnesota from 1953 to 1968.

== Biography ==
=== Early life ===
Peter Bartholome was born in Bellechester, Minnesota, the youngest son of Nicholas and Catherine (née Jacobs) Bartholome, who were Luxembourgian immigrants. His mother, who died at age 103, was the first woman named Catholic Mother of the Year by the National Catholic Conference on Family Life in 1942 and received the Pro Ecclesia et Pontifice medal in 1952.

Bartholome received his early education at St. Mary's Grade School in Bellechester (1898-1905) before attending public school in Goodhue, Minnesota, from 1906 to 1908. He studied at Campion College in Prairie du Chien, Wisconsin, where he earned a Bachelor of Arts degree in 1914. Bartholome then returned to Minnesota and continued his studies at St. Paul Seminary in St. Paul.

=== Priesthood ===
Bartholome was ordained to the priesthood by Bishop Patrick Heffron on June 17, 1917. His first assignment was as a curate at St. John the Evangelist Parish in Rochester, Minnesota, where he remained for two years. In 1919, he was appointed to the faculty of St. Mary's College in Winona, Minnesota, where he taught Latin, Greek, and philosophy. From 1928 to 1930, Bartholome studied canon law at the Apollinare University in Rome.

Returning to Minnesota, Bartholome served as chaplain at the motherhouse of the Sisters of Saint Francis in Rochester for three years. He was pastor of St. John the Baptist Parish in Caledonia, Minnesota, from 1933 to 1936. He was then named diocesan director of the Society for the Propagation of the Faith and of the Confraternity of Christian Doctrine. In 1939, Bartholome returned to St. John the Evangelist Parish in Rochester, serving as its pastor until 1942.

=== Coadjutor Bishop and Bishop of Saint Cloud ===
On December 6, 1941, Bartholome was appointed coadjutor bishop of Saint Cloud and titular bishop of Lete by Pope Pius XII. He received his episcopal consecration on March 3, 1942, from Archbishop Amleto Cicognani, with Bishops Joseph Busch and John Peschges serving as co-consecrators, at St. Mary's Hospital Chapel in Rochester. Upon the death of Bishop Joseph Busch, Bartholome automatically succeeded him to become the fifth Bishop of Saint Cloud on May 31, 1953. He was named an assistant at the pontifical throne in 1954.

Born and raised in a rural area, and spending his entire ministry there as well, Bartholome once said that "the dignity, independence, and freedom of men can reach its fullest stature on the farm, not in the industrial world." Between 1962 and 1965, he attended the Second Vatican Council. He also served as episcopal moderator of the Family Life Bureau and of the National Catholic Conference on Family Life.

=== Retirement and legacy ===
Bartholome's resignation as bishop of the Diocese of Saint Cloud was accepted by Pope Paul VI on January 31, 1968. He was appointed Titular Bishop of Tanaramusa on the same date; he later resigned on January 13, 1971.

Peter Bartholome died on June 17, 1982, at age 89.

== Episcopal succession ==
Catholic Church titles
Preceded by Joseph Francis Busch	Bishop of St. Cloud; 1953–1968	Succeeded by George Henry Speltz
