= Peregrine (martyr) =

St. Peregrine

martyr
- Died: August 25, 192; Rome
- Venerated in: Roman Catholic Church
- Major shrine: Saint John's Abbey, Collegeville Minnesota
- Feast: August 25 (Martyrdom); May 6 (Translation)
- Attributes: Chi Rho on his chest, in a dungeon with the rack, the scourge, clubs or fire's flames

St. Peregrine (Latin: Peregrinus) the martyr was an early Christian martyr who died because he and fellow Christians refused to worship the Roman Emperor Commodus on his birthday.

His remains are buried in the Saint John's Abbey in Collegeville, Minnesota.
