= Patrick Neary =

American Roman Catholic prelate

His Excellency, The Most Reverend Patrick Neary CSC
- Bishop of Saint Cloud
- Diocese: Saint Cloud
- Appointed: December 15, 2022
- Installed: February 14, 2023
- Predecessor: Donald Kettler

Orders
- Ordination: April 6, 1991 by Paul E. Waldschmidt
- Consecration: February 14, 2023 by Bernard Hebda, Peter Leslie Smith, and William Albert Wack

Personal details
- Born: Patrick Michael Neary; March 6, 1963 (age 63) La Porte, Indiana, US
- Education: University of Notre Dame; Jesuit School of Theology
- Motto: Ave crux, spes unica (Hail the cross, our only hope)

Styles of Patrick Michael Neary
- Reference style: His Excellency; The Most Reverend
- Spoken style: Your Excellency
- Religious style: Bishop

Patrick Michael Neary, C.S.C. (born March 6, 1963) is an American Catholic prelate who has served as Bishop of Saint Cloud since 2023. He previously worked as a missionary priest in Chile, Kenya and Uganda; held leadership positions in the Congregation of Holy Cross and served in various pastoral assignments in the United States.

== Biography ==
=== Early life ===
Patrick Neary was born on March 6, 1963, in La Porte, Indiana, the oldest of six children of Jacob and Marybelle Neary. He joined the CSC and, as a seminarian, attended the University of Notre Dame, earning a bachelor's degree in history in 1985. He then earned a Master of Divinity degree at the Jesuit School of Theology in Berkeley, California. Neary took his final vows as a CSC religious priest in September 1990.

=== Priesthood ===
Neary was ordained a priest at the Basilica of the Sacred Heart in Notre Dame, Indiana for the CSC on April 6, 1991, by Bishop Paul Edward Waldschmidt.

After his ordination, the CSC assigned Neary as the parish vicar of Saint John Vianney Parish in Goodyear, Arizona, from 1990 to 1994. He returned to Notre Dame in 1994 to an appointment as a chaplain at the university, serving Hispanic students in the ROTC program. Neary was appointed vice-rector of the Moreau Seminary at Notre Dame in 2000, serving there until 2004. In 2003, he was named a member of the CSC Provincial Council of Indiana.

In 2010, Neary moved to Kenya to serve as director of the McCauley House of Formation in Nairobi. After one year, the CSC moved him to the position of Superior of the District of East Africa.

In 2018, after eight years in East Africa, the CSC transferred Neary to the role of pastor of Holy Redeemer Parish in Portland, Oregon.

=== Bishop of Saint Cloud ===
On December 15, 2022, Pope Francis named Neary as bishop of Saint Cloud. He received his episcopal consecration at the Cathedral of Saint Mary in St. Cloud on February 14, 2023, from Archbishop Bernard Hebda, with Auxiliary Bishop Peter Smith and Bishop William Wack serving as co-consecrators.

==== Joseph Paul Herzing controversy ====
In June 2023, Neary allowed St Cloud priest Joseph Paul Herzing, who had been placed on leave since October 2022 after the Diocese of St. Cloud learned that about a report which involved him allegedly sexually abusing a woman who he gave spiritual counseling to from 2018 to 2022, to return to work with limited responsibilities at four parishes in Cold Spring, Rockville, Richmond, and Jacobs Prairie. Despite the abuse allegation, Neary would also promote Herzing to serve as pastor of five parishes in Browerville, Clarissa, Grey Eagle, Long Prairie, and Swanville. St. Cloud police began investigating the 2022 abuse allegations against Neary in August 2024. When Neary learned about the police investigation in September 2024, he allowed Herzing to continue serving as pastor with restrictions and monitoring. Herzing would not be placed on leave again until charges where filed against him in November 2024. In December 2025, Herzing appeared in court for the first time after being charged with one count of third-degree criminal sexual conduct, one count of stalking, and three counts of threats of violence.

Catholic Church titles
Preceded by Donald Kettler	Bishop of Saint Cloud; 2023–present	Incumbent
