= James Trobec =

Slovenian-born American prelate

His Excellency, The Most Reverend James Trobec
- Bishop of Saint Cloud
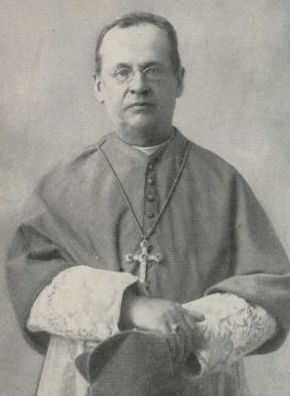
- Church: Catholic Church
- Diocese: Diocese of Saint Cloud
- Appointed: July 5, 1897
- Term ended: April 15, 1914
- Predecessor: Martin Marty
- Successor: Joseph Francis Busch

Orders
- Ordination: September 8, 1865 by Thomas Grace
- Consecration: September 21, 1897 by John Ireland

Personal details
- Born: July 10, 1838 Log pri Polhovem Gradcu, Slovenia
- Died: December 14, 1921 (aged 83) Brockway, Minnesota, U.S.

James Trobec (July 10, 1838 – December 14, 1921) was a Slovenian-born American prelate of the Catholic Church. He served as the third Bishop of Saint Cloud from 1897 to 1914.

== Biography ==
=== Early life ===
Trobec was baptized Jakob Trobez on July 10, 1838, in Log pri Polhovem Gradcu, then part of the Austrian Empire. His parents were listed as Matthæus Trobez, a farmer, and Helena Pezhovnik. Three of his nephews also became priests in Minnesota: John Trobec, Joseph Trobec, and John Seliškar.

Trobec received his early education at the parochial school of Polhov Gradec and continued his studies at the Bežigrad Gymnasium in Ljubljana. He began his studies for the priesthood in Ljubljana, but in 1864 he and fifteen other seminarians were recruited by Rev. Francis Xavier Pierz to serve as missionaries in the United States. After his arrival in the spring of 1864, he finished his theological studies at Saint Vincent Seminary in Latrobe, Pennsylvania.

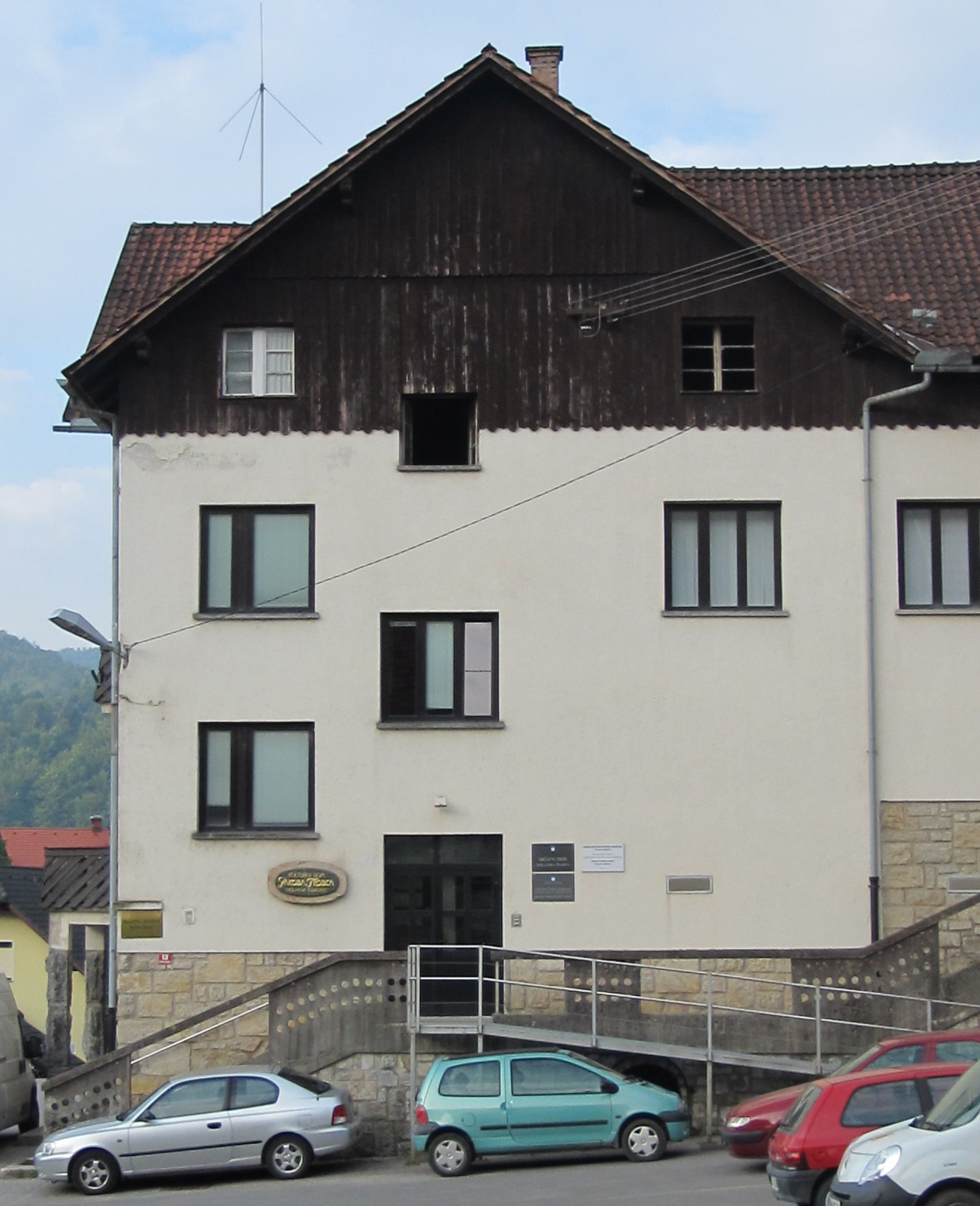
The James Trobec Arts Center in Polhov Gradec

=== Priesthood ===
Trobec then went to Minnesota and was ordained a priest on September 8, 1865, by Bishop Thomas Grace in Saint Paul. After his ordination, he served as an assistant pastor in Belle Prairie, Minnesota. In October 1866, he was appointed pastor of Saint Felix Parish in Wabasha, Minnesota and the surrounding missions. At Wabasha, he established a new parochial school that was staffed by the School Sisters of Notre Dame and completed construction on a new church in 1874.

In October 1887, Trobec was assigned to organize and lead a new parish, the Church of St. Agnes, for German-speaking immigrants in Saint Paul. This required building a new church, school, convent, and rectory. Trobec laid the cornerstone for the church in November 1887 and it was dedicated by Archbishop John Ireland in September 1888. The parochial school also opened its doors in 1888, under the direction of the School Sisters of Notre Dame. By 1897, the parish's continued growth required a larger church. Construction on a new building began in April 1897 but Trobec received a new appointment before he could see it completed.

=== Bishop of Saint Cloud ===
On July 5, 1897, Trobec was named by Pope Leo XIII to succeed the late Martin Marty as bishop of the Diocese of Saint Cloud. He received his episcopal consecration on September 21, 1897, from Archbishop Ireland, with Archbishop Frederick Katzer and Bishop John Vertin serving as co-consecrators, at the Cathedral of Saint Paul.

Trobec led the diocese through a time of growth, with a particular focus on priestly vocations and Catholic education. By 1911, the Catholic population grew by 25,000, the number of priests and parishes both increased by 35, and there were two more hospitals.

=== Retirement and legacy ===
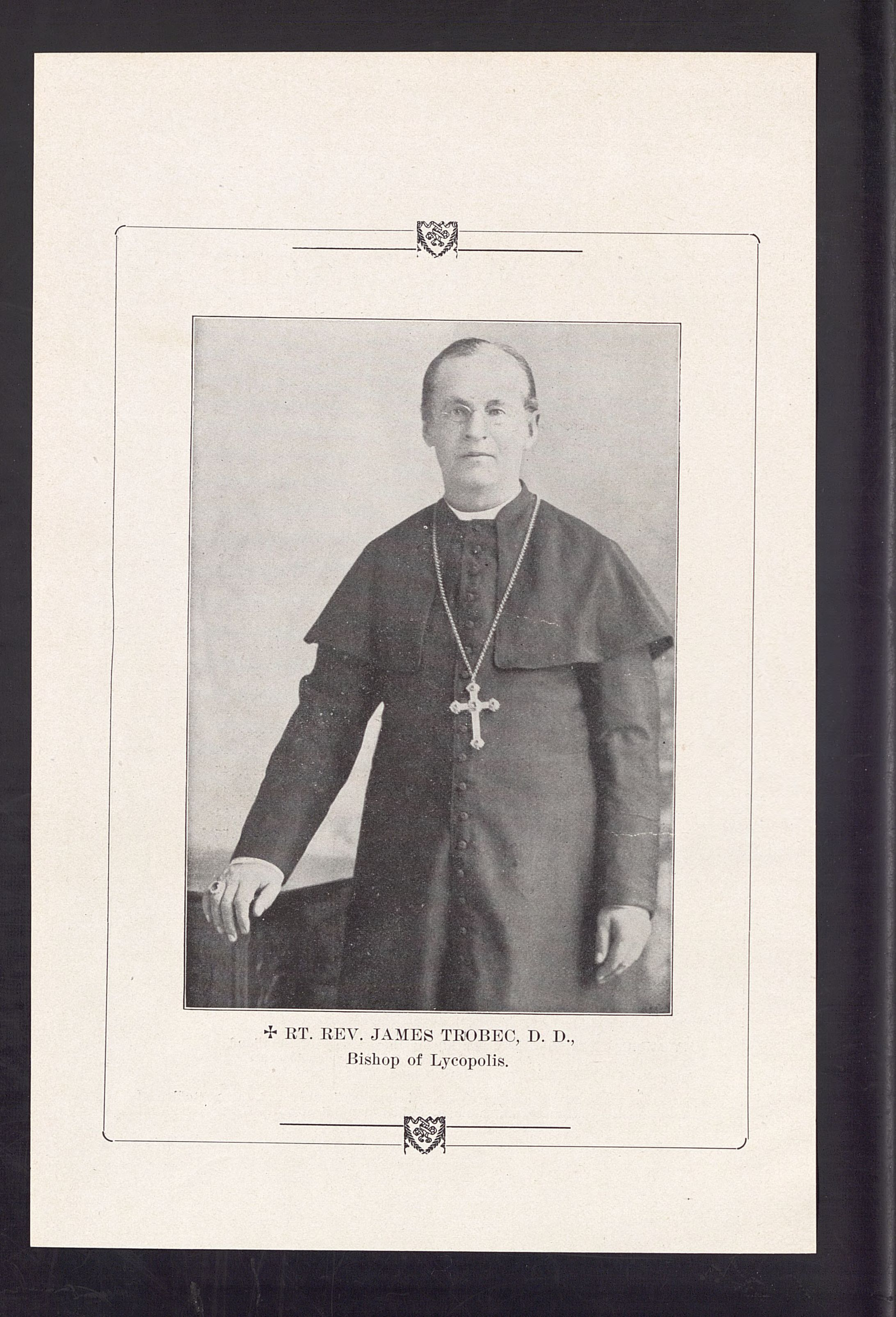
Rt. Rev. James Trobec, Bishop of Lycopolis, from My Message, Official Organ of the Diocese of St. Cloud (St. Cloud, Minnesota), Volume 1, Number 3.

Due to ill health, Trobec submitted his resignation to the Vatican as bishop of Saint Cloud on April 15, 1914, and it was accepted by Pope Pius X the following June. He was then given the titular see of Lycopolis. Trobec spent his retirement living with his sisters at the rectory of the Church of St. Stephen Parish in St. Stephen, Minnesota, where his nephew was pastor. James Trobec died there on December 14, 1921, at age 83.

The James Trobec Arts Center (Slovene: Kulturni dom Jakoba Trobca) in Polhov Gradec, Slovenia is named for him.

Catholic Church titles
Preceded by Martin Marty	Bishop of St. Cloud; 1897–1914	Succeeded by Joseph Francis Busch
