= Martin Marty (bishop) =

Swiss-born Benedictine missionary and bishop

His Excellency, The Right Reverend Martin Marty O.S.B.
- Bishop of Saint Cloud
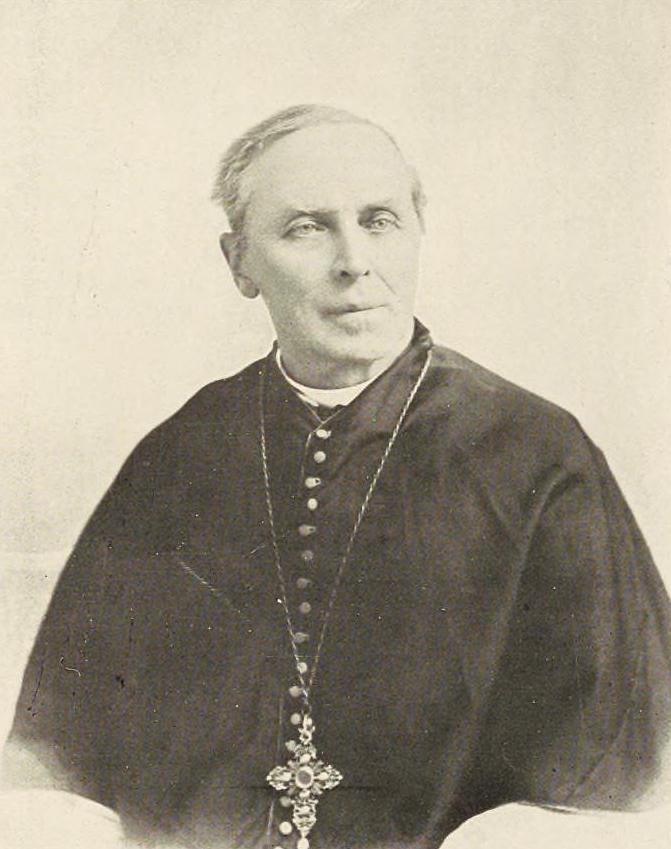
- Native name: James Joseph Alois Marty
- Church: Catholic
- Diocese: Diocese of St. Cloud
- Predecessor: John Joseph Frederick Otto Zardetti
- Successor: James Trobec

Orders
- Ordination: September 14, 1856 by Johann Peter Mirer
- Consecration: February 1, 1880 by Silas Chatard

Personal details
- Born: January 12, 1834 Schwyz, Switzerland
- Died: September 19, 1896 (aged 62) Saint Cloud, Minnesota, US

Martin Marty OSB (born James Joseph Alois Marty; January 12, 1834 – September 19, 1896) was a Swiss-born Benedictine missionary and Catholic bishop in the United States.

Marty was the first abbot of Saint Meinrad Archabbey in Indiana; the first vicar Apostolic of Dakota Territory, where he ministered to the Lakota Sioux; and the second bishop of Saint Cloud in Minnesota His zeal for the Native American missions earned him the title, "The Apostle of the Sioux".

== Biography ==
=== Early life ===
James Marty was born in Canton Schwyz, Switzerland, on January 12, 1834, the son of a shoemaker and church sexton and his wife. Before age two, he severely burned his mouth and face when trying to drink from a bottle of acid in his father's shop. The acid caused swelling that nearly suffocated him; it left his face permanently disfigured.

After graduating from the Jesuit-run gymnasium in his hometown, Marty was granted a musical scholarship to the Jesuit college at Fribourg, Switzerland. While there, he learned about the work of Reverend Pierre De Smet, a Jesuit missionary in the Western United States. De Smet inspired Marty to become a priest and serve as a missionary to the Native Americans.

After the Sonderbund War of 1847 between Catholic and Protestant cantons, the Swiss Confederation expelled the Jesuits from the country, but allowed the Benedictine Order to remain. On December 21, 1847, Marty enrolled at the Benedictine school attached to Einsiedeln Abbey. After his graduation, Marty entered the Benedictine novitiate at age 20; he took his final vows on May 29, 1855, assuming the name Brother Martin Marty.

=== Priesthood ===
Marty was ordained to the priesthood for the Benedictines at Einsiedeln Abbey by Bishop Johann Peter Mirer on September 14, 1856. In 1859, the Benedictines assigned him to teach moral theology at the abbey.

In 1860, Abbot Heinrich Schmid von Baar sent Marty to the United States for one year to manage the Benedictine Saint Meinrad monastery at St. Meinrad, Indiana. Marty succeeded in reducing Saint Meinrad's debt, saving it from dissolution. Schmid von Baar decided to designate Marty as its permanent leader. When Saint Meinrad was established as a conventual priory five years later, Marty was selected as the first prior.

=== First Abbot of Saint Meinrad Abbey ===
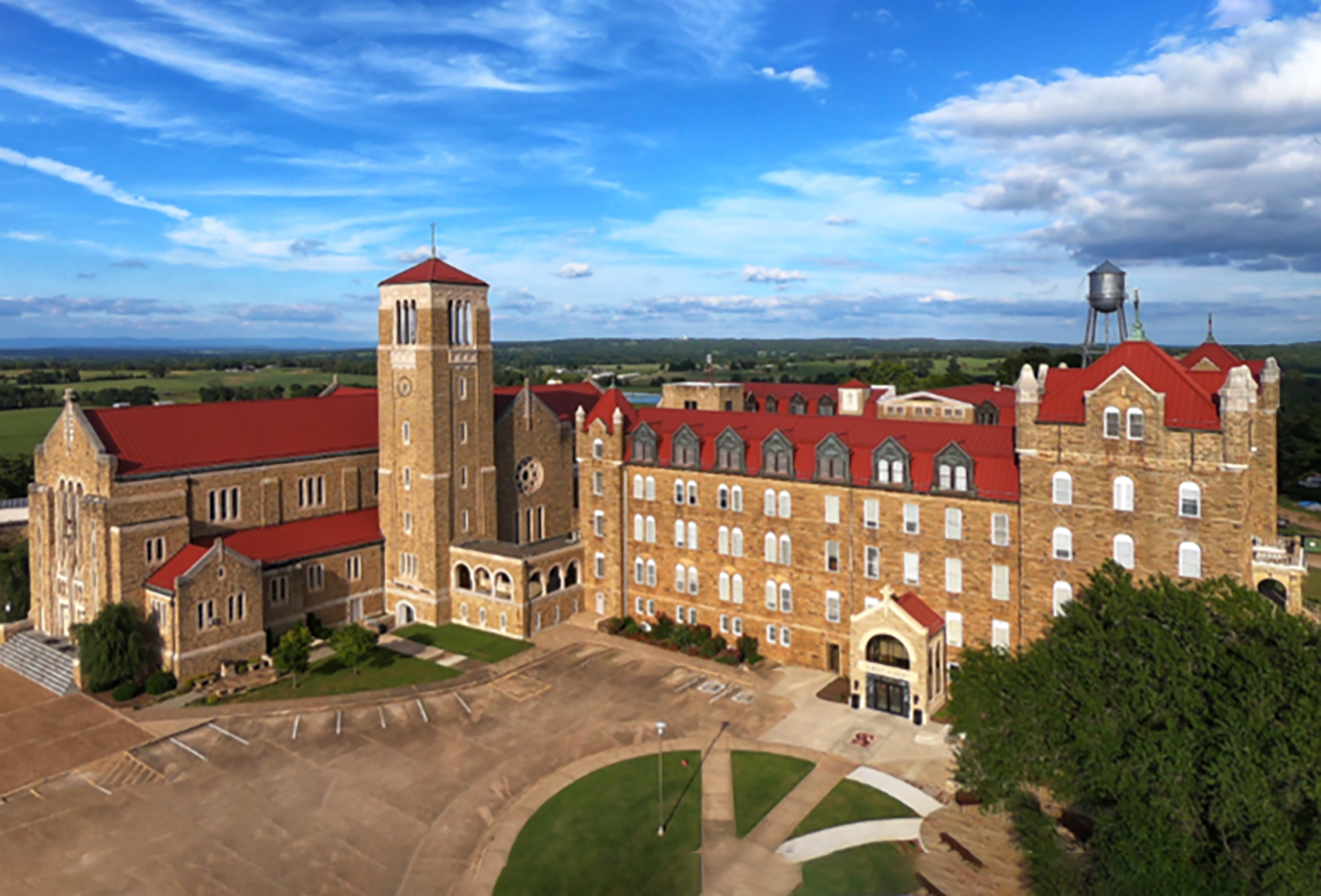
Subiaco Abbey, Logan County, Arkansas (2010)

On September 30, 1870, Saint Meinrad was upgraded to an independent abbey by Pope Pius IX. In January 1872, Marty was elected as its first abbot. The investiture ceremony in May 1872 was conducted by Bishop Jacques-Maurice de Saint Palais and Abbot Boniface Wimmer.

In 1875, Marty instituted a change in the devotional practice of the St. Meinrad Abbey, substituting the Roman Breviary for the Benedictine Breviary. When this policy caused a major uproar, the dispute was referred to the Sacred Congregation of Rites in Rome. On March 9, 1876, word reached Marty that the Congregation had ruled against him and ordered him to reinstate the Traditional Breviary. Although Marty immediately obeyed, he would always feel that he had undergone a "temporary defeat" in his dream of drawing the Benedictine Order closer to diocesan clergy, who used the Roman Breviary. His failure would leave him disheartened with life at St. Meinrad and anxious to obtain a new pastorate.

During Marty's tenure as abbot, he initiated an agreement with the Little Rock and Fort Smith Railroad (LR&FS). The LR&FS had been soliciting German Catholics to move to Arkansas. To serve this population, the railroad offered the Benedictines 640 acres (2.6 km^{2}) of land to establish a monastery and an additional 100 acres (0.40 km^{2}) to found a convent. Marty founded St. Benedict's Priory in Logan County, Arkansas, in 1878, with three monks from St. Meinrad Archabbey. An additional monk and eight postulant for the monastery arrived from Switzerland the following year. This monastery became independent in 1886, as a conventual priory, and in 1891 it was raised by the pope as an abbey, to be known as Subiaco Abbey.

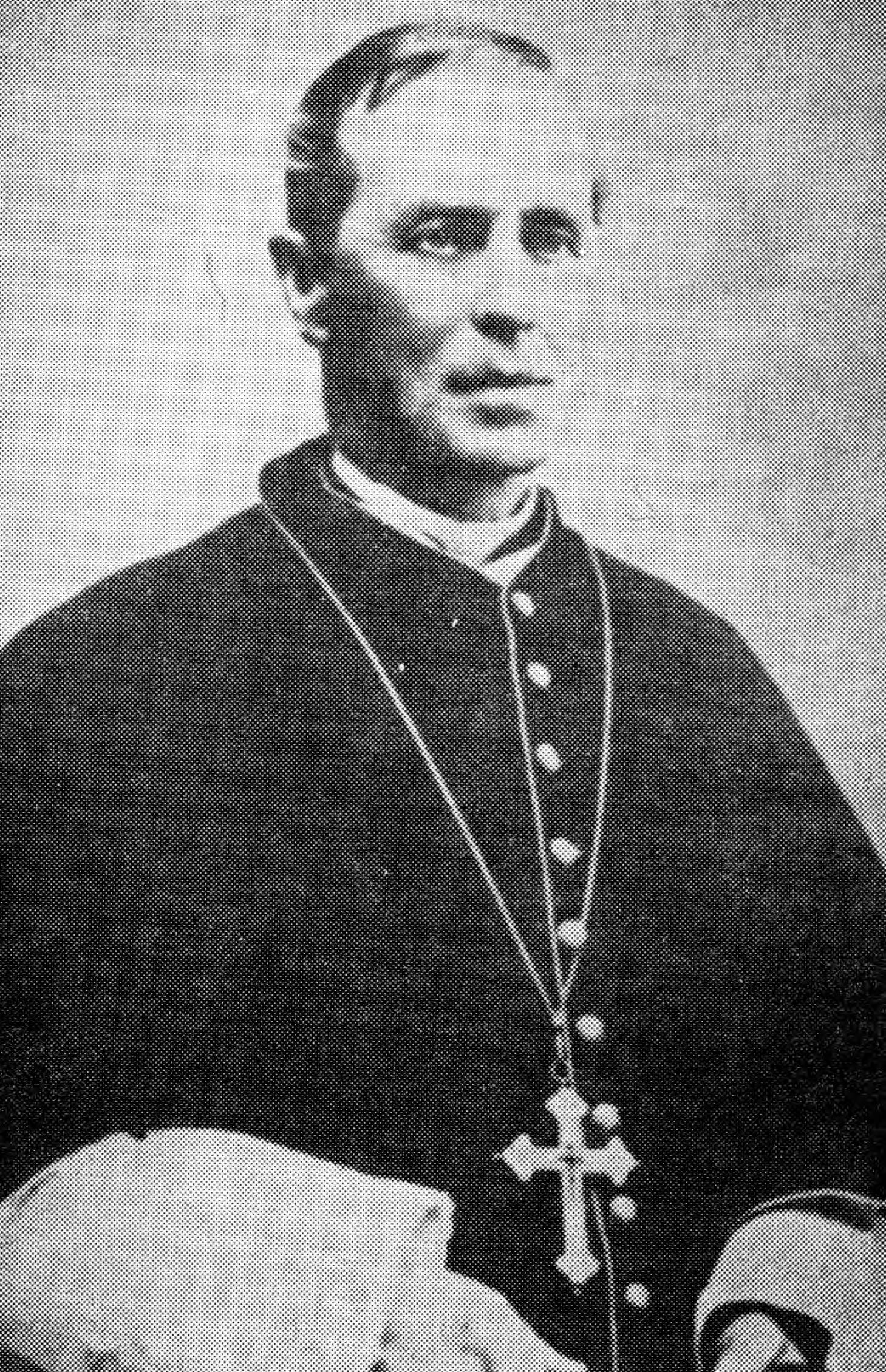
Bishop Marty, circa 1880s

=== Vicar Apostolic of Dakota Territory ===
In July 1876, Marty departed Indiana by steamer for Standing Rock in the Dakota Territory, along the upper Missouri River, where he intended to found a Benedictine monastery to assist the Lakota people.

On August 12, 1879, Pope Leo XIII appointed Marty as vicar apostolic of the Dakota Territory; he was consecrated bishop on February 1, 1880, by Bishop Silas Chatard and named titular bishop of Tiberias. Marty then resigned as abbot of Saint Meinrad.Marty worked among the Lakota people living on the Standing Rock Reservation in North and South Dakota. The Hunkpapa Sioux called him "Black Robe Lean Chief".

The area was first under the jurisdiction of the Apostolic Vicariate of Nebraska. As the Dakota Territory had only 12 Catholic priests, Marty actively recruited priests from the Eastern United States and Europe. In 1880 Marty persuaded Benedictine sisters from Missouri to assist him at Fort Yates, a mission among the Yankton Sioux.

In 1884, Marty attended the Third Plenary Council in Baltimore, Maryland. He served on the committee to establish the Catholic University of America in Washington, D.C. Marty was appointed president of the Bureau of Catholic Indian Missions.

=== Bishop of Sioux Falls ===
On November 26, 1889, Pope Leo XIII appointed Marty as the first bishop of the new Diocese of Sioux Falls, which, at that time, comprised all of South Dakota.

=== Bishop of Saint Cloud ===
Leo XIII appointed Marty as bishop of St. Cloud on January 18, 1895, even though Marty was already quite ill. Martin Marty died on September 19, 1896, at age 62.

=== Legacy ===
The town of Marty, South Dakota, and Mount Marty University in Yankton, South Dakota are named after Marty. There is a statute of Marty at Saint Meinrad Archabbey.

== Quote ==
- "Happy would I be if I could sacrifice for God what Custer threw away to the world."

Catholic Church titles
| Preceded by John Joseph Frederick Otto Zardetti | Bishop of St. Cloud; 1895–1896 | Succeeded by James Trobec |
