= Donald Joseph Kettler =

American prelate

His Excellency, The Most Reverend Donald Joseph Kettler
- Bishop Emeritus of Saint Cloud
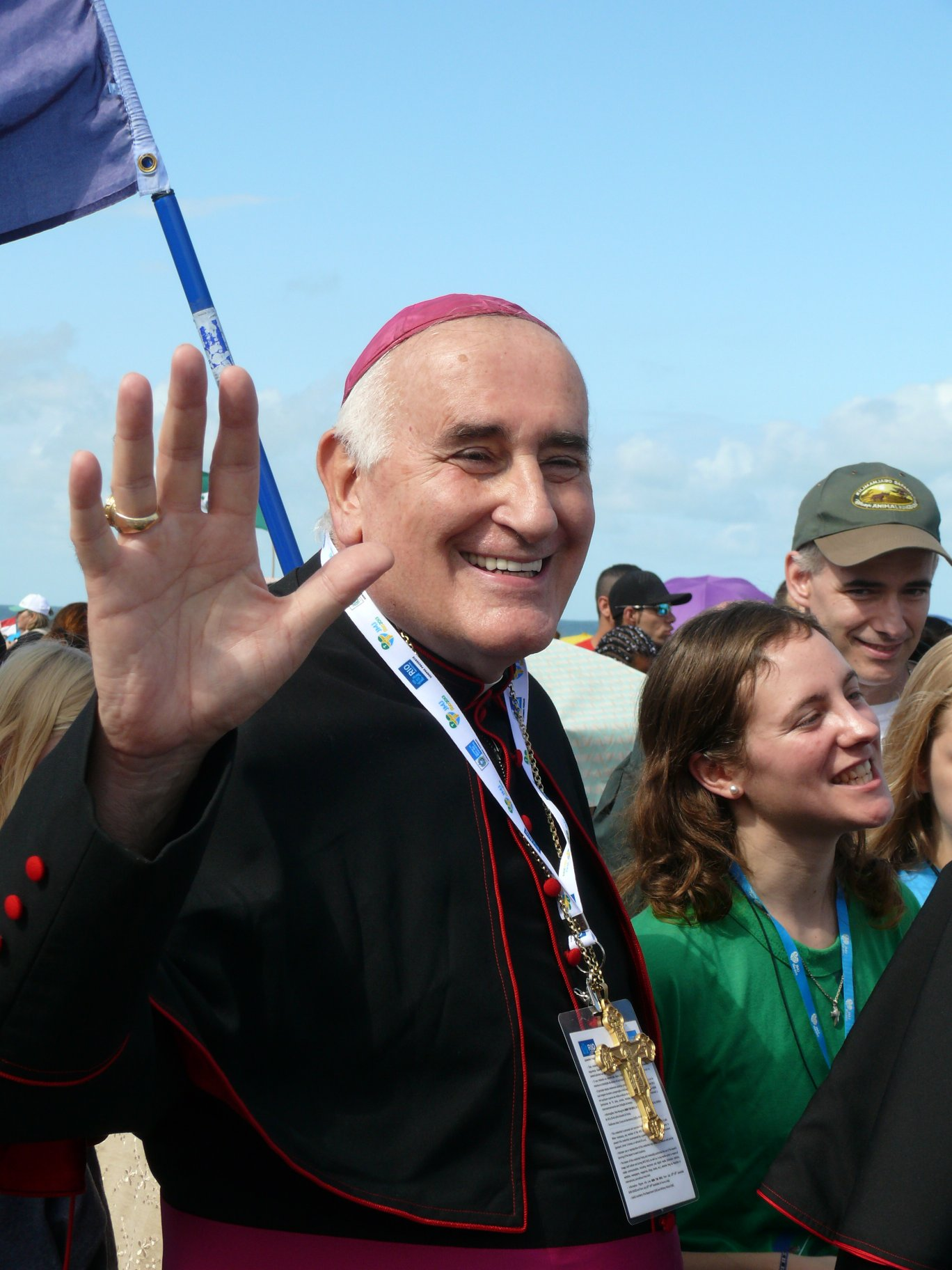
- Bishop Kettler in Rio de Janeiro in 2013
- Archdiocese: Saint Paul and Minneapolis
- Diocese: Saint Cloud
- Appointed: September 20, 2013
- Installed: November 7, 2013
- Retired: December 15, 2022
- Predecessor: John Francis Kinney
- Successor: Patrick Neary
- Previous post: Bishop of Fairbanks (2002–2013)

Orders
- Ordination: May 29, 1970 by Lambert Anthony Hoch
- Consecration: August 22, 2002 by Roger Lawrence Schwietz, Michael William Warfel, and Robert James Carlson

Personal details
- Born: November 26, 1944 (age 81) Minneapolis, Minnesota, US
- Denomination: Roman Catholic Church
- Motto: Faith, hope and love

Styles of Donald Joseph Kettler
- Reference style: His Excellency; The Most Reverend
- Spoken style: Your Excellency
- Religious style: Bishop

Donald Joseph Kettler (born November 26, 1944) is an American prelate of the Catholic Church. He served as bishop of the Diocese of St. Cloud from 2013 to 2022. Kettler previously served as bishop of the Diocese of Fairbanks from 2002 to 2013.

== Biography ==
=== Early life ===
Donald Kettler was born on November 26, 1944, in Minneapolis, Minnesota, to Norbert Joseph 'Joe' Kettler and Marguerite Raiche. His family later moved to Sioux Falls, South Dakota, where Kettler and his three siblings (Jim, Beth, and Kathleen) were raised. He received undergraduate and divinity degrees at Saint John's University in Collegeville, Minnesota.

=== Priesthood ===
Kettler was ordained to the priesthood at St. Joseph's Church in Sioux Falls by Bishop Lambert Hoch for the Diocese of Sioux Falls on May 29, 1970. After his ordination, the diocese assigned Kettler as an associate pastor in parishes in Aberdeen, South Dakota, and Sioux Falls. In 1979, he left the parishes to begin coordinating work for the diocesan offices in Sioux Falls. In 1981, Kettler entered the Catholic University of America School of Canon Law in Washington, D.C., obtaining his Licentiate of Canon Law. After returning to South Dakota in 1983, he was named judicial vicar and resumed his work coordinating diocesan offices from 1984 to 1987. During this time, he also began celebrating a weekly televised mass.

After serving as rector of St. Joseph's Cathedral from 1987 to 1995, the diocese named Kettler as pastor of St. Lambert Parish from 1995 to 2000, and of Christ the King Parish from 2000 to 2002, all in Sioux Falls. Kettler also served on the Sioux Falls Diocesan Finance Council and the Stewardship Committee. He was a board member for Catholic Family Services, the Association of Christian Churches of South Dakota and the Sioux Falls Catholic School System.

=== Bishop of Fairbanks ===
On June 7, 2002, Kettler was appointed the fourth bishop of Fairbanks by Pope John Paul II. He received his episcopal consecration at the Carlson Center in Fairbanks, Alaska, on August 22, 2002, from Archbishop Roger Schwietz, with Bishops Michael Warfel and Robert Carlson serving as co-consecrators.

After a public announcement three weeks earlier, the diocese filed for Chapter 11 bankruptcy, following unsuccessful negotiations to settle dozens of sexual abuse claims, on March 1, 2008. It became the sixth Catholic diocese in the United States to go bankrupt.

=== Bishop of St. Cloud ===
Pope Francis named Kettler as bishop of St. Cloud on September 20, 2013. He was installed as the ninth bishop on November 7, 2013.

On May 26, 2020, as part of a bankruptcy plan, the diocese agreed to pay $22.5 million to 70 victims of sexual abuse by diocesan clergy. The same day, Kettler issued an apology to the victims for the harm they suffered, and said he remained committed to "assist in the healing of all those who have been hurt."

On December 15, 2022, Francis accepted Kettler's resignation as bishop of St. Cloud after he surpassed the retirement age of 75.

=== Bishop of Sioux Falls (Temporary Administration) ===
On May 1, 2025, a letter from Reverend Andrew Young, the Vicar General of the Diocese of Sioux Falls, made an announcement that Kettler will come out of retirement to fulfill the duties of Bishop Donald DeGrood who had fallen ill. Kettler ended his temporary position and DeGrood was reinstated on August 13, 2025.

== See also ==
- Catholic Church hierarchy
- Catholic Church in the United States
- Historical list of the Catholic bishops of the United States
- List of Catholic bishops of the United States
- Lists of patriarchs, archbishops, and bishops

Catholic Church titles
Preceded by John Francis Kinney	Bishop of St. Cloud; 2013–2022	Succeeded by Patrick Neary
Preceded by Michael Joseph Kaniecki, SJ	Bishop of Fairbanks; 2002–2013	Succeeded by Chad Zielinski
