= Bellechester, Minnesota =

City in Minnesota, United States

Bellechester
- City
- Location of Bellechester, Minnesota
- Coordinates: 44°22′15″N 92°30′43″W
- Country: United States
- State: Minnesota
- Counties: Goodhue, Wabasha

Area
  - Total: 0.32 sq mi (0.82 km^{2})
  - Land: 0.32 sq mi (0.82 km^{2})
  - Water: 0 sq mi (0.00 km^{2})
- Elevation: 1,112 ft (339 m)

Population (2020)
  - Total: 176
  - Density: 556/sq mi (214.8/km^{2})
- Time zone: UTC-6 (Central (CST))
  - Summer (DST): UTC-5 (CDT)
- FIPS code: 27-04798
- GNIS feature ID: 0639895
- Website: bellechestermn.com

Bellechester is a city in Goodhue and Wabasha counties in the U.S. state of Minnesota. As of the 2020 census, Bellechester had a population of 176. Most of Bellechester is in Goodhue County, with only a small part extending into Wabasha County.

== History ==
Bellechester was laid out in 1877, and named for its location in Chester Township, belle being derived from French meaning "beautiful". A post office was established on the Wabasha County side in 1879.

Bellechester was a railway shipping point of pottery clay.

== Geography ==
According to the United States Census Bureau, the city has a total area of 0.31 square miles (0.80 km^{2}), all land.

County 2 Boulevard, County 16 Boulevard, and Wabasha County Road 7 are the main routes in the community.

== Demographics ==
Historical population
Census	Pop.	Note	%±
1960	184		—
1970	199		8.2%
1980	220		10.6%
1990	110		−50.0%
2000	172		56.4%
2010	175		1.7%
2020	176		0.6%
U.S. Decennial Census

=== 2010 census ===
As of the census of 2010, there were 175 people, 75 households, and 47 families living in the city. The population density was 564.5 inhabitants per square mile (218.0/km^{2}). There were 79 housing units at an average density of 254.8 units per square mile (98.4 units/km^{2}). The racial makeup of the city was 90.9% White, 8.6% from other races, and 0.6% from two or more races. Hispanic or Latino of any race were 10.3% of the population.

There were 75 households, of which 28.0% had children under the age of 18 living with them, 44.0% were married couples living together, 8.0% had a female householder with no husband present, 10.7% had a male householder with no wife present, and 37.3% were non-families. 30.7% of all households were made up of individuals, and 16% had someone living alone who was 65 years of age or older. The average household size was 2.33 and the average family size was 2.85.

The median age in the city was 37.5 years. 24% of residents were under the age of 18; 7.5% were between the ages of 18 and 24; 25.7% were from 25 to 44; 25.8% were from 45 to 64; and 17.1% were 65 years of age or older. The gender makeup of the city was 52.6% male and 47.4% female.

=== 2000 census ===
As of the census of 2000, there were 172 people, 78 households, and 41 families living in the city. The population density was 543.6 inhabitants per square mile (209.9/km^{2}). There were 78 housing units at an average density of 246.5 units per square mile (95.2 units/km^{2}). The racial makeup of the city was 98.26% White, 1.16% Native American, and 0.58% from two or more races. Hispanic or Latino of any race were 1.74% of the population.

There were 78 households, out of which 26.9% had children under the age of 18 living with them, 39.7% were married couples living together, 10.3% had a female householder with no husband present, and 46.2% were non-families. 39.7% of all households were made up of individuals, and 14.1% had someone living alone who was 65 years of age or older. The average household size was 2.21 and the average family size was 2.98.

In the city, the population was spread out, with 24.4% under the age of 18, 10.5% from 18 to 24, 26.7% from 25 to 44, 21.5% from 45 to 64, and 16.9% who were 65 years of age or older. The median age was 37 years. For every 100 females, there were 91.1 males. For every 100 females age 18 and over, there were 94.0 males.

The median income for a household in the city was $33,333, and the median income for a family was $41,250. Males had a median income of $24,375 versus $24,107 for females. The per capita income for the city was $19,927. None of the families and 5.2% of the population were living below the poverty line, including no under eighteens and 5.7% of those over 64.

== Notable person ==
- Peter William Bartholome, Roman Catholic Bishop
