= Saint John's Preparatory School (Minnesota) =

School in Collegeville, Minnesota, US

Location
- Box 4000 2280 Watertower Road; Collegeville, (Stearns County), Minnesota 56321; United States; 45°34′49″N 94°23′17″W

Information
- Type: Private, college-prep, day and boarding school
- Religious affiliation: Roman Catholic
- Patron saint: Saint Benedict
- Established: 1857
- Founder: Saint John's Abbey
- Grades: 6–12
- Gender: Coeducational
- Age: 12 to 19
- Average class size: 16
- Student to teacher ratio: 11:1
- Campus size: 2,700 acres
- Colors: Cardinal red and Carolina blue
- Fight song: Fight, Johnnies
- Athletics conference: Prairie Conference
- Nickname: Johnnies
- Team name: Johnnies
- Accreditation: North Central Association of Colleges and Schools
- National ranking: 33
- Publication: The Prep World
- Newspaper: The Prep Post
- Yearbook: The Pine Curtain
- Graduates: 12.8%
- Website: www.sjprep.net

Saint John's Preparatory School (SJP) is a Catholic co-educational, day and boarding college preparatory school located in Collegeville, Minnesota. Founded in 1856, it is located in the Diocese of Saint Cloud and is administered by the Benedictine monks of Saint John's Abbey. The school includes a middle school consisting of grades 6–8 and an upper school consisting of grades 9–12. The student body consists of students from the local area along with 5- and 7-day boarding students from across the United States and around the world. In the 2025-26 academic year, the student body included students from 28 different cities and towns in Minnesota, 4 states and 14 different countries.

== Background ==
Saint John's Preparatory School was established in 1857 by the monks of Saint John's Abbey, a Benedictine monastery located in Collegeville, MN. SJP is the oldest secondary school in Minnesota. It was all-male until 1972 when the nearby all-girls school, St. Benedict's Academy owned and operated by the Sisters of St. Benedict's Monastery in St. Joseph, MN closed. The college sections of both schools are still in operation and run as partnered liberal arts institutions.

The current Head of School is Jon McGee, succeeding the long-time headmaster, Father Jonathan Lizardi, O.S.B.

== Academics ==
Saint John's Prep is a college preparatory school with studies in the fine arts, language arts, and sciences. Listed among the top 20 boarding schools (out of 307 schools) for: Student Test Scores - High average SAT scores.

=== College classes ===
Saint John's Prep shares its 2,700 acres (1,100 ha) campus with Saint John's University, a small, liberal arts university, which is affiliated with the nearby College of Saint Benedict. Each semester, 10-20 students take at least one college class at SJU or CSB.

=== Exchange programs ===
Saint John's Prep offers a year-long study abroad opportunity with the Benedictine Gymnasium in Melk, Austria.

=== Athletic facilities ===
Prep uses several athletic facilities on the SJU campus, including Clemens Stadium – the current home of the Track and Field team, with a 400m track and a separate location for shot-put and discus. The Natural Bowl is also the former home of the Football team. (Football has recently been co-oped with St. Cloud Technical Senior School.)

== Notable alumni ==
- Mathew Ahmann – civil rights activist
- David Durenberger – American politician and former Republican member of the U.S. Senate
- Eugene McCarthy – American politician, poet, and longtime member of the United States Congress
- George Sinner – former governor of North Dakota and Vice President of American Crystal Sugar
- Peter Strzok – former FBI agent
