= Frank Kacmarcik =

American artist and calligrapher

Frank Thomas Kacmarcik (12 March 1920 - 22 February 2004) was an American artist, designer, calligrapher, liturgical consultant, and collector of fine art and manuscripts. "Much of the progress that has been made in [religious] architecture and the arts in this country can be attributed to Frank Kacmarcik." Also "No one has had a greater influence on the development of American religious architecture and art in the past four decades than Frank Kacmarcik."

== Early years ==
Frank Kacmarcik was born March 13, 1920, in St. Paul, Minnesota, and grew up in North St Paul. His father had immigrated from Slovakia; his mother was born in Minnesota of Polish immigrants. His father worked as an upholsterer and refinisher of furniture.

== Art school and St. John's Abbey ==
Kacmarcik graduated from high school in 1938. Throughout his school years he was recognized as having artistic talent. Upon graduation he was offered a full-time scholarship at the Minneapolis School of Art (now Minneapolis College of Art and Design). While at art school he studied European monastic art and learned that some abbeys had non-ordained monks who were artists. He was a little surprised to discover there was Benedictine abbey in Minnesota, St. John's Abbey. Thinking that St. John's sounded like a place he could develop his interest in religious art, he wrote to the abbot who invited him to visit. Kacmarcik was so impressed that he asked to enter the abbey for a trial period. The abbot was a little reluctant, telling Kacmarcik he could not guarantee that he would be able to pursue his art in the abbey; but Kacmarcik was not deterred. He entered the abbey in August 1941.

During his time in the abbey Kacmarcik made many friends among the monks, but he also made "enemies" --- perhaps too strong a word to describe those who thought he would not make a good monk. He was not shy about voicing his opinions, often in blunt language. He regarded his honesty as a sign of integrity; however this was also seen as lacking in tolerance for other's opinion, a trait necessary for the communal life in the abbey. The monks voted not to renew his trial. He left St. John's Abbey, still on good terms with many of the monks, in October 1943.

== Army and further education ==
No longer having a draft exemption, Kacmarcik was drafted into the Army where he was sent to Europe as a Chaplain's Assistant. He also traveled extensively, visiting historic works of architecture, especially churches and monasteries. When the war ended, Kacmarcik was discharged and returned to the Minneapolis School of Art to complete his fourth year, 1946-47. Thanks to a scholarship and the G.I. Bill, Kacmarcik spent 1947-1950 in Europe, continuing his education at the Paris schools, Academie de la Grande Chaumiere and Centre d’Art Sacre, painting, traveling, and coming in contact with other artists producing contemporary religious art.

== Career ==
=== St. John's University ===
While in Europe Kacmarcik received an invitation from the president of St. John's University to join the faculty. (St. John's Abbey and St. John's University share the same campus in rural central Minnesota. At the time the abbot was also the president of St. John's University.) Kacmarcik began in September 1950. Although he was very disappointed at not being able to continue on to become a full-fledged member of the abbey, he had never broken off contact with some of the friends made during his time in the abbey as a novice monk. These monks were to be instrumental in smoothing Kacmarcik's dealings with the monk who was head of the art department and very anti—modern art. Eventually the department head and Kacmarcik developed a mutual respect for each other. Kacmarcik turned out to be a successful and popular teacher. He was a born educator. Although at times his methods might have seemed unconventional, his students responded to his views on what is art, what is sacred art, what is the vocation of the artist. But Kacmarcik's career as teacher at St. John's University was suddenly cut short.

Although Kacmarcik's return to the St. John's campus as a faculty member was a welcome one to his friends in the abbey, he still had his detractors among many of the monks. He had an apartment on campus which made it easy to meet with his monastic friends for social and serious conversation. However Kacmarcik seemed to have a talent for generating controversy wherever he went. His frank opinion about the designs for the new abbey church, given even when not asked for, did nothing to win over his detractors. His very presence on campus became a divisive issue among the monastic community. Kacmarcik was informed by the university he would be on the staff for the school year 1953-1954, but the Senior Advisory Council of the Abbey stepped in and overruled the university's decision. Even though the abbot was a personal friend of Kacmarcik's, the abbot thought it best to follow the Council's advice. It would be better for the monastic community if Kacmarcik left. However he lingered on in his campus apartment during the following year in hopes the university would find a way to rehire him. That did not happen and he moved to St. Paul, MN, in late 1954 to begin a career as a liturgical consultant for church architecture projects and graphic artist.

=== Liturgical consultant ===
An architect designing a church for a congregation that has a liturgy, such as Roman Catholicism, is faced with not only designing the exterior but also the interior. For the interior design there are decisions to be made, e.g. placement of the altar in relation to the congregation, where should the Blessed Sacrament be kept, how to provide for devotions to the saints, etc. Also there are directives from Rome concerning church architecture to consider. To cope with these decisions architects often call upon a liturgical consultant for assistance. Kacmarcik is usually credited with expanding the role of the liturgical consultant. In working with an architect he functioned, depending on the circumstances, as teacher, artist-maker, artist-designer, theologian, art consultant and coordinator. As liturgical consultant he regarded his role as being the one who "should act more as a teacher making the architect more than he would be if the consultant were not there the pastor more of a pastor, and the people’s role more active." Kacmarcik is recognized as being the "creator of new models for Roman Catholic liturgical space and furnishings."

Perhaps the most dramatic change in church interiors mandated by Vatican II was the directive that the priest is to say Mass facing the people. This usually meant moving the altar forward. Many church saw this as an opportunity to renovate which explains why many of Kacmarcik's projects were renovations of church interiors.

==== St. John's Abbey builds a church ====
In the early 1950s St. John's Abbey realized they needed a new church. An increase in vocations to the abbey after WWII had increased their members to over 300 (many were not in residence). Thanks to the G. I. Bill the enrollment of all male St. John's University had increased dramatically. The abbey church, built in the 19th century, was simply not adequate. The Abbey decided to build and they contacted several well-known architects inquiring if they would be interested in the church project. Several architects visited campus and made presentations why they should be chosen. The Abbey decided on New York based Marcel Breuer who was not a Catholic and who had never built church; however the community felt Breuer was a person who would listen to their concerns; someone they could work with.

==== Kacmarcik's contribution to the new church ====
From the beginning Kacmarcik was unofficially "very involved" in the new church project. He put himself forward as having studied the theology of the visual expression of the liturgy in art and architecture. He was informally consulted by members of the Building Committee as design topics came before them. In December, 1958 Kacmarcik was given a more official role when he was hired as liturgical and artistic consultant. In that role he made several trips to Breuer's office to discuss his concerns about how "Breuer’s architectural language could be used for sacred space" Throughout the planning process Breuer who was not a Catholic often called Kacmarcik for advice. Breuer wanted to understand the "function of the space as well as the supporting theological foundation" in order to aid him in getting things right.

In the lower level of the church the plans called for 34 private chapels to be used by the monks to say their daily Mass. Kacmarcik was asked to design the altar for 19 of these chapels. (Breur did the other 15 altars.) Each chapel had art work appropriate to the saint honored in that chapel. As part of the art committee Kacmarcik suggested artists to contact to furnish the art work for these chapels. He participated in furnishing the artists with background material on the saint, his or her relevance to the Benedictines and theological comments the committee thought might be useful to the artist. His work as an artist himself gave him an easy rapport working with the artists.

Early in the planning process one of the monks had written to Breuer : "I feel there should be someone consulted now in the early stages of the planning of the church on the possibilities of integrating painting, sculpture, etc, in the architectural masses in such a way that they will really belong to the building. Nothing happened. Breuer was busy with the outside of the building. Finally he contacted the abbot asking for help with the interior. The abbot suggest Kacmarcik and in January 1960 an art committee consisting of Kacmarcik and two monks was formed. Their responsibility was quite broad --- it covered "all new vestments, rugs and furnishings."

==== Other liturgical consultant work ====
Between 1947 and 2004 Kacmarcik was connected with 334 church related projects in some capacity. Some of the more his more successful projects are:

St. Francis de Sales, Muskegon, MI. Marcel Breuer, architect

Annunciation Priory, Bismarck, ND. Marcel Breuer, architect

St. Patrick’s Church, Oklahoma City, OK. "There is a mystical sense of transcendence in the space."

Church of St. John the Evangelist, Hopkins, MN. "Kacmarcik is especially proud of this project.""One of his [Kacmarcik] most highly regarded churches."

Abbey of Our Lady of New Melleray, Peosta, IA. "The overall effect of the renovation is powerful." "A Kacmarcik project of exceptionality and excellence.

Mepkin Abbey, Moncks Corner, SC. "The new church at Meplin Abbey in South Carolina is eminently successful from both architectural and liturgical points of view."

Church of St. Peter, Saratoga Springs, NY. "A prime example of an innovative renovation done well."

St. Boniface, Cold Spring, MN. "Shows a revisioning of liturgical space for the American Catholic that is more in keeping with the desires of the Church for the church."

St. Mary Church, Alexandria, MN. "Kacmarcik considers it one of his better churches."

Sacred Heart Chapel, Sisters of St. Benedict, St. Joseph, MN. "This renovation stands as a good example of the quality work of Kacmarcik and his creative ability in design."

St. Elizabeth Ann Seton, Carmel, IN. "For Kacmarcik, this work is one that he believes to be successful."

=== Other consulting ===
Kacmarcik also did some consulting for non-worship spaces. He worked on 22 projects---schools, houses, student housing, art museums, etc.

=== Graphic artist and book designer ===
Kacmarcik designed a variety of printed works from the covers for Worship, a periodical promoting the liturgical movement published by St. John's Abbey, from 1951 through the 1990s, to ephemera e.g. cards, stationery logos, etc. Gerard S. Sloyan says Kacmarcik's drawings "possess equal parts of discipline and fantasy [yet] force the viewer to ponder seriously the implications of the Christian mysteries that the drawings evoke."

Kacmarcik's worked as a book for a variety of publishers. Perhaps his best known designs are those done for Benziger Brothers, 1959-1975, during the period when Benziger Brothers issued new editions of liturgical book reflecting changes asked for by Vatican II. .He also did work for several other publishers, i.e. . Sheed and Ward, University of Chicago Press, P. J. Kennedy & Sons, Liturgical Press, and McGraw-Hill.

In 1955 Kacmarcik was one of forty-three internationally known book designers invited to participate in Liber Liborum, a Bible design project published by the Royal Library of Sweden.

=== Collector ===
In 1995 Kacmarcik donated his library of books, manuscripts and art works to St. John's where it is housed in the university library as a separate collection called Arca Artium. The rare book section consists of more than 4,000 volumes. There are examples of early printed books as well as examples of fine printing from the 19th and 20th century. The reference library section has 20,000 volumes. The art section more than 6,000 prints most of them prints originally connected with books. Prints by contemporary religious artists are also a strength. The Frank Kacmarcik Archives is part of Arca Artium.

== Influences ==
Early influences were his instructors at the Minneapolis School of Art, especially Alexander Masley and Frank Kofron. Later when he was a novice in the abbey Kacmarcik became acquainted with Brother Clement Frischauf, a member of community. Brother Clement was an internationally known artist of the German religious Beuronese tradition who influenced Kacmarcik's thinking about religious art and its relation to the liturgy Several architects were influential. American architect Ralph Adams Cram's beliefs in the "consistency, honesty, courage of courage of convictions, fastidiousness…willingness to accept only the best, the best materials, the best materials, the best workmanship, and above all the best art" became central to Kacmarcik's practice. In the 19th century Englishman Augustus Welby Pugin was one of the first architects to preach that architects should "integrate the various arts into a highly unified design," something Kacmarcik always strove for. Visually the minimalism of the Bauhaus movement and its emphasis on the total work of art appealed to him. His interest in the Bauhaus School was furthered by his contact with Marcel Breuer who before he immigrated to the United States had taught at the Bauhaus School in Germany. to the United States had taught at the Bauhaus school and who was the architect for the new St. John's Abbey church. Medieval art and architecture was also a source of inspiration for Kacmarcik.

In the graphic arts the influence of Byzantine icons and English engraver Eric Gill's work can be seen.

Among writers admired by Kacmarcik were Catholic philosopher Jacques Maritain and H. A. Reinhold, columnist and author of books on liturgical matters. Kacmarcik aligned himself with the writings of European leaders of the liturgical movement especially Pius Parsch and Romano Guardini. Their work in the United States is represented by St. John's Abbey which has a long history of being involved in the liturgical movement and is regarded as one of movement's leaders in the United States. Thus Kacmarcik's ties to the abbey were an important source of information and inspiration in his work as a liturgical consultant to architects.

== Awards and honors ==
Kacmarcik's work for architects garnered many awards from various groups. Over the years several groups have given him an award, not just once, but several times. Groups doing this include: the publication Liturgical Arts, National Council of Churches, American Institute of Architects Regional Honor Award, and American Institute of Architects National Award.

In 1978 Kacmarcik was made an honorary member of the American Institute of Architects and in 1995 the Institute gave him a 25-year award for "architectural excellence."

The North American Academy of Liturgy, an ecumenical association of liturgical scholars promoting research in public worship and extending this scholarship to benefit worshiping communities, awarded Kacmarcik its Berakah Award in 1981 in recognition for his "distinguished contribution to the professional work of the liturgy."

In the field of the graphic arts Kacmarcik has received more than sixty national and international awards.

Kacmarcik's alma mater, Minneapolis College of Art and Design, gave him an honorary Doctor of Fine Arts degree in 1970

== Later years ==
In 1986 Kacmarcik approached the abbot of St. John's Abbey about returning to live in the abbey as a claustral oblate. Many religious orders enroll people as oblates. (Oblates are persons who seek to integrate their daily life with the ideals of a religious order, in this case the Benedictines. Oblates look to the religious order for spiritual direction.) Normally oblates live in the world outside of an abbey; however Kacmarcik wished to live within the monastic community as a claustral oblate. The abbot sounded out the community about the advisability of taking in Kacmarcik before he was actually in residence. The vote was favorable and Kacmarcik received the Benedictine religious habit in 1988. He continued to do a little consultant and design work, especially for the Liturgical Press, the publishing arm of St. John's Abbey.

Kacmarcik died in his sleep February 22, 2004. He is buried in the abbey cemetery in a grave marked with a headstone of his design.

== Personality ==
Kacmarcik was a "Personality." Once met, not easily forgotten. He was above average height, well-built, and by most standards not handsome. He was blunt; he was opinionated; he was honest (on his terms) to a fault. But he was not bombastic. He was not pompous. He had a tendency to make pronouncements which many found stimulating and showing integrity; while others thought his pronouncements, often couched in colorful metaphors, as coming from an inflated ego. As a friend of Kacmarcik's remarked---his honesty "was not always accepted nor was it understood." At times he did not seem to care how his opinions were going to be received by other people. Yet at the same time he was willing to accept that some people were put off by his outspoken manner. Another called his criticism of artistic mediocrity "trenchant" And still another "acknowledged Kacmarcik’s ability to be an annoyance, a gadf...this type of counsel was able to open people’s eyes wider to a broader vision and spur them to action that would have far-reaching results." As Kacmarcik's long and successful career of working with architects and church building committees attests, he got results.

== See also ==
- Hill Museum & Manuscript Library
