= Saint John's Abbey, Collegeville =

Benedictine monastery in Collegeville Township, Minnesota

Saint John's Abbey
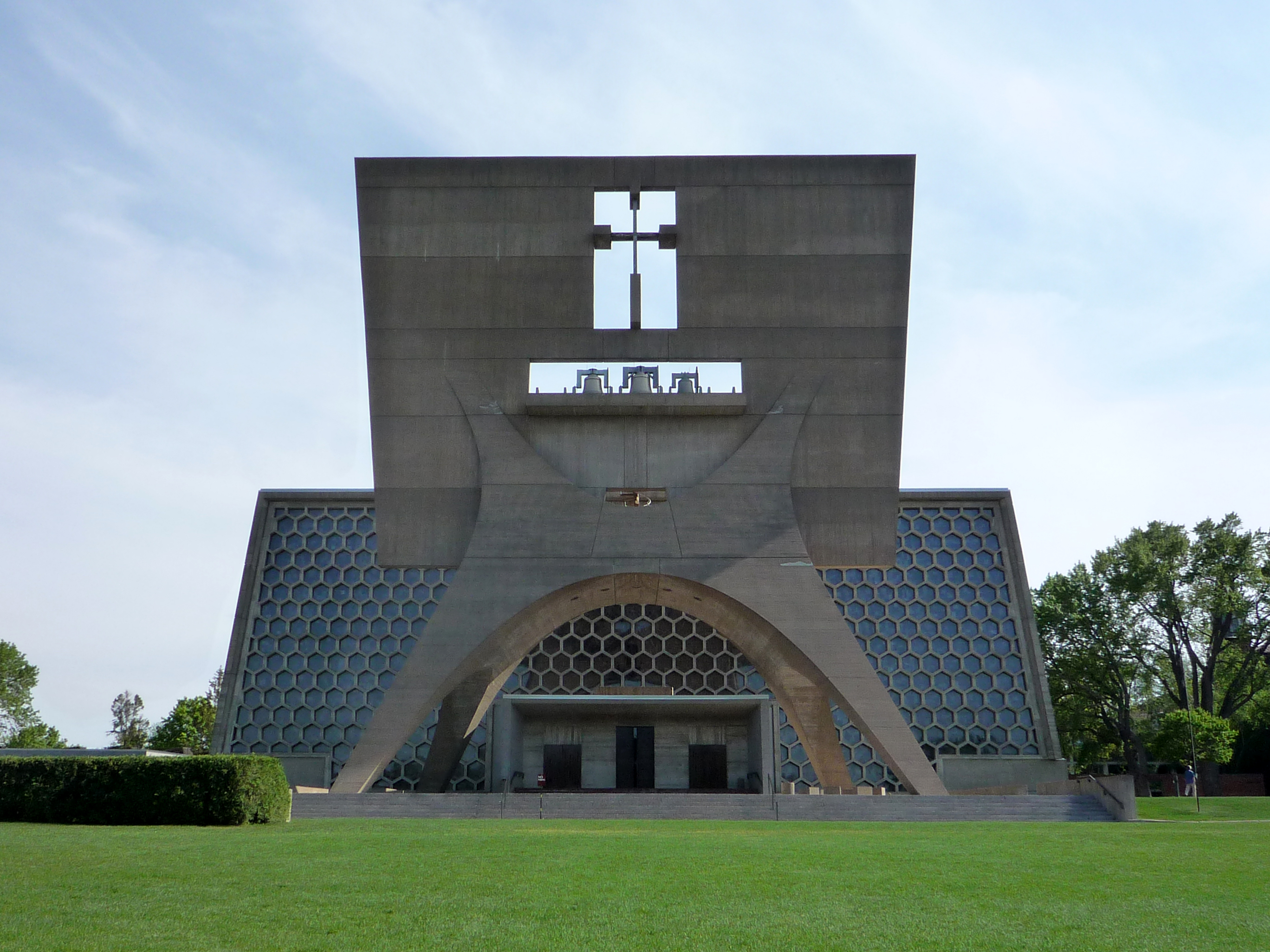
- Saint John's Abbey Church and Bell Banner, on the campus of Saint John's University

- Location within Minnesota Location within the United States

Monastery information
- Order: Order of Saint Benedict
- Established: 1856
- Mother house: Saint Vincent Archabbey, Latrobe, Pennsylvania (founded 1846)
- Archdiocese: Archdiocese of Saint Paul and Minneapolis
- Diocese: Roman Catholic Diocese of Saint Cloud
- Controlled churches: 19 total Monastic Residence points outside of the Abbey, with 16 of them being Benedictine-run parishes

People
- Founders: Fr. Bruno Riss, O.S.B., Fr. Cornelius Wittmann, O.S.B., and the founding German Benedictines.
- Abbot: Rt. Rev. Fr. Douglas Mullin, O.S.B.
- Prior: Rev. Fr. Eric Hollas, O.S.B.

Site
- Location: 2900 Abbey Plaza, Collegeville, Minnesota, United States
- Coordinates: 45°34′49″N 94°23′32″W
- Public access: Yes
- Website: www.saintjohnsabbey.org
- St. John's Abbey and University Historic District
- U.S. National Register of Historic Places
- U.S. Historic district
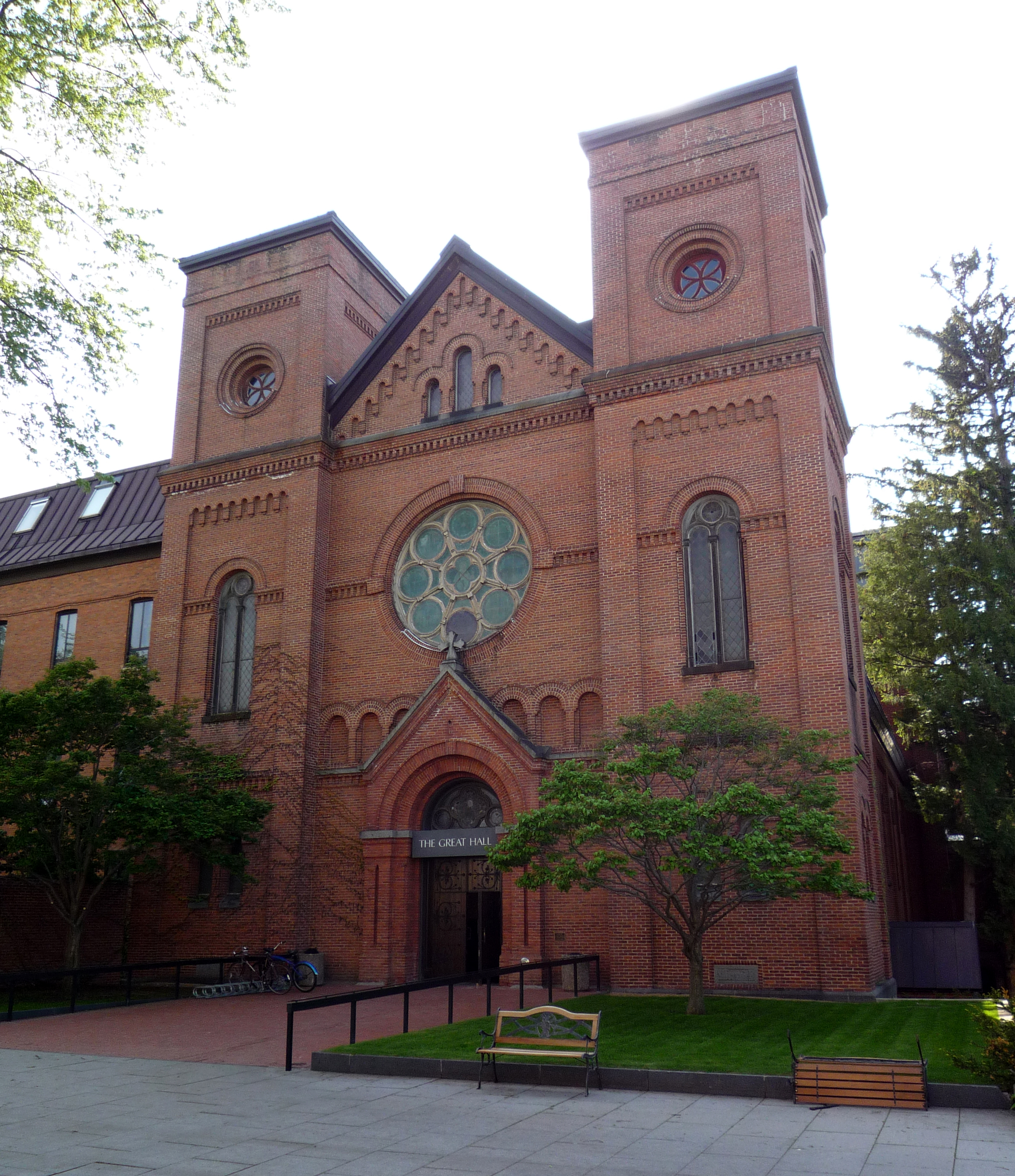
- The Great Hall, which served as the abbey church until the construction of the current church
- Area: 26 acres (11 ha)
- Built: 1868–1959
- Architect: Multiple
- Architectural style: Late Victorian, Second Empire, Romanesque Revival
- NRHP reference No.: 79001256
- Added to NRHP: March 23, 1979

Saint John's Abbey is a Benedictine monastery in Collegeville Township, Minnesota, United States, affiliated with the American-Cassinese Congregation. The abbey was established following the arrival in the area of monks from Saint Vincent Archabbey in Pennsylvania in 1856. Saint John's is one of the largest Benedictine abbeys in the Western Hemisphere, with 110 professed monks. The Right Reverend Fr. Douglas Mullin, OSB, serves as the eleventh abbot.

A school founded at the abbey grew into Saint John's University in 1883. Seventeen buildings constructed at the abbey and university between 1868 and 1959 are listed on the National Register of Historic Places as the St. John's Abbey and University Historic District.

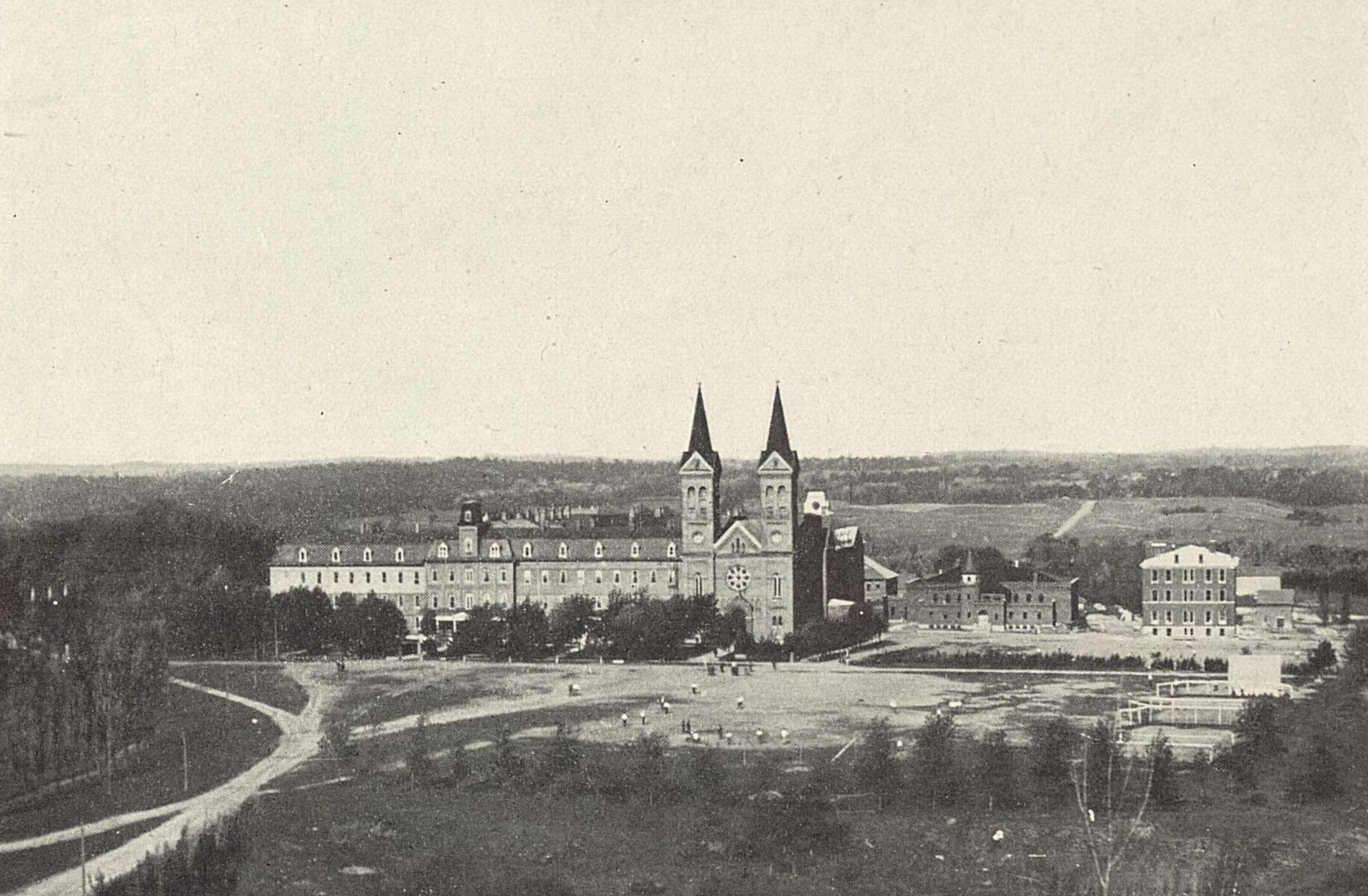
Saint John's Abbey in Collegeville, Minnesota, circa 1920, from Goldenes Jubilaeum der St. Joseph's-Gemeinde von Nord-Minneapolis.

== Establishment ==
In 1856, five monks of Saint Vincent Archabbey in Latrobe, Pennsylvania, arrived in St. Cloud, Minnesota. They established a priory there and began to minister to the German immigrants in central Minnesota. One of the first ministries of the new community was Saint John's College, which would come to be known as Saint John's Preparatory School. In 1862 the community moved some miles west, into the wooded area of the valley, and again in 1865 to the shores of Lake Sagatagan. It was in this location that the community began to flourish, and in 1866 the priory was raised to the status of Abbey and the community elected Fr. Rupert Seidenbusch as the first Abbot.

== Abbey Church of Saint John the Baptist ==
By the early 1950s the monastic community comprised about 450 monks, and had outgrown the original abbey church. Plans were made to construct a new, larger worship space which could accommodate a larger congregation. The liturgical movement which would culminate in the Second Vatican Council was in full swing at Saint John's and the new church was to be designed with some of the anticipated liturgical changes in mind. (Following the council, almost no changes needed to be made to incorporate the new liturgical rules.) The community contacted twelve architects and asked them to submit plans for a church which would "be truly an architectural monument to the service of God." In 1954 the community selected Marcel Breuer to design not only the new church but an addition to the monastic enclosure.

Breuer's design incorporated the traditional axis of baptistery, nave, and altar in a modern concrete structure. The monastic choir stalls and abbot's throne were placed in a less traditional semi-circular shape around the main altar, which also served to invite the congregation closer. The church was designed so that even with a capacity of over 2000, the entire community was able to feel like they were intimately involved in the liturgy. Perhaps the most striking part of the design was the facade and bell tower, which itself was shaped like a large bell and sat suspended over the main entrance of the church. The "bell banner" rises 112 vertical feet in front of the church and houses the 5 bells which sound the hours and call the monastic and university communities to prayer. The north facade of the building is the largest wall of stained glass in the world. It contains 430 colorful hexagons of abstract design.

Construction of the church began on May 19, 1958, and lasted until August 24, 1961. The church was consecrated in the fall of 1961 and serves as the principal liturgical space of both the monastic community and the university. The monastic community gathers for Morning Prayer, Midday Prayer, Mass, and Evening Prayer every weekday, and except for rare occasions these liturgies are open to the public. On the weekends there is no public Midday Prayer. All liturgical events in the Abbey Church are livestreamed on the Abbey website.

== Grounds ==
In addition to the preparatory school, the abbey also established Saint John's University, which was connected to the abbey by the "Quadrangle", at the time the largest building west of the Mississippi River dedicated to education.

Also located on the grounds of the abbey are the Collegeville Institute for Ecumenical and Cultural Research, the Episcopal House of Prayer (Diocese of Minnesota), the original Minnesota Public Radio studio, and the Saint John the Baptist Parish Center. The 2,500-acre (10 km^{2}) grounds of the abbey comprise lakes, prairie, and hardwoods on a rolling glacial moraine, and have been designated the Saint John's Arboretum. The abbey is the location of a number of structures designed by the modernist Bauhaus architect Marcel Breuer. The Abbey Church, with its banner bell tower, is one of his best-known works. The upper church houses the newly expanded Holtkamp Pasi organ with over 6,000 pipes. In its undercroft is a chapel that contains the relics of Saint Peregrine.

A historic district of 17 buildings at Saint John's Abbey and University was listed on the National Register of Historic Places in 1979 for having national significance in the themes of architecture, community planning and development, education, and religion. It was nominated for being an architecturally and historically significant campus of a leading religious and educational institution of the Order of Saint Benedict.

The abbey is the setting for The Cloister Walk, a collection of essays on Christian spirituality by Kathleen Norris.

The grounds include the Episcopal House of Prayer, a retreat center affiliated with the Episcopal Church.

== Publishing house ==
The abbey operates the Liturgical Press, formerly Cistercian Publications, one of the foremost liturgical publishing houses in the United States. Liturgical Press publishes book series such as Cistercian Studies.

== The Saint John's Bible ==
The Saint John's Bible is the first completely handwritten and illuminated Bible to have been commissioned by a Benedictine monastery since the invention of the printing press.

== Ministries ==
Outside of Saint John's, the abbey's monks serve 12 parishes and various nursing homes and hospitals in the Diocese of Saint Cloud.

== List of abbots ==
1. Rt. Rev. Rupert Seidenbusch, O.S.B. (1866–1875) Named Bishop of the Vicariate Apostolic of Northern Minnesota
2. Rt. Rev. Alexius Edelbrock, O.S.B. (1875–1889)
3. Rt. Rev. Bernard Locnikar, O.S.B. (1890–1894)
4. Rt. Rev. Peter Engel, O.S.B. (1894–1921)
5. Rt. Rev. Alcuin Deutsch, O.S.B. (1921–1950)
6. Rt. Rev. Baldwin Dworschak, O.S.B. (1950–1971)
7. Rt. Rev. John Eidenschink, O.S.B. (1971–1979)
8. Rt. Rev. Jerome Theisen, O.S.B. (1979–1992) Elected Abbot Primate of the Benedictine Confederation
9. Rt. Rev. Timothy Kelly, O.S.B. (1992–2000)
10. Rt. Rev. John Klassen, O.S.B. (2000–2024)
11. Rt. Rev. Douglas Mullin, O.S.B. (2024–present)

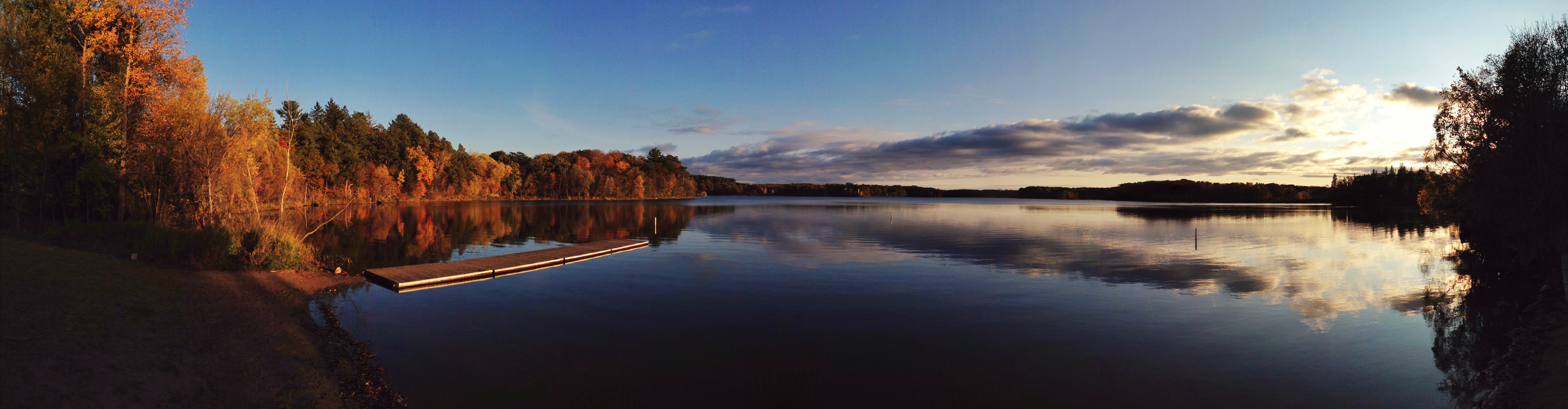
Sunset on Lake Sagatagan, 2013.

== Sexual abuse settlements ==
Saint John's Abbey has been subject of several child abuse cases with accounts reaching far back as the 1970s. In 2011, Saint John's Abbey released the names of 18 current or former monks who "have had credible allegations of sexual abuse, exploitation, or misconduct brought against them while they were working in one of the apostolates of St. John's Abbey, or before they were a member of the abbey." On December 10, 2013, the Abbey described 23 current and former monks who “likely have offended against minors" and released the names of 18 of them; this list of names was distinct from the 2011 list of 18 monks. Of the 18 in the 2013 list, seven were dead and two were no longer practicing monks.

(Michael) Bik was accused in 1997 of abusing two teenage boys in the 1970s, before his ordination, when he taught at the parish school of St. Stephen Catholic Church in Anoka.

Two men accused (Richard) Eckroth in 1993 of raping them at a St. John’s-owned cabin near Bemidji in the 1970s when they were boys. He denied raping them but admitted being naked with them.

Three men filed lawsuits alleging abuse by (Francisco) Schulte when he served in Raleigh, N.C., in the mid-1980s, and at a Puerto Rico boarding school operated by St. John’s. One of the men from Raleigh said Schulte recruited him to come to St. John’s Preparatory School in Collegeville.

(Finian) McDonald, (Brennan) Maiers, (Dunstan) Moorse, (Allen) Tarlton, (Francis) Hoefgen and (John) Kelly acknowledged wrongdoing and sought treatment, Klassen said in 2002.

(Cosmas) Dahlheimer denied the allegations, Klassen said.

On April 25, 2015, the Abbey settled a Stearns County sex abuse suit for an undisclosed amount. The victim claimed that Rev. Allen Tarlton sexually abused him in 1977 at St. John's Preparatory School in Collegeville. The victim's lawyer stated that one of the settlement conditions was for the Abbery to release documents on 19 monks accused of child abuse. Among those released documents Tarlton admitted to molesting a high school student in a 14-page undated memoir.

== See also ==
- Justus Trettel
- National Register of Historic Places listings in Stearns County, Minnesota
