= Diocese of Saint Cloud =

Latin Catholic ecclesiastical jurisdiction in Minnesota, USA

Coordinates: 45°33′N 94°10′W

Diocese of Saint Cloud Dioecesis Sancti Clodoaldi
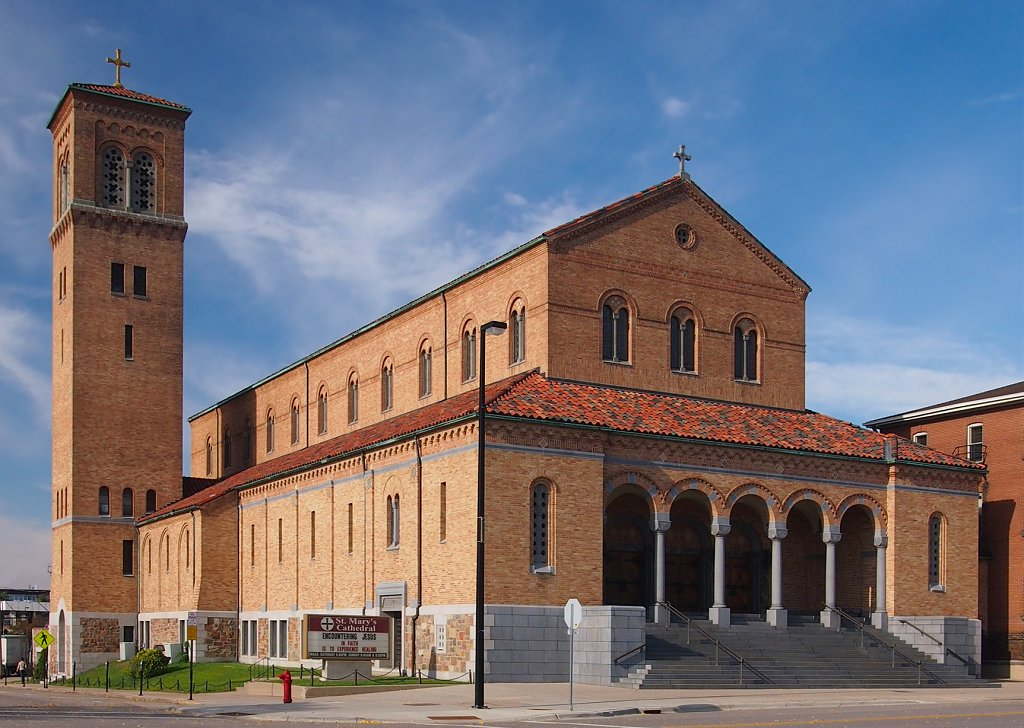
- Cathedral of St Mary

- Coat of arms

Location
- Country: United States
- Territory: 16 counties in central Minnesota
- Ecclesiastical province: Saint Paul and Minneapolis

Statistics
- Area: 12,251 sq mi (31,730 km^{2})
- Population: Total; Catholics: (as of 2010); 558,890; 142,576 (25.5%)
- Parishes: 135

Information
- Denomination: Catholic
- Sui iuris church: Latin Church
- Rite: Roman Rite
- Established: September 22, 1889 (137 years ago)
- Cathedral: Cathedral of St. Mary
- Patron saint: Clodoald

Current leadership
- Pope: Leo XIV
- Bishop: Patrick Neary
- Metropolitan Archbishop: Bernard Hebda
- Bishops emeritus: Donald Joseph Kettler

Map

Website
- stclouddiocese.org

The Diocese of Saint Cloud (Latin: Dioecesis Sancti Clodoaldi) is a diocese of the Catholic Church in central Minnesota in the United States. It is a suffragan diocese of the metropolitan Archdiocese of Saint Paul and Minneapolis. Its mother church is the Cathedral of St. Mary in St. Cloud. The diocese's patron saint is St. Clodoald. Patrick Neary has been the bishop since 2023.

== Territory ==
The Diocese of Saint Cloud covers Benton, Douglas, Grant, Isanti, Kanabec, Mille Lacs, Morrison, Otter Tail, Pope, Sherburne, Stearns, Stevens, Todd, Traverse, Wadena, and Wilkin counties.

== History ==
=== 1800 to 1870 ===
Central Minnesota went through several Catholic jurisdictions before the Vatican erected the Diocese of Saint Cloud:

- Diocese of Saint Louis (1826 to 1837)
- Diocese of Dubuque (1837 to 1850)
- Diocese of Saint Paul (1850 to 1875)
- Vicariate Apostolic of Northern Minnesota (1875 to 1889)

The first mass in the St. Cloud area was offered by Francis de Vivaldi, a missionary to the Winnebago reservation in Long Prairie in 1851. The mass took place inside a log cabin owned by James Keough. Keough later recalled,

The congregation present was made up of Irish and French Canadians. The altar was prepared by a half-breed (sic) lady, the wife of a Canadian Frenchman. I am the owner of the table used as an altar on that occasion. Some time after this Father Pierz came among us, and subsequently built the first Catholic church at Sauk Rapids.

In 1852, Bishop Joseph Crétin of Saint Paul sent the missionary priest Francis Xavier Pierz to the Ojibwe Nation (Chippewa). Pierz was put in charge of an apostolate in central and northern Minnesota with a large Native American congregation. To attract more European Catholics to the area, he wrote articles in German newspapers about the availability of good agricultural land in Minnesota. By 1855, many German, Slovene, and Luxembourger settlers started arriving in the region. In 1856, five monks of Saint Vincent Archabbey in Latrobe, Pennsylvania, arrived in St. Cloud to minister to the German settlers. They established Saint John's college in 1857 in Collegeville.

=== 1870 to 1900 ===
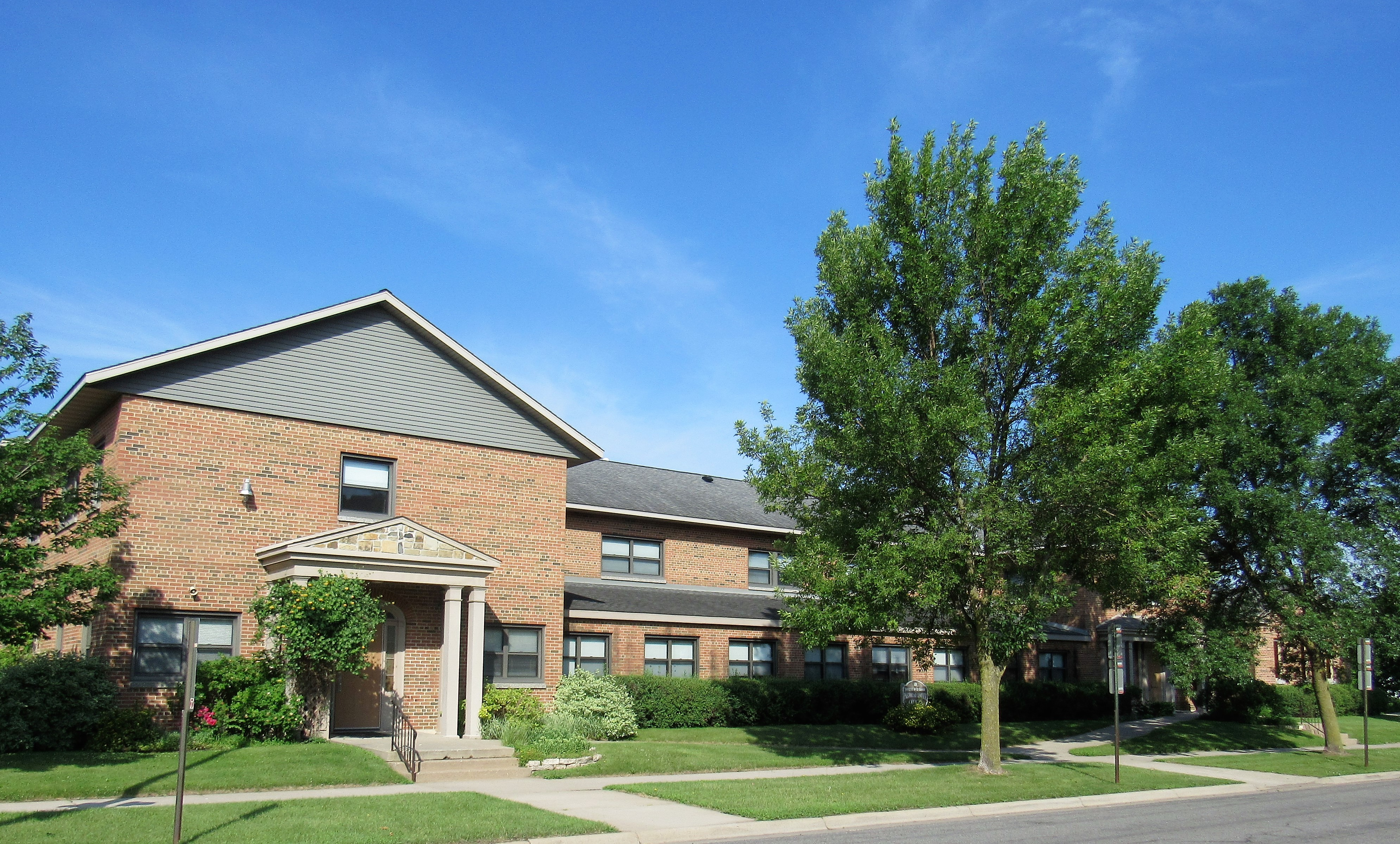
Diocesan Pastoral Center, St. Cloud, Minnesota (2019)

On February 12, 1875, Pope Pius IX established the Vicariate Apostolic of Northern Minnesota. The pope named Abbot Rupert Seidenbusch, leader of the Abbey of St. Louis on the Lake, as the vicar apostolic.His jurisdiction covered all of present-day Minnesota, North Dakota, and South Dakota.

After his consecration, Seidenbusch traveled across the vicariate by buggy, wagon, and rail and continued to solicit donations from Europe. He used Saint Mary's Church in St. Cloud as his temporary cathedral, administering confirmation for the first time there in 1875. He performed his first ordinations of seminarians at Saint John's College in 1876. Seidenbusch oversaw the completion of Holy Angels Cathedral in 1884. During his term, the Vatican removed the Dakotas and erected the Diocese of Duluth from the vicariate. Seidenbusch retired due to poor health in 1888.

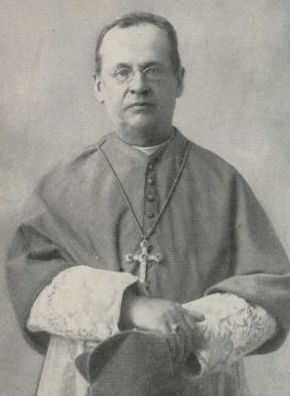
Bishop Trobec (1921)

On September 22, 1888, Pope Leo XIII suppressed the Vicariate Apostolic of Northern Minnesota. to erect the Diocese of Saint Cloud. John Zardetti, general vicar of the Vicariate of Dakota, became the first bishop of Saint Cloud. Zardetti immediately started construction of Holy Angels Cathedral in St. Cloud. He worked to enlarge the parochial school system and publish a newspaper for the diocese.

The Sisters of the Order of St. Benedict in 1886 opened St. Benedict Hospital in St. Cloud. In 1889, the Benedictine brothers opened St. Benedict's Academy in St. Cloud. which became St. Benedict's College in 1913.

=== 1900 to 1950 ===
The Sisters of St. Benedict in 1900 replaced St. Benedict Hospital with the larger St. Raphael Hospital.Suffering from the cold climate, the Vatican allowed Zardetti in 1894 to resign as bishop and return to Rome to serve in the Roman Curia.

Leo XIII named Bishop Martin Marty of the Diocese of Sioux Falls as the second bishop of Saint Cloud in 1895. Already ill when he took office, Marty died less than two years later in 1896. Leo XIII appointed James Trobec of St. Paul in 1897 to replace Marty.

Trobec led the diocese through a time of growth, with a particular focus on priestly vocations and Catholic education. By 1911, the Catholic population of the diocese had grown by 25,000, the number of priests and parishes had each increased by 35, and the diocese had two new hospitals.

After Trobec retired in 1914, Bishop Joseph Francis Busch of the Diocese of Lead became Saint Cloud's next bishop.St. Raphael Hospital was replaced in 1928 by St. Cloud Hospital. It is today CentraCare - St. Cloud Hospital. In 1937, St. Mary's Church in St. Cloud was designated as the Cathedral of Saint Mary, replacing Holy Angels Cathedral. In 1941, Peter William Bartholome was named coadjutor bishop to assist Busch.

=== 1950 to present ===
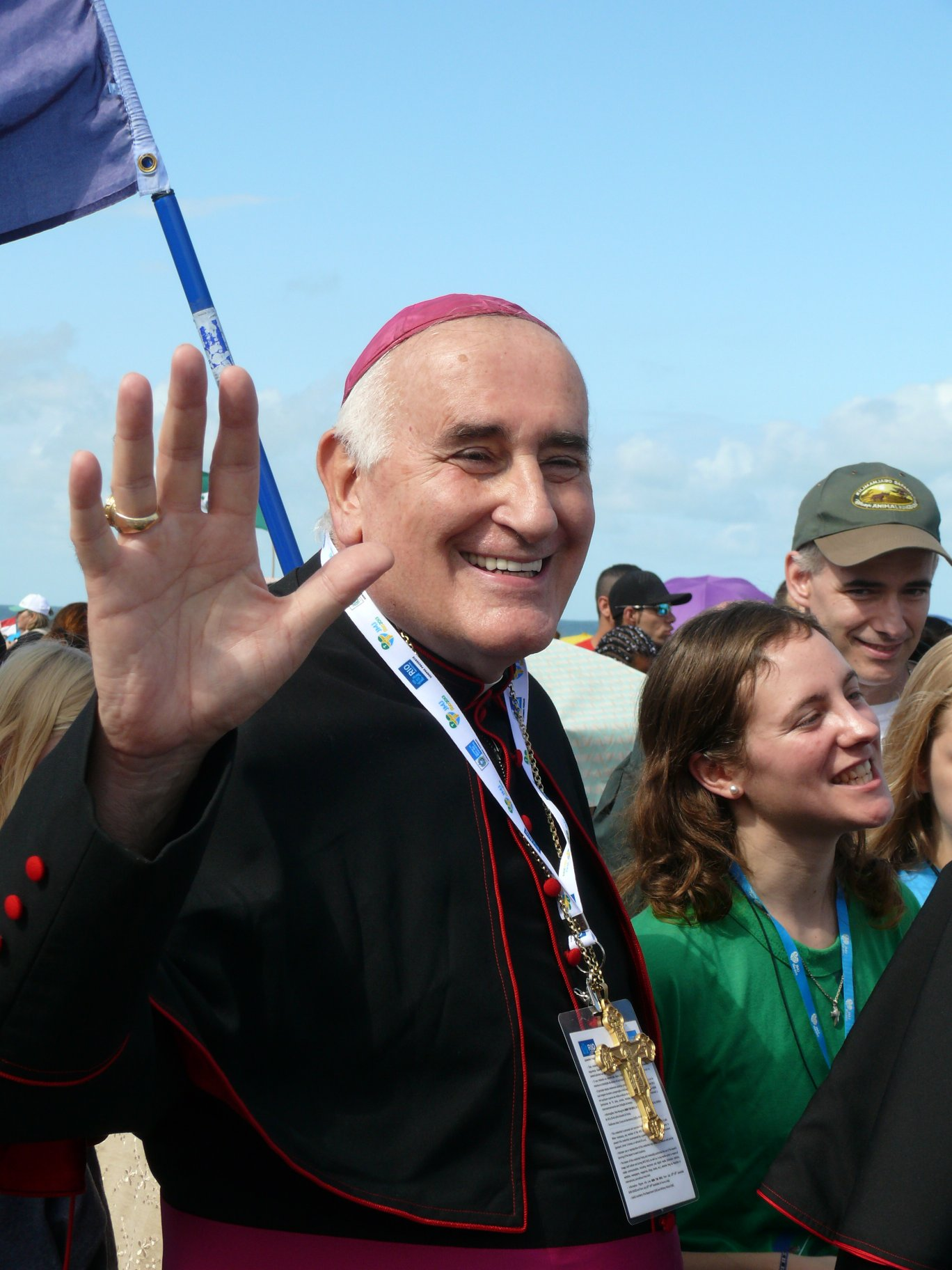
Bishop Kettler (2013)

After 38 years as bishop, Busch died in 1953. Bartholome succeeded him as bishop of Saint Cloud. In 1966, Auxiliary Bishop George Henry Speltz from the Diocese of Winona was appointed coadjutor bishop. When Bartholome retired in 1971, Speltz took his place. In 1984, Speltz refused to allow Catholic weddings for couples who cohabitated before marriage. Speltz retired in 1987 due to poor health.

Abbot Jerome Hanus of Conception Abbey in Conception, Missouri took office as the next bishop of Saint Cloud in 1987. In 1994, Hanus became the coadjutor archbishop of the Archdiocese of Dubuque. In 1995, Bishop John Francis Kinney of the Diocese of Bismarck replaced Hanus in Saint Cloud. Kinney retired in 2013.

Pope Francis named Bishop Donald Joseph Kettler of the Diocese of Fairbanks as bishop of Saint Cloud in 2013. He retired in 2022.Francis in 2023 named Patrick Neary of the Congregation of Holy Cross as the next bishop of St. Cloud.

Neary in 2026 announced the merger of the 131 parishes in the diocese into 48 parish groups. The reasons for the restructuring were the shortage of priests, the drop in parish enrollments and the financial distress of many parishes.

=== 2000 to 2020 ===
In 2007, police received a complaint from an 18-year-old man who had been receiving anonymous obscene and suggestive letters. The letters were traced to John Lloyd Caskey, a priest in Morris. When police searched Caskey's residence, they discovered 8,600 images of child pornography on his personal computer. He was arrested shortly thereafter and suspended from ministry by Bishop Kinney. Caskey pleaded guilty and was sentenced in May 2009 to one month in jail and five years' probation.

In 2013, the Minnesota Legislature passed the Minnesota Child Victims Act of 2013, lifting the previous civil statute of limitations for child abuse sexual allegations until 2016, and allowing individuals to file lawsuits on old sexual abuse claims. In 2015, two women sued the diocese, claiming that they had been sexually abused by Donald Rieder, a priest from Randall, when they were ages 11 to 15 in the 1960s. Rieder was convicted in 2003 of sexual abuse of a minor and spent one year in prison.

In 2016, the diocese turned over 13,500 documents related to sexual abuse allegations against its priests to law enforcement. In August 2018, the diocese announced its cooperation with a proposed grand jury investigation to disclose names of accused priests.The diocese in June 2020 filed for Chapter 11 bankruptcy.The Catholic Charities affiliate in St. Cloud sued the diocese in 2018. Four years earlier, the diocese had committed to transferring ownership of the St. Cloud Children’s Home to Catholic Charities. Based on that agreement, the charity had spent a large amount of money updating the facility. The point of the lawsuit was to ensure that the ownership was indeed transferred. In December 2020, the bankruptcy court approved a bankruptcy plan for the diocese.

=== 2020 to present ===
In May 2020, the diocese reached a $22.5 million settlement plan for 70 sexual abuse survivors. The same day, Bishop Kettler apologized to the victims for the harm they suffered. He said that he remained committed to "assist in the healing of all those who have been hurt." In 2022, the diocese published an updated list of diocesan clergy with credible accusations of sexual abuse of minors.

== Coat of arms ==
Coat of arms of Diocese of Saint Cloud
Escutcheon France ancient, thereon a chalice argent, the bowl charged with a cross-ancrée sable Symbolism The arms of the diocese are based on the retroactive arms of Clovis and Clodomir, with a chalice added indicating St. Clodoaldus's priesthood.

== Bishops ==
=== Vicar Apostolic of Northern Minnesota ===
- Rupert Seidenbusch (1875–1888)

=== Bishops of Saint Cloud ===
- John Joseph Frederick Otto Zardetti (1889–1894), appointed Archbishop of Bucharest
- Martin Marty (1895–1896)
- James Trobec (1897–1914)
- Joseph Francis Busch (1915–1953)
- Peter William Bartholome (1953–1968)
- George Henry Speltz (1968–1987)
- Jerome George Hanus (1987–1994), appointed Coadjutor Archbishop and later Archbishop of Dubuque
- John Francis Kinney (1995–2013)
- Donald Joseph Kettler (2013 – 2022)
- Patrick Neary (2023–present)

=== Coadjutor bishops ===
- Peter William Bartholome (1941–1953)
- George Henry Speltz (1966–1968)

=== Auxiliary bishop ===
- James Steven Rausch (1973–1977), appointed Bishop of Phoenix

=== Other diocesan priests who became bishops ===
- Henry Joseph Soenneker, Bishop of Owensboro (1961–1982)
- Harold Joseph Dimmerling, Bishop of Rapid City (1969–1987)

== Education ==
The Diocese of Saint Cloud has two institutions of higher learning, a school of theology, 27 elementary schools, and two high schools.

=== Higher education ===
- College of St. Benedict in St. Joseph (for women)
- Saint John’s School of Theology and Seminary in Collegeville (the school of theology is coed)
- Saint John’s University in Collegeville (for men)

=== High schools ===
- Cathedral High School – St. Cloud
- Saint John's Preparatory School – Collegeville
