= Joseph Francis Busch =

Catholic bishop

His Excellency, The Most Reverend Joseph Francis Busch
- Bishop of St. Cloud
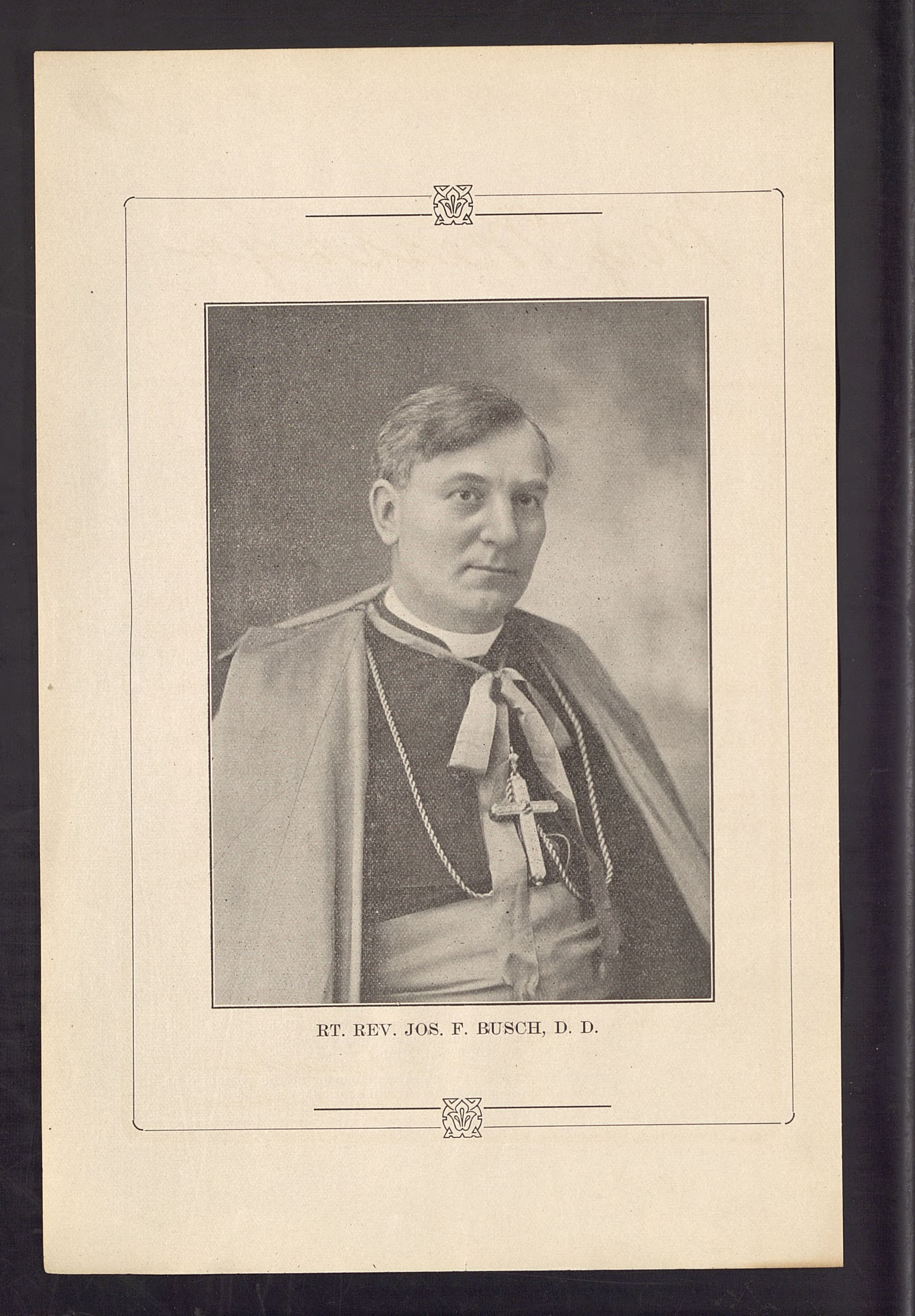
- Rt. Rev. Joseph F. Busch, D.D., from My Message, Official Organ of the Diocese of St. Cloud (St. Cloud, Minnesota), Volume 1, Number 1.
- Church: Roman Catholic Church
- Diocese: St. Cloud
- See: Diocese of St. Cloud
- Predecessor: James Trobec
- Successor: John Jeremiah Lawler
- Other post: Bishop of Lead

Orders
- Ordination: July 28, 1889 by Johann Nepomucenus Zobl
- Consecration: May 19, 1910 by John Ireland

Personal details
- Born: April 18, 1866 Red Wing, Minnesota, US
- Died: May 31, 1953 (aged 87) St. Cloud, Minnesota, US
- Education: Canisius College; University of Innsbruck; Catholic University of America
- Motto: Dominus his opus habel (The Lord has need of these things)
- Coat of arms

Joseph Francis Busch (April 18, 1866—May 31, 1953) was an American prelate of the Catholic Church. He served as bishop of the Diocese of Lead in South Dakota from 1910 to 1915 and bishop of the Diocese of Saint Cloud in Minnesota from 1915 until his death in 1953.

== Biography ==
=== Early life ===
Joseph Busch was born on April 18, 1866, in Red Wing, Minnesota, the eldest of twelve children of Frederick and Anna M. (née Weimar) Busch. His parents were German immigrants; his father served for many years as president of the Goodhue County National Bank in Red Wing and was also president of the La Grange mills.

Joseph Busch received his early education at the public and parochial schools of Red Wing, and afterwards attended parochial schools in Mankato. He then attended Canisius College in Buffalo, New York, before entering Campion College in Prairie du Chien, Wisconsin, where he completed his classical studies. Busch studied philosophy and theology at the University of Innsbruck in Austria.

=== Priesthood ===
Busch was ordained to the priesthood in Innsbruck for the Archdiocese of Saint Paul on July 28, 1889, by Bishop Johann Nepomucenus Zobl. He furthered his studies at the Catholic University of America in Washington, D.C., for one year. Busch then returned to Minnesota and served as secretary of Archbishop John Ireland for two years. He also served as a curate at St. Mary's Parish and St. Paul's Cathedral Parish, both in St. Paul. He founded St. Augustine's Parish of St. Paul in 1896, serving as its first pastor. Busch later served at St. Lawrence Parish in Minneapolis and St. Anne Parish in Le Sueur, Minnesota. In 1902, he established the diocesan missionary band of the archdiocese, serving as its director until 1910.

=== Bishop of Lead ===
Coat of arms as bishop of Lead.

On April 9, 1910, Busch was appointed the second bishop of Lead by Pope Pius X. He received his episcopal consecration at Saint Paul Seminary in St. Paul, Minnesota, on May 19, 1910, from Archbishop Ireland, with Bishops James McGolrick and James Trobec serving as co-consecrators. During his tenure, Busch called for the abolition of work on Sundays. He subsequently received so much criticism that he was forced to relocate from Lead to Rapid City.

=== Bishop of Saint Cloud ===
On January 19, 1915, Busch was appointed the fourth Bishop of Saint Cloud in Minnesota by Pope Benedict XV. In 1917, he became the first chairman of the Stearns County chapter of the American Red Cross. He was named an assistant at the pontifical throne in 1923.

Joseph Busch died in St. Cloud on May 31, 1953, at age 87.

== Notes ==
Catholic Church titles
| Preceded by John Stariha | Bishop of Lead; 1910–1915 | Succeeded by John Jeremiah Lawler |
| Preceded by James Trobec | Bishop of St. Cloud; 1915–1953 | Succeeded by Peter William Bartholome |
