= James Richard Ham =

American Roman Catholic bishop

James Richard Ham (July 11, 1921 – December 20, 2002) was a Roman Catholic Titular Bishop of Putia in Numidia and Auxiliary Bishop of Saint Paul and Minneapolis in Minnesota.

Born in Chicago, Illinois, Ham was ordered a priest for the Maryknoll order on June 12, 1948. On November 28, 1967, he was appointed auxiliary bishop and served as a missionary in Guatemala from 1968 until 1979. From October 7, 1980, until his retirement on October 30, 1990, Bishop Ham served as auxiliary bishop of the Saint Paul and Minneapolis Archdiocese.
