= Lambert Anthony Hoch =

American prelate of the Roman Catholic Church

His Excellency, The Most Reverend Lambert Anthony Hoch
- Bishop of Sioux Falls
- See: Diocese of Sioux Falls
- In office: December 5, 1956 to June 13, 1978
- Predecessor: William O. Brady
- Successor: Paul Vincent Dudley
- Previous post: Bishop of Bismarck1952 to 1956

Orders
- Ordination: May 30, 1928 by Bernard Joseph Mahoney
- Consecration: March 25, 1952 by Amleto Giovanni Cicognani

Personal details
- Born: Lambert Anthony Hoch; June 2, 1903 Elkton, South Dakota, US
- Died: June 27, 1990 (aged 87)
- Education: Creighton University; Saint Paul Seminary School of Divinity
- Motto: Adjuva me domine (Help me, Lord)

Lambert Anthony Hoch (February 6, 1903 – June 27, 1990) was an American prelate of the Roman Catholic Church. He served as bishop of Bismarck in North Dakota (1952–1956) and bishop of Sioux Falls in South Dakota (1956–1978).

== Biography ==
=== Early life ===
Lambert Hoch was born on February 6, 1903, in Elkton, South Dakota, to George and Philomena (née Kniest) Hoch, the youngest of their nine children. After graduating from Elkton High School, he entered Creighton University in Omaha, Nebraska in 1920. He earned a Bachelor of Arts degree from Creighton in 1924, and then studied theology at St. Paul Seminary in St. Paul, Minnesota.

=== Priesthood ===
Hoch was ordained to the priesthood for the Diocese of Sioux Falls by Bishop Bernard Mahoney on May 30, 1928 in Sioux Falls, South Dakota.

After his ordination, the diocese assigned Hoch as a professor of philosophy at Columbus College in Sioux Falls. In 1929, he was sent to serve as curate at Immaculate Conception Parish in Watertown, South Dakota. In 1933, Hoch was named chancellor of the diocese. In addition to his duties as chancellor, he served as chaplain of McKennan Hospital in Sioux Falls for 11 years. The Vatican elevated Hoch to the rank of domestic prelate in 1943.

=== Bishop of Bismarck ===
On January 23, 1952, Hoch was appointed the third bishop of Bismarck by Pope Pius XII. He received his episcopal consecration at the Cathedral of Saint Joseph in Sioux Falls on March 25, 1952, from Archbishop Amleto Cicognani, with Bishops William O. Brady and Francis Schenk serving as co-consecrators. He was the first native South Dakotan to become a Catholic bishop.

Hoch was installed by Archbishop John Murray at the Cathedral of the Holy Spirit in Bismarck on April 2, 1952. During his four-year-long tenure, Hoch worked to promote vocations to the priesthood and religious life; between 1952 and 1960, 29 priests were ordained for the diocese and 13 for Assumption Abbey in Richardton, North Dakota.

=== Bishop of Sioux Falls ===
Hoch was named the fifth bishop of Sioux Falls on November 27, 1956, by Pius XII. He was installed on December 5, 1956. He attended all four sessions of the Second Vatican Council in Rome between 1962 and 1965, and dedicated much of his administration to implementing the council's reforms. Hoch fostered ecumenical relations with other faiths and helped establish the South Dakota Association of Christian Churches. In 1963, he baptized and confirmed the Fischer quintuplets, who were the first known surviving set of American quintuplets.

=== Retirement and legacy ===
After reaching the mandatory retirement age of 75, Hoch resigned as bishop on June 13, 1978. Lambert Hoch died after a long illness at McKennan Hospital in Sioux Falls on June 27, 1990, at age 87.

In 2003, it was revealed that Hoch sent Reverend Bruce McArthur, a Diocese of Sioux Falls priest, to treatment twice after accusations of sexually molesting children in 1963 and 1965. Hoch did not report McArthur to police or to the parishioners. In 1978, McArthur was sentenced to 23 months in Texas state prison for sexually assaulting a woman in a nursing home.

== Episcopal succession ==
Catholic Church titles
Preceded by Vincent James Ryan	Bishop of Bismarck; 1952–1956	Succeeded by Hilary Baumann Hacker
Preceded by William O. Brady	Bishop of Sioux Falls; 1956–1978	Succeeded by Paul Vincent Dudley
