= Diocese of Sioux Falls =

Diocese of the Catholic Church

Coordinates: 43°32′11″N 96°43′54″W

Diocese of Sioux Falls Dioecesis Siouxormensis
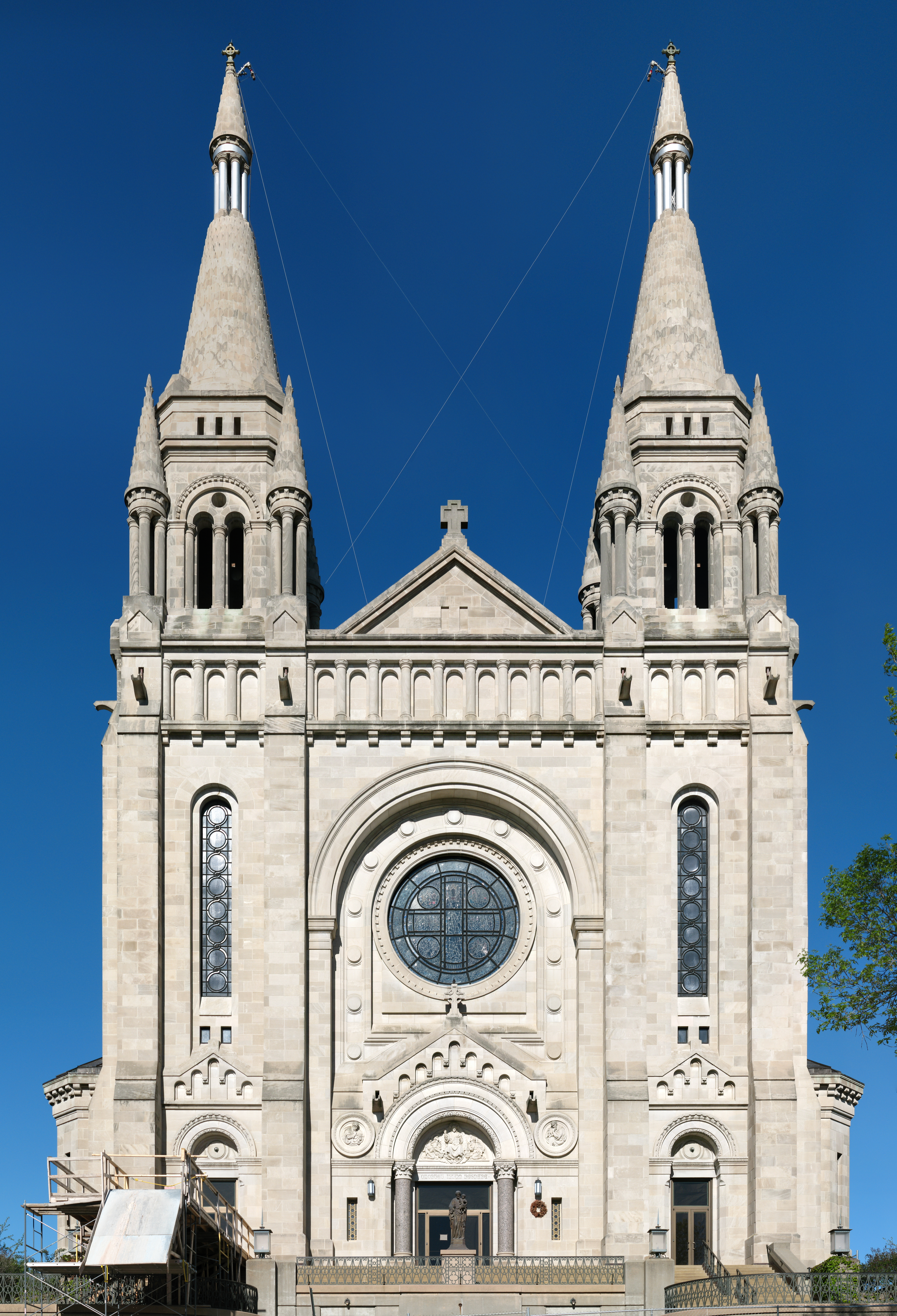
- St. Joseph Cathedral

- Coat of arms

Location
- Country: United States
- Territory: East of the Missouri River in South Dakota
- Ecclesiastical province: Saint Paul and Minneapolis

Statistics
- Area: 90,885 km^{2} (35,091 sq mi)
- Population: Total; Catholics: (as of 2010); 550,000; 135,600 (24.7%)
- Parishes: 150

Information
- Denomination: Catholic
- Sui iuris church: Latin Church
- Rite: Roman Rite
- Established: November 12, 1889 (136 years ago)
- Cathedral: St. Joseph Cathedral
- Patron saint: Saint Joseph

Current leadership
- Pope: Leo XIV
- Bishop: Donald DeGrood
- Metropolitan Archbishop: Bernard Hebda

Map
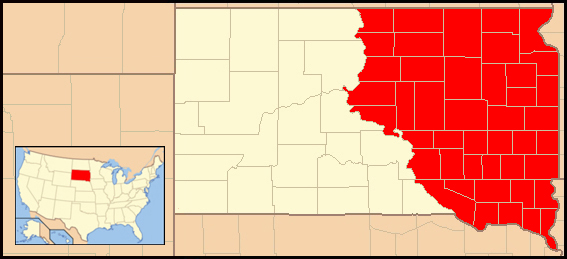

Website
- sfcatholic.org

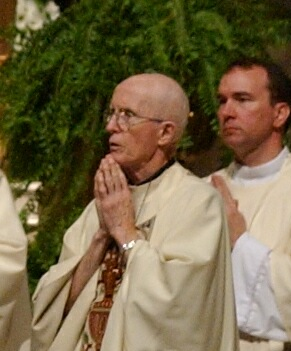
Bishop Dudley (2004)

The Diocese of Sioux Falls (Latin: Dioecesis Siouxormensis) is a Latin Church diocese of the Catholic Church diocese in South Dakota in the United States. It is a suffragan see of the metropolitan Archdiocese of Saint Paul and Minneapolis.

The Diocese of Sioux Falls covers South Dakota east of the Missouri River. The mother church is St. Joseph Cathedral in Sioux Falls. Since 2020, the Diocese has been led by bishop Donald DeGrood.

== History ==
=== 1800 to 1889 ===
Eastern South Dakota went through several Catholic jurisdictions before the Vatican erected the Diocese of Sioux Falls:

- Diocese of Saint Louis (1826 to 1837)
- Diocese of Dubuque (1837 to 1850)
- Diocese of Saint Paul (1850 to 1879)
- Vicariate Apostolic of Dakota (1879 to 1889)

The Catholic presence in present-day South Dakota began in 1842 when the French missionary Reverend Augustin Ravoux from the Diocese of Saint Paul traveled up the Missouri River to baptize children at Fort Pierre. He returned to Vermilion in 1845 to minister to Catholic families there. The first Catholic church in the Dakotas, St. Peter's was dedicated in Jefferson in 1867 to serve a French Catholic population.

On August 12, 1879 Pope Leo XIII established the Vicariate Apostolic of Dakota, with territory taken from the Diocese of Saint Paul. The pope appointed Martin Marty, the abbot of Saint Meinrad Seminary in St. Meinrad, Indiana, as the apostolic vicar of this territory. Marty worked among the Lakota/Sioux people living on the Standing Rock Reservation in the Dakota Territory. The Hunkpapa Lakota called him "Black Robe Lean Chief".

As the Dakota Territory had only 12 Catholic priests, Marty actively recruited priests from the Eastern United States and Europe. In 1880, Marty persuaded Benedictine sisters from Missouri to assist him in ministering at Fort Yates, a center of the Yankton Lakota people The first Catholic church in Sioux Falls, St. Michael's, was dedicated in 1881. It later became the first cathedral of the Diocese of Sioux Falls.

=== 1889 to 1922 ===
In 1889, Leo XIII suppressed the vicariate and erected the Diocese of Sioux Falls, which included all of the new State of South Dakota. Marty was transitioned from apostolic vicar into the first bishop of the new diocese. In 1895, Marty became bishop of the Diocese of St. Cloud.

The second bishop of Sioux Falls was Reverend Thomas O'Gorman, named by Leo XIII in 1896. During his 25-year tenure, O'Gorman increased the number of priests in the diocese, and erected numerous churches, schools, and hospitals. In 1902, the Vatican erected the Diocese of Lead, incorporating all of South Dakota west of the Missouri River. The Benedictine Sisters Order opened the Sacred Heart School of Nursing in Yankton in 1905, later to become Mount Marty University.

O'Gorman dedicated St. Joseph's Cathedral in Sioux Falls in 1919, and founded Columbus College in Chamberlain in 1921. The architect for the St. Joseph Cathedral was Emmanuel Louis Masqueray. The St. Joseph Mission school was founded on the Yankton Sioux Reservation in 1924. After 25 years as bishop, O'Gorman died in 1921.

=== 1922 to 1978 ===
In 1922, Monsignor Bernard Mahoney, spiritual director of the Pontifical North American College in Rome, was appointed bishop of Sioux Falls by Pope Pius XI. Mahoney's 17 years as bishop were marked by poor economic conditions and a heavy diocesan debt. While the number of priests in the diocese increased from 156 to 174 under his tenure, the total Catholic population fell from 71,000 to 60,000. He was forced to close Columbus College due to financial difficulties in 1929. Mahoney established Cathedral High School in Sioux Falls in 1926.

After Mahoney died in 1939, Pope Pius XII named William O. Brady of St. Paul that same year to serve as the next bishop of Sioux Falls. In 1951, Presentation College for women opened in Aberdeen. In 1956, Brady became the coadjutor archbishop for the Archdiocese of St. Paul. The pope then appointed Bishop Lambert Hoch of the Diocese of Bismarck in 1956 to take over in Sioux Falls. After attending the Second Vatican Council in Rome between 1962 and 1965, Hoch dedicated much of his administration to implementing the council's reforms. Hoch fostered ecumenical relations with other faiths and helped establish the South Dakota Association of Christian Churches. In 1963, Hoch baptized and confirmed the Fischer quintuplets, the first known surviving set of American quintuplets. Hoch retired in 1978.

=== 1978 to present ===
The next bishop of Sioux Falls was Auxiliary Bishop Paul Dudley of the Archdiocese of Saint Paul and Minneapolis, appointed by Pope John Paul II in 1978. During his tenure, Dudley developed several ecumenical ministries serving the poor, and fostered many retreat and spiritual renewal programs. He was active in such anti-abortion organizations as Minnesota Citizens Concerned for Life, Total Life Care, and Prolife Across America.

In 1994, John Paul II named Auxiliary Bishop Robert Carlson of Saint Paul and Minneapolis as coadjutor bishop of Sioux Falls to assist Dudley. After sixteen years as bishop, Dudley retired in 1995 and Carlson automatically succeeded him as bishop of Sioux Falls. Carlson was selected in 2004 as bishop of the Diocese of Saginaw. To replace Carlson, Pope Benedict XVI appointed Monsignor Paul J. Swain of the Diocese of Madison. Swain retired in 2019. As of 2023, the current bishop of the Diocese of Sioux Falls is Donald DeGrood from Saint Paul and Minneapolis. He was selected by Pope Francis in 2019.

=== Sex abuse ===
==== 1978 to 2000 ====
In 1978, Rev. Bruce MacArthur, originally from the Diocese of Sioux City, was convicted in Texas of trying to rape a disabled woman in a nursing home. The diocese had previously received reports of him abusing children in the 1960s, but took no action. After MacArthur spent five years in prison, the diocese in 1981 allowed him to return to ministry in South Dakota. In 1992, a woman from the diocese accused MacArthur of abusing her 30 years ago as a minor. MacArthur was laicized by the Vatican that same year.

The diocese was sued in 1995 by Kurt Brick, who claimed that he was sexually abused, starting at age 14, by Rev. William Neuroth at Bishop O'Gorman High School. When Brick reported the abuse to Bishop Hoch in the late 1970s, Hoch said that he would stop Neuroth from approaching Brick, but Neuroth continued to stalk him. Brick settled his lawsuit with the diocese in 1999. Three other boys later accused Neuroth of sexual abuse; he was laicized by the Vatican in 1995.

==== 2000 to present ====
A Florida woman, Judith Glassman DeLonga, sued the diocese, along with Bishops Carlson and Dudley, in 2003. She claimed that MacArthur had sexually abused her between 1965 and 1970 when she was a child in Beaver Dam, Wisconsin. By this time, MacArthur had admitted to abusing 30 children.

In 2003, Native Americans alumni of several Catholic boarding and mission schools in North and South Dakota started filing lawsuits against the Dioceses of Sioux Falls and Rapid City and several religious orders. The plaintiffs claimed that they had been physically and sexually abused by clergy, nuns and other staff at these institutions. The institutions named in the lawsuits included:

- St. Paul's Indian Mission School on the Yankton Sioux Reservation near Wagner
- St. Joseph's Indian School in Chamberlain
- Tekakwitha Indian Mission School and its associated orphanage on the Lake Traverse Indian Reservation in Sisseton

By 2010, over 100 plaintiffs had joined sexual abuse lawsuits against the diocese. In response, diocese officials claimed that they were not responsible for what happened at the schools as they were run independently by the religious orders. A judge in March 2010 dismissed 18 of the Native American lawsuits. Under a 2010 South Dakota law, a sexual abuse victim could only initiate a lawsuit up to age 40.

Bishop Carlson invited the South Dakota Attorney General to inspect the diocese's files on past and present priests. Carlson also instituted background checks for priests entering the diocese and new employee hires. In March 2019, the diocese published the names of eleven priests accused of child sex abuse of parishioners between 1950 and 1992.

== Bishops ==
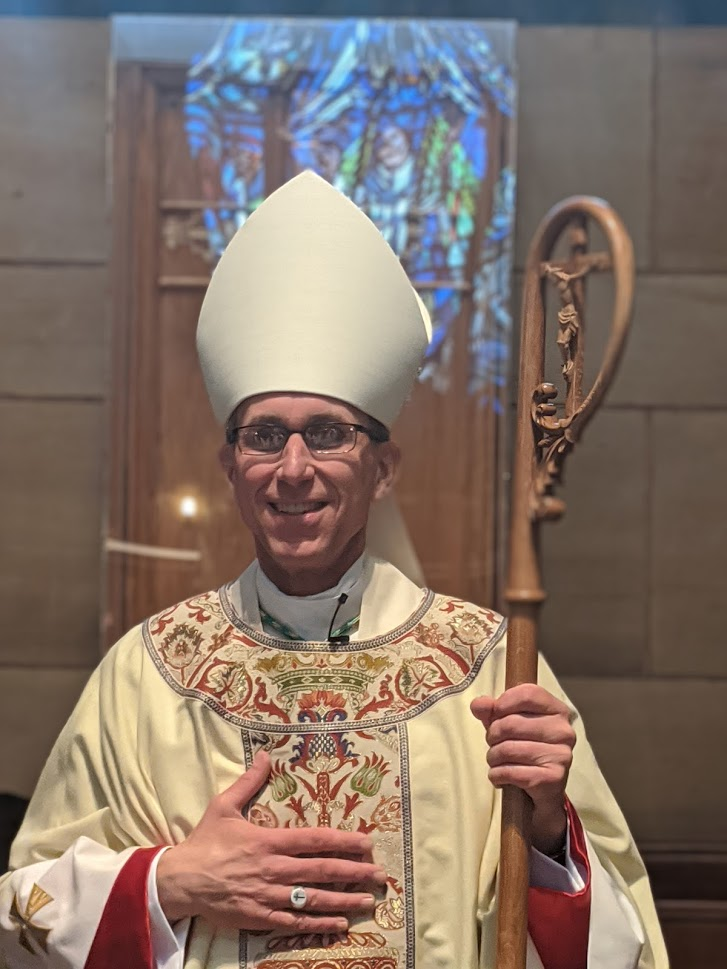
Bishop DeGrood (2020)

=== Vicar Apostolic of Dakota ===
Martin Marty, O.S.B. (1879–1889); see below

=== Bishops of Sioux Falls ===
1. Martin Marty, O.S.B. (1889–1895), appointed bishop of Saint Cloud; see above
2. Thomas O'Gorman, C.S.P. (1896–1921†)
3. Bernard Joseph Mahoney (1922–1939†)
4. William O. Brady (1939–1956), appointed Coadjutor Archbishop and later Archbishop of Saint Paul
5. Lambert Anthony Hoch (1956–1978), retired
6. Paul Vincent Dudley (1978–1995), retired
7. Robert James Carlson (1995–2004), appointed Bishop of Saginaw and later Archbishop of St. Louis
8. Paul J. Swain (2006–2019), retired
9. Donald DeGrood (2020–present)

=== Coadjutor bishop ===
Robert James Carlson (1994–1995)

=== Auxiliary bishop ===
Paul Francis Anderson (1982–1987)

=== Other diocesan priests who became bishops ===
- Thomas Gullickson, appointed Apostolic Nuncio and Titular Archbishop in 2004
- Donald Joseph Kettler, appointed Bishop of Fairbanks in 2002. Later appointed Bishop of Saint Cloud in 2013.

== Education ==
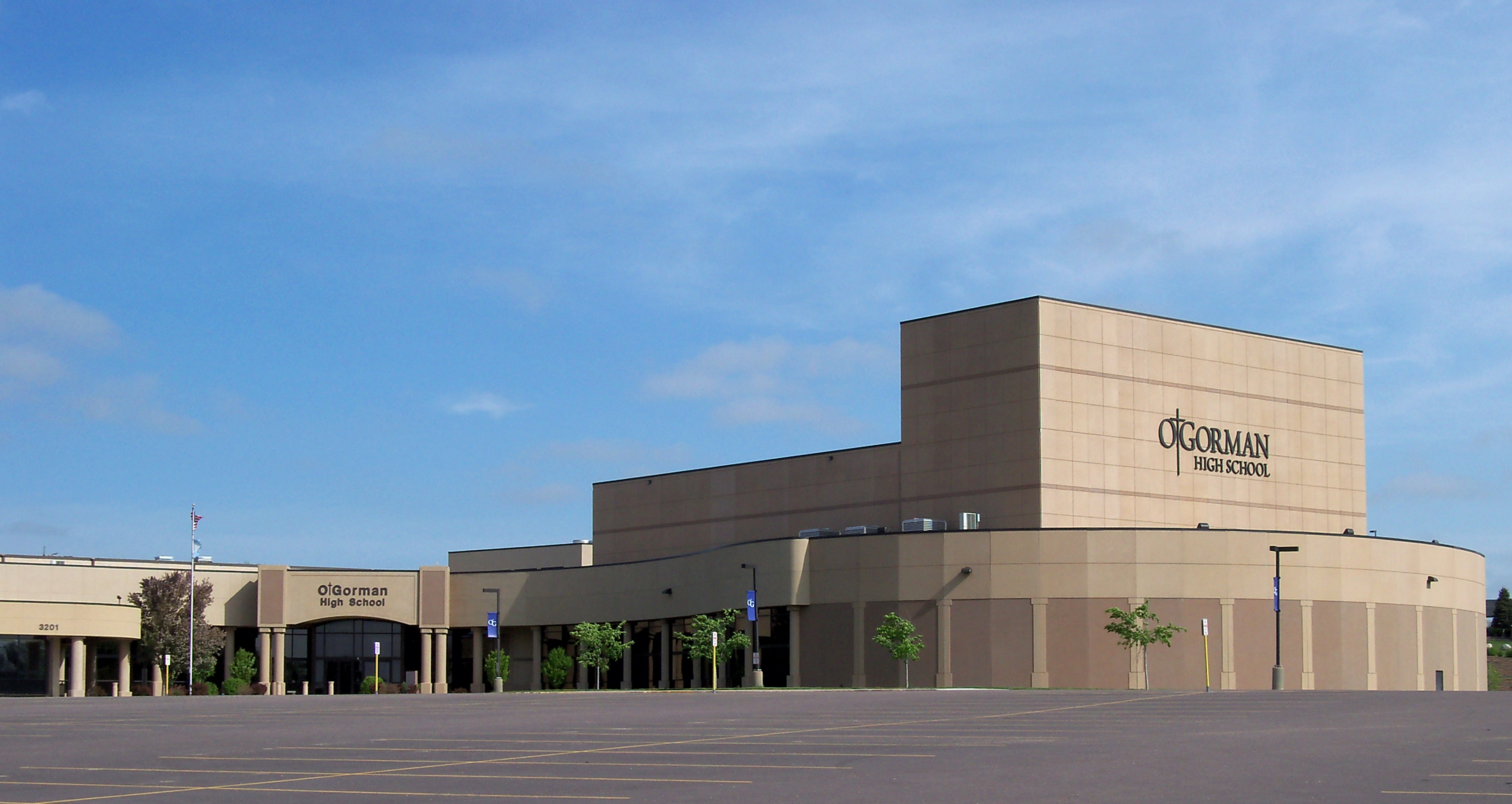
O'Gorman High School in Sioux Falls

=== Higher education ===
Mount Marty University in Yankton is a Catholic university. Presentation College in Aberdeen closed in 2023.

=== Senior and junior/senior high schools ===
- O'Gorman High School - Sioux Falls
- Roncalli Junior/Senior High School – Aberdeen
- St. Mary Junior/Senior High School – Dell Rapids

=== Primary and middle schools ===
- Christ the King School – Sioux Falls
- Holy Spirit School – Sioux Falls
- Holy Trinity School – Huron
- Immaculate Conception School – Watertown
- John Paul II Elementary – Mitchell
- O'Gorman Junior High School – Sioux Falls
- John Paul II School – Pierre
- Risen Savior Preschool – Brandon
- Roncalli Elementary School – Aberdeen
- Roncalli Primary School – Aberdeen
- Sacred Heart Elementary – Yankton
- Sacred Heart Middle School – Yankton
- St. Agnes School – Vermillion
- St. Katherine Drexel School – Sioux Falls
- St. Lambert School – Sioux Falls
- St. Mary School – Salem
- St. Mary School – Sioux Falls
- St. Michael School – Sioux Falls
- St. Peter School – Jefferson
- St. Joseph Indian School – Chamberlain
- St. Joseph School – Pierre
- St. Lawrence School – Milbank
- St. Mary Elementary – Dell Rapids
- St. Thomas School – Madison
- St. Thomas More School – Brookings

== See also ==
- Catholic Church by country
- Catholic Church in the United States
- Ecclesiastical Province of Saint Paul and Minneapolis
- Global organisation of the Catholic Church
- List of Roman Catholic archdioceses (by country and continent)
- List of Roman Catholic dioceses (alphabetical) (including archdioceses)
- List of Roman Catholic dioceses (structured view) (including archdioceses)
- List of the Catholic dioceses of the United States
