= Bernard Joseph Mahoney =

American prelate

The Most Reverend Bernard Joseph Mahoney
- Bishop of Sioux Falls
- Church: Catholic Church
- Diocese: Sioux Falls
- Appointed: May 24, 1922
- Term ended: March 20, 1939 (his death)
- Predecessor: Thomas O'Gorman
- Successor: William O. Brady

Orders
- Ordination: February 27, 1904 by Giuseppe Ceppetelli
- Consecration: June 29, 1922 by Gaetano de Lai

Personal details
- Born: July 24, 1875 Albany, New York, U.S.
- Died: March 20, 1939 (aged 63) Rochester, Minnesota, U.S.

Bernard Joseph Mahoney (July 24, 1875 – March 20, 1939) was an American prelate of the Catholic Church. He served as Bishop of Sioux Falls from 1922 until his death in 1939.

== Biography ==
=== Early life and education ===
Bernard Mahoney was born on July 24, 1875, in Albany, New York, to Daniel and Honora (née O'Connor) Mahoney, who were Irish immigrants. His father worked for the Boston and Albany Railroad and moved the family to Rensselaer when Bernard was still a child. He received his early education at St. John's Academy in Rensselaer, but left school to work as a telegraph operator for Western Union in Albany. He later worked as an Associated Press telegrapher for the Troy Evening Standard and the Albany Knickerbocker Press.

Mahoney was encouraged to study for the priesthood by Rev. James Duffy, the pastor of St. John's in Rensselaer. In the fall of 1895, he entered Mount St. Mary's College in Emmitsburg, Maryland, graduating four years later at the top of his class. He was then sent to Rome to study philosophy and theology at the Pontifical North American College.

=== Priesthood ===
While in Rome, Mahoney was ordained a priest on February 27, 1904, by Giuseppe Ceppetelli. Following his ordination, he returned to New York and served as assistant pastor under Rev. John Walsh at St. Peter's Church in Troy.

In 1909, Mahoney was named to succeed Rev. John Patrick Farrelly as the spiritual director of his alma mater, the Pontifical North American College in Rome. During this time, he also earned the degree of Doctor of Sacred Theology and arranged appointments for Americans seeking a papal audience. In 1917, he was given the title of Monsignor.

=== Bishop of Sioux Falls ===
On May 24, 1922, Mahoney was appointed Bishop of Sioux Falls, South Dakota, by Pope Pius XI. He received his episcopal consecration on the following June 29 in Rome from Cardinal Gaetano de Lai, with Archbishop Giovanni Zonghi and Bishop Giacomo Sinibaldi serving as co-consecrators. He formally took charge of the Diocese of Sioux Falls on October 4, 1922, when he was installed at St. Joseph's Cathedral.

Mahoney's 17 years as bishop were marked by poor economic conditions and a heavy diocesan debt. While the number of priests in the diocese increased from 156 to 174 under his tenure, the total Catholic population fell from 71,000 to 60,000 during the same period. He was also forced to close Columbus College due to financial difficulties in 1929. However, he did establish Cathedral High School in 1926.

Mahoney died on March 20, 1939, at the Mayo Clinic in Rochester, Minnesota, following an operation to have a goitre removed.

Catholic Church titles
Preceded by Thomas O'Gorman	Bishop of Sioux Falls; 1922–1939	Succeeded by William O. Brady
