= Hilary Baumann Hacker =

American prelate

His Excellency, The Most Reverend Hilary Baumann Hacker
- Bishop of Bismarck
- Church: Roman Catholic Church
- See: Diocese of Bismarck
- In office: March 14, 1957 – June 28, 1982
- Predecessor: Lambert Anthony Hoch
- Successor: John Francis Kinney

Orders
- Ordination: June 4, 1938 by John Gregory Murray
- Consecration: February 27, 1957 by William O. Brady

Personal details
- Born: January 10, 1913 New Ulm, Minnesota, US
- Died: November 6, 1990 (aged 77) Bismarck, North Dakota, US
- Education: Nazareth Hall Preparatory Seminary; Saint Paul Seminary; Pontifical Gregorian University
- Motto: Omnia mea tua (All I have is Yours)

Hilary Baumann Hacker (January 10, 1913 – November 6, 1990) was an American prelate of the Roman Catholic Church. He served as bishop of the Diocese of Bismarck in North Dakota from 1957 to 1982.

== Biography ==
=== Early life ===
Hilary Hacker was born on January 10, 1913, to Emil and Sophia (née Bauman) Hacker in New Ulm, Minnesota. He attended Holy Trinity High School in Winsted, Minnesota, for two years before entering Nazareth Hall Preparatory Seminary in St. Paul, Minnesota. Hacker studied at St. Paul Seminary in St. Paul from 1932 to 1938.

=== Priesthood ===
Hacker was ordained to the priesthood for the Archdiocese of St. Paul by Archbishop John Murray on June 4, 1938, in St. Paul. After his ordination, Hacker briefly served as an assistant pastor at Nativity Parish in St. Paul. He was then to Rome for graduate studies at the Pontifical Gregorian University, where he received a degree in canon law. Following his return to Minnesota, Hacker was appointed chancellor of the archdiocese in 1941, then became vicar general in 1945.

=== Bishop of Bismarck ===
On December 29, 1956, Hacker was appointed the fourth bishop of Bismarck by Pope Pius XII. He received his episcopal consecration on February 27, 1957, from Archbishop William Brady, with Bishops Francis Schenk and James Byrne serving as co-consecrators, at the Cathedral of St. Paul in Bismarck. Installed as bishop on March 14, 1957, Hacker was only 44 years old at the time of his appointment and the youngest bishop to be chosen for the church in western North Dakota.

Hacker attended all four sessions of the Second Vatican Council in Rome from 1962 to 1965, and dedicated much of his tenure implementing the council's reforms, especially the Mass of Paul VI and greater participation of the laity. His tenure was also marked by high Catholic school enrollment, as well as the founding of Bishop Ryan High School in Minot, North Dakota, and Trinity High School in Dickenson, North Dakota He also established an annual appeal called God's Share; between 1956 and 1963, the annual collection rose from $165,000 to $225,000.

=== Retirement and legacy ===
Pope John Paul II accepted Hacker's resignation as bishop of Bismarck on June 28, 1982. He spent his retirement at Christ the King Parish in Mandan, North Dakota and later at Emmaus Place, a retirement home for priests in Bismarck.

Hilary Hacker died on November 6, 1990, at age 77 in St. Alexius Medical Center in Bismarck. He is buried in St. Mary's Cemetery, Bismarck.

== Episcopal succession ==
Catholic Church titles
Preceded by Lambert Anthony Hoch	Bishop of Bismarck; 1957–1982	Succeeded by John Francis Kinney
