= Paul Dudley =

Paul Dudley may refer to:

- Paul Dudley (jurist) (1675–1751), Attorney-General of the Province of Massachusetts Bay
- Paul Dudley (American football) (1939–1987), former American football defensive back and running back
- Paul Vincent Dudley (1926–2006), American prelate of the Roman Catholic Church
