= John Roach (bishop) =

20th-century American Catholic bishop (1921–2003)

His Excellency The Most Reverend John Roach
- Archbishop of St. Paul and Minneapolis
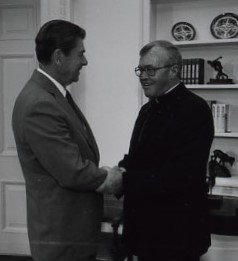
- Roach and President Reagan in the Oval Office in 1982
- Church: Catholic Church
- Appointed: May 21, 1975
- Term ended: September 8, 1995
- Predecessor: Leo Binz
- Successor: Harry Flynn
- Previous posts: Auxiliary Bishop of St. Paul and Minneapolis (1971–1975); Titular Bishop of Cenae (1971–1975)

Orders
- Ordination: June 18, 1946 by John Gregory Murray
- Consecration: September 8, 1971 by Luigi Raimondi, Leo Binz, Leo Christopher Byrne

Personal details
- Born: July 31, 1921 Prior Lake, Minnesota, US
- Died: July 11, 2003 (aged 81) Saint Paul, Minnesota, US
- Buried: Resurrection Cemetery, Mendota Heights
- Denomination: Roman Catholic
- Education: Saint Paul Seminary

Ordination history of John Roach
History
Priestly ordination
- Ordained by: John Gregory Murray
- Date: June 9, 1946
Episcopal consecration
- Principal consecrator: Luigi Raimondi
- Co-consecrators: Leo Binz, Leo Christopher Byrne
- Date: September 8, 1971
Episcopal succession
Bishops consecrated by John Roach as principal consecrator
- Victor Hermann Balke: September 2, 1976
- Paul Vincent Dudley: January 25, 1977
- John Francis Kinney: January 25, 1977
- William Henry Bullock: August 12, 1980
- Robert Henry Brom: May 23, 1983
- Robert James Carlson: January 11, 1984
- Jerome George Hanus, OSB: August 24, 1987
- Joseph Leo Charron, CPPS: January 25, 1990
- Roger Lawrence Schwietz, OMI: February 2, 1990

John Robert Roach (July 31, 1921 – July 11, 2003) was an American Catholic prelate who served as Archbishop of Saint Paul and Minneapolis from 1975 to 1995. Appointed as an auxiliary bishop of the archdiocese in 1971, he his later appointment as archbishop made him the first St. Paul archbishop to have been born in Minnesota. Roach delivered a benediction at Jimmy Carter's inauguration in 1977 and was head of the National Conference of Catholic Bishops from 1980 to 1983. In 1985, he was arrested for drunk driving after crashing into a convenience store; he would later admit to being an alcoholic. Roach was alleged by MPR News to have protected and reassigned a priest accused of molesting girls. Both MPR and the Star Tribune criticised his handling of cases of sexual abuse by clergy. He oversaw a major reorganization and renovation of the Saint Paul Seminary and its affiliation and merger with the University of St. Thomas. He retired at age 74 on September 5, 1995, succeeded by Harry Flynn. Roach died at age 81 on July 11, 2003.

== Early life ==
John Robert Roach was born on July 31, 1921, in Prior Lake, Minnesota, to Simon and Mary Roach. The eldest of three children, he had two younger sisters—Virginia and Mona. Growing up, he worked at the general store in Prior Lake owned by his father. He attended Shakopee High School for two years before transferring in his junior year to Nazareth Hall Preparatory Seminary. In 1941, he began at Saint Paul Seminary. Because of World War II, he was placed on an accelerated path to ordination and was ordained a priest on June 18, 1946, while 24 years old, by Archbishop John Gregory Murray. He would later go on to receive Master of Education degree at the University of Minnesota.

== Priesthood ==
Roach was first assigned to the Church of Saint Stephen in Minneapolis. Only there for the summer, when the fall arrived he was assigned to Saint Thomas Academy where he served as an instructor of Latin and religion. From 1951 to 1968, he was the headmaster of the school. As headmaster, he oversaw the 1965 move of the academy from sharing a campus with the College of Saint Thomas to its own location in Mendota Heights. He was named a monsignor in 1965. From 1968 to 1971, he served as the founding rector of Saint John Vianney Seminary in St. Paul.

== Episcopacy ==
=== Auxiliary bishop ===
On July 12, 1971, at the age of 49, Roach was appointed titular bishop of Cenae and an auxiliary bishop of Saint Paul and Minneapolis; he was consecrated on September 8, 1971, alongside Raymond Alphonse Lucker. Archbishop Luigi Raimondi was the primary consecrator. From 1971 to 1973, Roach served as pastor of St. Charles Borromeo parish in St. Anthony; from 1973 to 1975, he served as pastor of St. Cecilia in St. Paul.

=== Archbishop ===
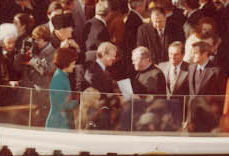
Roach and Carter shaking hands at the Inauguration of Jimmy Carter

Roach was appointed to succeed Leo Binz as Archbishop of Saint Paul and Minneapolis on May 21, 1975, and was installed on July 16, 1975. He was the first priest born in the archdiocese to be named the archbishop. In 1977, Roach delivered a benediction at the inauguration of President Jimmy Carter. Roach served as the president of the National Conference of Catholic Bishops (NCCB) from 1980 to 1983. During his tenure, the NCCB strongly advocated for nuclear disarmament and economic justice. During his last months as president, the NCCB issued a pastoral letter on war and peace, "The Challenge of Peace: God's Promise and Our Response". During the drafting process President Ronald Reagan involved himself, appealing to Holy See for a letter that would distance itself from the Nuclear Freeze campaign. Roach publicly complained about the interference. In addition to his time as NCCB president, Roach also served as chairman of the National Catholic Educational Association from 1986 to 1989, and president of the National Catholic Rural Life Conference. Roach oversaw the implementation of a permanent diaconate program in the Archdiocese in the wake of Vatican II, ordaining the first group of 12 permanent deacons on April 25, 1976.

At a Jewish-Christian interfaith event on May 13, 1977, Roach was giving an acceptance speech for an award when a man threw a chocolate-cream pie at Roach. The man, 22-year-old Patrick Schwartz, said he did so as a protest against the Catholic Church's views on homosexuality. (Note: Schwartz later pled guilty to disorderly conduct and would later attempt to pie Anita Bryant as well.) George Casey, a Jesuit priest and former chaplain to a group for gay Catholics, had offered $20 to anyone who would hit Roach with a pie. In 1985, Roach founded a diocesan AIDS ministry, providing support to those with AIDS and their family members and providing anointing of the sick to those with the disease. The archdiocese also started a support group for gay and lesbian persons wishing to remain celibate.

Roach made national news when he was arrested for drunk driving on February 21, 1985, after driving his car into the wall of a Tom Thumb convenience store in Lindstrom, Minnesota. He was discovered to have a blood alcohol count of 0.19. His license was suspended for 90 days; during that time, he was limited to driving only for official clerical business between Tuesday and Sunday, and required to attend an alcohol education program. During a homily at a Mass before youth at World Youth Day 1993 in Denver, he admitted that he was an alcoholic; he received a standing ovation afterwards.

At the Saint Paul Seminary, Roach oversaw the 1987–1989 renovation of Saint Mary's Chapel, the demolition of the old administration building and construction of a new one, as well as construction of new dormitories. Roach oversaw the 1987 merger and affiliation agreement between the College of Saint Thomas and seminary, which until that point had been separate institutions with adjacent campuses. As part of the affiliation, much of the land of the campus of the seminary was sold to the college to create the current south campus, and the college became the degree-issued institution for the seminary.

His handling of cases of sexual abuse by clergy were criticized as being too lenient by the MPR News and the Star Tribune. In one case, Roach was alleged by MPR News to have protected and reassigned a priest accused of raping girls.

On February 22, 1994, Harry Flynn, the Bishop of Lafayette, Louisiana, was appointed coadjutor bishop and became the presumptive successor of Roach. On September 5, 1995, Roach's retirement was accepted. While Roach was 74, a year younger than the normal retirement age, he said that he considered Flynn ready to take over.

== Retirement and death ==
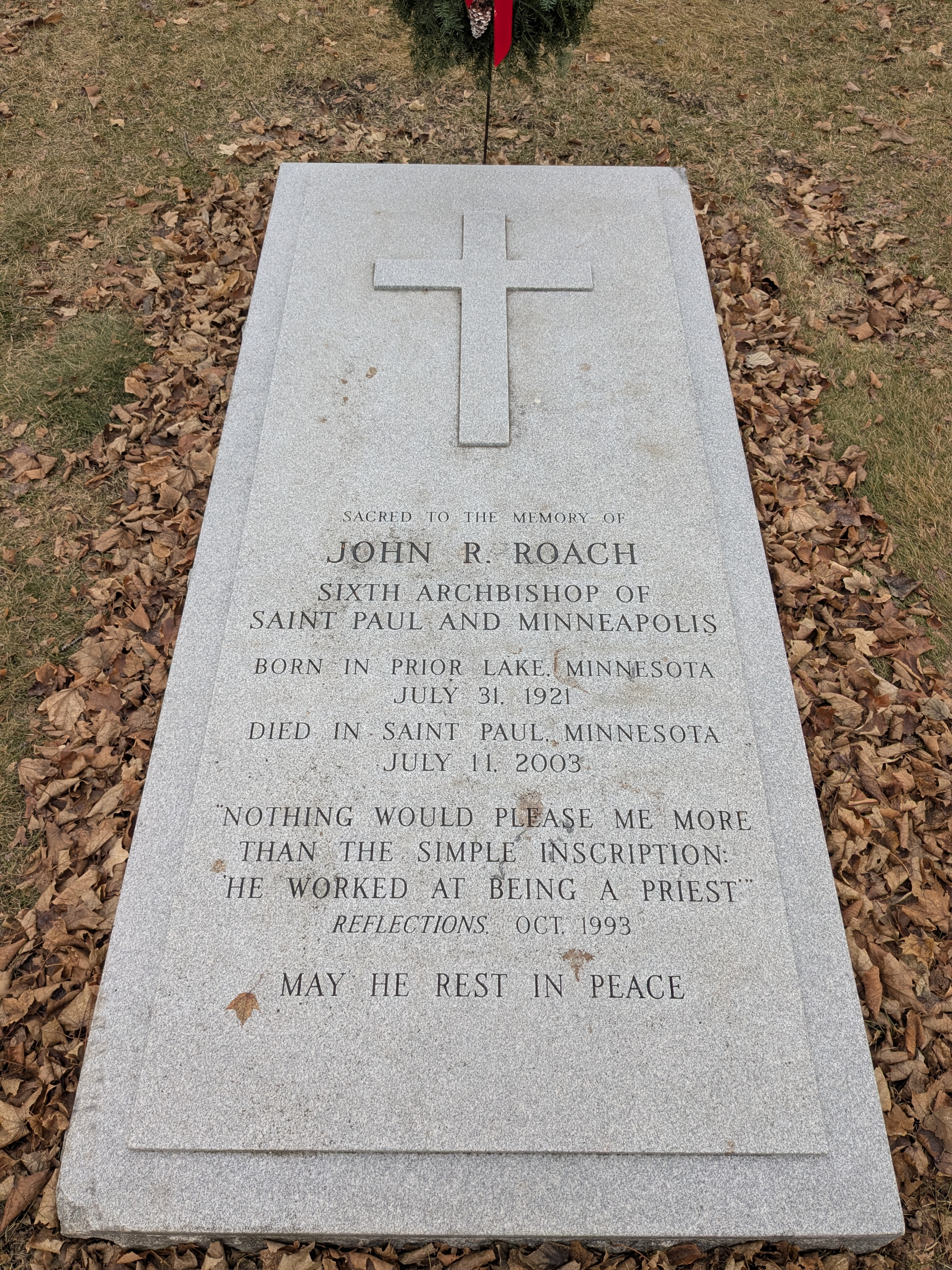
The grave of John Roach at Resurrection Cemetery in Mendota Heights, Minnesota

When he retired, Roach stated that he intended to do mission work in local parishes and work on a project with the National Conference of Catholic Bishops to evaluate Catholic social teaching in Catholic schools. He moved into the same apartment at Saint Thomas Academy that he had lived in when he taught there. The University of St. Thomas changed the name of Albertus Magnus Hall to the John R. Roach Center for Liberal Arts in recognition of his 20 years of service as chairman of the St. Thomas board of trustees, after a $9.8 million ($18.3 million in 2025) renovation to the 1947 Collegiate Gothic building was completed in 2000.

Roach died of heart failure on July 11, 2003, at the Little Sisters of the Poor home in St. Paul at the age of 81. Over 2,500 attended his funeral at the Cathedral of Saint Paul, including 300 priests and 15 bishops. Minnesota Governor Tim Pawlenty and former vice-president Walter Mondale were also in attendance. The sermon was given by Bishop John Kinney. Roach was buried at Resurrection Cemetery in Mendota Heights.

== Notes ==
Catholic Church titles
Preceded by Leo Binz	Archbishop of St. Paul and Minneapolis; 1975–1995	Succeeded by Harry Flynn
Preceded by John R. Quinn	President of the NCCB/USCC; 1980–1983	Succeeded by James W. Malone
