= List of South Dakota Intercollegiate Conference football standings (1920–1955) =

This is a list of yearly South Dakota Intercollegiate Conference football standings.

== South Dakota Intercollegiate Conference football standings ==
=== Pre-NAIA ===
1920 South Dakota Intercollegiate Conference football standings
	Conf.					Overall
Team	W		L		T	W		L		T
Yankton $	4	–	0	–	1	5	–	1	–	2
Dakota Wesleyan	3	–	1	–	0	4	–	3	–	0
Huron	2	–	1	–	1	2	–	2	–	1
Northern Normal	1	–	1	–	0	3	–	2	–	0
Sioux Falls	1	–	2	–	0	1	–	3	–	0
South Dakota Mines	0	–	1	–	0	5	–	1	–	0
Columbus (SD)	0	–	5	–	0	1	–	5	–	0
$ – Conference champion

1921 South Dakota Intercollegiate Conference football standings
	Conf.					Overall
Team	W		L		T	W		L		T
Dakota Wesleyan $	3	–	0	–	0	6	–	2	–	0
Columbus (SD)	2	–	1	–	0	5	–	2	–	0
Huron	1	–	2	–	0	3	–	3	–	0
Yankton	1	–	2	–	0	3	–	4	–	0
South Dakota Mines	1	–	2	–	0	2	–	4	–	1
Northern Normal	1	–	2	–	0	1	–	4	–	0
$ – Conference champion

1922 South Dakota Intercollegiate Conference football standings
	Conf.					Overall
Team	W		L		T	W		L		T
Dakota Wesleyan $	4	–	0	–	0	5	–	2	–	0
Spearfish	3	–	0	–	1	3	–	2	–	1
Yankton	4	–	1	–	0	6	–	2	–	0
South Dakota Mines	3	–	1	–	1	5	–	2	–	1
Columbus (SD)	1	–	1	–	0	2	–	5	–	0
Augustana (SD)	1	–	2	–	0	3	–	4	–	0
Northern Normal	1	–	3	–	0	3	–	3	–	0
Huron	0	–	4	–	0	0	–	5	–	0
Sioux Falls	0	–	5	–	0	0	–	6	–	0
$ – Conference champion

1923 South Dakota Intercollegiate Conference football standings
	Conf.					Overall
Team	W		L		T	W		L		T
Columbus (SD) +	5	–	0	–	0	5	–	1	–	0
Northern Normal +	4	–	0	–	1	4	–	1	–	2
Dakota Wesleyan +	4	–	0	–	1	4	–	2	–	1
South Dakota Mines	3	–	1	–	0	4	–	2	–	0
Augustana (SD)	3	–	3	–	1	4	–	3	–	1
Huron	3	–	3	–	1	3	–	3	–	1
Yankton	2	–	3	–	0	2	–	6	–	0
Eastern Normal	1	–	5	–	0	1	–	5	–	0
Spearfish	0	–	1	–	0	0	–	5	–	0
Southern Normal	0	–	3	–	0	0	–	3	–	0
Sioux Falls	0	–	5	–	0	0	–	5	–	0
+ – Conference co-champions; South Dakota Mines and Spearfish played twice. The second game was not counted in the conference standings.

1924 South Dakota Intercollegiate Conference football standings
	Conf.					Overall
Team	W		L		T	W		L		T
Columbus (SD) $	6	–	0	–	0	6	–	2	–	0
Augustana (SD)	6	–	1	–	0	6	–	2	–	0
South Dakota Mines	5	–	1	–	0	6	–	2	–	0
Yankton	5	–	1	–	0	5	–	2	–	1
Dakota Wesleyan	3	–	1	–	0	4	–	4	–	0
Northern Normal	3	–	3	–	0	4	–	3	–	0
Eastern Normal	2	–	4	–	0	2	–	5	–	0
Sioux Falls	1	–	5	–	0	1	–	5	–	0
Spearfish	0	–	4	–	0	1	–	6	–	0
Southern Normal	0	–	5	–	0	2	–	6	–	1
Huron	0	–	6	–	0	0	–	6	–	0
$ – Conference champion

1925 South Dakota Intercollegiate Conference football standings
	Conf.					Overall
Team	W		L		T	W		L		T
Northern Normal +	5	–	0	–	0	7	–	1	–	0
Yankton +	4	–	0	–	1	4	–	3	–	2
Columbus (SD)	4	–	1	–	0	5	–	2	–	0
Southern Normal	4	–	2	–	1	7	–	2	–	1
Eastern Normal	4	–	3	–	0	4	–	3	–	0
South Dakota Mines	2	–	2	–	0	3	–	6	–	0
Augustana (SD)	3	–	4	–	0	4	–	4	–	0
Dakota Wesleyan	1	–	2	–	1	3	–	4	–	1
Huron	1	–	4	–	2	1	–	4	–	3
Spearfish	0	–	4	–	1	2	–	6	–	1
Sioux Falls	0	–	6	–	0	0	–	6	–	0
+ – Conference co-champions; Sioux Falls forfeited games to Yankton, Columbus, Eastern Normal, Southern Normal, Augustana (SD), and Huron. South Dakota Mines and Spearfish played twice. The second game was not counted in the conference standings.

1926 South Dakota Intercollegiate Conference football standings
	Conf.					Overall
Team	W		L		T	W		L		T
Dakota Wesleyan +	5	–	0	–	0	6	–	1	–	0
Columbus (SD) +	4	–	0	–	0	4	–	2	–	1
South Dakota Mines	3	–	0	–	0	4	–	1	–	1
Southern Normal	4	–	1	–	1	5	–	2	–	1
Northern Normal	3	–	1	–	0	5	–	1	–	0
Yankton	2	–	2	–	1	3	–	3	–	1
Eastern Normal	3	–	4	–	0	3	–	4	–	1
Huron	2	–	3	–	0	2	–	5	–	0
Augustana (SD)	1	–	6	–	0	1	–	7	–	0
Spearfish	0	–	4	–	0	3	–	5	–	1
Sioux Falls	0	–	6	–	0	0	–	6	–	0
+ – Conference co-champions; Spearfish and South Dakota Mines played twice. The second game was not counted in the conference stnadings.

1927 South Dakota Intercollegiate Conference football standings
	Conf.					Overall
Team	W		L		T	W		L		T
South Dakota Mines +	6	–	0	–	0	7	–	1	–	0
Columbus (SD) +	5	–	0	–	0	7	–	0	–	0
Dakota Wesleyan	5	–	1	–	0	5	–	1	–	0
Southern Normal	4	–	2	–	1	4	–	2	–	2
Yankton	2	–	2	–	1	3	–	3	–	1
Huron	2	–	3	–	0	3	–	5	–	0
Augustana (SD)	2	–	3	–	0	2	–	4	–	0
Sioux Falls	1	–	4	–	0	3	–	4	–	0
Spearfish	1	–	4	–	1	1	–	6	–	1
Northern Normal	0	–	4	–	2	0	–	7	–	2
Eastern Normal	0	–	5	–	1	0	–	6	–	1
+ – Conference co-champions

1928 South Dakota Intercollegiate Conference football standings
	Conf.					Overall
Team	W		L		T	W		L		T
Spearfish +	4	–	0	–	0	5	–	2	–	0
Huron +	2	–	0	–	2	4	–	1	–	2
Sioux Falls	3	–	1	–	1	3	–	2	–	1
Yankton	2	–	1	–	2	3	–	2	–	2
Augustana (SD)	3	–	2	–	0	3	–	4	–	1
Southern Normal	3	–	2	–	2	3	–	3	–	2
Columbus (SD)	2	–	2	–	0	5	–	3	–	0
Northern Normal	2	–	2	–	1	2	–	2	–	1
South Dakota Mines	2	–	3	–	0	3	–	5	–	0
Eastern Normal	1	–	5	–	0	2	–	6	–	0
Dakota Wesleyan	0	–	6	–	0	0	–	9	–	0
+ – Conference co-champions; Spearfish and South Dakota Mines played twice. The second game was not counted in the conference standings.

1929 South Dakota Intercollegiate Conference football standings
	Conf.					Overall
Team	W		L		T	W		L		T
Spearfish +	4	–	0	–	0	5	–	2	–	0
Dakota Wesleyan +	4	–	0	–	1	5	–	2	–	1
Yankton	3	–	1	–	1	5	–	2	–	1
Augustana (SD)	3	–	1	–	0	4	–	4	–	0
South Dakota Mines	3	–	2	–	0	3	–	4	–	0
Northern Normal	2	–	2	–	1	4	–	3	–	1
Sioux Falls	2	–	2	–	1	2	–	3	–	2
Eastern Normal	1	–	6	–	0	2	–	6	–	0
Huron	0	–	4	–	0	0	–	8	–	1
Southern Normal	0	–	4	–	2	0	–	6	–	2
+ – Conference co-champions; Spearfish and South Dakota Mines played twice. The second game was not counted in the conference stnadings.

1930 South Dakota Intercollegiate Conference football standings
	Conf.					Overall
Team	W		L		T	W		L		T
Yankton $	4	–	0	–	1	6	–	0	–	2
Northern Normal	4	–	1	–	0	5	–	1	–	1
Southern Normal	4	–	1	–	1	?	–	?	–	?
Dakota Wesleyan	3	–	1	–	0	6	–	3	–	0
Spearfish	3	–	2	–	0	5	–	3	–	0
Eastern Normal	2	–	2	–	1	2	–	2	–	2
Augustana (SD)	2	–	3	–	0	2	–	7	–	0
South Dakota Mines	2	–	4	–	0	3	–	5	–	0
Huron	1	–	6	–	0	1	–	7	–	0
Sioux Falls	0	–	5	–	1	0	–	6	–	1
$ – Conference champion; Sioux Falls and Spearfish played twice. The second game was not counted in the conference standings.

1931 South Dakota Intercollegiate Conference football standings
	Conf.					Overall
Team	W		L		T	W		L		T
Northern Normal $	3	–	0	–	1	4	–	2	–	2
Yankton	3	–	1	–	2	4	–	2	–	3
Southern Normal	5	–	2	–	0	5	–	4	–	0
Sioux Falls	2	–	2	–	1	3	–	3	–	1
Huron	1	–	1	–	4	1	–	2	–	4
Augustana (SD)	2	–	2	–	0	2	–	5	–	0
South Dakota Mines	2	–	3	–	0	2	–	5	–	0
Dakota Wesleyan	2	–	3	–	1	2	–	6	–	1
Spearfish	0	–	3	–	0	1	–	5	–	0
Eastern Normal	0	–	3	–	1	0	–	3	–	1
$ – Conference champion

1932 South Dakota Intercollegiate Conference football standings
	Conf.					Overall
Team	W		L		T	W		L		T
Augustana (SD) +	5	–	0	–	0	6	–	1	–	0
Spearfish +	3	–	0	–	1	7	–	0	–	1
Northern Normal	3	–	1	–	0	5	–	3	–	0
Yankton	3	–	1	–	2	4	–	2	–	2
Southern Normal	2	–	1	–	2	4	–	1	–	2
Dakota Wesleyan	2	–	3	–	0	3	–	5	–	0
Sioux Falls	1	–	3	–	0	2	–	5	–	0
South Dakota Mines	1	–	3	–	0	1	–	6	–	0
Eastern Normal	0	–	4	–	0	1	–	4	–	0
Huron	0	–	4	–	1	0	–	4	–	1
+ – Conference co-champions; Spearfish and South Dakota Mines played twice. The second game was not counted in the conference stnadings.

1933 South Dakota Intercollegiate Conference football standings
	Conf.					Overall
Team	W		L		T	W		L		T
Augustana (SD) +	4	–	0	–	0	5	–	2	–	0
Northern Normal +	4	–	0	–	1	4	–	2	–	2
Huron	4	–	1	–	2	4	–	1	–	2
South Dakota Mines	3	–	1	–	0	4	–	3	–	0
Yankton	3	–	2	–	1	3	–	3	–	2
Eastern Normal	2	–	2	–	0	3	–	2	–	1
Southern Normal	2	–	4	–	0	3	–	5	–	0
Sioux Falls	1	–	4	–	0	3	–	4	–	0
Dakota Wesleyan	1	–	6	–	0	1	–	6	–	0
Spearfish	0	–	4	–	0	1	–	7	–	0
+ – Conference co-champions; South Dakota Mines and Spearfish played twice. The second game was not counted in the conference stnadings.

1934 South Dakota Intercollegiate Conference football standings
	Conf.					Overall
Team	W		L		T	W		L		T
Huron +	5	–	0	–	0	5	–	0	–	0
Spearfish +	4	–	0	–	0	7	–	1	–	0
Augustana (SD) +	4	–	0	–	0	6	–	2	–	0
Sioux Falls	5	–	2	–	0	6	–	2	–	0
Yankton	3	–	3	–	0	4	–	4	–	0
South Dakota Mines	2	–	2	–	0	2	–	4	–	0
Southern Normal	1	–	3	–	1	1	–	3	–	2
Northern Normal	1	–	5	–	0	2	–	6	–	0
Eastern Normal	0	–	4	–	0	1	–	4	–	0
Dakota Wesleyan	0	–	6	–	1	0	–	7	–	1
+ – Conference co-champions; South Dakota Mines and Spearfish played twice. The second game was not counted in the conference stnadings.

1935 South Dakota Intercollegiate Conference football standings
	Conf.					Overall
Team	W		L		T	W		L		T
Spearfish +	5	–	0	–	0	8	–	0	–	0
Augustana (SD) +	5	–	0	–	0	7	–	2	–	0
Huron	5	–	1	–	0	5	–	2	–	0
Southern Normal	3	–	2	–	0	3	–	3	–	0
Sioux Falls	3	–	3	–	0	4	–	4	–	0
Dakota Wesleyan	2	–	3	–	0	3	–	4	–	0
Yankton	2	–	3	–	0	3	–	5	–	0
Northern Normal	1	–	5	–	0	2	–	6	–	0
Eastern Normal	0	–	4	–	0	0	–	5	–	0
South Dakota Mines	0	–	5	–	0	0	–	6	–	0
+ – Conference co-champions

1936 South Dakota Intercollegiate Conference football standings
	Conf.					Overall
Team	W		L		T	W		L		T
Augustana (SD) +	4	–	0	–	0	8	–	1	–	0
Dakota Wesleyan +	5	–	0	–	1	5	–	2	–	1
Northern Normal	4	–	2	–	0	6	–	2	–	0
Spearfish	2	–	1	–	1	5	–	1	–	1
Yankton	3	–	2	–	1	4	–	3	–	1
Southern Normal	2	–	2	–	0	5	–	2	–	0
Huron	2	–	4	–	0	3	–	5	–	0
South Dakota Mines	1	–	3	–	0	1	–	6	–	1
Eastern Normal	0	–	4	–	0	0	–	5	–	0
Sioux Falls	0	–	5	–	1	0	–	7	–	1
+ – Conference co-champions

1937 South Dakota Intercollegiate Conference football standings
	Conf.					Overall
Team	W		L		T	W		L		T
Augustana (SD) $	4	–	0	–	0	8	–	0	–	0
South Dakota Mines	4	–	1	–	0	5	–	3	–	0
Southern Normal	4	–	1	–	0	5	–	3	–	0
Yankton	4	–	2	–	0	4	–	2	–	1
Northern Normal	3	–	2	–	0	4	–	5	–	0
Dakota Wesleyan	1	–	2	–	0	3	–	4	–	0
Sioux Falls	1	–	3	–	0	4	–	4	–	0
Spearfish	1	–	4	–	0	2	–	5	–	0
Huron	1	–	5	–	0	1	–	6	–	1
Eastern Normal	0	–	3	–	0	1	–	5	–	0
$ – Conference champion

1938 South Dakota Intercollegiate Conference football standings
	Conf.					Overall
Team	W		L		T	W		L		T
South Dakota Mines $	5	–	0	–	0	8	–	0	–	0
Dakota Wesleyan	4	–	1	–	0	5	–	3	–	0
Yankton	4	–	2	–	0	5	–	3	–	0
Southern Normal	3	–	2	–	0	4	–	2	–	0
Augustana (SD)	2	–	2	–	1	5	–	2	–	1
Huron	3	–	3	–	0	5	–	3	–	0
Northern Normal	2	–	3	–	1	2	–	4	–	2
Sioux Falls	1	–	4	–	0	1	–	7	–	0
Eastern Normal	0	–	3	–	0	1	–	6	–	0
Spearfish	0	–	4	–	0	3	–	4	–	0
$ – Conference champion; Yankton initially won the conference title with a 5–1 mark, but later forfeited and their win over South Dakota Mines and the title because of an ineligible player.

1939 South Dakota Intercollegiate Conference football standings
	Conf.					Overall
Team	W		L		T	W		L		T
Augustana (SD) $	5	–	0	–	0	6	–	2	–	0
Northern State	3	–	1	–	1	5	–	1	–	1
Yankton	3	–	1	–	1	4	–	3	–	1
Huron	3	–	3	–	0	4	–	4	–	0
South Dakota Mines	2	–	2	–	0	3	–	4	–	0
Dakota Wesleyan	2	–	3	–	0	2	–	5	–	0
Sioux Falls	2	–	3	–	0	2	–	6	–	0
Spearfish	1	–	3	–	0	3	–	4	–	0
Southern Normal	1	–	4	–	0	2	–	5	–	0
Eastern Normal	0	–	2	–	0	0	–	4	–	1
$ – Conference champion

1940 South Dakota Intercollegiate Conference football standings
	Conf.					Overall
Team	W		L		T	W		L		T
Northern State $	3	–	0	–	0	7	–	2	–	0
Spearfish	2	–	0	–	1	4	–	2	–	2
South Dakota Mines	1	–	1	–	1	2	–	5	–	1
Eastern Normal	1	–	2	–	0	1	–	5	–	0
Southern Normal	0	–	4	–	0	0	–	8	–	0
$ – Conference champion

1941 South Dakota Intercollegiate Conference football standings
	Conf.					Overall
Team	W		L		T	W		L		T
Black Hills	2	–	1	–	0	6	–	2	–	0
South Dakota Mines	2	–	1	–	0	4	–	2	–	1
Southern Normal	1	–	2	–	0	2	–	4	–	0
Eastern Normal	1	–	2	–	0	1	–	4	–	0

1946 South Dakota Intercollegiate Conference football standings
	Conf.					Overall
Team	W		L		T	W		L		T
Black Hills $	3	–	0	–	0	5	–	2	–	0
Northern State	1	–	0	–	0	6	–	2	–	0
Southern State (SD)	1	–	1	–	0	2	–	4	–	0
South Dakota Mines	1	–	2	–	0	2	–	6	–	0
Eastern Normal	0	–	3	–	0	0	–	5	–	0
$ – Conference champion

1947 South Dakota Intercollegiate Conference football standings
	Conf.					Overall
Team	W		L		T	W		L		T
South Dakota Mines $	3	–	1	–	0	4	–	2	–	2
Northern State	2	–	1	–	0	6	–	3	–	0
Black Hills	1	–	1	–	1	3	–	4	–	2
General Beadle	1	–	2	–	0	2	–	5	–	0
Southern State (SD)	0	–	2	–	1	0	–	6	–	1
$ – Conference champion

1948 South Dakota Intercollegiate Conference football standings
	Conf.					Overall
Team	W		L		T	W		L		T
Northern State $	5	–	0	–	0	7	–	1	–	0
Southern State (SD)	4	–	3	–	0	5	–	3	–	0
South Dakota Mines	2	–	2	–	0	5	–	3	–	0
General Beadle	2	–	2	–	1	4	–	3	–	1
Huron	2	–	2	–	0	4	–	4	–	1
Yankton	2	–	3	–	0	3	–	4	–	1
Black Hills	1	–	3	–	0	2	–	7	–	0
Sioux Falls	0	–	3	–	1	1	–	6	–	1
$ – Conference champion

1949 South Dakota Intercollegiate Conference football standings
	Conf.					Overall
Team	W		L		T	W		L		T
Southern State (SD) $	5	–	0	–	1	7	–	0	–	1
Huron	4	–	1	–	0	6	–	2	–	1
Black Hills	3	–	1	–	0	5	–	4	–	1
Dakota Wesleyan	2	–	2	–	1	3	–	3	–	2
South Dakota Mines	1	–	1	–	2	2	–	3	–	2
Yankton	2	–	3	–	0	2	–	6	–	0
Sioux Falls	1	–	4	–	0	1	–	7	–	0
General Beadle	1	–	5	–	0	2	–	7	–	0
Northern State	0	–	2	–	2	1	–	5	–	2
$ – Conference champion

1950 South Dakota Intercollegiate Conference football standings
	Conf.					Overall
Team	W		L		T	W		L		T
Northern State $	4	–	0	–	0	5	–	3	–	0
Huron	6	–	1	–	0	6	–	3	–	0
Black Hills	4	–	1	–	0	5	–	2	–	1
Southern State (SD)	5	–	2	–	0	6	–	2	–	0
General Beadle	3	–	2	–	0	4	–	2	–	0
South Dakota Mines	2	–	4	–	0	3	–	5	–	0
Dakota Wesleyan	1	–	5	–	1	1	–	6	–	1
Yankton	0	–	5	–	2	1	–	6	–	2
Sioux Falls	0	–	5	–	1	0	–	7	–	1
$ – Conference champion

1951 South Dakota Intercollegiate Conference football standings
	Conf.					Overall
Team	W		L		T	W		L		T
South Dakota Mines $	6	–	0	–	0	8	–	0	–	0
Southern State (SD)	6	–	1	–	0	6	–	1	–	1
Black Hills	3	–	1	–	0	6	–	2	–	0
Northern State	3	–	2	–	0	4	–	4	–	0
Huron	3	–	3	–	0	5	–	3	–	0
Yankton	3	–	3	–	0	3	–	4	–	0
General Beadle	1	–	4	–	0	1	–	5	–	0
Sioux Falls	0	–	5	–	0	0	–	7	–	0
Dakota Wesleyan	0	–	6	–	0	0	–	6	–	0
$ – Conference champion

1952 South Dakota Intercollegiate Conference football standings
	Conf.					Overall
Team	W		L		T	W		L		T
Northern State $	4	–	1	–	0	6	–	1	–	0
Huron	6	–	2	–	0	6	–	2	–	0
Yankton	4	–	2	–	0	5	–	2	–	0
Black Hills	3	–	2	–	0	5	–	3	–	0
Southern State (SD)	4	–	3	–	0	4	–	3	–	0
Dakota Wesleyan	3	–	3	–	0	3	–	4	–	0
South Dakota Mines	2	–	4	–	0	2	–	5	–	0
General Beadle	1	–	4	–	0	1	–	4	–	0
Sioux Falls	0	–	6	–	0	0	–	7	–	0
$ – Conference champion

1953 South Dakota Intercollegiate Conference football standings
	Conf.					Overall
Team	W		L		T	W		L		T
Northern State $	6	–	0	–	0	8	–	0	–	0
Huron	5	–	2	–	0	6	–	3	–	0
Southern State (SD)	4	–	2	–	0	6	–	2	–	0
South Dakota Mines	4	–	2	–	0	4	–	4	–	1
Dakota Wesleyan	3	–	3	–	0	5	–	3	–	0
Yankton	3	–	4	–	0	3	–	5	–	0
Sioux Falls	1	–	4	–	0	2	–	5	–	0
Black Hills	1	–	5	–	0	2	–	7	–	0
General Beadle	0	–	5	–	0	0	–	6	–	0
$ – Conference champion

1954 South Dakota Intercollegiate Conference football standings
	Conf.					Overall
Team	W		L		T	W		L		T
Southern State (SD) +	6	–	1	–	0	6	–	1	–	0
Northern State +	6	–	1	–	0	6	–	2	–	0
Huron	5	–	2	–	0	6	–	3	–	0
Dakota Wesleyan	5	–	3	–	0	5	–	3	–	0
South Dakota Mines	3	–	3	–	0	4	–	4	–	0
Black Hills	2	–	4	–	0	5	–	4	–	0
Yankton	2	–	5	–	0	2	–	6	–	0
Sioux Falls	1	–	5	–	0	0	–	7	–	0
General Beadle	0	–	6	–	0	1	–	6	–	0
+ – Conference co-champions

1955 South Dakota Intercollegiate Conference football standings
	Conf.					Overall
Team	W		L		T	W		L		T
Northern State $	7	–	0	–	0	9	–	1	–	0
Huron	5	–	1	–	1	5	–	2	–	1
Southern State (SD)	5	–	2	–	0	6	–	2	–	0
Dakota Wesleyan	3	–	2	–	2	4	–	3	–	2
Yankton	3	–	4	–	1	3	–	4	–	1
South Dakota Mines	2	–	3	–	2	2	–	4	–	2
Black Hills	1	–	3	–	2	1	–	4	–	2
General Beadle	1	–	6	–	0	1	–	6	–	0
Sioux Falls	0	–	6	–	0	0	–	7	–	0
$ – Conference champion
