= Thomas O'Gorman =

American prelate

His Excellency, The Right Reverend Thomas O'Gorman
- Bishop of Sioux Falls
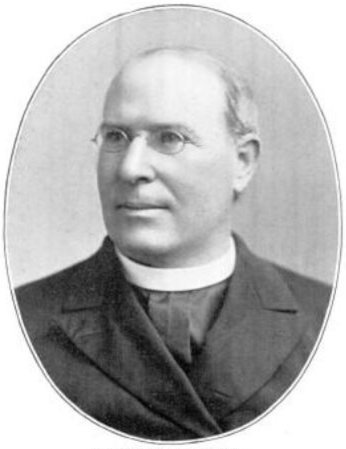
- Diocese: Sioux Falls
- Predecessor: Martin Marty
- Successor: Bernard Joseph Mahoney

Orders
- Ordination: November 5, 1885 by Thomas Langdon Grace
- Consecration: April 19, 1896 by Francesco Satolli

Personal details
- Born: May 1, 1843 Boston, Massachusetts, US
- Died: September 18, 1921 (aged 78) Sioux Falls, South Dakota, US
- Motto: Pro ovibus (For the sheep)

Thomas O'Gorman (May 1, 1843 – September 18, 1921) was an American prelate of the Roman Catholic Church. He served as Bishop of Sioux Falls from 1896 until his death in 1921.

== Biography ==
=== Early life ===
Thomas O'Gorman was born on May 1, 1843, in Boston, Massachusetts, to John and Margaret (née O'Keefe) O'Gorman. He and his parents moved to Chicago, Illinois, when he was still a child, and then to Saint Paul, Minnesota. In 1853, O'Gorman and John Ireland were chosen by Bishop Joseph Crétin to study for the priesthood in France.

=== Priesthood ===
Upon his return to Minnesota, O'Gorman was ordained a priest for the Diocese of Saint Paul on November 5, 1865, in the Cathedral of Saint Paul by Bishop Thomas Langdon Grace, He then served as pastor of St. John Church in Rochester, Minnesota. until 1878, when he joined the Paulist Fathers in their missionary work in New York and also served as a curate at St. Paul Church.

He returned to Minnesota in 1882 and was then appointed pastor of Immaculate Conception Church at Faribault. In 1885 he became the first president of the newly established College of St. Thomas, where he also served as professor of dogmatic theology. He was named professor of church history at Catholic University of America in Washington, D.C. in 1890. During his tenure at Washington, he wrote A History of the Roman Catholic Church in the United States.

=== Bishop of Sioux Falls ===
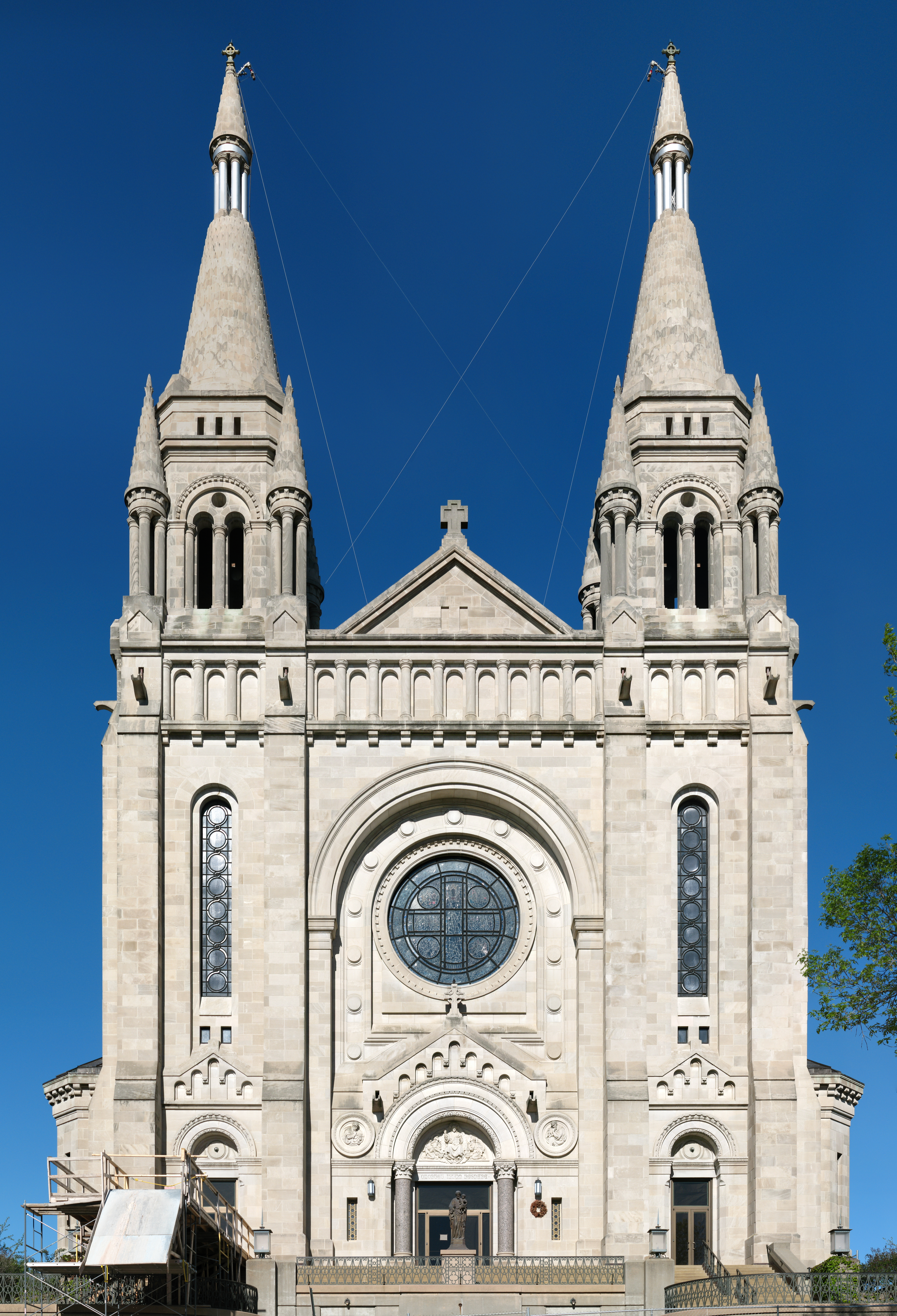
St. Joseph Cathedral, Sioux Falls, South Dakota (2010)

On January 24, 1896, O'Gorman was appointed the second bishop of Sioux Falls by Pope Leo XIII. He received his episcopal consecration on April 19, 1896, from Cardinal Francesco Satolli, with Bishops John Joseph Keane and Martin Marty, serving as co-consecrators, at St. Patrick Church in Washington, D.C. He was installed at Sioux Falls on May 1, 1896. During his 25-year-long tenure, he increased the number of priests and Catholics in the diocese, and erected numerous churches, schools, and hospitals. He dedicated St. Joseph's Cathedral in Sioux Falls in 1919, and founded Columbus College in Sioux Falls in 1921.

=== Death and legacy ===
O'Gorman died from a cerebral hemorrhage in Sioux Falls on September 18, 1921, at age 78.O'Gorman Catholic High School in Sioux Falls is named in his honor.

Catholic Church titles
Preceded by Martin Marty	Bishop of Sioux Falls; 1896–1921	Succeeded by Bernard Joseph Mahoney
