= Donald DeGrood =

American Catholic prelate (born 1965)

His Excellency, The Most Reverend Donald DeGrood
- Bishop of Sioux Falls
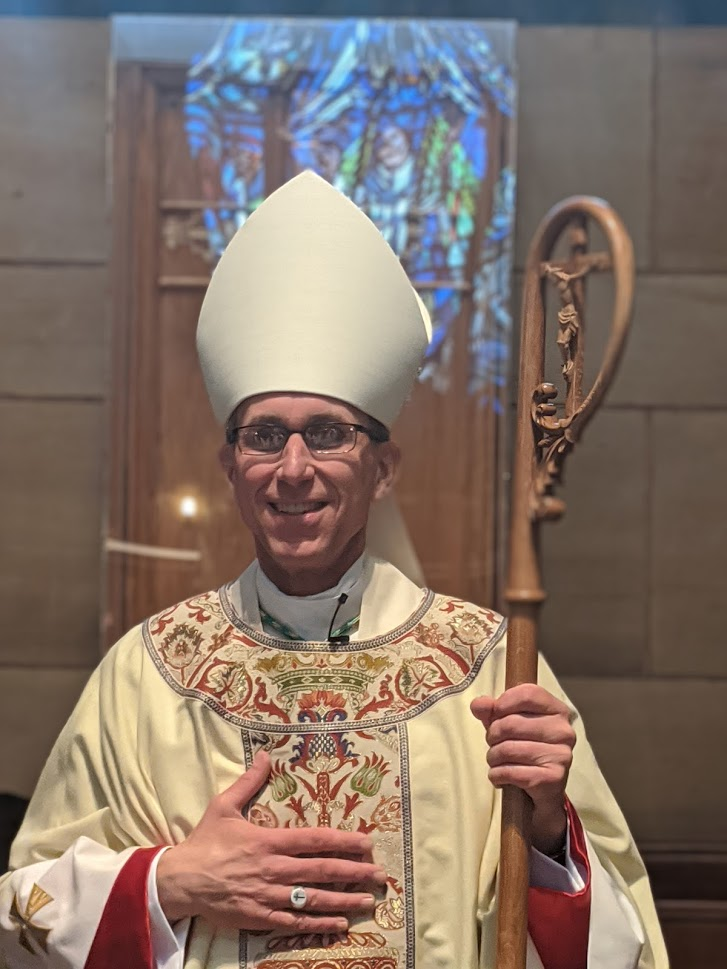
- DeGrood in 2020
- Diocese: Sioux Falls
- Appointed: December 12, 2019
- Installed: February 13, 2020
- Predecessor: Paul J. Swain

Orders
- Ordination: May 31, 1997 by Harry Joseph Flynn
- Consecration: February 13, 2020 by Bernard Hebda, Paul J. Swain, and Andrew H. Cozzens

Personal details
- Born: Donald Edward DeGrood; February 14, 1965 (age 61) Faribault, Minnesota, US
- Education: University of Saint Thomas; Saint John Vianney College Seminary; Saint Paul Seminary
- Motto: God is Love
- Styles
- Reference style: His Excellency; The Most Reverend
- Spoken style: Your Excellency
- Religious style: Bishop

Donald Edward DeGrood (born February 14, 1965) is an American Catholic prelate serving as Bishop of Sioux Falls in South Dakota since 2019.

== Biography ==
=== Early life ===
DeGrood was born in Faribault, Minnesota, on February 14, 1965, the fourth of five sons of Robert and Joanne DeGrood. He grew up in Faribault on his family's farm. He finished Bethlehem Academy High School in Faribault in 1983.

While attending the University of Saint Thomas in Saint Paul, DeGrood decided to enter Saint John Vianney College Seminary in Saint Paul. He graduated from Saint John in 1987 with a Bachelor of Arts in philosophy, but chose not to pursue the priesthood at that time.

For the next six years, DeGrood worked first as a shoe salesman and manager, then as a feed specialist for the Land O’ Lakes Agricultural Cooperative in Minneapolis.

=== Priesthood ===
In 1993, DeGrood decided to pursue the priesthood at the Saint Paul Seminary in St. Paul in 1993, receiving a Master of Divinity degree there in 1997.

He was ordained a priest at the Cathedral of Saint Paul in St. Paul for the Archdiocese of Saint Paul and Minneapolis on May 31, 1997, by Archbishop Harry Flynn. After his ordination, the archdiocese assigned DeGrood as associate pastor at All Saints Parish in Lakeville, Minnesota.

The archdiocese moved DeGrood from All Saints in 2000 to become spiritual director at Saint John Vianney College Seminary. He left the seminary in 2004 after his appointment as pastor of St. Peter's Parish in Forest Lake. DeGrood served at St. Peter's for the next nine years.

In 2013, DeGrood became pastor of Blessed Sacrament Parish in St. Paul, serving there until 2015. A parishioner who had been sexually abused by a priest in that parish later said that DeGrood was "pivotal" in his healing process. While serving at Blessed Sacrament, he also worked as vicar for clergy for the archdiocese. From July 2017 until he was appointed as bishop, DeGrood served as pastor of Saint John the Baptist Parish in Savage.

== Bishop of Sioux Falls ==
On December 12, 2019, DeGrood was named bishop of Sioux Falls by Pope Francis. Because the quinquennial visit ad limina visits of the United States bishops were ongoing during this period, DeGrood was able to visit Rome and meet with Francis in between his appointment and his consecration. DeGrood was consecrated as a bishop and installed on February 13, 2020, by Archbishop Bernard Hebda, with Bishop Paul J. Swain and Bishop Andrew H. Cozzens as co-consecrators, at the Cathedral of Saint Joseph in Sioux Falls. DeGrood's crosier was carved by one of his brothers from a tree on their family farm.

In July 2022, DeGrood issued a new policy for the treatment of non-binary and transgender students at the diocesan Catholic schools. The policy restricted them to bathrooms corresponding to their birth gender and prohibited staff and other students from addressing them with their preferred pronouns.

On May 1, 2025, a letter from Andrew Young, vicar general of the diocese, announced that due to DeGrood's declining health, DeGrood's pastoral governance would be entrusted to the retired bishop of the Diocese of Saint Cloud, Donald Joseph Kettler, until further notice. On August 13, 2025, the diocese made an announcement that DeGrood was reinstated.

== See also ==
- Catholic Church hierarchy
- Catholic Church in the United States
- Historical list of the Catholic bishops of the United States
- List of Catholic bishops of the United States
- Lists of patriarchs, archbishops, and bishops

Catholic Church titles
| Preceded by Paul J. Swain | Bishop of Sioux Falls; 2020-Present | Succeeded by Incumbent |
