= St. Mary High School (Dell Rapids, South Dakota) =

St. Mary's Catholic School

Location
- 812 North State Avenue; Dell Rapids, (Minnehaha County), South Dakota 57022; United States; 43°49′40″N 96°42′29″W

Information
- Type: Private, Coeducational
- Religious affiliation: Roman Catholic
- Established: 1910
- Superintendent: Fr. Shane D. Stevens
- Principal: Casey Michel
- Chaplain: Fr. Brian Eckrich
- Grades: Kindergarten - 12th grade
- Colors: Red and White
- Fight song: On Wisconsin
- Athletics conference: Dakota Valley Conference
- Mascot: Cardinal
- Team name: Cardinals
- Athletic Director: Casey Michel
- Website: www.stmarysdellrapids.org

== Overview ==
Founded in 1910, St. Mary's Catholic School is a private, Roman Catholic K-12 school in Dell Rapids, South Dakota. It is located in the Roman Catholic Diocese of Sioux Falls. School colors are red and white. The school's mascot is the Cardinal. The current sigil for the school is a red, white, and black shield - featuring an open Bible with the Alpha and Omega symbol, an "M" for the Virgin Mary with a crown, a monstrance containing the Eucharist, hands praying the rosary, and a cross in the center. A ribbon on the bottom of the shield states "St. Mary's Catholic Schools Est. 1910".

== Recent construction ==
Due to limited expansion of enrollment and safety concerns, in late 2021 the decision was made to tear down the original 112 year old school building and build a new one in its stead. The demolition started on March 1st, 2022 and was finished in a few weeks. Construction on the new building started in the summer of 2022 and was finished in early 2024.

The new building's cost was around $15 million USD. Supported by the local community and the Diocese of Sioux Falls, enough money was raised for the construction. This new building included a completely new elementary school and major renovations to the connected high school.
