= O'Gorman Catholic High School =

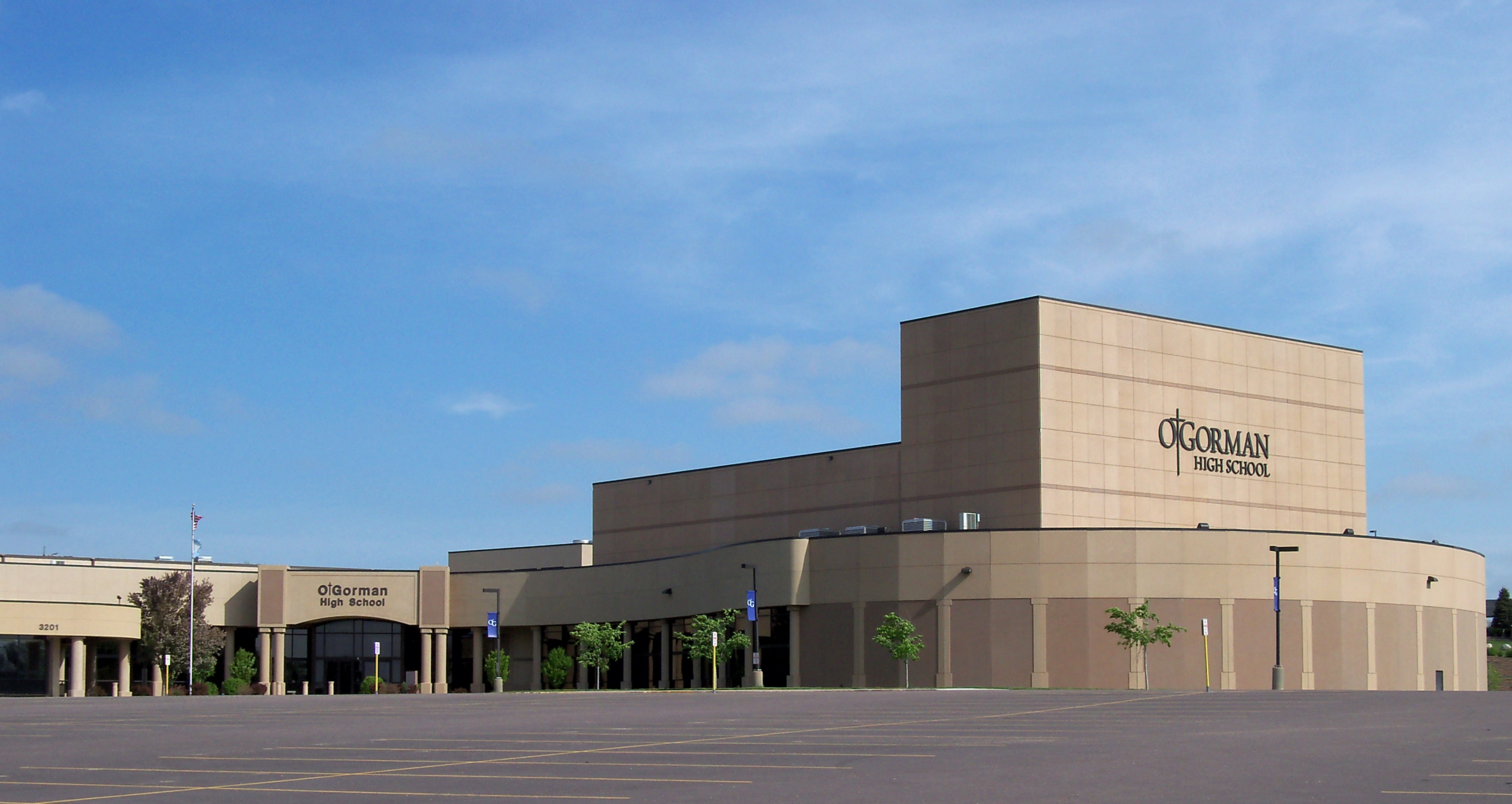
- O'Gorman High School from the southeast

Location
- 3201 South Kiwanis Avenue; Sioux Falls, South Dakota 57105; United States; 43°31′01″N 96°45′47″W

Information
- Type: Private, Coeducational
- Motto: To form a community of faith and learning by promoting a Catholic way of life through Gospel values and academic excellence.
- Religious affiliation: Catholic
- Established: 1961; 65 years ago
- School district: Bishop O'Gorman Catholic Schools
- Oversight: Roman Catholic Diocese of Sioux Falls
- CEEB code: 421175
- Principal: Dawn Hoeke
- Chaplain: Gerald Thornton
- Teaching staff: 59.4 (on an FTE basis)
- Grades: 9-12
- Student to teacher ratio: 12.9
- Colors: Royal Blue and White
- Song: O'Gorman Knights! O'Gorman Knights!
- Fight song: Oh Cheer For The White & The Blue
- Athletics conference: Metro Conference
- Nickname: Knights
- Rival: Roosevelt High School Washington High School
- Accreditation: North Central Association of Colleges and Schools Blue Ribbon
- Newspaper: Knight Scroll
- Yearbook: Knight Legend
- Tuition: $5,745 (minimum)
- Website: oghs.ogknights.org

O'Gorman High School is a Catholic high school in Sioux Falls, South Dakota. The school was founded in 1961 and named after Bishop Thomas O'Gorman. O'Gorman is located in the Diocese of Sioux Falls.

== History ==
The school opened in 1961, and high school students in the Diocese of Sioux Falls transitioned from the Cathedral School to O'Gorman. From 2008 to 2011, O'Gorman underwent a major addition that added two academic wings, a new chapel, and a new performing arts center.

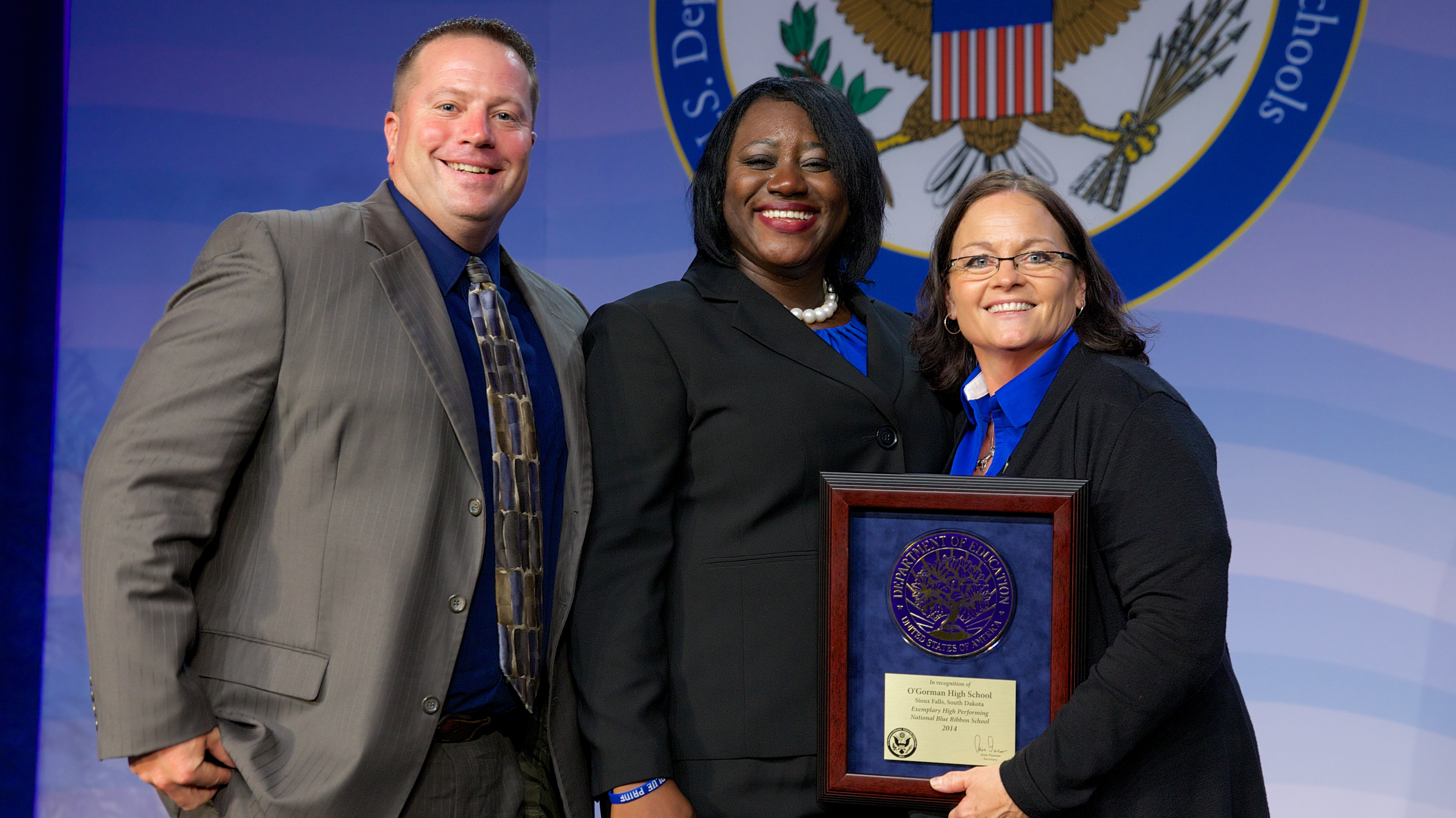
2014 National Blue Ribbon Schools Winner

OGHS was named a No Child Left Behind Blue Ribbon School in 1985, 2005, 2014, and 2021.

== Athletics ==
O'Gorman is a member of the South Dakota High School Activities Association. O'Gorman started the Dakota Bowl in 1978, recognized as one of the first high school bowl games.

State Championships
Sport	Year (s)
Boys Football	1968, 1978, 1981, 1985, 1986, 1988, 1991, 1993, 2004, 2005, 2019
Boys Basketball	2006, 2007, 2010, 2011, 2012, 2017
Boys Cross Country	1994
Boys Tennis	1980, 1981, 1982, 1983, 1988, 1989, 1990, 2003, 2005, 2009, 2010, 2011, 2026
Boys Golf	1976, 2001, 2002, 2003, 2010, 2011, 2013, 2021
Boys Soccer	2020
Girls Basketball	1995, 2017, 2022, 2024, 2025, 2026
Girls Cross Country	1986, 1988, 2020
Girls Gymnastics	1992, 1993, 2002, 2003, 2004, 2005
Girls Soccer	2005
Girls Tennis	1973, 1976, 1977, 1978, 1979, 1980, 1987, 1992, 1993, 1994, 1995, 1996, 2007, 2008, 2009, 2010, 2011, 2012, 2013, 2014
Girls Golf	1984, 1985, 1986, 1987, 1990, 1991, 1993, 2000, 2010, 2011, 2012, 2014, 2015, 2017, 2018, 2019, 2021
Girls Volleyball	1987, 1988, 1989, 2002, 2020, 2021
Baseball	2010, 2012

== Performing arts ==
The school fields one competitive show choir, the mixed-gender "Ovation!". Ovation! won a competition at the Mitchell Corn Palace in 2012. The school hosted the first South Dakota state championship competition in 2016.

== Notable alumni ==
- Dusty Coleman - professional baseball player
- Larry Jacobson - professional football player
- Chad McConnell - professional baseball player
- Tip Reiman - professional football player
- Kevin Truckenmiller - singer
- Thomas Vanek - professional hockey player
