= Paul Vincent Dudley =

American prelate

His Excellency, The Most Reverend Paul Vincent Dudley
- Bishop of Sioux Falls
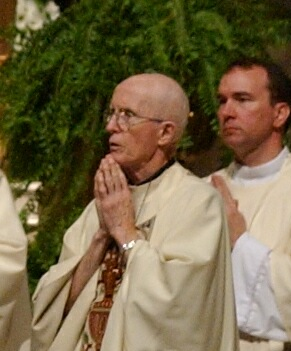
- Dudley in 2004
- Diocese: Diocese of Sioux Falls
- Appointed: November 6, 1978
- Installed: December 13, 1978
- Term ended: March 21, 1995
- Predecessor: Lambert Anthony Hoch
- Successor: Robert James Carlson
- Other posts: Auxiliary Bishop of Saint Paul and Minneapolis & Titular Bishop of Ursona (1977-1978)

Orders
- Ordination: June 2, 1951 by John Gregory Murray
- Consecration: January 25, 1977 by John Roach (bishop), Leo Binz and James Richard Ham

Personal details
- Born: November 29, 1926 Northfield, Minnesota, US
- Died: November 20, 2006 (aged 79) St. Paul, Minnesota, US
- Buried: Calvary Cemetery, Northfield, Minnesota, US
- Education: St. Paul Seminary
- Motto: Adjuva me domine (Help me, Lord)

Paul Vincent Dudley (November 29, 1926 – November 20, 2006) was an American prelate of the Catholic Church. He served as bishop of Sioux Falls in South Dakota from 1978 to 1995. He previously served as an auxiliary bishop of the Archdiocese of Saint Paul and Minneapolis in Minnesota from 1977 to 1978.

== Biography ==
=== Early life ===
Paul Dudley was born on November 29, 1926, in Northfield, Minnesota, the tenth child of Edward Austin and Margaret Ann (née Nolan) Dudley. He studied at Nazareth Hall Preparatory Seminary in Arden Hills, Minnesota, and St. Paul Seminary in St. Paul.

=== Priesthood ===
Dudley was ordained to the priesthood for the Archdiocese of Saint Paul on June 2, 1951, at Cathedral of Saint Paul in St. Paul, Minnesota by Archbishop John Gregory Murray. After his ordination, the archdiocese assigned Dudley as a curate at Annunciation Parish in Minneapolis. He was transferred in 1964 to St. Patrick Parish in St. Paul. Dudley became the founding pastor of St. Edward Parish at Bloomington, Minnesota, in 1967, and pastor of Our Lady of the Lake Church at Mound, Minnesota, in 1972.

=== Auxiliary Bishop of Saint Paul and Minneapolis ===
On November 9, 1976, Dudley was appointed auxiliary bishop of St. Paul and Minneapolis and Titular Bishop of Ursona by Pope Paul VI. He received his episcopal consecration on January 25, 1977, from Archbishop John Roach, with Archbishop Leo Binz and Bishop James Richard Ham, M.M., serving as co-consecrators, at the Basilica of St. Mary. In addition to his episcopal duties, he served as pastor of St. James Church at St. Paul from 1977 to 1978.

=== Bishop of Sioux Falls ===
Following the resignation of Bishop Lambert Anthony Hoch, Dudley was named the sixth bishop of Sioux Falls by Pope John Paul II on November 6, 1978. He was the first U.S. appointment of John Paul II, who had been elected that October. Dudley was later installed on December 13, 1978.

During his tenure in Sioux Falls, Dudley developed several ecumenical ministries serving the poor, and fostered many retreat and spiritual renewal programs. He was active in such anti-abortion organizations as Minnesota Citizens Concerned for Life, Total Life Care, and Prolife Across America. He also served as episcopal moderator for Worldwide Marriage Encounter and for Teens Encounter Christ. He was described as "a holy man" and "a true shepherd."

=== Retirement and legacy ===
After sixteen years, Dudley resigned as bishop of Sioux Falls on March 21, 1995. He retired to the family farm in Northfield, and there served as pastor of St. Dominic Parish (1995–1997).

In 1999, Dudley was accused of sexually abusing two women in the 1960s and 1970s. However, the charges were later dropped due to insufficient evidence. In 2002 he was accused of molesting an 11- or 12-year-old altar boy on four occasions during the 1950s. Following this accusation, he declared, "I totally deny these allegations. They are brutally unfounded." He also decided to withdraw from "any priestly ministry" pending the conclusion of an investigation "due to the great publicity given to priests and bishops accused of sexual abuse." An independent investigator hired by the Archdiocese of Saint Paul and Minneapolis cleared the complaints against Dudley. He stated, "While living under the cloud of these accusations has been one of the greatest challenges of my life, I never lost faith and confidence that the truth would prevail."

Dudley was awarded the Distinguished Alumnus Award by St. Paul Seminary in 2006. He died on November 20, 2006, from pulmonary disease at St. Joseph's Hospital in St. Paul at age 79. He is buried at Calvary Cemetery in Northfield.

Catholic Church titles
| Preceded by Lambert Anthony Hoch | Bishop of Sioux Falls; 1978–1995 | Succeeded by Robert James Carlson |
