= Fischer quintuplets =

First surviving American quintuplets (b. 1963)

The Fischer quintuplets also known as the Fischer quints, were the first surviving quintuplets in the United States. They are Mary Ann (named after their mother), Mary Magdalene, Mary Catherine, James Andrew, and Mary Margaret. The news of the quintuplets' birth garnered world wide attention in 1963 and the family received a parade, money, and even five medals from Pope Paul VI. The parents sold the magazine and television rights to their story and then attempted to give the "quints" an ordinary life.

== Birth ==
They were born at St. Luke's Hospital in Aberdeen, South Dakota, on September 14, 1963, and were placed in incubators because they were "tiny, premature babies, so small that any one of them could be held in a hand". The nurses at St. Lukes Hospital named the babies A, B, C, D and E. It was thought the quintuplets came from three different eggs, leading to two fraternal twins and three triplets.

== Childhood ==
Their parents are Andrew and Mary Ann Fischer, who treated their children normally despite the public treating them as a "rare natural wonder". Catholic Bishop Lambert Anthony Hoch baptized them in 1963. Exactly a month after they were born, a two-hour long parade was held in Aberdeen for the quintuplets with their parents leading the procession. The parade was watched by 50,000 people, including 24,000 from Aberdeen. Five medals from Pope Paul VI were given to the Fischer family during the parade. Due to the publicity, the family received a large sum of money and bought a $100,000 house and an 800-acre (320-hectare) farm. They were raised near Aberdeen, along with their six other siblings. When their daughter Cynthia was born the following year, Mary Ann said that Cindy kept the quintuplets from thinking that they were "the whole show" because much of the family's attention was focused on her.

In 1980 the parents divorced, and the divorce settlement allowed Mrs. Fischer to stay in the customized home with the eleven children until 1985; the home was to be sold at the time with the funds split between Mary Ann and Andrew Fisher. Mary Ann Fisher died in 2012 and Andrew Fisher died in 2015.

== Media ==
John Bird, of The Saturday Evening Post, covered the quintuplets' first summer outside, on their family farm, when they were 22 months old. They were written about in The Saturday Evening Post several times. There was once a sign in Aberdeen that said, "Aberdeen—Home of the Fischer quints".

A 1963 film titled Happy Mother's Day was shown at the Venice Film Festival and Dok Leipzig, winning awards at both of them. The film later aired on European television and was covered in European film journals. However, the film never aired on television in the United States. In Happy Mother's Day, Mary Ann Fischer was shown to be "quietly suffering" because of the publicity. The American television channel ABC showed a heavily cut version of the film, titled The Fischer Quintuplets with negative content being replaced by narration.

When the quintuplets turned five years old they were living in "relative seclusion". After the worldwide publicity, the Fischers decided they wanted their children to have as "ordinary a life as possible." The Fischers signed exclusive contracts with publications which gave them $250,000. By 1976 the quintuplets were 13 years old and their parents still kept the children out of the spotlight. Mary Ann Fischer stated that she wanted the quints to be "ordinary, everyday kids". Their father Andrew Fischer had become a cattle rancher.

The quintuplets turned 50 years old in 2013 and the Associated Press ran a story updating their life history.

== See also ==
- List of multiple births
