= Cathedral of Saint Joseph (Sioux Falls, South Dakota) =

Historic church in South Dakota, United States

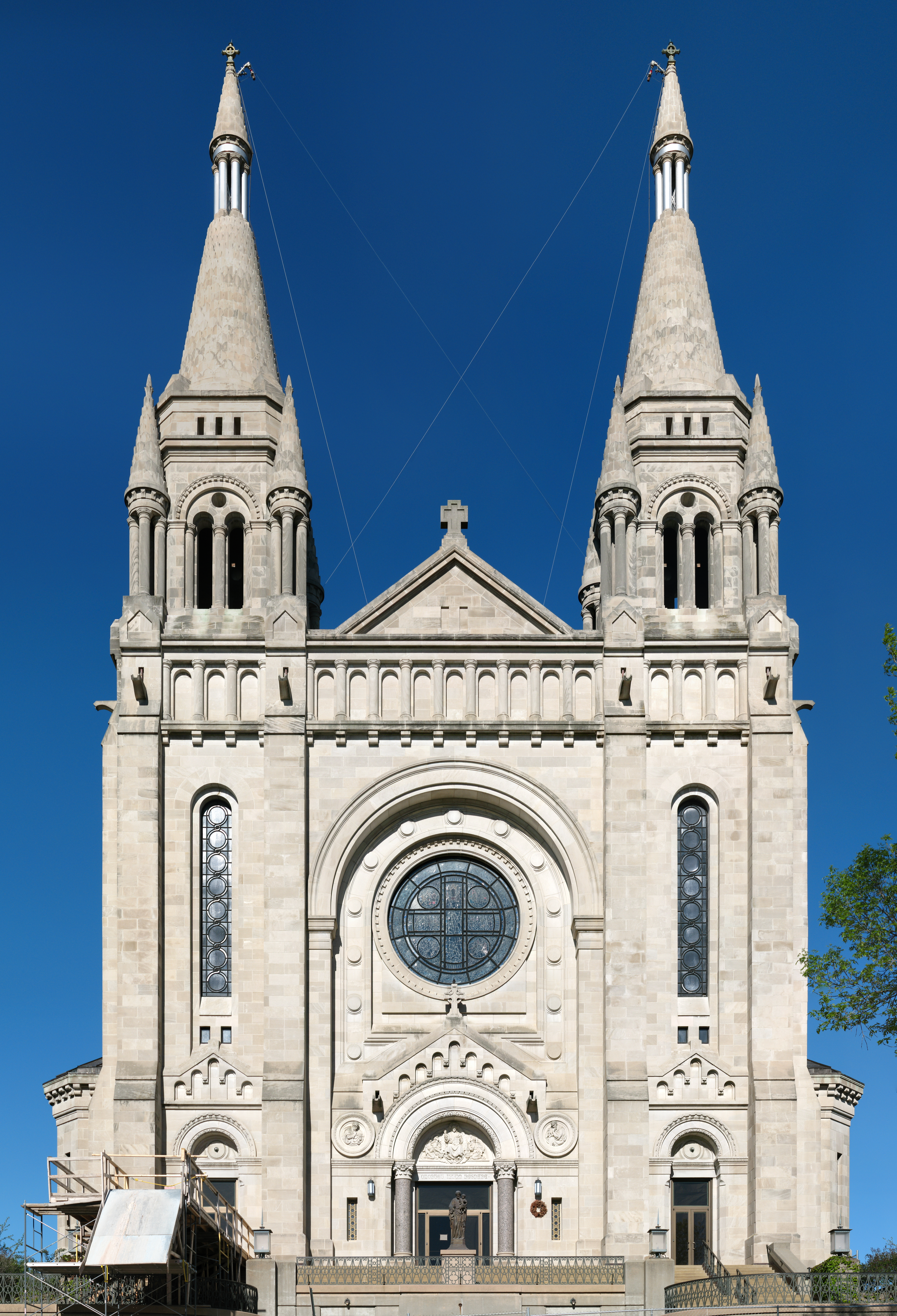

- Location in South Dakota
- 43°33′10″N 96°44′06″W
- Location: 521 N. Duluth Ave. Sioux Falls, South Dakota
- Country: United States
- Denomination: Roman Catholic Church
- Website: www.stjosephcathedral.net

History
- Status: Cathedral/Parish Church
- Founded: 1915
- Dedication: May 7, 1919

Architecture
- Architect: Emmanuel Masqueray
- Style: Renaissance Revival
- Completed: 1919
- Construction cost: $390,000

Specifications
- Materials: Limestone

Administration
- Diocese: Sioux Falls

Clergy
- Bishop: Most Rev. Donald DeGrood
- Rector: Very Rev. James Morgan
- Cathedral of Saint Joseph
- U.S. Historic district – Contributing property
- Part of: Cathedral Historic District (ID74001896)
- Added to NRHP: June 5, 1974

The Cathedral of Saint Joseph is a Catholic cathedral and parish church located in Sioux Falls, South Dakota, in the United States. It is the seat of the Diocese of Sioux Falls. Since 1974 the cathedral has been a contributing property in the Cathedral Historic District on the National Register of Historic Places.

== History ==
=== St. Michael's Church and Cathedral ===
The Cathedral of St. Joseph traces its history to the 1881 establishment of St. Michael's, the first Catholic parish in Sioux Falls. The parish constructed a wooden church, but it burned down later that year. Two years later, the parish replaced it with a larger brick church.

St. Michael's Church became St. Michael's Pro-Cathedral when Bishop Martin Marty, Vicar Apostolic of the Dakota Territory, arrived in Sioux Falls in 1889. On November 12, 1889, Pope Leo XIII established the Diocese of Sioux Falls. At that point St. Michael's become the cathedral for the new diocese.

During the 1910s, Bishop Thomas O'Gorman began planning a new cathedral. He hired the architect Emmanuel Masqueray of New York City. Deciding to used the site of St. Michael, they moved the old cathedral and razed the rectory. Construction of the new cathedral began in 1915. When Masqueray died in May 1917, Edwin Lundie, Masqueray's chief assistant, took over the project. However, after the American entry into World War I in April 1917 caused material shortages, slowed work.

=== Cathedral of St. Joseph ===
The first mass in the unfinished Cathedral of St. Joseph took place on December 8, 1918. It was finally dedicated on May 7, 1919. The final cost was $390,000.

The diocese in 1935 installed a pipe organ manufactured by Kilgen and Son in St. Louis, Missouri. A fire in the lower church did significant damage to the cathedral in 1942. The Conrad Schmitt Studios in Wisconsin redecorated the interior later that year. The marble high altar and tester were installed in 1946. The frosted glass windows were replaced by French stenciled stained glass windows in 1947. A major interior restoration took place between 1970 and 1974. A new free-standing altar was installed at that time. During this restoration, many of the artistic elements in the interior were painted over.

In 2004, the diocese constructed the Sacred Heart Chapel in the sacristy and the lower church was renovated as a parish hall. In 2009, the diocese began another major renovation of the cathedral interior. The peeling plaster was restored and the paint removed from many of the interior surfaces. The diocese commissioned new paintings and sculptures. The contractors updated the HVAC system and completely rewired the building. The project was completed in 2010.

The diocese in 2023 renovated the rectory in 2023. In 2025, a new pipe organ manufactured by the Juget-Sinclair Organbuilders of Montreal, Quebec, was installed. In October 2025, the diocese announced that St. Joseph Classical, a secondary school in the Chesterton Schools Network, would be opening on the cathedral campus.

Cathedral images

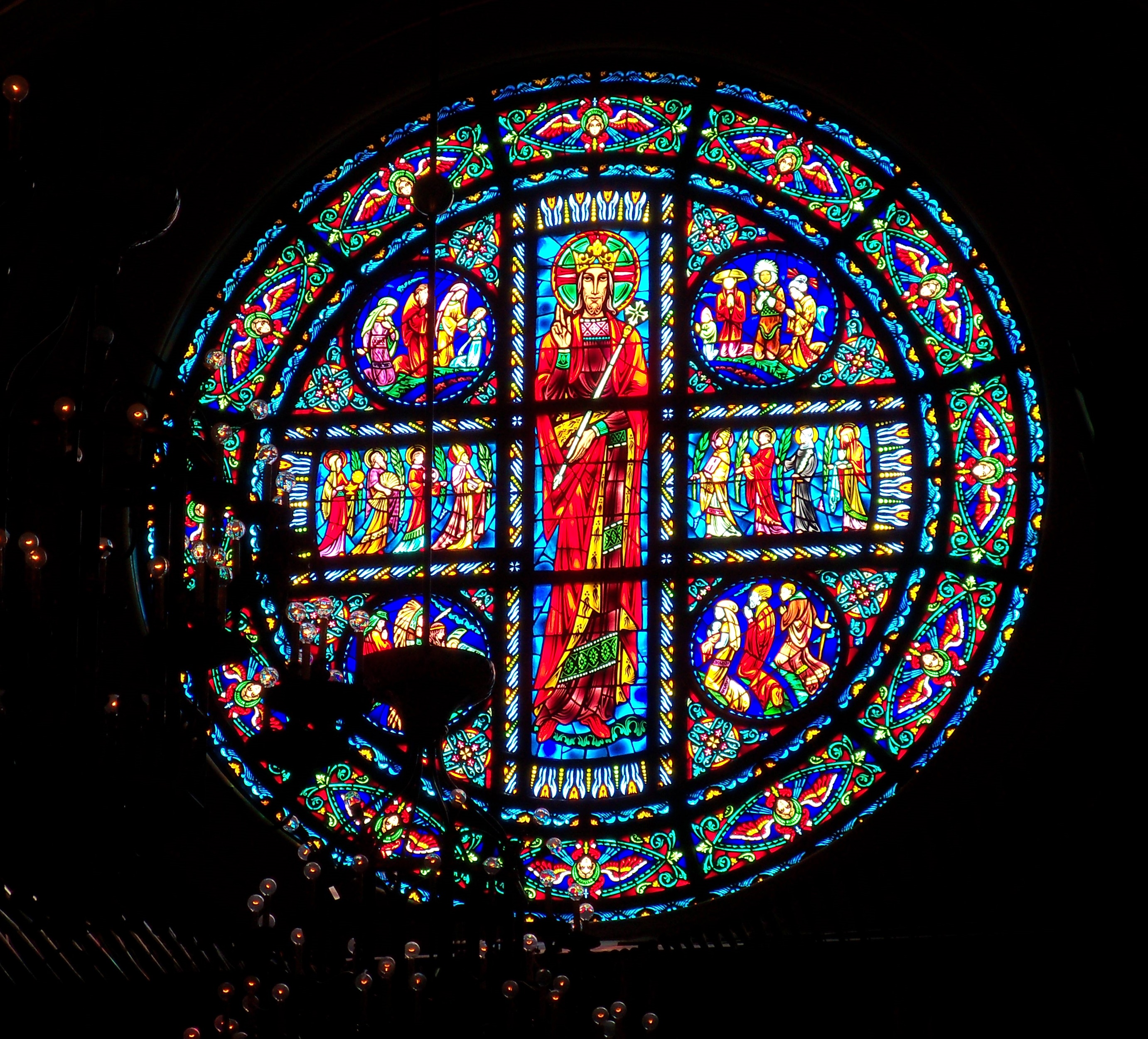
Rose window (2013)

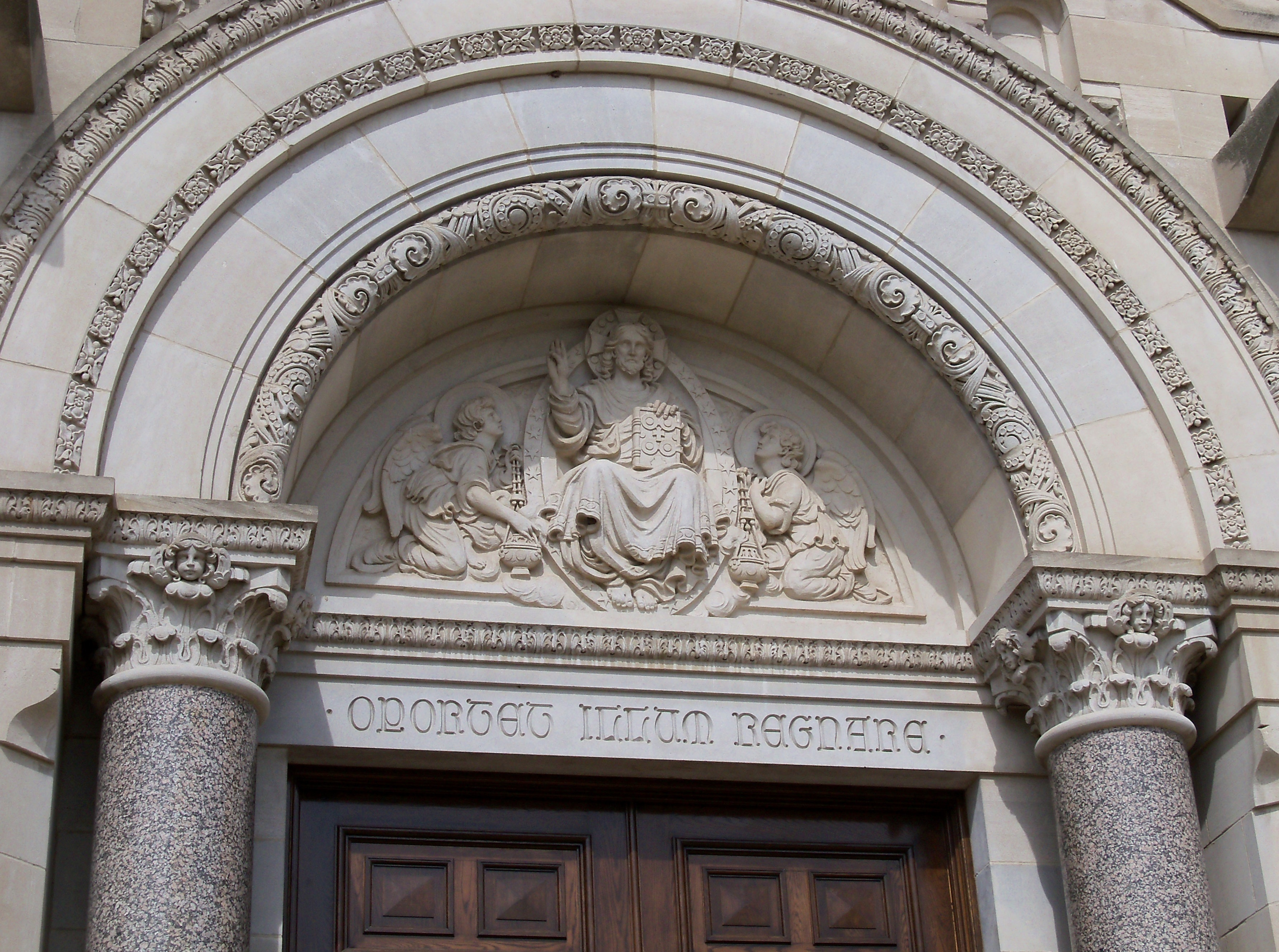
Timpanum (2013)

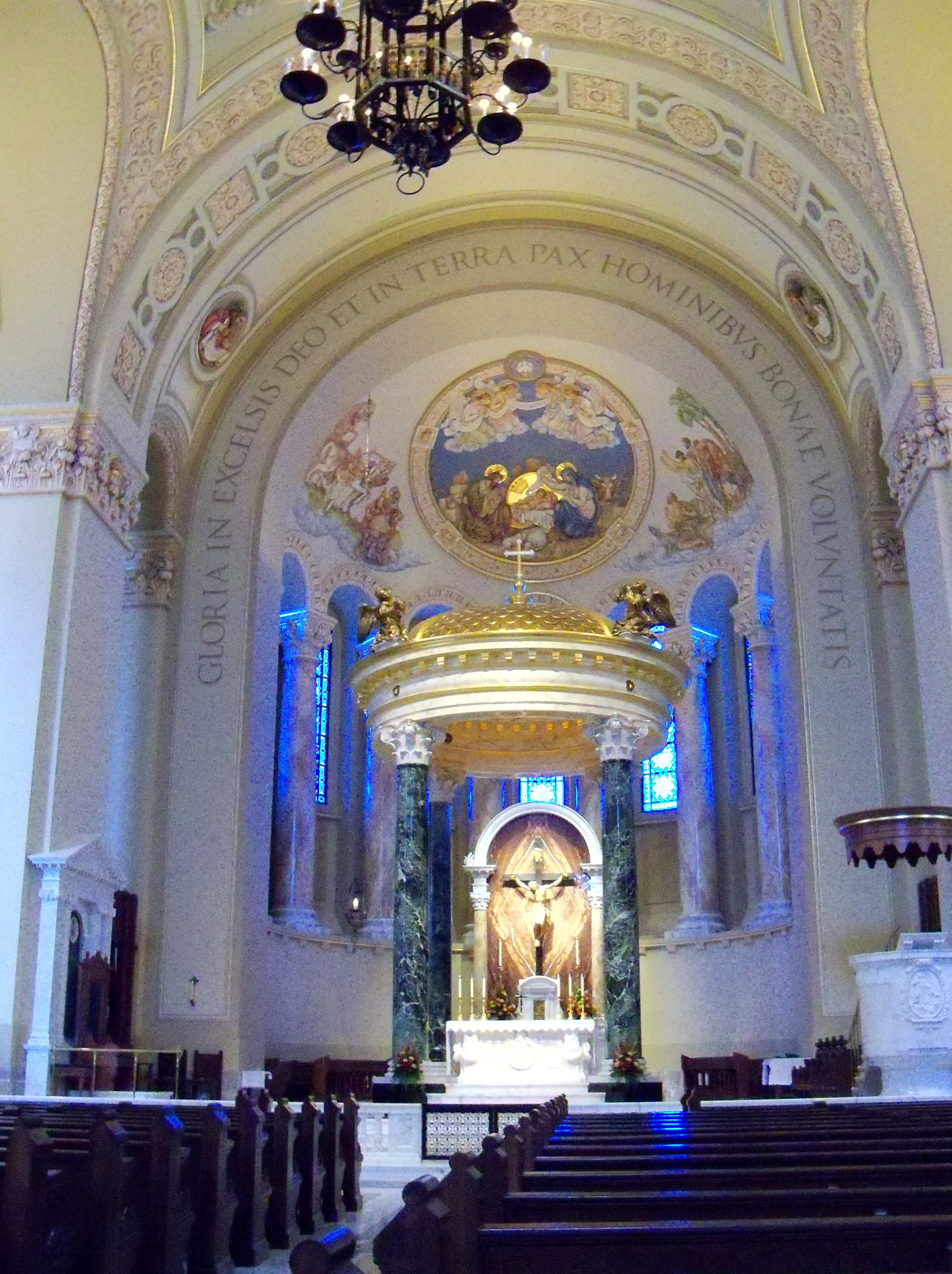
Main altar and apse (2013)

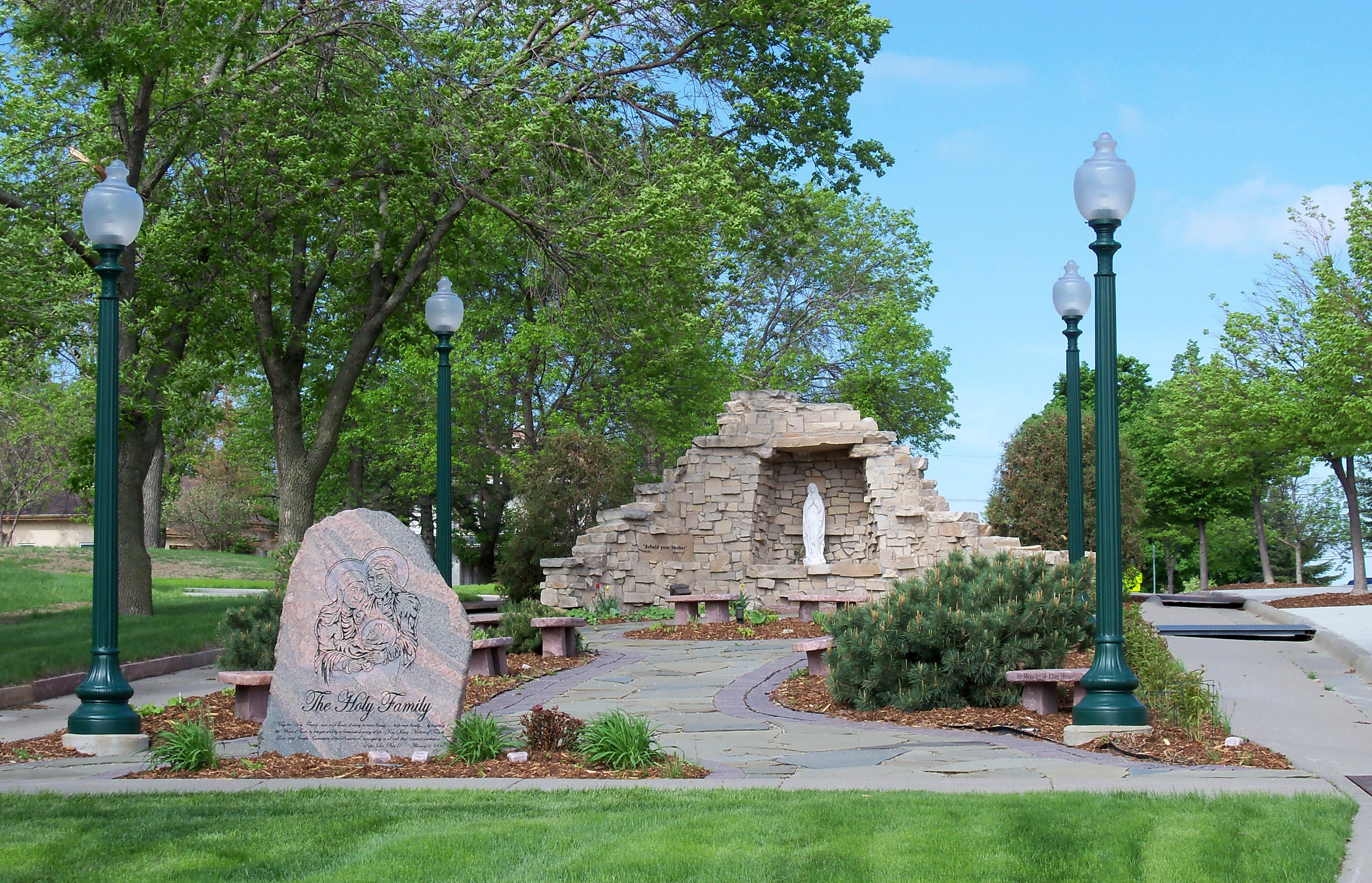
Grotto (2013

== See also ==
- List of Catholic cathedrals in the United States
- List of cathedrals in the United States
