= William O. Brady =

American Roman Catholic Archbishop

His Excellency, The Most Reverend William Otterwell Ignatius Brady
- Archbishop of Saint Paul
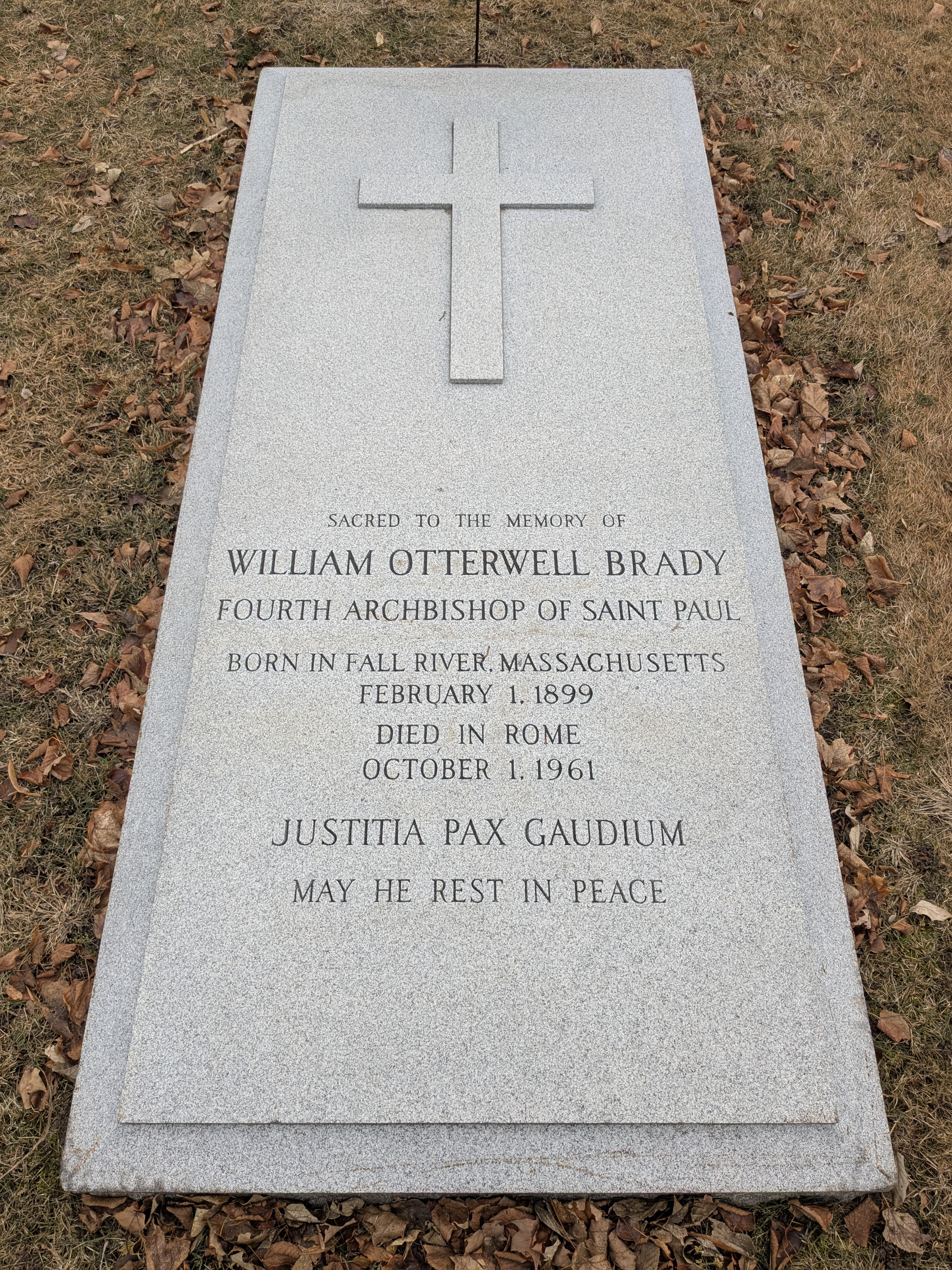
- The grave of Bishop Brady at Resurrection Cemetery in Mendota Heights, Minnesota
- Church: Roman Catholic Church
- In office: October 11, 1956 – October 1, 1961
- Predecessor: John Gregory Murray
- Successor: Leo Binz
- Previous post: Bishop of Sioux Falls

Orders
- Ordination: December 21, 1923 by Daniel Francis Feehan
- Consecration: August 24, 1939 by John Gregory Murray

Personal details
- Born: February 1, 1899 Fall River, Massachusetts, US
- Died: October 1, 1961 (age 62) Rome, Italy
- Buried: Resurrection Cemetery, Mendota Heights, Minnesota
- Education: St. Charles College; St. Mary's Seminary; Catholic University of America
- Motto: Iustitia pax gaudium (Justice peace joy)

William Otterwell Ignatius Brady (February 1, 1899 – October 1, 1961) was an American prelate of the Roman Catholic Church. He served as bishop of Sioux Falls in South Dakota (1939–1956) and archbishop of Saint Paul in Minnesota (1956–1961).

== Biography ==
=== Early life ===
William Brady was born on February 1, 1899, in Fall River, Massachusetts, to John J. and Gladys (née Davol) Brady. He had an older brother Louis and a younger sister Leonora. Brandy attended B.M.C. Durfee High School in Fall River where he was editor of the yearbook during his senior year.

Deciding to become a priest, Brady entered St. Charles College in Catonsville, Maryland in 1916. He continued his studies in 1918 at St. Mary's Seminary in Baltimore, Maryland, then went in 1920 to the Theological College of the Catholic University of America in Washington, D.C. .

=== Priesthood ===
Brady was ordained to the priesthood for the Diocese of Fall River on December 21, 1923, in Fall River, Massachusetts, by Bishop Daniel Francis Feehan. After his ordination, the diocese sent him back to Catholic University, where he received a Bachelor of Sacred Theology degree in 1924. Later that year, he was sent to further his studies in Rome at the Pontifical University of St. Thomas Aquinas. He earned his Doctor of Sacred Theology summa cum laude in 1926.

Brady left Rome in 1926 to become a professor of moral and pastoral theology at Saint Paul Seminary in St. Paul, Minnesota. Brady became rector of Saint Paul in 1933.

=== Bishop of Sioux Falls ===
On June 10, 1939, Pope Pius XII appointed Brady as titular archbishop of Selymbria and bishop of Sioux Falls. He was consecrated on August 24, 1939, by Archbishop John Gregory Murray at the Cathedral of St. Paul in St. Paul, Minnesota.

=== Coadjutor Archbishop and Archbishop of Saint Paul ===
On June 16, 1956, Pope Pius XII appointed Brady as coadjutor archbishop of Saint Paul. Brady succeeded John Gregory Murray as Archbishop of St. Paul upon Murray's death on October 11, 1956.

=== Death and legacy ===
Brady was appointed a consulter to the Pontifical Commission of Bishops and the Government of Dioceses for the Second Vatican Council. On September 21, 1961, he left Minnesota to travel to the Vatican to attend a preparatory meeting of the Pontifical Commission. While flying to Rome from Paris on September 23, he was stricken with coronary thrombosis. After arriving in Rome, he checked into the Salvator Mundi International Hospital in Rome, where he had been driven. After suffering four heart attacks, Brady died at the hospital on October 1, 1961.

After a first funeral mass at the Church of Santa Susanna in Rome, Brady's body was flown back to St. Paul on October 7 to the Cathedral of St. Paul. During the two-day vigil, mourners waited in lines that stretched outside the cathedral and down the front steps. The main funeral mass was celebrated on October 9 at the cathedral The principal celebrant was Archbishop Leo Binz

- Archbishop Brady High School in West Saint Paul, Minnesota, was named after him.
- Brady Hall and the Brady Educational Center at the University of Saint Thomas are named after him
- The St. William's Care Center in Milbank, South Dakota, was named in his honor.

Catholic Church titles
Preceded by John Murray	Archbishop of St. Paul; 1956–1961	Succeeded by Leo Binz
