= John Gregory Murray =

American prelate

His Excellency, The Most Reverend John Gregory Murray
- Archbishop of Saint Paul; Titular bishop of Flavias
- See: Saint Paul
- Installed: January 27, 1932
- Term ended: October 10, 1956
- Predecessor: Austin Dowling
- Successor: William O. Brady
- Other posts: Auxiliary Bishop of Hartford (1920–1925); Bishop of Portland (1925–1932)

Orders
- Ordination: April 14, 1900 by Josephus van der Stappen
- Consecration: April 28, 1920 by Giovanni Bonzano

Personal details
- Born: February 26, 1877 Waterbury, Connecticut, US
- Died: October 11, 1956 (aged 79) Saint Paul, Minnesota, US
- Denomination: Roman Catholic Church
- Education: College of the Holy Cross (BA); University of Louvain
- Motto: Mea omnia tua (My everything is yours)

John Gregory Murray (February 26, 1877 – October 11, 1956) was an American Catholic prelate who served as archbishop of Saint Paul in Minnesota from 1931 until his death in 1956. He previously served as an auxiliary bishop of the Diocese of Hartford in Connecticut from 1920 to 1925 and as bishop of Portland in Maine from 1925 to 1932.

== Biography ==
=== Early life ===
John G. Murray was born on February 26, 1877, in Waterbury, Connecticut, to William and Mary Ellen (née Connor) Murray. His parents were both Irish immigrants; his William was from Carrickmacross, County Monaghan, and Mary Ellen was from Maryborough, County Leix (present-day Portlaoise, County Laois). One of his brothers, James, was a prominent lawyer in New York City. John Murray worked as a paperboy in his youth. He received his early education at Waterbury Public Schools and graduated from high school in 1895.

Murray attended the College of the Holy Cross in Worcester, Massachusetts, graduating in 1897 with the highest honors ever bestowed upon a student until that time. He continued his studies at the University of Louvain in Leuven, Belgium.

=== Priesthood ===
While in Leuven, Murray was ordained to the priesthood by Bishop Josephus van der Stappen for the Diocese of Hartford on April 14, 1900. His first assignments, following his return to Connecticut, were as chaplain at the Hartford County Jail and as professor of Greek and Latin at St. Thomas Preparatory Seminary in Hartford, Connecticut. He became chancellor of the diocese in 1903.

=== Diocese of Hartford ===
On November 15, 1919, Murray was appointed auxiliary bishop of the Diocese of Hartford and titular bishop of Flavias by Pope Benedict XV. He received his episcopal consecration on April 28, 1920, from Archbishop Giovanni Bonzano, with Bishops John Joseph Nilan and Thomas Joseph Shahan serving as co-consecrators. Murray selected as his episcopal motto: Mea Omnia Tua (Latin: "My Everything is Yours").

Murray was the first native of Connecticut to become a Catholic bishop, and the first auxiliary bishop of the Diocese of Hartford. In addition to his episcopal duties, he was named pastor of St. Patrick's Parish in Hartford in 1922.

=== Diocese of Portland ===
Following the death of Bishop Louis Walsh, Murray was appointed the fifth bishop of Portland by Pope Pius XI on May 29, 1925. His installation took place at the Cathedral of the Immaculate Conception in Portland, Maine, on October 12, 1925. During his five-year tenure in Portland, Murray established thirty new parishes and dedicated himself to Catholic education. He also founded a diocesan weekly newspaper, Church World, in 1930.

During the Great Depression of the 1930s, Murray organized relief committees to raise money for the homeless and unemployed families. He was required to obtain loans and to mortgage church property to continue funding hospitals, orphanages, and other institutions. Consequently, the diocese accumulated millions of dollars in debt.

=== Archdiocese of Saint Paul ===
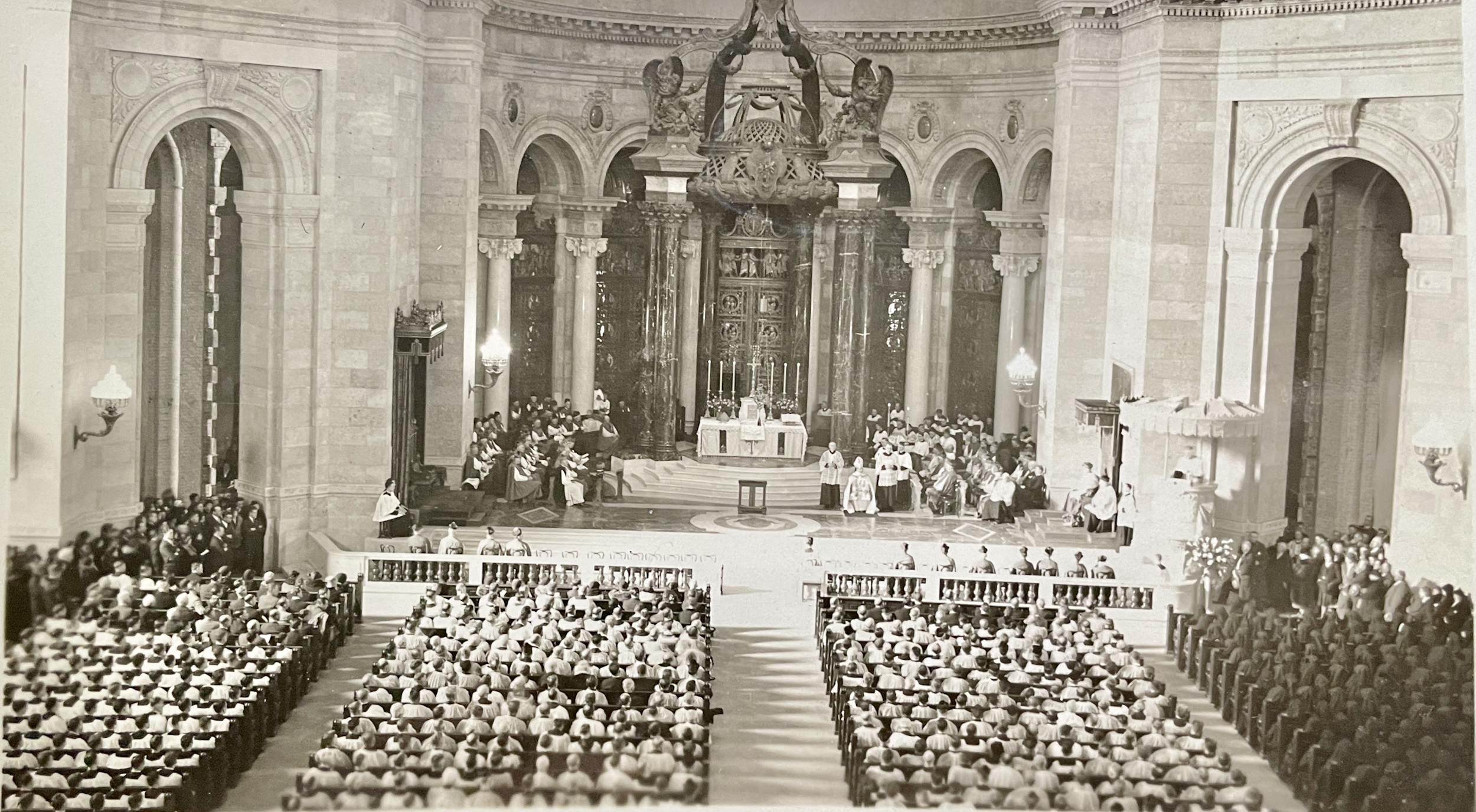
Installation of Archbishop Murray in Saint Paul, Minnesota (1932)

Murray was appointed by Pius XI as the third archbishop of Saint Paul on October 29, 1931. He was installed at the Cathedral of Saint Paul in St. Paul on January 27, 1932. To address the continuing effects of the Great Depression, Murray began a crusade of charity to support the poor and unemployed, and made himself available to the public by taking public transit and walking in the downtown areas.

During his 24-year tenure, Murray established over 50 new parishes, eliminated debt at the College of St. Thomas, and constructed a science hall, gymnasium, and a new seminary library. He also began a radio show on WCCO called Church of the Air, established the Confraternity of Christian Doctrine, the Family Guild, and mandated liturgical reform in the archdiocese. In 1941, the national Eucharistic Congress was held at Saint Paul, an event which many considered a testament to Murray's influence. In 1949, he ordered Catholic parents to not allow their children to receive sex education in public or private schools. He also served as a member of the administrative board of the National Catholic Welfare Council.

John Murray died of cancer in St. Paul on October 11, 1956, at age 79. He is interred at Resurrection Cemetery in Mendota Heights, Minnesota.

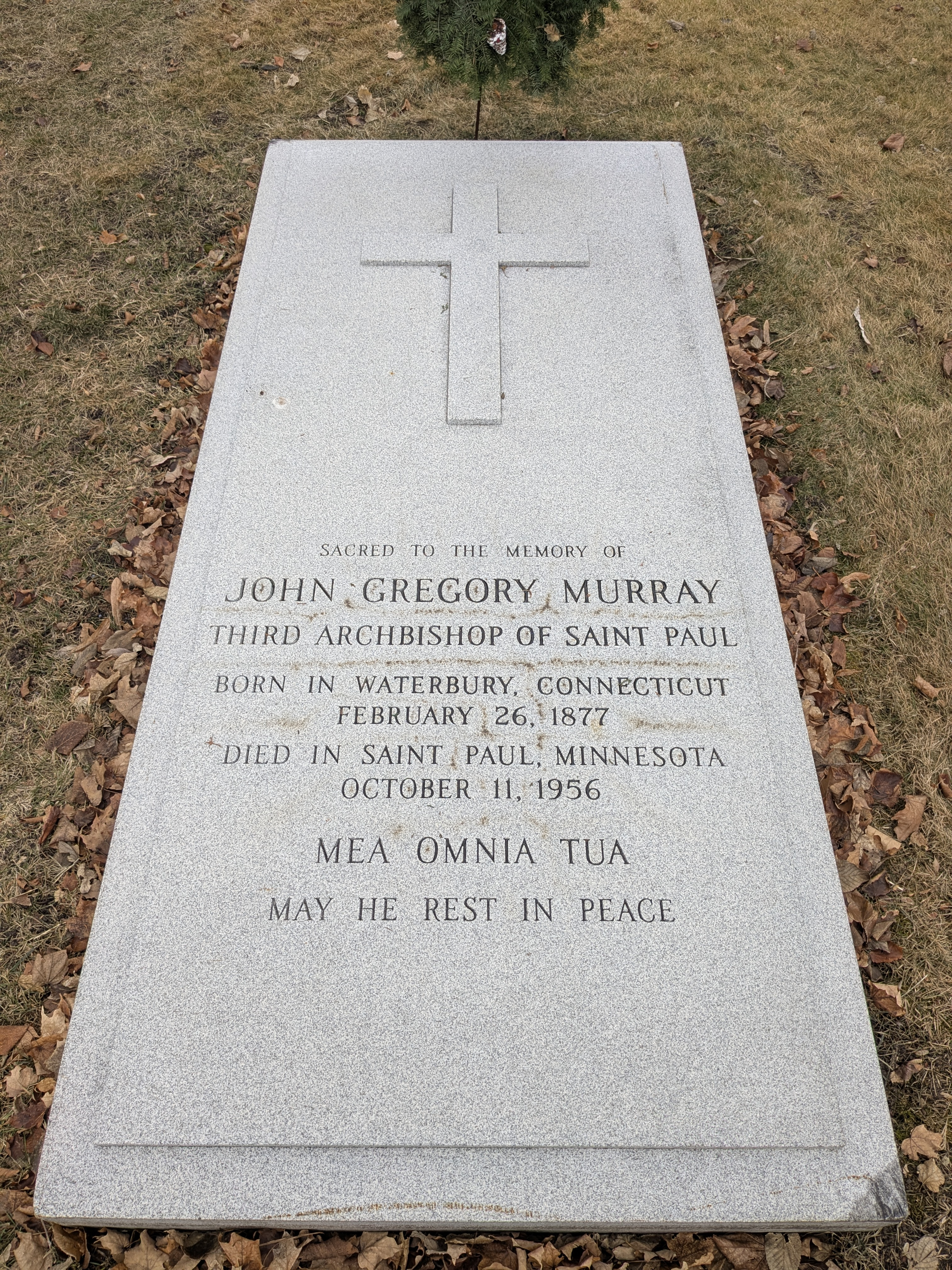
Grave of Archbishop Murray, Resurrection Cemetery, Mendota Heights, Minnesota (2024)

Catholic Church titles
Preceded by Austin Dowling	Archbishop of Saint Paul; 1931–1956	Succeeded by William O. Brady
Preceded by Louis Sebastian Walsh	Bishop of Portland; 1925–1931	Succeeded by Joseph Edward McCarthy
Preceded by Joseph Francis Donnelly	Auxiliary Bishop of Hartford; 1920–1925	Succeeded by Paul S. Loverde
