= Columbus College (South Dakota) =

Catholic college in Sioux Falls, South Dakota, US (1909–1929)

Columbus College was a private Catholic college that operated in South Dakota from 1909 (117 years ago) to 1929 (97 years ago). Founded by Bishop O'Gorman of the Catholic diocese of Sioux Falls, South Dakota, the school opened in 1909 in Chamberlain, South Dakota. The facility, a former Indian boarding school, was transferred by the federal government to the Catholic Church for "college purposes".

It operated as an all-male prep school, high school, and college, the only Catholic college for men in South Dakota. In 1921, Columbus College was relocated to a new facility in Sioux Falls. The athletic teams at Columbus were known as the Mariners and competed in the South Dakota Intercollegiate Conference. In August 1929, Columbus College announced that it was closing because of financial difficulties. Agriculture had suffered and banks had to reserve their resources.

The facility and land of the former school and college in Chamberlain were vacant after the college left. In 1927 the complex was purchased by Priests of the Sacred Heart to establish St. Joseph's Indian School, for students K-8. Based in Wisconsin, the order established a mission at the Cheyenne River Reservation and assigned numerous priests to South Dakota. This school is still operating as of 2021 and has 221 students. Some high school-age students also live here and attend the public high school in Chamberlain, South Dakota.
