= Dennis Dease =

American university president

- Born: Dennis Dease; May 12, 1943 (age 83)
- Education: The Saint Paul Seminary School of Divinity (B.A., M.Div.); University of St. Thomas (M.A.); Catholic University of America (Ph.D.)
- Occupations: Priest, former university president

The Rev. Dennis Dease is a Roman Catholic priest, who served as the 14th president of the University of St. Thomas in Minnesota from his election in 1991 to 2013.

== Biography ==
Father Dease earned a B.A. degree in Latin and philosophy from The Saint Paul Seminary in 1965, an M.A. degree in counseling psychology from the University of St. Thomas in 1972, a M.Div. degree from The Saint Paul Seminary in 1973, and a Ph.D. degree in systematic theology from the Catholic University of America in 1978. He was ordained a priest in 1969.

He was associate pastor at the Church of St. John the Evangelist in Hopkins, Minnesota, taught theology at the University of St. Thomas and served as spiritual director and dean of formation at The Saint Paul Seminary. From 1985 to 1991, he was rector of the Basilica of Saint Mary in Minneapolis. He is a tenured faculty member at The Saint Paul Seminary.

Father Dease, who is a priest of the Archdiocese of Saint Paul and Minneapolis, was one of 54 applicants for the University of St. Thomas presidency. Of the four finalists, two were not from the local archdiocese. During Father Dease's presidency, St. Thomas under his leadership continued its growth in programs and facilities, adding six major buildings to its St. Paul campus and establishing a Minneapolis campus of four buildings for its Opus College of Business, Schulze School of Entrepreneurship, School of Education, Graduate School of Professional Psychology and School of Law. He also established nationally recognized Centers for Catholic Studies and Irish Studies. He opened a residential campus in Rome and semester-abroad programs in Rome for Catholic Studies majors, in London for business majors, in Paris for liberal arts majors and in Glasgow for English majors. In addition, he has established several faculty and student exchange programs with universities throughout the world, including a covenant with the University of Havana in 2000 which was celebrated by a series of baseball games played both in Havana and in the Twin Cities.

Father Dease has served on numerous boards and committees, including the Association of Catholic Colleges and Universities, the Minnesota Private College Council, Research Foundation and Fund, and The Catholic Digest, all three of which he has chaired. He also has been a board member of the National Catholic Education Association, has served on the Priestly Life and Ministry, Domestic Policy and Education Committees of the United States Conference of Catholic Bishops (USCCB), and serves as a consultant to the USCCB's Committee on International Justice and Peace. He also served as the American representative on the International Federation of Catholic Universities board and on the Policy Analysis and Public Relations Committee of the National Association of Independent Colleges and Universities board.

He is active philanthropically in Armenia, serving on the board of directors of the Cafesjian Family Foundation, and in Uganda, where he founded and chairs the Board of Directors of Hope Medical Clinics (HMC), headquartered in Kampala. HMC consists of two clinics and a hospital.

He serves on the boards of Packaging Incorporated and Premier Banks in the Twin Cities, and formerly served on boards of Allianz Life Insurance Company of North America and the former American National Bank of St. Paul. Father Dease served as a founding member of the board of directors of Southern Catholic College in Georgia from 2001 until its closing in 2010 due to lack of funding. He has served on the board of trustees of St. Thomas since 1982.

On Oct. 6, 2008, Father Dease received the National Catholic Educational Association’s highest honor—the St. Elizabeth Ann Seton Award—in recognition of his lifelong work as a Catholic educator.

Father Dease retired as St. Thomas president on June 30, 2013. He was succeeded by Dr. Julie Sullivan on July 1, 2013. Prior to her election to the presidency of St. Thomas, Dr. Sullivan had served as executive vice president and provost of the University of San Diego. She is the first woman and first lay person to serve as St. Thomas president.

Honorary doctorates:

- Doctor of Humane Letters Degree, 2013, St. Catherine University.
- Doctor of Humane Letters Degree, 2013, St. John's University.
- Doctor of Humane Letters Degree, 2013, University of St. Thomas.

Awards:

- Society of the Arches Socius Fidelissimus Award for Contributions of Time and Talent to the University Community, University of St. Thomas Alumni Association.
- Distinguished Alumnus Award, 2013, University of St. Thomas Alumni Association.
- Justitia et Lex Award, 2013, University of St. Thomas School of Law.
- Dean's Medal of Excellence, 2013, University of St. Thomas Opus College of Business.
- ELS International Pathways Award for Lifetime Contribution to International Education, 2013, ELS Educational Services.
- Opus Sancti Thomae Award, 2013, Saint Thomas Academy.
- Legacy of Leadership Award, 2013, Saint Paul Chamber of Commerce.
- Honorary Membership in Recognition of Professional Achievement, 2013, Beta Gamma Sigma, University of St. Thomas-Minnesota Chapter.
- Recognition Award for Contributions to the People of Uganda, 2010 Ugandan North American Association (UNAA) Convention & Trade Expo.
- For Delivering Keynote Address to the DICOTA Convention 2010 and Unmeasurable Contribution to the Tanzanian Community Diaspora Council of Tanzanians in America.
- Partner in Hope Award, 2009, Hope for the city.
- Elizabeth Ann Seton Award, 2008, National Catholic Education Association.
- Recognition for Outstanding Dedication, Commitment and Leadership, 2008, The Royal Embassy of Saudi Arabia and the Saudi Arabian Cultural Mission.
- Pope John XXIII Award, 2004, Viterbo University.
- Certificate of Appreciation: “Recognition for encouragement of the next generation of business owners,” 2003, Saint Louis University.
- “Good Neighbor Award,” 1991, WCCO Radio.
- Harriet P. Burns Award, 1990, College of St. Thomas Faculty of Professional Psychology.
- Knight of the Equestrian Order of the Holy Sepulchre of Jerusalem, 1987.
