= Julie Sullivan =

American academic administrator, accounting/taxation scholar (born 1957)

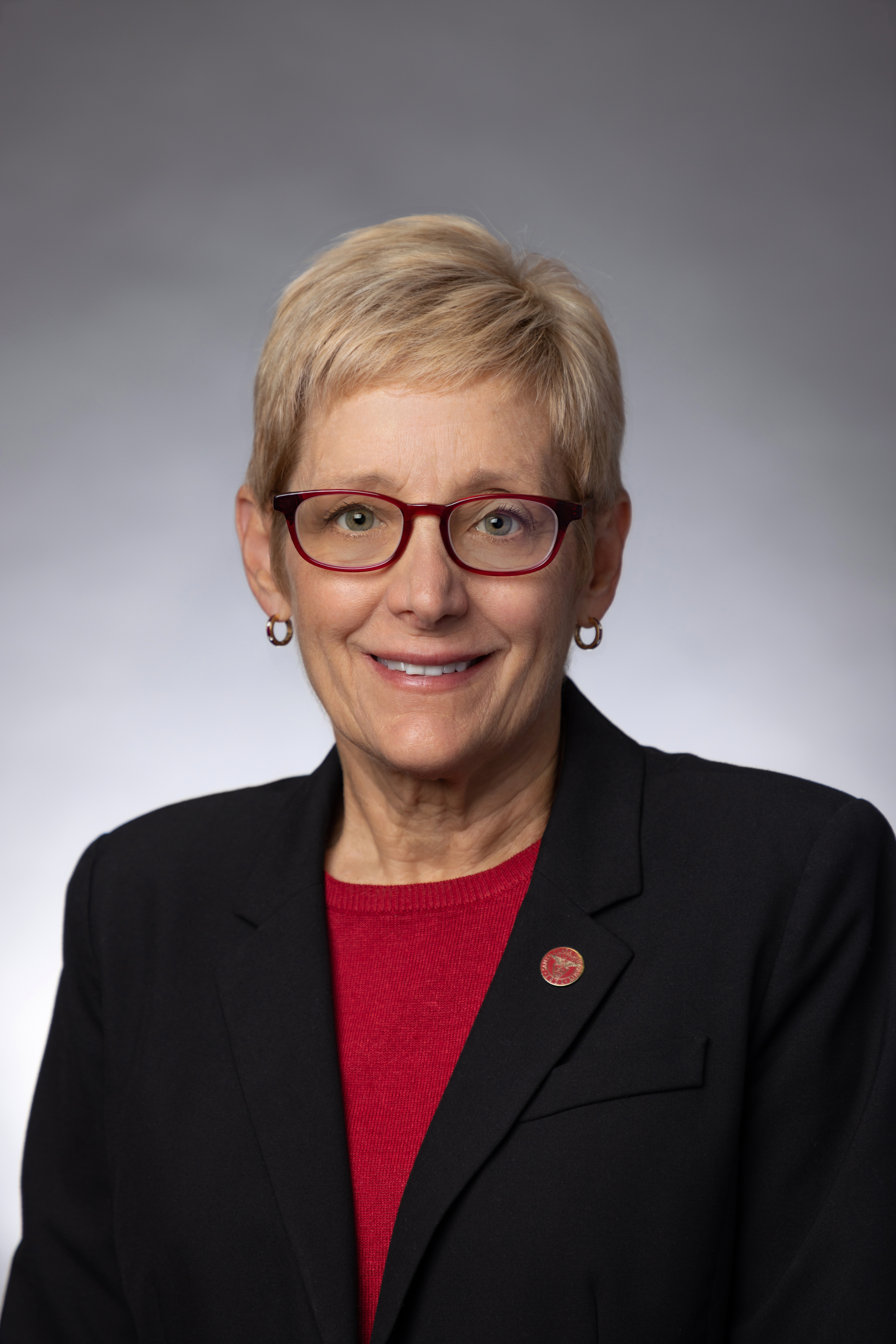

30th President of Santa Clara University
- Incumbent
- Assumed office 2022
- Preceded by: Lisa A. Kloppenberg (acting)

15th President of the University of St. Thomas
- In office 2013–2022
- Succeeded by: Rob Vischer

Personal details
- Born: July 27, 1957 (age 69) Gainesville, Florida, U.S.
- Education: University of Florida (BS, MS, PhD)

Julie Sullivan (formerly known as Julie Collins) is an American academic administrator currently serving as the 30th president of Santa Clara University, a private Jesuit, Catholic institution in Santa Clara, California. Sullivan is the first woman and layperson to be appointed president at Santa Clara University, since its founding in 1851.

== Early life and education ==
A native of Florida, Sullivan attended the University of Florida as a first-generation student where she earned a bachelor's degree in accounting, a master's degree in taxation, and a PhD in business. After college, Sullivan went into higher education, spending four years teaching at the University of Oklahoma before heading to the University of North Carolina at Chapel Hill, where she was a professor in the accounting department for 17 years.

== Career ==
While at UNC, Sullivan was appointed as the Ernst & Young Distinguished Professor and served as the associate dean of the Master's of Accounting program and as senior associate dean of the Kenan-Flagler Business School. In 2003, Sullivan left UNC for the University of California, San Diego where she served as a full professor in the Rady School of Management and School of Global Policy & Strategy for two years before becoming the executive vice president and provost at the University of San Diego, a private Catholic university and serving for eight years. It was announced on March 1, 2022, that Sullivan had accepted an offer to become the president of Santa Clara University, beginning in Fall 2022.

Sullivan is chair of the board of the Association of Catholic Colleges and Universities (ACCU) and serves on the boards of the Association of Jesuit Colleges and Universities (AJCU) and Loyola University Chicago. In addition, she has 19 cumulative years of public company board service and 15 years of private company board service, spanning a number of industries. She is a (non-practicing) Certified Public Accountant.

=== President of University of St. Thomas ===
On February 14, 2013, Sullivan was named the 15th president of University of St. Thomas, a private Roman Catholic institution in St. Paul, Minnesota. As the successor of the Reverend Dennis Dease, Sullivan was the first woman and lay person to hold the title of president in St. Thomas history. In nine years at St. Thomas, President Sullivan launched the Dougherty Family College as a pathway toward a bachelor's degree for underserved students, raised more than $100 million in new scholarships, and completed the university's transition from Division III to Division I athletics. She also established a new School of Nursing and the Morrison Family College of Health, which prioritizes culturally responsive health practices and sustainable approaches in the field.

=== President of Santa Clara University ===
On March 1, 2022, it was announced that Sullivan accepted an offer to become the president of Santa Clara University, beginning in July 2022. She is the first woman and first lay president to serve as president of the private Jesuit, Catholic university.
