= Lake Johanna =

Lake Johanna may refer to:

- Lake Johanna (Ramsey County, Minnesota)
- Lake Johanna Township, Pope County, Minnesota
