= Rob Vischer =

University President

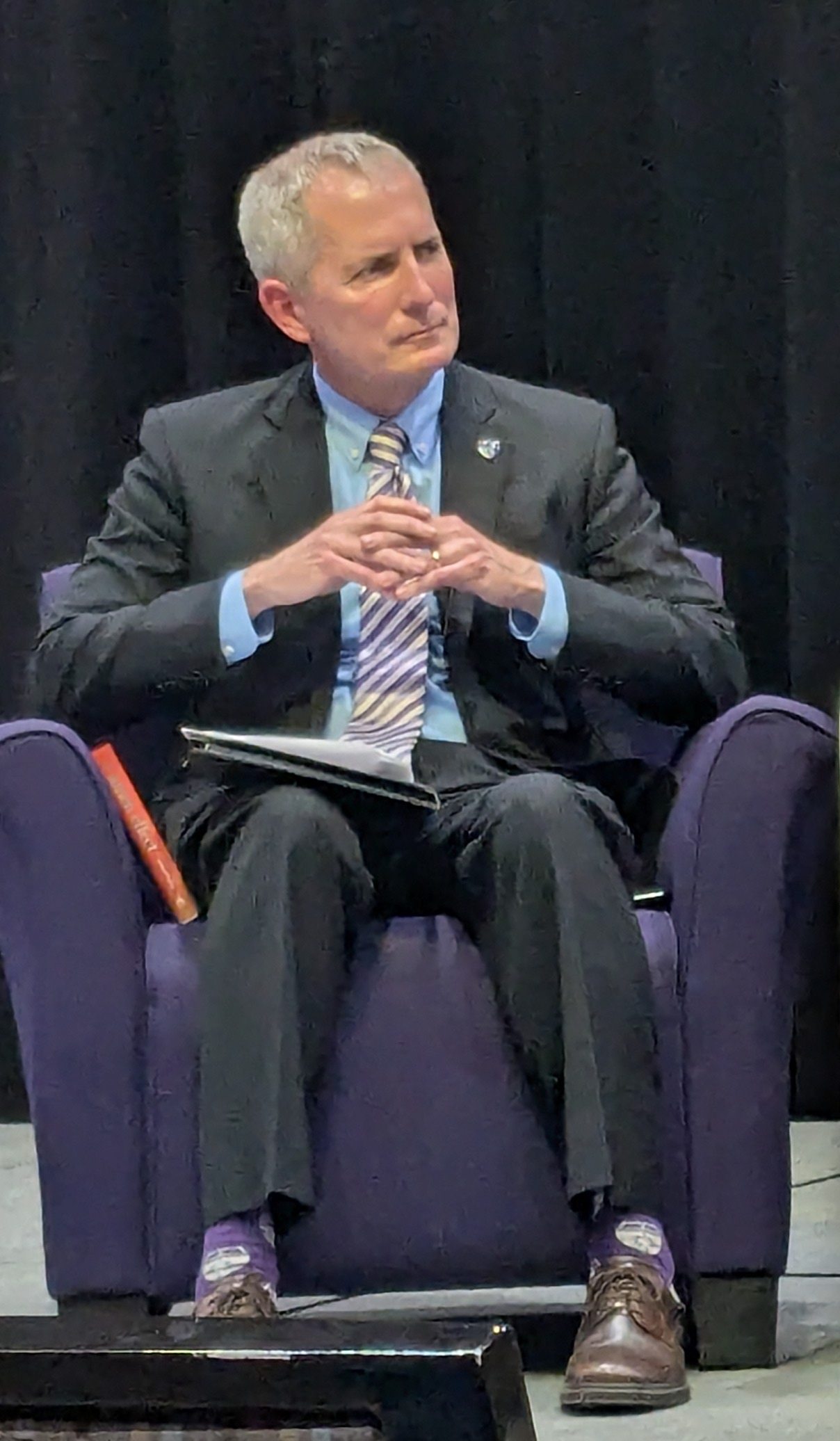
- Rob Vischer in 2025

16th President of the University of St. Thomas
- Incumbent
- Assumed office January 1, 2023; Interim: June 1, 2022, to January 1, 2023
- Preceded by: Julie Sullivan

Dean of the University of St. Thomas School of Law
- In office January 1, 2013 – May 31, 2022
- Preceded by: Thomas Mengler (Note: Neil Hamilton served as Interim Dean from June 1, 2012, until Vischer was selected and assumed the role on January 1, 2013)
- Succeeded by: Joel A. Nichols (Interim) (Note: Served from June 1, 2022, to June 1, 2024): Daniel B. Kelly

Personal details
- Born: Robert K. Vischer; 1970 (age 55–56) Muscatine, Iowa
- Spouse: Maureen Keller (m. 1997)
- Children: 3
- Relatives: Phil Vischer (brother)
- Education: University of New Orleans (BA); Harvard University (JD)

Robert K. Vischer is an American academic administrator and lawyer currently serving as president of the University of St. Thomas. He was previously dean of the University of St. Thomas School of Law from 2013 to 2022.

== Early life and education ==
Vischer was born in Muscatine, Iowa, and moved to the suburbs of Chicago when he was ten years old. His older brother is Phil Vischer, the creator of the VeggieTales animated Christian TV show and films. As a teen, he was in a band with his brothers called the "Raging Melons".

Vischer attended the University of New Orleans, where he graduated with a Bachelor of Arts with highest honors in 1993. He then received a Juris Doctor with honors in 1996 from Harvard Law School, where he served as an editor of Harvard Law Review.

== Career ==
After law school, Vischer clerked for Judge Joan B. Gottschall from 1999 to 2000 and Judge David M. Ebel from 2001 to 2002. In the private sector, he worked as an associate at Kirkland & Ellis for several years. In 2002, he became an assistant professor of law at St. John's University School of Law in New York.

In 2005, he joined the faculty at the University of St. Thomas School of Law in Minnesota. Vischer was named Dean of the Law School in 2013 after Dean Thomas Mengler left to become the President at St. Mary's University in San Antonio, Texas. Vischer served as Dean of the Law School until 2022. The university's board of trustees selected Vischer to become interim president on June 1, 2022, after the departure of then-president Julie Sullivan, who left to become the president of Santa Clara University. After a national search, the board selected Vischer as the university's 16th president in 2023.

In September 2025, Vischer was named Twin Cities Business' 2025 Person of the Year.

== Personal life ==
Vischer married his wife Maureen Keller in 1997 and together they have three daughters.
