= Joseph C. Taphorn =

American Catholic priest (born 1971)

Very Reverend Joseph C. Taphorn JCL
- Rector of the Saint Paul Seminary
- Other posts: Chancellor of the Archdiocese of Omaha, Catholic Chaplain of the University of Nebraska Omaha

Orders
- Ordination: June 7, 1997 by Elden Francis Curtiss

Personal details
- Born: July 6, 1971 (age 54) Omaha, Nebraska
- Denomination: Roman Catholic
- Parents: Jim and Joan Taphorn
- Education: Pontifical Gregorian University (JCL), Pontifical College Josephinum (M.Div, MAT), Benedictine College (BA)

Joseph C. Taphorn, JCL, (born July 6, 1971) is a Roman Catholic priest of the Archdiocese of Omaha, rector of the Saint Paul Seminary School of Divinity, and vice-president of the University of St. Thomas (Minnesota).

== Early life and education ==
Taphorn was born in Omaha, Nebraska, on July 6, 1971, to Catholic parents, Jim and Joan Taphorn. He attended Creighton Preparatory School in Omaha for high school and while he applied to and was accepted at the University of Notre Dame, he chose instead to attend Benedictine College in Atchison, Kansas. There, he studied philosophy and Spanish While studying there, he met and became friends with Andrew H. Cozzens, who would go on to become a priest and bishop. During his college years he was arrested several times for blocking access to a local abortion clinic. After graduation in 1992, he entered seminary at the Pontifical College Josephinum in Columbus, Ohio, and was ordained a priest on June 7, 1997.

== Priestly ministry ==
After ordination, Taphorn served as an associate pastor at Sacred Heart Parish in Norfolk, Nebraska, for three years from 1997 to 2000. In 2000 he was sent to the Pontifical Gregorian University to study canon law, and he received his licentiate in canon law (JCL) in 2002. From 2002 to 2017, he served in a variety of roles in the diocesan chancery and tribunal, including vice-chancellor, chancellor, judicial vicar, and moderator for the curia. In 2016, he became the founding pastor of the Newman Center at the University of Nebraska Omaha, where he remained until December 2018. In June 2018, it was announced that he would become the 15th rector of the Saint Paul Seminary in St. Paul, MN. His term at the Newman Center ended December 31, 2018, and he began at the Saint Paul Seminary on January 1, 2019. He was formally installed on February 11, 2019.
