= DGI =

DGI may refer to:

== Government ==
- Dirección General de Ingresos or Dirección General Impositiva, Latin American tax authorities
- General Intelligence Directorate, Jordanian intelligence agency
- Dirección General de Inteligencia, former name of the Cuban Intelligence Directorate
- fr:Direction générale des Impôts, French tax authority
- Directorate General of Taxes, Moroccan tax authority

== Other uses ==
- Danske Gymnastik- & Idrætsforeninger, a Danish association of sports clubs
- Disciplined Growth Investors
- Disseminated Gonococcal Infection
