= Saint Paul Seminary =

Catholic seminary in St. Paul, Minnesota, U.S.

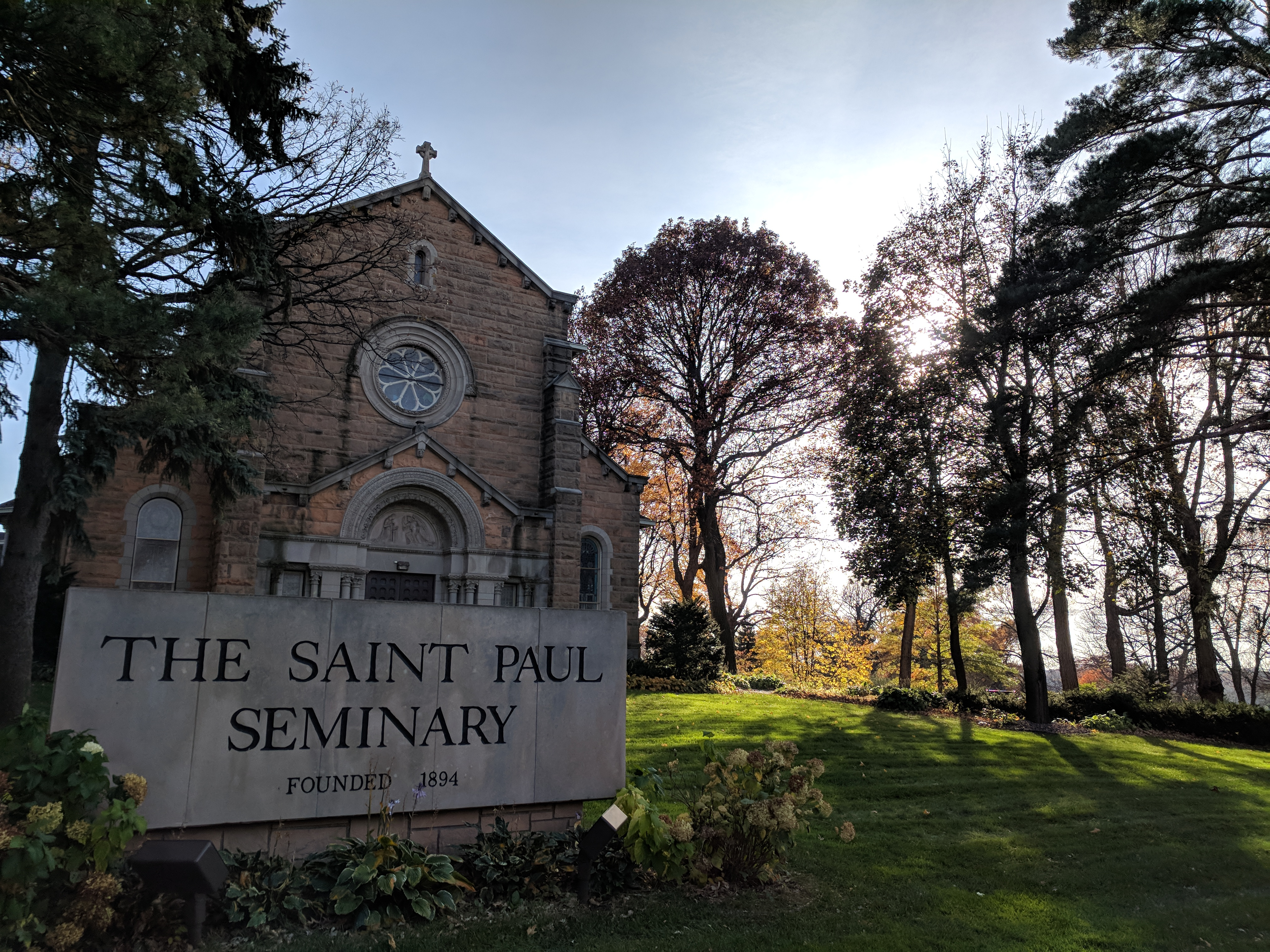
- Saint Mary's Chapel at Saint Paul Seminary
- Motto: Joyful, Catholic leaders. Thriving parishes, families and communities.
- Type: Seminary
- Established: 1894
- Religious affiliation: Catholic Church
- Academic affiliations: ATS
- President: Bernard Hebda
- Rector: Joseph Taphorn
- Location: Saint Paul, Minnesota, U.S. 44.9403°N 93.1966°W
- Colors: Navy and gold
- Website: saintpaulseminary.org

The Saint Paul Seminary (SPS) is a Catholic major seminary in Saint Paul, Minnesota, United States. A part of the Archdiocese of Saint Paul and Minneapolis, SPS prepares men to enter the priesthood and permanent diaconate, and educates lay men and women on Catholic theology.

SPS sits adjacent to the south campus of the University of St. Thomas. Since its creation in 1894, over 3,000 seminarians from SPS have been ordained priests. Thirty-three of these priests were consecrated as bishops, including three archbishops. One SPS alumnus, Archbishop Fulton J. Sheen, is a candidate for canonization.

== History ==
=== Early history ===
After the opening of St. John's College in 1867, most minor seminarians for the Diocese of Saint Paul were educated there or at other seminary institutions in the United States or in Europe. However, Thomas Grace hoped that eventually a dedicated college for the diocese would be founded, and in November 1866 purchased forty acres on the shores of Lake Johanna with the hope it would eventually become a seminary.

Grace's successor, John Ireland, took office in June 1884, and in December of that same year announced plans to build a seminary for the diocese, which would become the College of St. Thomas. The fledgling college was not unique among Catholic institutions of its time in that it functioned as a sort of combination theological seminary, minor seminary, junior college, high school, and junior high school. The land at Lake Johanna would eventually become Nazareth Hall Preparatory Seminary. The College of Saint Thomas was established in 1885.

There was a desire for a dedicated theologate seminary, and plans for a major seminary to be established on the land kitty-corner to the college were formed. Ireland's primary benefactor for this project was James J. Hill, president of the Great Northern Railway. Hill was a Protestant, but his wife Mary Hill was a devout Catholic. In honor of his wife, James Hill donated $500,000 to create SPS.

The campus of the Saint Paul Seminary was designed by architect Cass Gilbert, who also designed the Minnesota State Capitol. The six original buildings were constructed to look like a train depot (the SPS administration building), a steam engine (gymnasium and physical plant), box cars (Cretin, Grace (though constructed in 1913), and Loras halls), a refectory, and a roundhouse (school building). The campus was completed in 1894. The dormitory row (Loras, Cretin, and Grace halls) at SPS was nominated to the National Register of Historic Places in 1986 as a historic district, but the listing was never finalized.

The dedication ceremony for the Saint Paul Seminary was attended by the apostolic delegate to the United States, Archbishop Francesco Satolli, four other archbishops, ten bishops, and over four hundred priests. The Pontifical Mass was attended by 20,000 people all told. The Mass was celebrated outdoors, with an altar constructed up against the administration building.

When it opened in 1894, SPS had sixty-five seminarians. By 1900, enrollment had risen to 110 seminarians from all over the Midwest and as far away as San Francisco, California.

John Ireland's deep involvement with the Catholic University of America led to an affiliation that allowed any graduate of SPS to present himself for a baccelaureate degree from CUA.

Ireland then began the second phase of the SPS project; erecting St. Mary's Chapel. Its decoration was quite plain to begin with until Archbishop Austin Dowling undertook a remodeling of the interior in the 1920s. It was dedicated on May 4, 1905, by Bishop Joseph Cotter of Winona; Bishop James McGolrick of Duluth celebrated the Pontifical Mass, and Bishop Thomas O'Gorman of Sioux Falls preached.

The unexpected deaths of Cotter and Bishop John Shanley of Fargo and the resignation of Bishop John Stariha of Lead, all in 1909, prompted a crisis of the episcopate in the Upper Midwest. In addition, the Diocese of Crookston and Diocese of Bismarck were established. As such, there were five sees that required bishops. With the additional assignment of an axuliary bishop for Saint Paul, six priests required episcopal consecration. That consecration took place at St. Mary's Chapel on May 19, 1910. Approximately 1,000 people filled the chapel that day for the ceremony.

=== Seminary restructuring ===
Prior to the founding of Saint John Vianney Seminary, students received their education in a "6-6" plan at Nazareth Hall Preparatory Seminary and the Saint Paul Seminary. In 1959, Archbishop William Brady ordered a feasibility study for a "4-4-4" plan for priestly formation: four years of study at Nazareth Hall Preparatory Seminary, four years of study at the College of Saint Thomas, and four years of study at the Saint Paul Seminary. This plan was overwhelmingly supported. However, due to declining enrollment after the Second Vatican Council, by 1967 the "4-4-4" plan seemed no longer feasible and there was a stronger desire to create a college seminary at the University of St. Thomas and close Nazareth Hall. Saint John Vianney Seminary was founded in 1968, and Nazareth Hall was closed in 1971, thereby moving to a "4-4" plan with no high school seminary.

While the Saint Paul Seminary and University of St. Thomas both were owned by the archdiocese and were next to each, they operated separately. In 1980, rector William Baumgartner began to think that collaboration between the two institutions could have some great benefit. Bishop Kinney of Saint Cloud suggested a merger in 1981. From 1983 to 1987, there was much discussion and politics attempting to determine what such a union should look like. Finally, in 1987, an agreement was made. Under the agreement, Saint Paul Seminary built new administration and dormitory buildings and sold the most of its land and buildings to St. Thomas, including Loras, Grace, and Cretin residence halls and the Binz refectory. The Ireland library building was included in the sale, but the books remained the property of Saint Paul Seminary. The reorganization allowed SPS increased resources for formation of seminarians to priests. The new School of Divinity provided graduate level course in theology for lay people who wished to assume leadership roles in their parishes and schools. The School of Divinity remained under the jurisdiction of SPS.

St. Mary's Chapel was also renovated at that time.

=== Contemporary history ===
In 2005, Aloysius R. Callaghan was appointed rector of SPS. During his tenure as rector, Saint Paul Seminary greatly increased its enrollment and programs.

On January 1, 2019, Joseph Taphorn succeeded Callaghan as Saint Paul Seminary rector. Under Taphorn, restructuring to allow for the implementation of a propadeutic year began.

== Campus ==
=== Academic buildings ===
The Archbishop Ireland Memorial Library is the theological library of SPS with over 110,000 volumes. The library is integrated into the University of St. Thomas library system so that non-seminary students are able to use its resources as well. Classes are held in the Brady Educational Center, which also houses the undergraduate music department of the University of St. Thomas.

=== Residence and administration buildings ===
Loras, Grace, and Cretin halls were the original SPS residence buildings; they were sold to the University of St. Thomas during the seminary/university affiliation agreement. Ground was broken on the current residence and administration buildings in 1988, and they were completed in 1989.

Seminarians in the propadeutic program live in a former convent several blocks off-campus.

=== St. Mary's Chapel ===
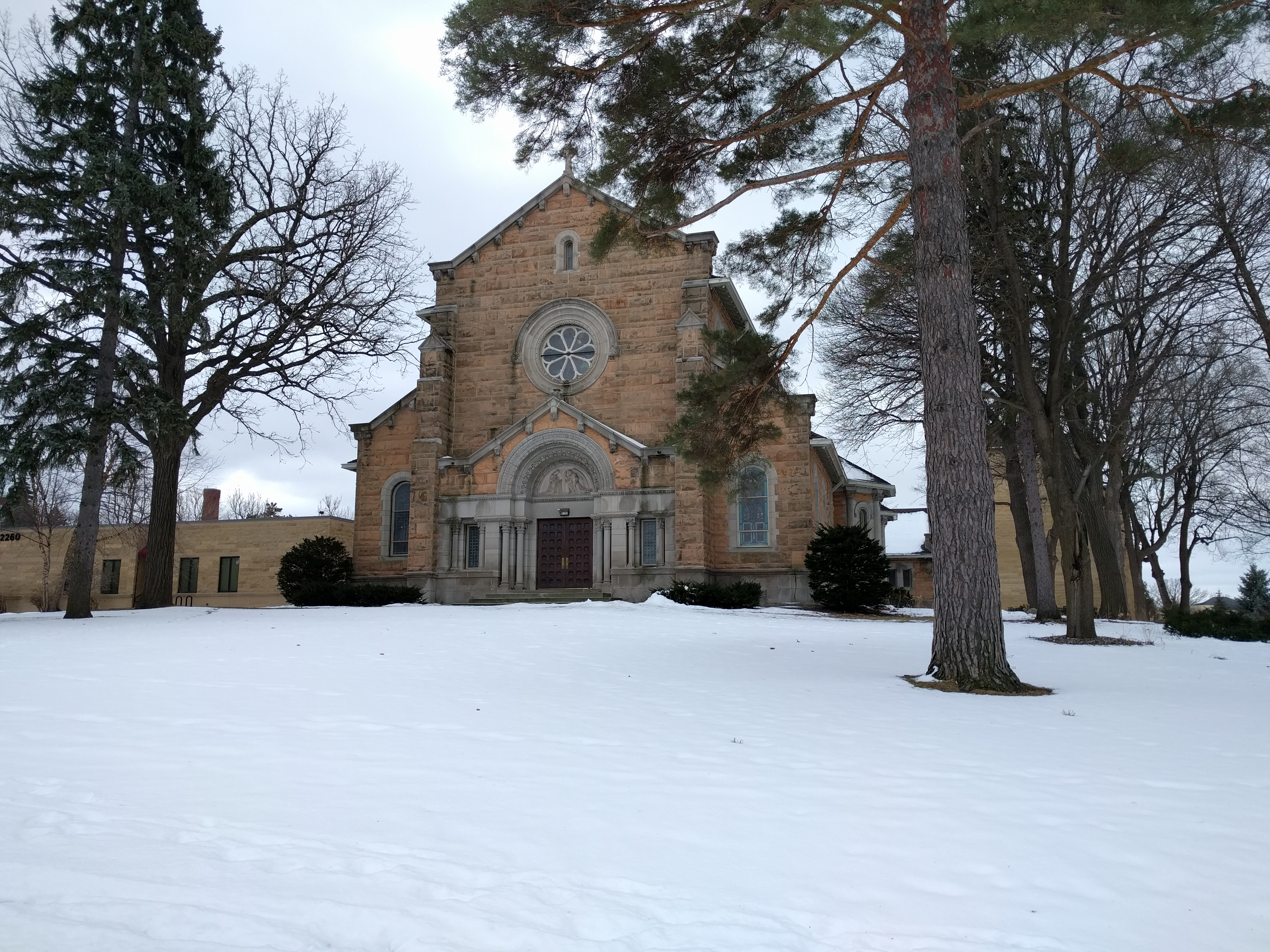
Chapel from Summit Avenue

The center of Ireland's vision for SPS, was the chapel dedicated to the Blessed Virgin Mary. The cornerstone of the chapel was laid during a Pontifical Mass on July 2, 1901, the fiftieth anniversary of Bishop Joseph Crétin's arrival in the new diocese. Though envisioned in 1891, the chapel was only completed by architect Clarence H. Johnston, Sr., who completed the last of Hill's ambitious building project, in an Italian Romanesque style. St. Mary's chapel was officially consecrated by Bishop Cotter on May 24, 1905, in another Pontifical High Mass celebrated by Bishop McGolrick. Under Archbishop Austin Dowling, the interior of the chapel was finished in the 1920s.

Bishop Fulton Sheen, in his autobiography A Treasure in Clay, talks about how his love for a daily Holy Hour was started at St. Mary's Chapel.

The chapel was renovated in 1988, as part of the construction of the new SPS building, with a new design by Frank Kacmarcik which included reversing the interior of the chapel, removing the statues from the side altars, and removing or updating many components of the interior decoration.

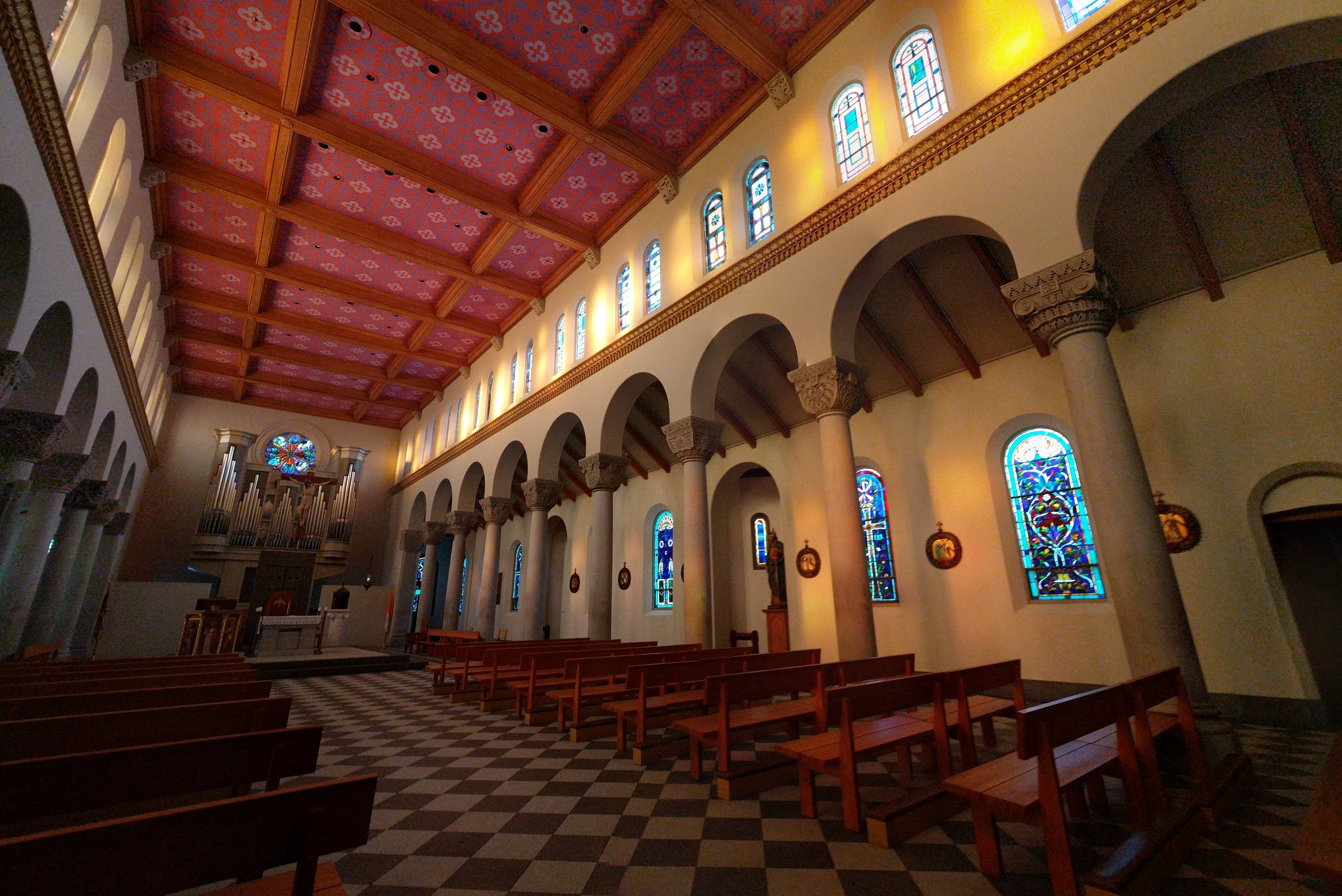
Chapel interior

Presently, the interior of the chapel has begun to be redecorated when the original Stations of the Cross were restored to the chapel, a statue of Our Lady of Confidence (Madonna della Fiducia) was installed and dedicated in a side-altar niche, and a relic of Mother Teresa of Calcutta was placed for veneration in the chapel. All of the new additions were done under the direction of rector Aloysius Callaghan.

== Divisions ==
=== Priestly formation ===
As of the 2022–2023 academic year, SPS had 82 seminarians in formation for the priesthood, representing 16 dioceses and religious communities. These students were spread across the propaedeutic, pre-theology, and theology programs.

Seminarians participate in a wide variety of activities, including choir, schola, theatre, and sports. In the past, SPS had a theatre program going back as far as 1939. The program appears to have died out in the late 1960s. In 2013, seminarians revived the theatre program and have put on various plays and musicals, many of them originals, since then. While most of the productions have only been put on by seminarians from SPS, Saint John Vianney College Seminary has been invited to join some of them as well.

Each year in October, Saint John Vianney College Seminary (playing as the "JAXX") and SPS (playing as the "Sons of Thunder") play each other in a flag football game called the "Rectors' Bowl." SPS has won twelve of the nineteen Rectors' Bowls. In the spring, there is a priest/seminarian basketball tournament where Saint John Vianney College Seminary and the SPS face-off, and the winner of that match plays a team consisting of priests from the Archdiocese of Saint Paul and Minneapolis. Seminarians regularly play frisbee, basketball, and other sports together. They also regularly participate in other seminary tournaments such as the Conception Seminary soccer & volleyball tournament.

=== Academic Programs ===
Saint Paul Seminary offers three master's degrees. The Master of Divinity is for seminary students pursuing priesthood. The Master of Arts in Theology degree is a two-year, 36 credit program focused on academic theology. While students of the MAT program are primarily laypeople, it can also be taken by seminarians alongside their M.Div. degree. SPS also has a Master of Arts in Pastoral Leadership (MAPL) program, which is also 36 credits.

=== Institutes ===
Saint Paul Seminary has five institutes for clerical and lay formation. In 2023, the Institute for Diaconate Formation had 33 men in formation for the permanent diaconate, the Archbishop Harry J. Flynn Catechetical Institute had 2,200 a two-year, non-degree faith formation program, 30 students in the Institute for Catholic School Leadership, and 867 participants in the Institute for Ongoing Clergy Formation. The Institute for Catholic Theological Formation is for the further education of scholars and theologians.

== Notable faculty ==
Some notable past and present faculty members of SPS include:

- Aloysius R. Callaghan
- Bishop Peter F. Christensen
- Bishop Andrew Cozzens
- Katarina Schuth

== Notable alumni ==
- Bishop Joseph John Annabring
- Bishop Juan Carlos Bravo Salazar
- Bishop William Henry Bullock
- Archbishop James Byrne
- Bishop Frederick F. Campbell
- Archbishop Robert J. Carlson
- Bishop Peter F. Christensen
- Bishop Leonard Cowley
- Bishop Andrew Cozzens
- Dennis Dease
- Bishop Donald DeGrood
- Bishop Paul Dudley
- Bishop James Albert Duffy
- Bishop Lawrence Glenn
- Bishop Thomas O'Gorman
- Bishop Hilary Baumann Hacker
- Patrick J. Hessian, 16th Chief of Chaplains of the United States Army from 1982 to 1986.
- Bishop Lambert Anthony Hoch
- Bishop Michael Izen
- Bishop Kevin Kenney
- Bishop John Francis Kinney
- Bishop Louis Benedict Kucera
- Bishop Raymond W. Lessard
- Bishop Raymond Alphonse Lucker
- Bishop Lawrence James McNamara
- Bishop John Jeremiah McRaith
- Francis Missia
- Bishop Gerald Francis O'Keefe
- James O'Neill, Brigadier General, U.S. Army
- Bishop John Opoku-Agyemang
- Bishop Richard Pates
- Archbishop John Roach
- John A. Ryan
- Patrick J. Ryan, American major general who served as the ninth Chief of Chaplains of the United States Army from 1954 to 1958.
- Francis L. Sampson, 12th Chief of Chaplains of the United States Army from 1967 to 1971; he saved the real "Private Ryan" who the movie Saving Private Ryan was based on.
- Bishop Francis Schenk
- Bishop Alphonse James Schladweiler
- Mike Schmitz
- William Shannahan
- Donald W. Shea, 19th Chief of Chaplains of the United States Army from 1994 to 1999.
- Archbishop Fulton Sheen
- Bishop Paul Sirba
- Bishop George Henry Speltz
- Bishop Sylvester William Treinen
- Henry Timothy ("Tim") Vakoc, the first U.S. military chaplain to die from wounds received in the Iraq War.
- Bishop Nicolas Walsh
- Bishop Thomas Anthony Welch
- Bishop Stephen S. Woznicki

== History of rectors ==
- Louis Eugene Caillet (1894–1897)
- Patrick R. Heffron (1897–1910)
- Francis J. Schaefer (1910–1921)
- Humphrey Moynihan (1921–1933)
- William O. Brady (1933–1939)
- Lawrence O. Wolf (1939–1943)
- James Louis Connolly (1943–1945)
- Rudolph G. Bandas (1945–1958)
- Bishop William O. Brady (1958)
- Louis J. McCarthy (1958–1968)
- William Baumgaertner (1968–1980)
- Charles Froehle (1980–1993)
- Phillip J. Rask (1993–2002)
- Bishop Frederick Campbell (2002–2005)
- Aloysius R. Callaghan (2006–2018)
- Joseph Taphorn (2019–present)

== Sponsoring dioceses and religious orders ==
- Archdiocese of St. Paul and Minneapolis
- Diocese of Boise
- Diocese of Crookston
- Diocese of Des Moines
- Diocese of Duluth
- Diocese of Fargo
- Archdiocese of Hartford
- Diocese of Helena
- Diocese of New Ulm
- Archdiocese of Omaha
- Pro Ecclesia Sancta (Peru)
- Diocese of Rapid City
- Diocese of St. Cloud
- Diocese of Sioux Falls
- Diocese of Winona-Rochester

Updated as of 2022.
