= Phil Vischer =

American filmmaker (born 1966)

- Born: Phillip Roger Vischer; June 16, 1966 (age 60); Muscatine, Iowa, U.S.
- Education: Glenbard West High School
- Alma mater: St. Paul Bible College
- Occupations: Filmmaker, animator, author, puppeteer, voice actor
- Years active: 1986–present
- Known for: VeggieTales; Minno; 3-2-1 Penguins; What's in the Bible; Holy Post podcast
- Spouse: Lisa Pautz (m. 1990)
- Children: 3
- Relatives: Rob Vischer (brother)
- Website: philvischer.com

Phillip Roger Vischer (born June 16, 1966) is an American filmmaker, animator, author, puppeteer, and voice actor. He is the creator of the animated video series VeggieTales alongside Mike Nawrocki. He provided the voice of Bob the Tomato, Archibald Asparagus, Pa Grape, Jimmy Gourd, Mr. Lunt, Mr. Nezzer, Phillipe Pea and about half of the other characters in the series. Currently, he owns a small film business, Jellyfish Labs, based in Wheaton, Illinois.

== Early life and education ==
Vischer was born on June 16, 1966, in Muscatine, Iowa, United States, and grew up in Chicago, Illinois with his younger brother, Rob Vischer, who is the President of the University of St. Thomas in St. Paul, Minnesota. He attended Glenbard West High School and graduated in 1984. For three semesters, Vischer attended St. Paul Bible College (currently known as Crown College); around that time, he also worked at a small Christian video production company. As a teen, he was in a band with his brothers called the "Raging Melons".

== Career ==
According to Vischer's autobiography, Me, Myself, and Bob, Vischer and his longtime friend Mike Nawrocki founded Big Idea Productions in the late 1980s as GRAFx Studios. It started out as a small business that used computer animation to make its films. Eventually, Phil Vischer and Nawrocki created VeggieTales and renamed the company to Big Idea Productions. The "Big Idea" for Vischer, was to teach children about right-from-wrong using God's messages from the Bible. The characters they came up with were Bob the Tomato and Larry the Cucumber. They chose vegetables to serve as the characters because they were easier to animate than human characters. A normal segment of VeggieTales would begin with both talking vegetables on a countertop receiving a letter from someone asking about a particular Christian topic (selfishness, fear, lying, sharing, etcetera) followed by two short stories about the topic. In the middle of the segment would be a silly song. Not only would Vischer and Nawrocki serve as the producers and directors of the show, but they would also voice most of the characters in the franchise (the most by Vischer).

The studio's first big creation was 1993 direct-to-video VeggieTales episode "Where's God When I'm S-Scared?" which was released on home video in late 1993. Big Idea's next video was "God Wants Me To Forgive Them?!?" which was released in 1994 and included the help of their first professional voice actor Jeff Morrow. In late 1994, the series' third video, "Are You My Neighbor?", was released and VeggieTales continued releasing at least one video per year and even released their own newsletter called "What's the Big Idea?". The series was an enormous hit and, by the late-1990s, had earned the company millions of dollars every year.

By 1999, Vischer slowly found himself running a company that was losing money due to a variety of circumstances. Their series continued being a hit in the market, but Vischer's decision to take out a loan and produce their first full-length film, Jonah: A VeggieTales Movie, caused the company to slowly fall apart financially. To make things worse, Big Idea's termination of their association with their long-time distributor Lyrick Studios (the company behind Barney & Friends and Wishbone), caused Lyrick's successor, HiT Entertainment to file a lawsuit against the company for "breach-of-contract". Vischer offered to settle with HiT for $500,000 but, HiT declined and the case went to trial after the judge denied Big Idea's motion for summary judgement. A jury ultimately ruled against Big Idea in 2003, awarding HiT & Lyrick $11M. Although the verdict was later overturned on appeal, the damage was done, and Big Idea filed for Chapter 11 bankruptcy in the summer of 2003. After Big Idea was purchased by Classic Media in 2004, Vischer further worked on VeggieTales under contract as a writer until 2009 (and continued to provide the voice of Bob and others until 2017, when his contract ended). Soon after Vischer's departure, VeggieTales was cancelled.

=== After bankruptcy ===
After selling Big Idea, Phil Vischer took two years off to recuperate. He then started a brand-new production studio called Jellyfish Labs in order to launch his new business vision; JellyTelly, which he intended to be "a Nickelodeon for Christians." Phil Vischer said in his book that he believed that his heart had turned from God while being CEO of Big Idea and that the company's fall was a "wake-up call" and, because of this, Vischer limits his own power at Jellyfish Labs and allows God to "guide the company."

In late 2009, Vischer began production on a new spin-off series of his puppet show from JellyTelly, What's in the Bible, a 13-DVD series that walks children through the Bible, from Genesis to Revelation. According to Vischer,

What's in the Bible teaches Christianity in the same way Walt Disney taught America about space travel and Our Friend the Atom on TV in the 50s and 60s, and the same way Carl Sagan taught America about The Cosmos on PBS in the 80s.

Vischer hired renowned YouTubers Rhett McLaughlin and Link Neal to write, sing, and perform several songs about the books of the Bible for the series. The series was distributed by Tyndale House Publishers. The 13 episodes of What's in the Bible were released between March 2010 to March 2014.

Beginning in 2012, Vischer began to host The Holy Post Podcast (formerly The Phil Vischer Podcast), a weekly podcast discussing life, pop-culture, media, and theology through the use of humor in what he characterizes as a "post-Christian" American culture. The podcast, co-hosted by writer and former Christianity Today editor Skye Jethani and documentary producer & voiceover actress Christian Taylor, provides thorough critiques of American Christians' engagement with politics and the public square. It regularly ranks in the top 100 podcasts.

In June 2020, Phil Vischer launched a video streaming service named MrPhil.TV. He said he launched the streaming service one month early due to the COVID-19 pandemic. MrPhil.TV features non-VeggieTales content that Vischer created, including The Mr. Phil Show (created for Right Now Media), and What's in the Bible. Vischer said that he had to pay for the ability to upload What's in the Bible, since he had sold it to another party.

=== Revival of VeggieTales ===
In March 2019, Phil Vischer announced on his Twitter that he had re-teamed with his longtime partner Mike Nawrocki at TBN to revive the VeggieTales series. Just like previously, Vischer and Nawrocki would return to voice their characters and also work as writers for the new show. It marked the first time that Vischer had any control of the franchise since selling Big Idea at the end of 2003. At first, Vischer declined involvement in the TBN reboot until he realized that TBN intended to continue the concept of the original VeggieTales direct-to-video series, before it became a DreamWorks franchise.

In 2021, Vischer announced on Twitter that he and Nawrocki had departed from the franchise after being denied greater creative control by Big Idea Entertainment and claimed that the unit was looking to recast their characters.

=== Voice acting ===
As the co-creator of VeggieTales, alongside Mike Nawrocki, he has voiced hundreds of characters. Among them being; Bob the Tomato, Archibald Asparagus, Pa Grape, Mr. Lunt, Jimmy Gourd, Mr. Nezzer, Philippe Pea and several others.

With JellyTelly, he has been the puppeteer and voice of several characters including Buck Denver, Captain Pete, Helen Rosenfiddle, Sunday School Lady, and others.

== Views ==
Vischer has commented on social and political issues in interviews, on his Twitter, and through his podcast.

In 2019, Vischer expressed concern over rising LGBT representation in children's media in response to Arthur's depiction of a same-sex marriage.

In 2020, following the murder of George Floyd, Vischer put out a 17-minute video addressing systemic racism. He told Fox News,

As the country was wrestling with protests and riots, I began to notice videos flying among conservative white Christians on social media chiming in on the situation, often with little or no connection to actual facts or history. I wondered if maybe I could pull something together that could walk people through history without bashing anyone’s political party or calling them names.

Some of Vischer's detractors described him as "woke". As of 2021, Vischer in his website Holy Post has continued discussions on race in America.

== Personal life ==
Vischer lives in Wheaton, Illinois. His wife Lisa (née Pautz) Vischer provided voices to several characters in the VeggieTales series, most notably Junior Asparagus. They married in 1990 and have three children together.

== Filmography ==
Year	Title	Role	Notes
1993–2015	VeggieTales	Bob the Tomato, Archibald Asparagus, Mr. Lunt, Pa Grape, Jimmy Gourd, Mr. Nezzer, Phillipe Pea, Scallion 1, Frankencelery, Grandpa George, Tom Grape, Apollo Gourd, Goliath, Percy Pea, Silly Song Announcer, Additional Voices (voice)	Co-creator, director, producer, writer and composer
1996	Fabulicious Day	N/A	Animator
2000–2008	3-2-1 Penguins!	N/A	Co-developer, writer, executive producer
2002	Jonah: A VeggieTales Movie	Archibald Asparagus (as Jonah and Twippo), Bob the Tomato, Mr. Lunt, Pa Grape, Percy Pea, Phillipe Pea, Nezzer, Cockney Pea 2, King Twistomer. (voice)	Director, writer and composer
2002–2003	Larryboy: The Cartoon Adventures	Archibald, Bob the Tomato, Scarlet Tomato (voice)	Co-creator, writer, executive producer
2006–2009	Veggietales on TV!	Bob the Tomato, Archibald Asparagus, Mr. Lunt, Jimmy Gourd, Pa Grape, Additional Voices (voice)	Developer, writer, composer, executive producer
2008	The Pirates Who Don't Do Anything: A VeggieTales Movie	George (Pa Grape), Sedgewick (Mr. Lunt), Willory (Archibald Asparagus), Mr. Hibbing (Mr. Nezzer), Bob the Tomato, Sir Frederick (Jimmy Gourd), Pirate Phillipe Pea, Pirate Spy (Scallion 1) (voice)	Writer, producer, and composer
2010–2014	What's in the Bible?	Himself, Buck Denver, Clive, Ian, Sunday School Lady, Cap'n Pete, Dr. Schniffenhousen, Marcy, Michael, Pastor Paul, Chuck Wagon, Brother Louie, Agnes, Winifred (Voice/puppeteer)	Creator, director, producer, writer, and composer
2012–present	The Holy Post (Note: formerly the Phil Vischer Podcast)	Himself/co-host	Co-creator and co-producer
2014–2016	VeggieTales in the House	Bob the Tomato, Archibald Asparagus, Pa Grape, Jimmy Gourd, Mr. Lunt, Rooney the Olive Dog, Phillipe Pea, Granny Asparagus, Additional Voices (voice)	
2014	Holy Ghost	Himself	Documentary
2015	Galaxy Buck: Mission to Sector 9	Buck Denver, Clive, Ian, Sunday School Lady, Marcy, Pastor Paul, Cap'n Pete, Aliens, Old Man (Voice/puppeteer)	Director, producer and writer
2017	VeggieTales in the City	Bob the Tomato, Archibald Asparagus, Pa Grape, Jimmy Gourd, Mr. Lunt, Rooney the Olive Dog, Phillipe Pea, Granny Asparagus, Additional Voices (voice)	
2018–present	The Mr. Phil Show	Himself, Sam the Turtle, Carlo the Singing Hermit Crab, Johnny Cashew, Mac Adamia (Voice)	Creator, writer, director, producer, composer
2019–2022	The VeggieTales Show	Bob the Tomato, Archibald Asparagus, Mr. Lunt, Pa Grape, Jimmy Gourd, Phillipe Pea, Goliath, Mr. Nezzer (role shared with David Mann), Scallion 1, Guy Broccoli, Additional Voices (voice)	Co-Creator, Writer, Executive Producer, and Composer
2025	The Dead Sea Squirrels	Larry Squirrel	
TBA	The Phil & Mike Show	Phil, Stanley, Louis, Marcy, Michael, Sunday School Lady	

== Published works ==
Books by Phil Vischer include the following:

- Junior's Colors (1997) ISBN 0-8499-1487-6
- How Many Veggies? (1997) ISBN 0-8499-1488-4
- Pa Grape's Shapes (1997) ISBN 0-8499-1507-4
- Bob & Larry's ABC's (1997) ISBN 0-8499-5986-1
- The Story of Flibber-o-Loo (1997)
- Rack, Shack and Benny (1997)
- Dave and the Giant Pickle (1997)
- Larry-Boy! And the Fib from Outer Space! (1997)
- Archibald's Opposites (1998) ISBN 0-8499-1533-3
- Time for Tom (1998) ISBN 0-8499-1534-1
- A Snoodle's Tale (2004) ISBN 0-310-70751-X
- Sidney & Norman: A Tale of Two Pigs (2005) ISBN 1-4003-0834-8
- Me, Myself, & Bob (2006) ISBN 0-7852-2207-3
- 47 Beavers on the Big Blue Sea (2007) ISBN 1-4003-0836-4
- I Thank God for This Day (2012)
- Why Do We Call it Christmas? (2014)
- What is Easter? (2015)
- The Laugh and Learn Bible For Kids (2019)
- The Laugh and Learn Bible For Little Ones (2020)
- God is Bigger than the Boogie-Man (2024)
