= Cretin Hall =

Coordinates: 44°56′22″N 93°11′42″W

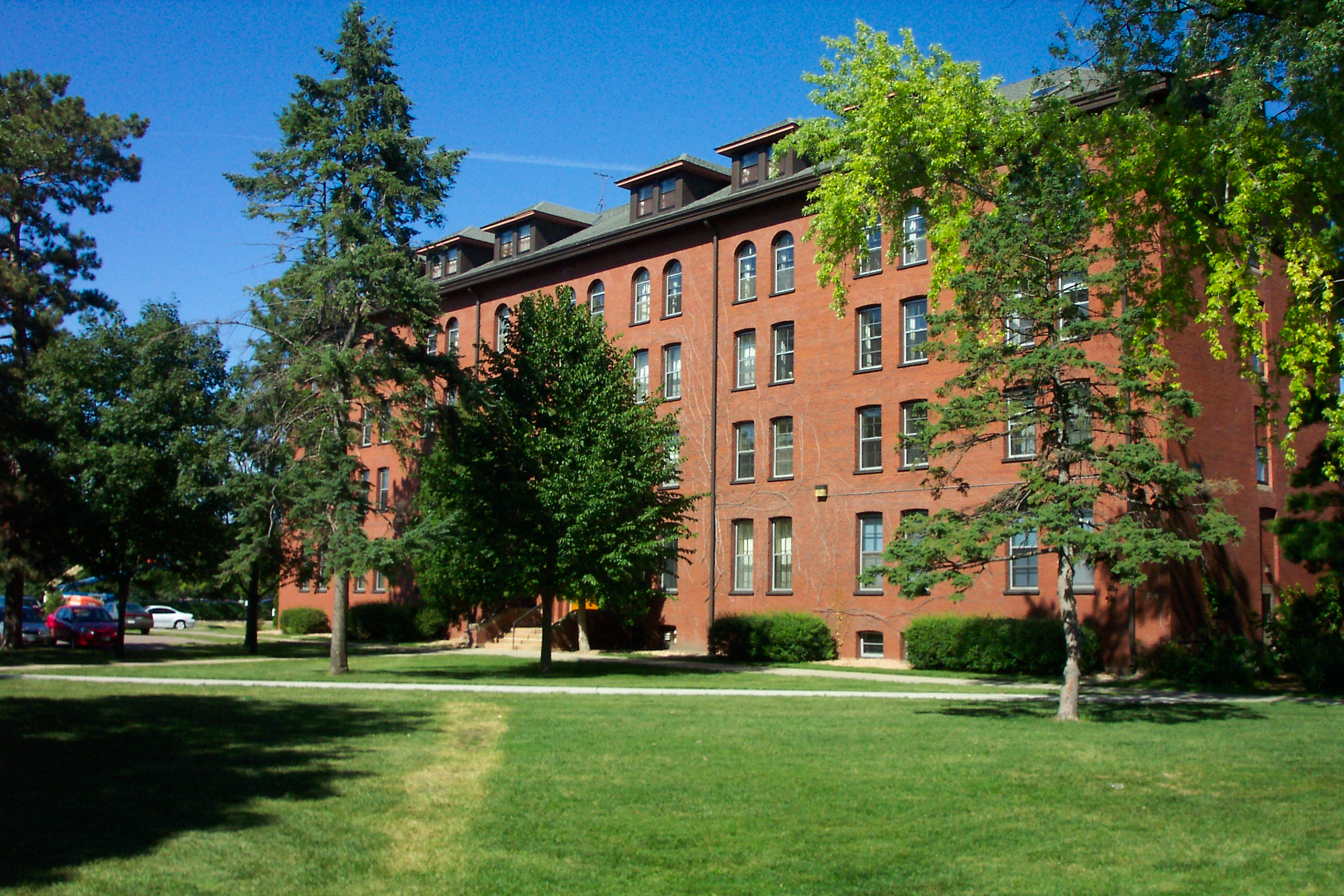
Cretin Hall from the original front

Cretin Hall was one of the male undergraduate residence halls at the University of St. Thomas in Saint Paul, Minnesota. It resided on the South Campus, just south of historic Summit Avenue. Cretin Hall was originally constructed as the South Student Residence Building for the Saint Paul Seminary in 1894. It was designed by architect Cass Gilbert, who also designed Cretin's two sister buildings, Loras Hall (demolished in 2021) and Grace Hall. In 1987 Cretin Hall was acquired by St. Thomas and in 1989 it was renovated for use as a residence hall.

Cretin Hall was named after the first Roman Catholic Bishop of St. Paul, Joseph Crétin. Initial funding came from a $500,000 donation by Great Northern Railway President James J. Hill. Hill’s donation paid for the construction of the Cretin Residence Hall and its twin, Loras Residence Hall.

Cretin Residence Hall was a 4 1/2-story, hipped-roof building faced in red pressed brick and designed in what Gilbert called a “Northern Italian style.”

On January 17, 2023, St. Thomas announced plans for a new on-campus indoor arena. As part of the plans, Cretin Hall and two other buildings would be demolished to make way for the arena. The school announced that the 2023–2024 school year would be the final for students at Cretin Hall, with demolition scheduled for June 21, 2024.

== Specifications ==
Cretin housed 90 students on 5 levels. Community bathrooms with private shower stalls were located on each floor. Common areas included a service desk, computer room, recreation area, kitchenette, laundry room and recreation and TV areas.
