= David Renz =

Professor of public policy

David O. Renz is a professor of public policy and the director of the Midwest Center for Nonprofit Leadership at the Henry W. Bloch School of Management at the University of Missouri-Kansas City.

He was the former executive director of the Metropolitan Council and the assistant commissioner of Minnesota Department of Labor and Industry.

== Education and career ==
David holds a B.S. in organizational communications, M.A. in industrial relations, and a Ph.D. degree with a concentration in organization theory and administration, both from the University of Minnesota and taught at the Hamline University, University of St. Thomas and the University of Missouri.

He has published in various journals including Nonprofit and Voluntary Sector Quarterly and The American Review of Public Administration and is the editor of The Jossey-Bass Handbook of Nonprofit Leadership And Management (ISBN 978-0470392508).
