= Aloysius R. Callaghan =

American Roman Catholic priest

Very Reverend Monsignor Aloysius R. Callaghan STL, JCD
- Diocese: Roman Catholic Diocese of Allentown
- Previous post: Rector of the Saint Paul Seminary School of Divinity

Orders
- Ordination: December 17, 1971 by James Cardinal Hickey
- Rank: Honorary Prelate

Personal details
- Born: September 15, 1946 (age 79) Heckscherville, Pennsylvania
- Denomination: Roman Catholic
- Parents: Aloysius R. Callaghan Sr. and Genevieve Callaghan
- Education: Pontifical Lateran University

Aloysius R. Callaghan, STL, JCD (born September 15, 1946) is a Roman Catholic priest of the Diocese of Allentown and rector emeritus of the Saint Paul Seminary School of Divinity. He has also served in various roles in the Vatican and the Archdiocese for the Military Services.

== Biography ==
Aloysius R. Callaghan was born on September 15, 1946, in Heckscherville, Pennsylvania, to Aloysius R. Callaghan Sr. and Genevieve Callaghan. He attended St. Charles Borromeo Seminary in Philadelphia in 1962. After completing his studies there he attended the Pontifical Roman Seminary located in the Basilica of St. John Lateran complex.

After completing his studies at the Roman Seminary he was ordained a Roman Catholic Priest by James Cardinal Hickey on December 17, 1971, in St. Peter's Basilica. From there he was assigned as the parochial vicar of St. Francis of Assisi Church in Allentown, Pennsylvania where he also had duties as an associate professor at Allentown Central Catholic High School. In 1974, he was again sent to Rome to work on his doctorate in Canon Law from the Pontifical Lateran University, completing the program in 1977. In 1984, he was named pastor of Holy Trinity Church in Whitehall, PA.

On March 27, 1986, Thomas Welsh, bishop of Allentown, released Callaghan to serve on the Vatican's Congregation for Institutes of Consecrated Life and Societies of Apostolic Life. In this job, he worked closely with Mother Teresa of Calcutta in canonical affairs concerning the Missionaries of Charity. In 1991 he was transferred to the Congregation for Bishops where he stayed until July 1995 when he became Vicar General of the Archdiocese for the Military Services. He served in that role until he was appointed as rector of Saint Paul Seminary School of Divinity in Saint Paul, Minnesota, by Archbishop Harry Flynn on July 1, 2005. During his tenure as rector, he greatly increased seminary enrollment and programs. He also oversaw many renovations to St. Mary's Chapel. He served as rector until August 15, 2018, when he was granted the status of rector emeritus. He continues to serve at the seminary in advancement and community relations.
