= Opus College of Business =

Business school of the University of St. Thomas-Minnesota

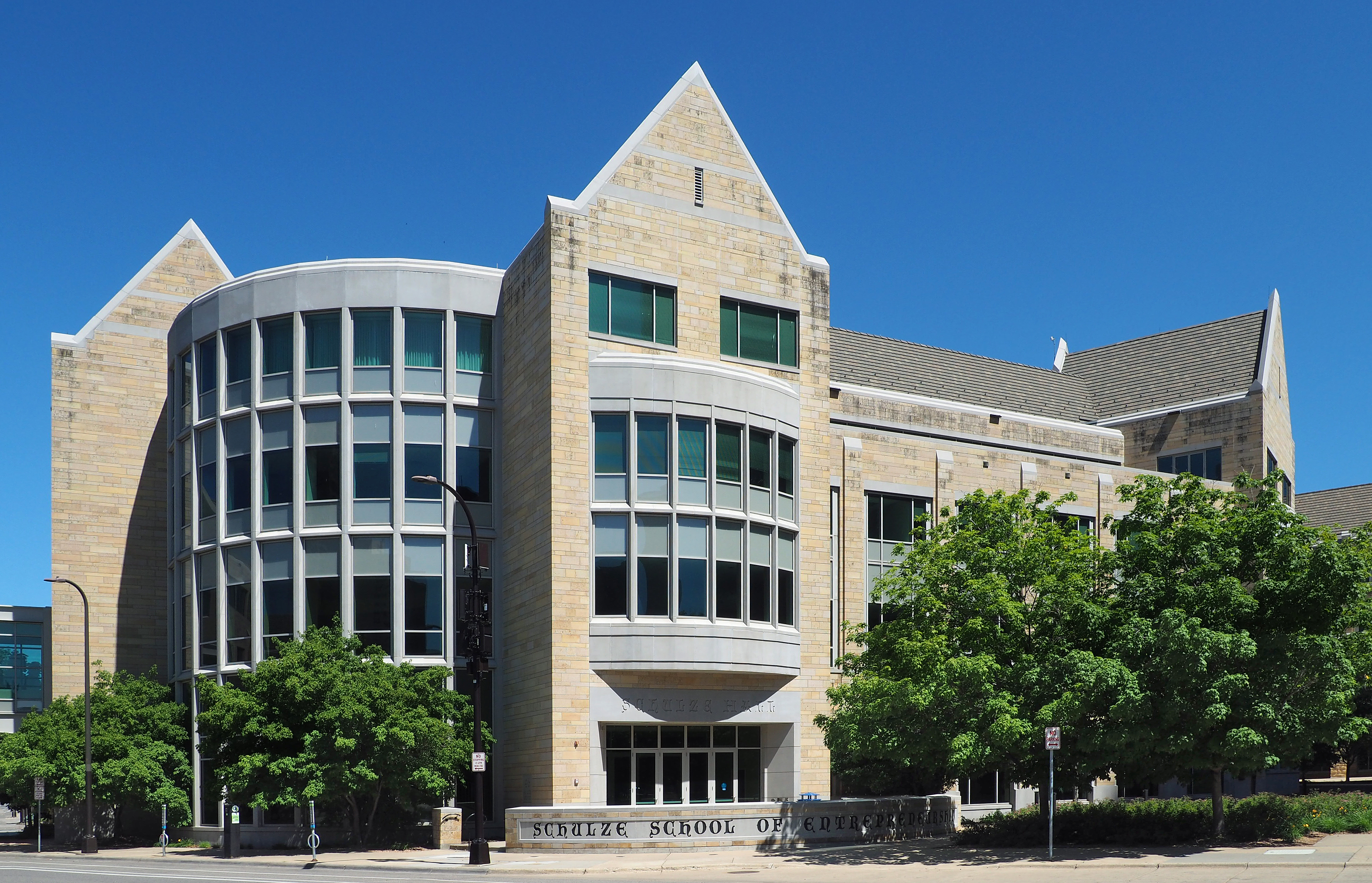
- Schulze Hall
- Type: Private business school
- Established: 1985
- Parent institution: University of St. Thomas
- Religious affiliation: Roman Catholic
- Dean: Laura Dunham, PhD
- Location: St. Paul–Minneapolis, Minnesota, United States; 44°58′27″N 93°16′38″W
- Website: business.stthomas.edu

The Opus College of Business is the business school of the University of St. Thomas, a private Catholic university in St. Paul and Minneapolis, Minnesota, United States. Since October 19, 2006, it is named for The Opus Group in recognition of the company's founder and 1948 St. Thomas alumnus Gerald Rauenhorst.

== Graduate programs ==
Opus College offers Part-time Flex, Executive, and Health Care MBA programs. As of February 12, 2020, the Full-time MBA has been suspended. The college also offers several Master of Science programs and graduate certificates. Starting in the fall 2024, Opus College intends to offer a Master of Science in Management for recent college graduates from non-business majors.

== Undergraduate programs ==
Undergraduate students may pursue one of thirteen concentrations while completing a Bachelor of Arts degree in Business Administration. In 2007, over 40% of the current undergraduates at the University of St. Thomas were pursuing a major in business administration.

== Executive Education and Professional Development ==
St. Thomas Executive Education, part of the Opus College of Business, provides professional development programs for working professionals and customized training for organizations. Established more than 60 years ago, its non-credit programs offer university-issued certificates that recognize completion of focused, career-relevant learning.

The portfolio includes both individual courses and organization-focused programs tailored to specific business needs. Program topics focus on in-demand skills for the evolving workplace, including leadership, management, project management, business analytics, and artificial intelligence.

Notable programs include the Mini MBA, the Certified Professional Project Management (CPPM) program, and AI for Professionals. St. Thomas Executive Education is an authorized training partner of the Project Management Institute (PMI).

Programs are primarily delivered in person at the university’s Minneapolis campus, with additional online and hybrid options. Courses are short in duration and focused on practical skill development. Instruction is provided by faculty and industry professionals.

== Centers and institutes ==
The centers and institutes of the University include Executive Education and Professional Development, which is where executive education and professional development programs in business communication, finance, general business, leadership and management, nonprofit management, IT, operations, and more are routinely held.

The Center for Nonprofit Management, Center for Health and Medical Affairs, Family Business Center, Norris Institute, Morrison Center for Entrepreneurship, Small Business Development Center, and Shenehon Center for Real Estate Education provide research, consultation, and program development in their respective areas of expertise.

Additionally, the Opus College of Business has affiliations with the National Institute of Health Policy, the Center for Ethical Business Cultures, and Sun Center of Excellence.

The Opus College of Business is a host of the annual Multicultural Forum.
