= Southern Catholic College =

Coordinates: 34°27′0″N 84°6′25″W

- Type: Private Catholic liberal arts college
- Established: 2000
- President: Shawn Aaron
- Faculty: 21
- Undergraduates: 248
- Postgraduates: 0
- Location: Dawsonville, Georgia, U.S.
- Campus: 100+ acres; Rural

Southern Catholic College was a private Catholic four-year college located in Dawsonville, Georgia, United States. It was founded in 2000 by Thomas J. Clements and the first classes were held in the fall of 2005 and its last classes were held in April 2010. The college was located within the Archdiocese of Atlanta. Southern Catholic was authorized by the Nonpublic Postsecondary Education Commission of the state of Georgia and was preaccredited by the American Academy for Liberal Education, located in Washington, D.C.

In April 2010, college president Shawn Aaron announced the school would be closing due to a lack of funding.

== Presidents ==
1. Jeremiah J. Ashcroft (2002–2009)
2. Shawn Aaron (2009–2010)
