= Thomas Mengler =

Thomas Mengler is the 13th president, and second lay president, of St. Mary's University in San Antonio, Texas.

Before joining St. Mary's on June 1, 2012, Mengler was dean of the law school at the University of St. Thomas (Minnesota) in Minneapolis for 10 years. Before that, he served at the University of Illinois, where he was dean of the University of Illinois College of Law as well as interim provost and vice chancellor for academic affairs.

Alumni of that law school honored Mengler by funding The Thomas M. Mengler Faculty Scholar—a position rotates among faculty members and provides recipients with a reduction in teaching load and increased research support so as to advance scholarly projects.

Mengler received a BA from Carleton College, a master's in Philosophy from The University of Texas at Austin and his Doctor of Jurisprudence from the University of Texas School of Law.
