= Disciplined Growth Investors =

American company

Disciplined Growth Investors, Inc.
- Type: Private
- Industry: Investment Management
- Founded: 1997
- Headquarters: Minneapolis, Minnesota, U.S.
- AUM: US$5.1 billion (2019)
- Number of employees: 19
- Website: http://www.dginv.com/

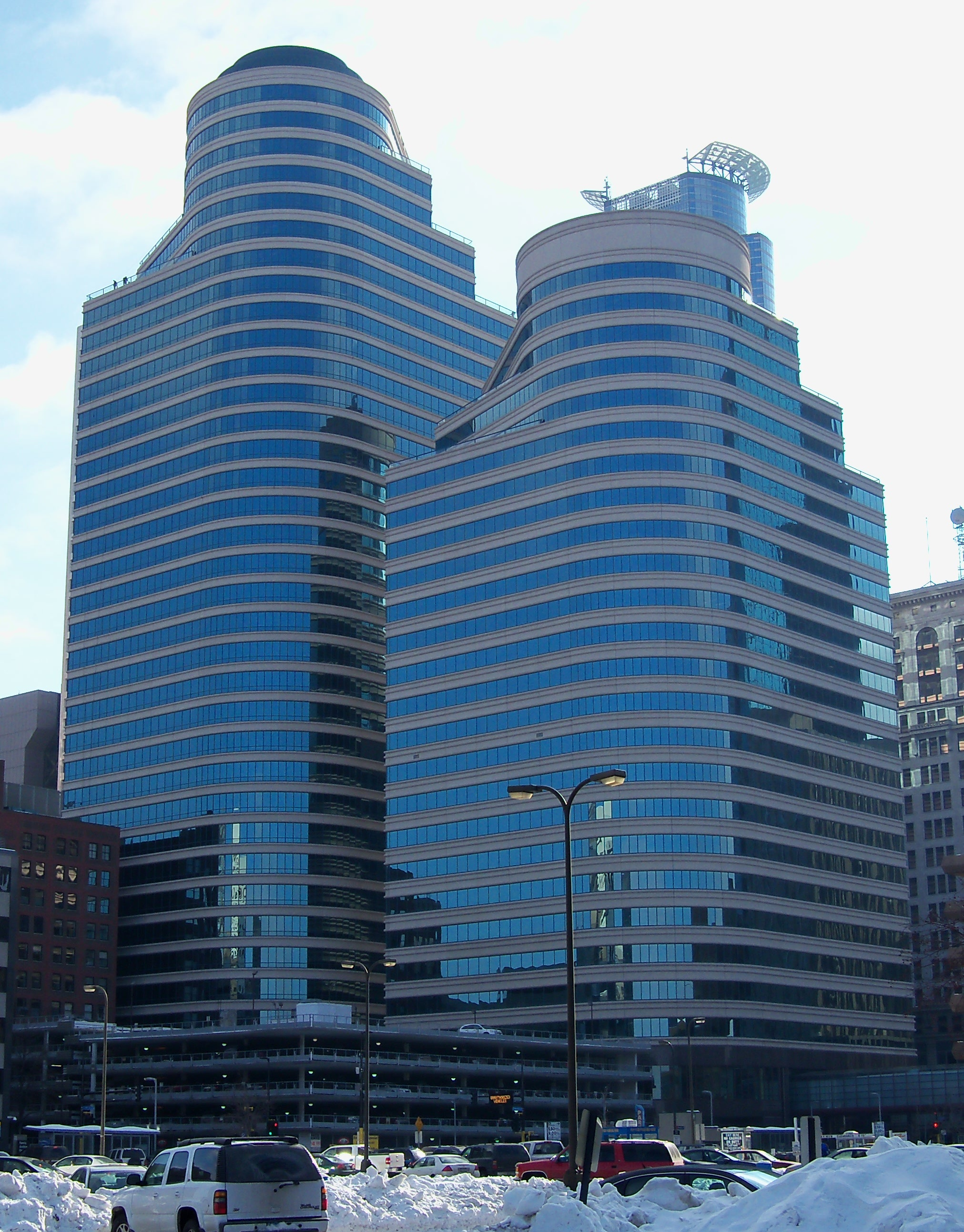
The Fifth Street Towers

Disciplined Growth Investors, Inc. (DGI) is a SEC-registered independent asset management firm founded in February 1997 by Fred Martin in Minneapolis, Minnesota. Its headquarters are located on the 25th floor of the Fifth Street Towers in downtown Minneapolis.

In 2009, DGI had 145 clients. This included private individuals as well as institutions.

Disciplined Growth Investors offers two equity portfolios to its clients: small-cap and mid-cap growth portfolios. DGI also offers a balanced portfolio which is a combination of the mid-cap growth portfolio and fixed-income securities. Disciplined Growth Investors employs a value investing approach applied to growth stocks and is an active participant with its rights as a shareholder and an open critic in regards to high CEO compensation. Disciplined Growth Investors also manages the Disciplined Growth Investors Fund (DGIFX).

Disciplined Growth Investors was founded with $0.7 billion in assets under management (AUM). In 2009, the firm’s AUM was $5.1 billion. Focus Consulting Group identified Disciplined Growth Investors as one of its six "Thriver" firms that performed exceptionally well during the late-2000s recession, throughout which DGI remained optimistic about small to mid-cap investment opportunities. In 2011, the DGI's investment team published a book highlighting growth stock strategies based on the principles of Benjamin Graham.
