= University of St. Thomas (Minnesota) =

Catholic university in Minnesota, US

- Former name: College of St. Thomas (1885–1990)
- Motto: Non Aliam Nisi Te (Latin for 'None Other but You')
- Type: Private university
- Established: 1885; 141 years ago
- Founder: John Ireland
- Accreditation: Higher Learning Commission
- Religious affiliation: Catholic Church (Archdiocese of Saint Paul and Minneapolis)
- Academic affiliations: ACCU; ICUSTA; NAICU; ACTC; Space-grant
- Endowment: $788.4 million (FY2025)
- President: Rob Vischer
- Provost: Eddy M. Rojas
- Academic staff: 704
- Administrative staff: 1,041
- Students: 9,445 (fall 2024)
- Undergraduates: 6,305 (fall 2024)
- Postgraduates: 3,140 (fall 2024)
- Location: St. Paul–Minneapolis, Minnesota, United States; 44°56′35″N 93°11′25″W
- Campus: 78 acres (32 ha); Urban
- Colors: Purple and Gray
- Nickname: Tommies
- Sporting affiliations: NCAA Division I FCS – Pioneer Football League; Summit League; NCHC; WCHA
- Mascot: Tommie the Tomcat
- Website: www.stthomas.edu

The University of St. Thomas (also known as UST, simply St. Thomas, or University of St. Thomas, Minnesota) is a private Catholic research university with campuses in Minneapolis and Saint Paul, Minnesota, United States. Founded in 1885 by Archbishop John Ireland as a Catholic seminary, it is named after Thomas Aquinas, the medieval Catholic theologian, philosopher, and patron saint of students. As of 2025, the university enrolled over 9,000 undergraduate and graduate students across its campuses and was Minnesota's largest private university.

The University of St. Thomas is accredited by the Higher Learning Commission and has nine schools and colleges. These include the College of Arts and Sciences; College of Engineering; School of Education; Morrison Family College of Health; Dougherty Family College, which provides associate degree programs; School of Entrepreneurship; Opus College of Business; and the School of Law. St. Thomas is also home to two seminary programs: the Saint Paul Seminary, a Catholic major seminary and divinity school, and the undergraduate Saint John Vianney Seminary. Both are affiliated with the university and the Archdiocese of Saint Paul and Minneapolis.

== History ==
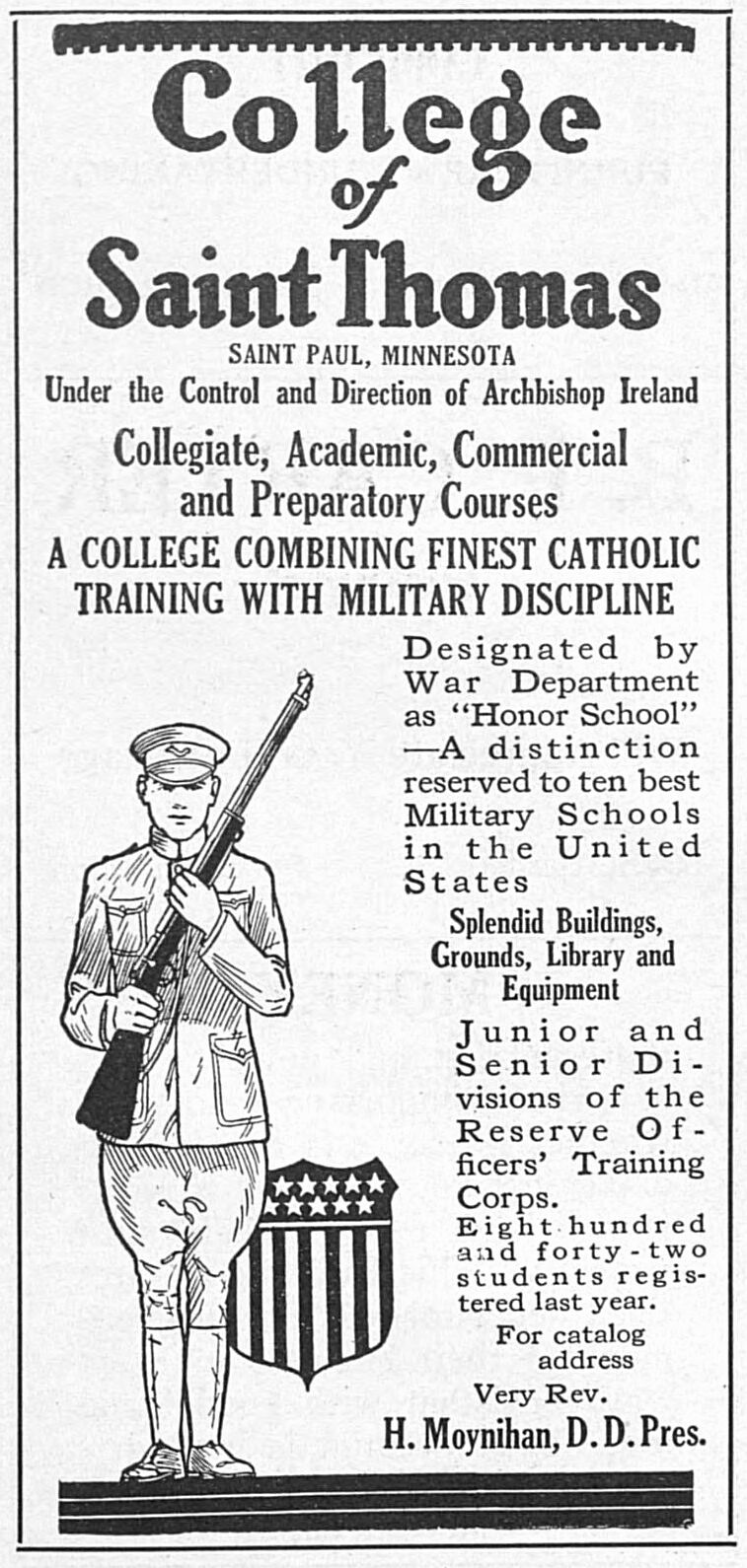
College of Saint Thomas advertisement, 1918, highlights military training

=== Early history ===
Founded in 1885 by John Ireland, then archbishop of Saint Paul and Minneapolis, St. Thomas began as an all-male Catholic seminary. In 1894, the liberal arts program became an independent college through a gift from local railroad tycoon James J. Hill, who provided funds to establish the Saint Paul Seminary apart from the college.

=== Expansion ===
In 1903, the College of St. Thomas established a military program on campus, and it was officially termed a military school by the U.S. War Department in 1906. Initially, the school gave out two-year diplomas in commercial and classical programs before awarding its first academic degrees in 1915. In the years before World War I, the commandant of cadets and professor of military science was Robert I. Rees, who attained the rank of brigadier general during the war and was later an executive at AT&T. In 1922, military training became optional.

From the late 1920s through the mid-1930s, the Holy Cross Fathers, who run the University of Notre Dame, controlled the college's administration. The diocese called them in to help with the school's financial problems; they were known as a crisis intervention team of sorts for parochial schools of the time.

During World War II, St. Thomas served as a training base for naval officers, which kept the school open when men who would have attended college were fighting in the war. Also during this period, Japanese American students in concentration camps were invited to study at St. Thomas.After the war, in 1948, the college established "Tom Town" on the eastern end of the lower quadrant, now the site of the O'Shaughnessey-Frey Library and O'Shaughnessey Education Center. Tom Town, made of 20 double-dwelling huts, consisted of white, barracks-like housing units for faculty, students, and their families. The units helped meet housing demand after World War II.

=== Diversification ===
In the latter half of the 20th century, St. Thomas started two of its most notable graduate programs, education in 1950 and business administration in 1974. The school became co-educational in 1977, and although women were not allowed to enroll until then, female students from St. Catherine University (then the College of St. Catherine) often took classes at St. Thomas. Women were also present as instructors and administrators on campus, but the staff, faculty, and administration have seen a vast increase in female employment since the move to co-education. In 1990, the College of St. Thomas became the University of St. Thomas and in 1991, the university opened the Minneapolis campus. In 2001, St. Thomas reinstated its School of Law at its Minneapolis campus; it had been shut down during the Great Depression. U.S. Supreme Court Justice Antonin Scalia was the speaker at the grand opening.

== Campuses ==
=== Saint Paul ===
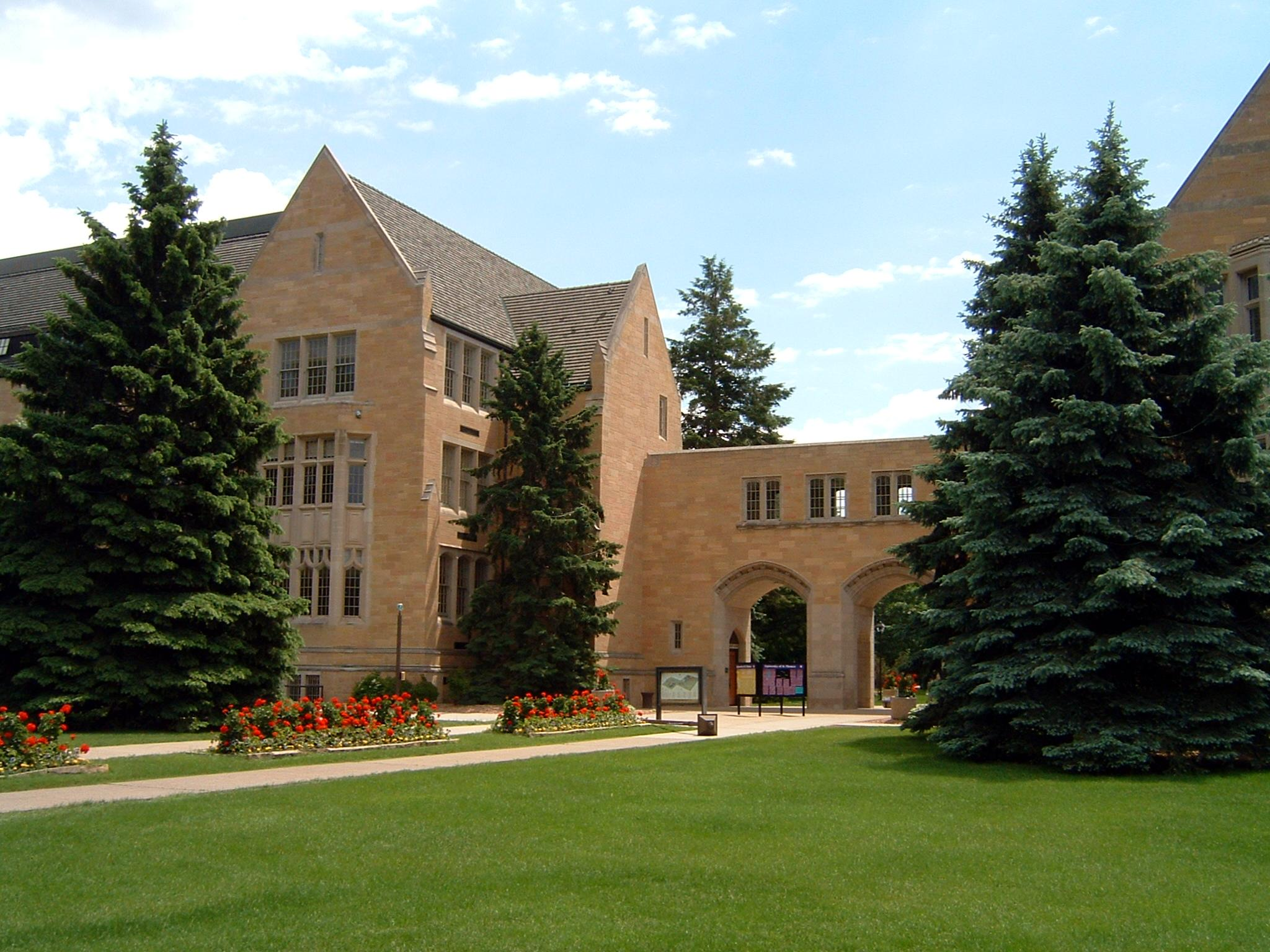
Arched entryway to the St. Paul campus

The St. Paul campus is the main campus and is home to most undergraduate students. The main campus, built on a farm site once considered "far removed from town", is a few blocks east of the Mississippi River on Summit Avenue. The site was farmed by ex-Fort Snelling soldier William Finn, who received the property as a pension settlement after he accidentally shot himself in the hand while on guard duty.

The western edge of the campus borders Mississippi Gorge Regional Park. Summit Avenue, which runs through the middle of the campus, is the country's longest span of Victorian homes. This tree-lined avenue includes the Governor's Mansion, F. Scott Fitzgerald's townhome, and James J. Hill's mansion.

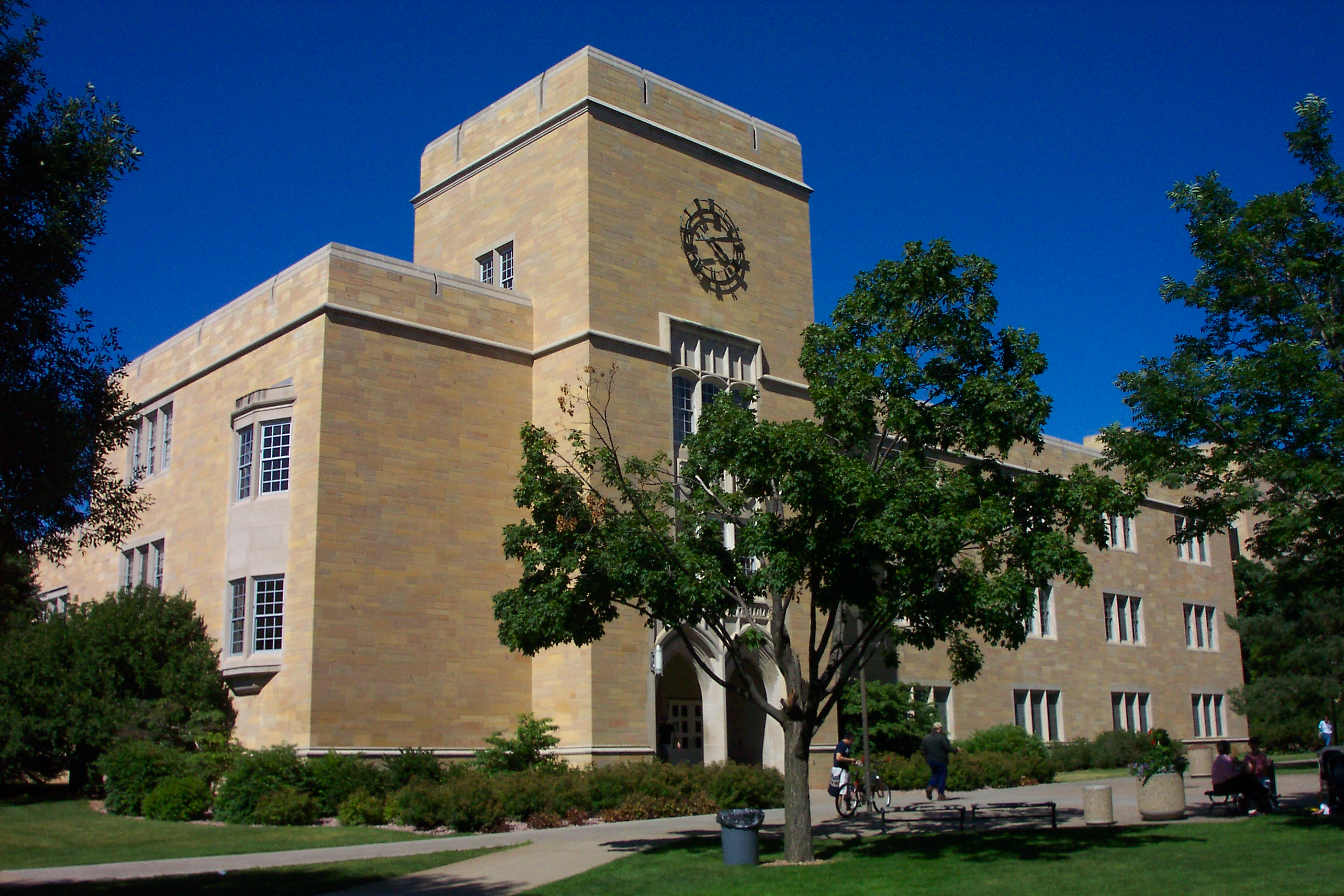
Murray-Herrick Center

In 2005, a new apartment-style residence hall was built on an existing parking lot. McNeely Hall, built in 2006, is a large classroom building for business that replaced a smaller building of the same name.

In 2012, St. Thomas completed the final stage of its three-building expansion on the St. Paul campus. The two main additions are the Anderson Athletic and Recreation Center (AARC) and the Anderson Student Center. They were completed in the summer of 2010 and January 2012, respectively. The AARC has a field house, basketball arena, weight room, and swimming pool. The field house is home to the MIAC conference's most dominant track team. The Anderson Student Center is home to new food venues and entertainment options, including a game room, bowling alley, and coffee shop. The American Museum of Asmat Art is on the second floor.

St Thomas's newest dormitories, Frey Residence Hall and Schoenecker North Residence Hall, opened in 2020. Frey is a five-story facility that houses 260 second-year and transfer students. Tommie North is also a 5-story facility, houses 480 residents, and has a 116-stall underground parking garage. It is connected by tunnel to the Iverson Center for Faith and Ireland Hall and sits on the site of the former John Paul II dormitory.

In 2021, St. Thomas moved forward with plans for a new $110 million, 130,000 square foot building on South Campus called Schoenecker Center. A dedication ceremony for it was held on May 8, 2024. The new facility will focus on STEAM fields. The 126-year-old Loras Hall, most recently used as an administrative building, was demolished to make way for Schoenecker Center.

In 2023, the university announced plans for a $175 million on-campus indoor arena known as Lee and Penny Anderson Arena. The 6,000-seat arena will be the home of the basketball and hockey teams and host other events, such as commencement. Cretin Hall, McCarthy Gymnasium, and the Service Center are to be demolished to make way for the arena.

In 2024, the university officially opened the Schoenecker Center on its St. Paul campus. The $110 million, 130,000-square-foot facility acts as a central hub for STEAM education, uniquely housing interdisciplinary programs spanning the arts, engineering, and sciences.

=== Minneapolis ===
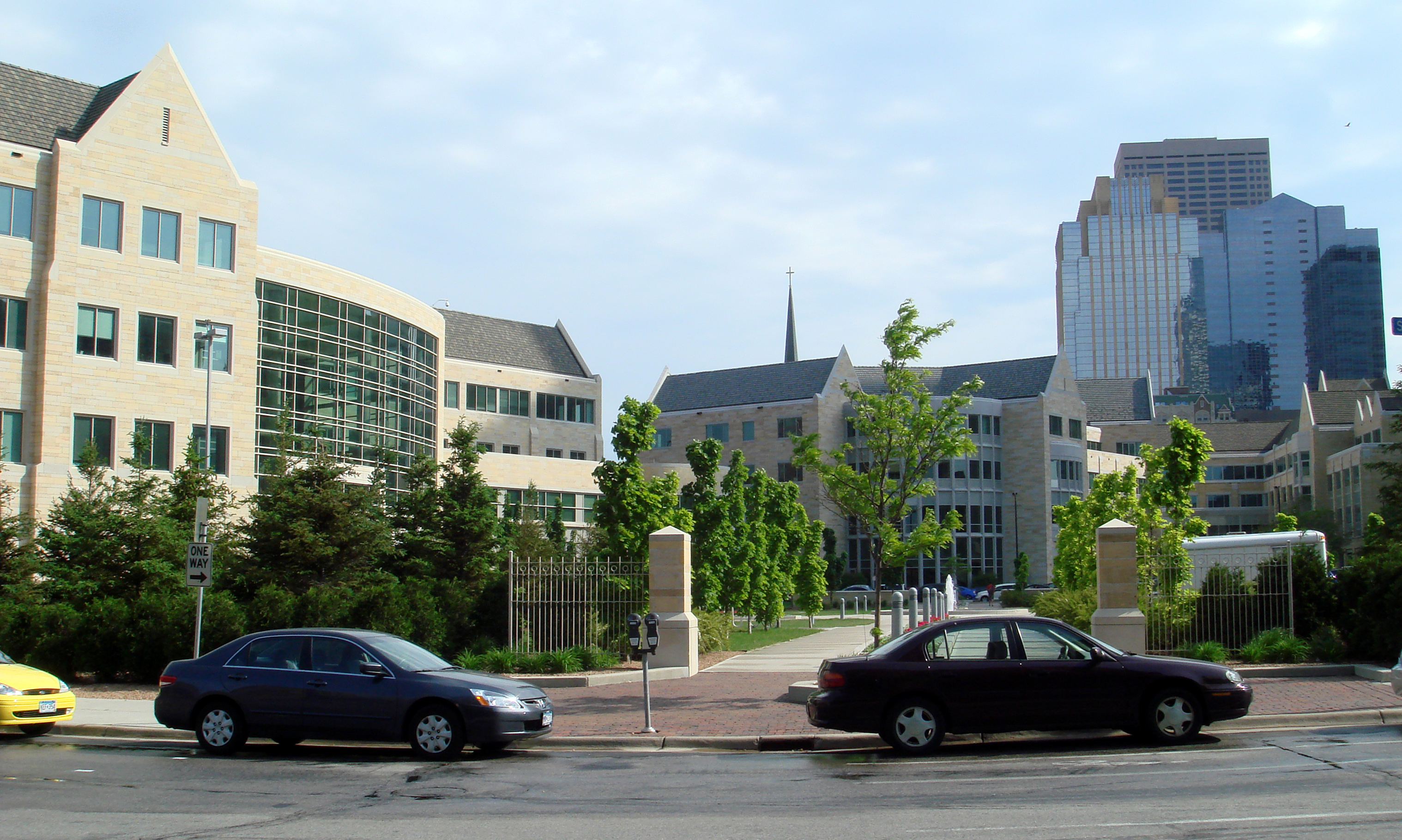
Downtown Minneapolis Campus

In fall 1992, the university opened a permanent 150,000 sq ft (14,000 m^{2}) campus at 1000 LaSalle Ave. in Minneapolis. The first building, named Terrence Murphy Hall in 2000, is headquarters to the university's Opus College of Business. Artist Mark Balma created one of the largest frescoes in the United States on the arched ceiling of its atrium. The seven-panel, 1,904 square feet (176.9 m^{2}) fresco was completed in 1994 and portrays the seven virtues discussed in the writings of St. Thomas Aquinas. The Minneapolis campus also holds St. Thomas's School of Education, the School of Law, and the Schulze School of Entrepreneurship.

=== Daniel C. Gainey Conference Center (Owatonna) ===
As announced on May 15, 2014, the Daniel C. Gainey Conference Center was to be sold to Meridian Behavioral Health, LLC, with a plan to convert it to a treatment facility for addiction and behavioral disorders. The deal closed in August 2014. The deal included the entire 180-acre property and all the buildings except the Winton Guest House, which was designed by architect Frank Gehry. St. Thomas then sold the house at auction and it was moved from the site.

=== Bernardi (Rome) ===
Since 1999, the University of St. Thomas has been the only U.S. university to have a formal affiliation with the Pontifical University of St. Thomas Aquinas (Angelicum).

== Academics ==
Academic rankings

National
- Forbes: 194
- U.S. News & World Report: 148
- Washington Monthly: 201
- WSJ/College Pulse: 301

Each year, the university awards almost 2,500 degrees, including five different bachelor's degrees (B.A., B.M., B.S., B.S.M.E., and B.S.E.E.). It has 88 major fields at the undergraduate level, with 59 minor fields of study and seven preprofessional programs. At the graduate and professional level, the university offers 41 master's degrees, 2 education specialist degrees, 1 juris doctor, and 5 doctorates.

The University of St. Thomas is a member of the Associated Colleges of the Twin Cities (ACTC), a consortium of five private liberal arts colleges. This program allows students to take classes at one of the associated colleges for no additional cost. Other schools include Hamline University, St. Catherine University, Macalester College, and Augsburg University.

=== Schools and colleges ===
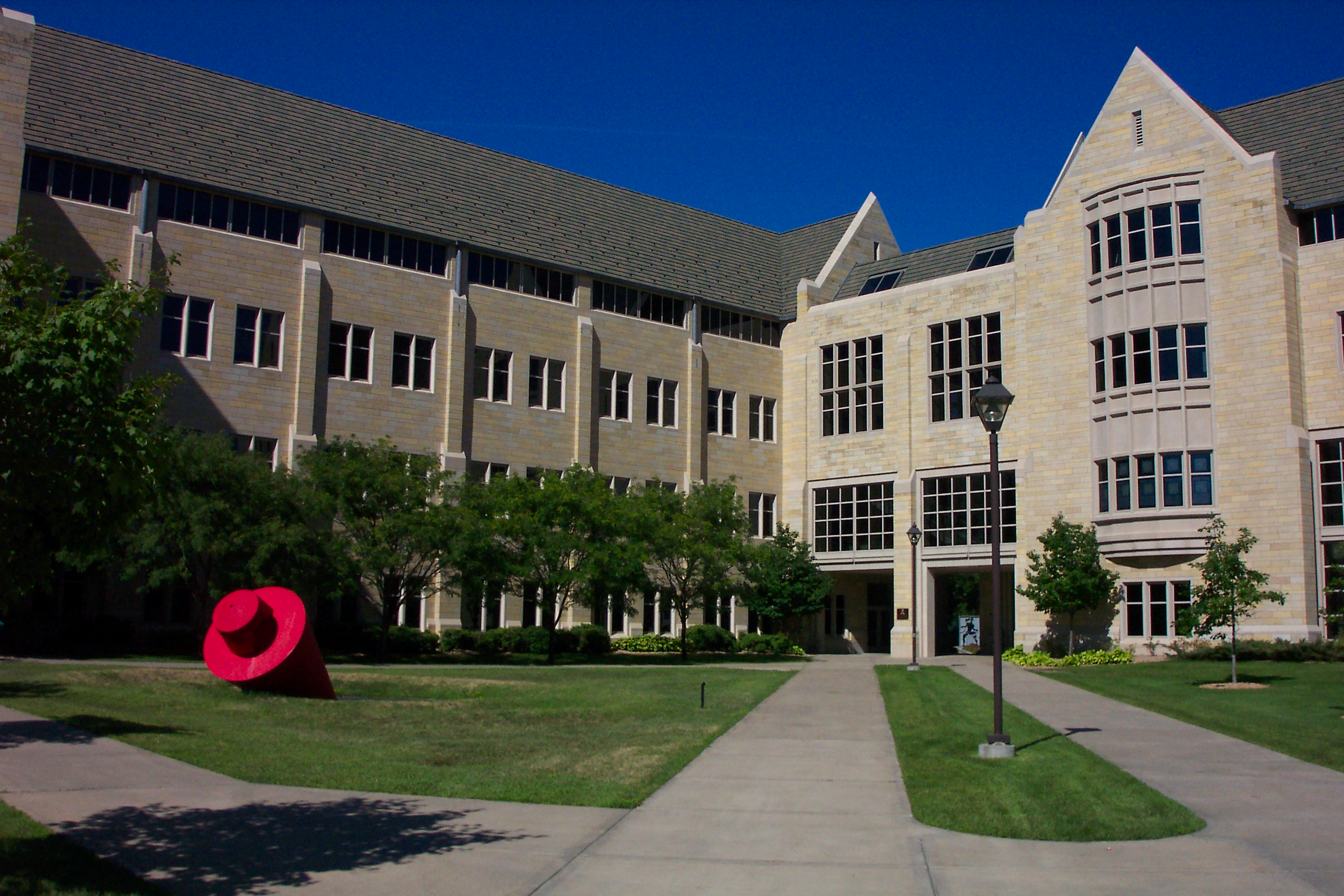
Frey Science and Engineering Center

The university offers its degree programs through nine divisions. The College of Arts and Sciences includes undergraduate departments in the arts, humanities, natural sciences, and social sciences, plus a number of interdisciplinary programs. The Opus College of Business has seven departments offering graduate and undergraduate curricula including Executive Education and Professional Development at University of St. Thomas, and is one of six AACSB accredited business schools in Minnesota. St. Thomas also houses the Saint Paul Seminary School of Divinity, which offers master's- and doctoral-level degrees oriented to theological study and the practice of ministry. Saint John Vianney Seminary, a minor college seminary, is also at St. Thomas. Other schools include the School of Education, the School of Engineering, and the School of Social Work. The Master of Social Work is offered as a double degree program with the St. Catherine University.

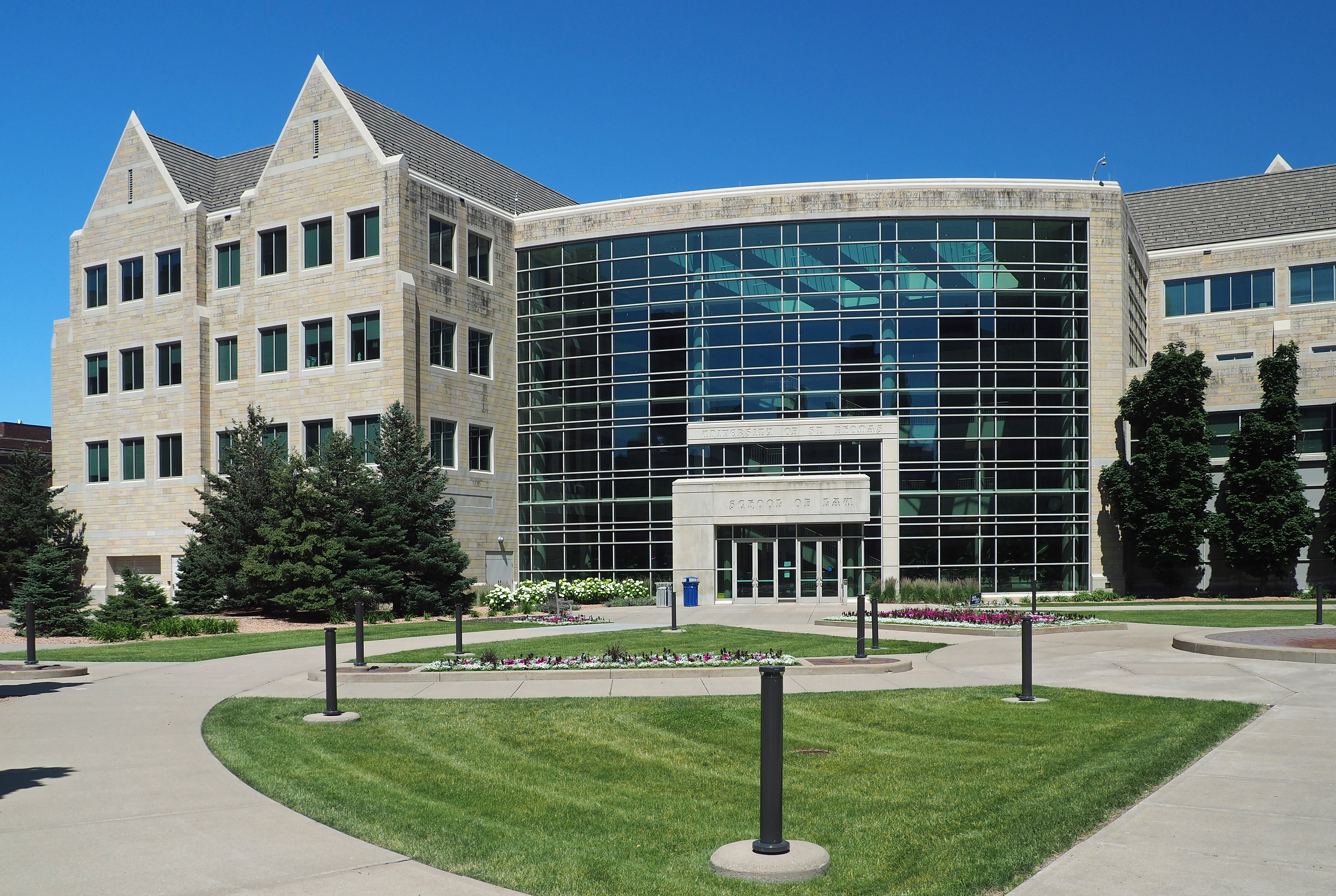
School of Law

Schools housed on the Minneapolis campus include the Graduate School of Professional Psychology, Undergraduate and Graduate Schools of Education, Graduate Programs in Software Engineering, and the School of Law, which was re-opened in 1999 after a 66-year hiatus.

== Athletics ==
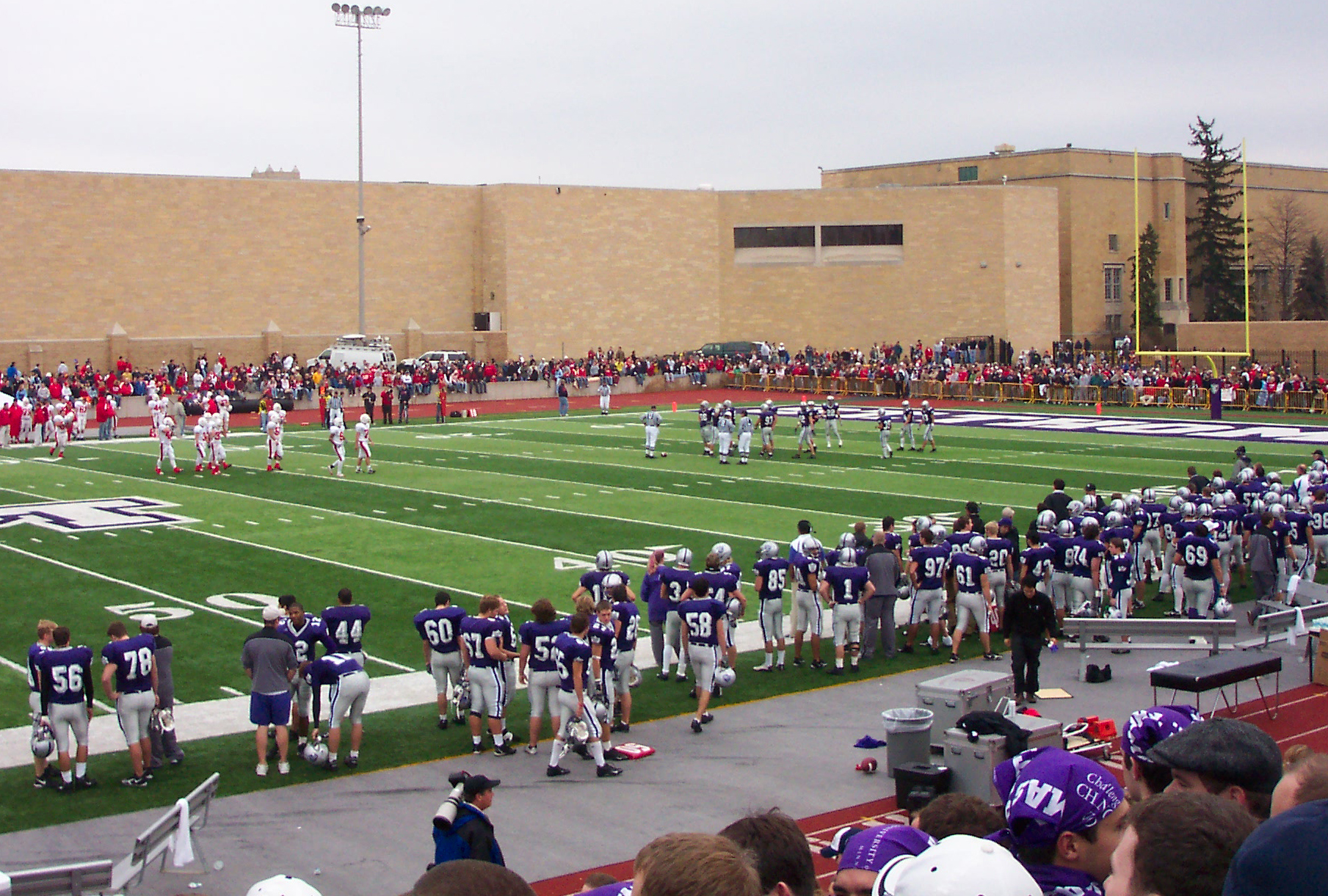
Tommie/Johnnie football in 2005

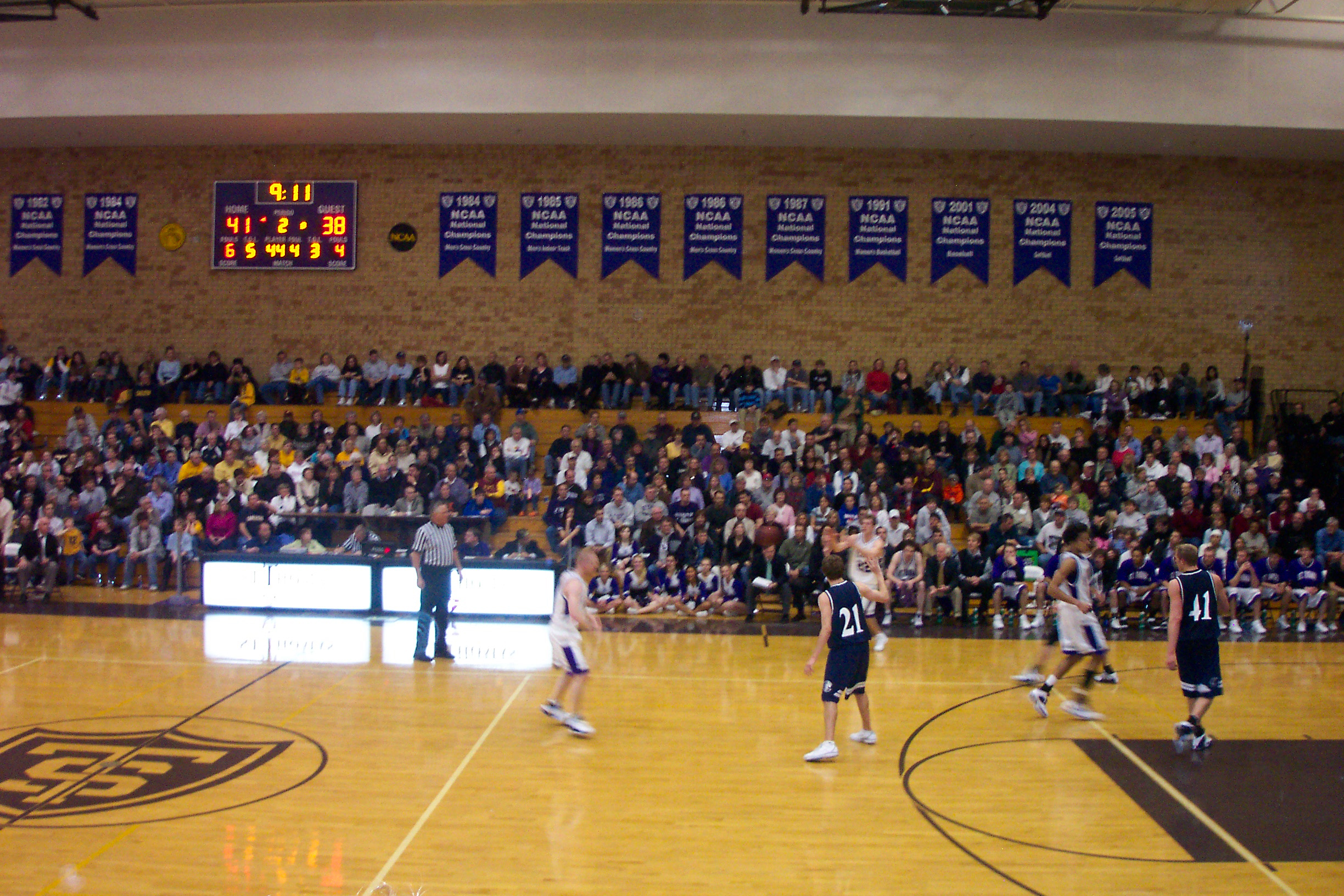
MIAC Basketball Finals versus Carleton in 2006

St. Thomas's school colors are purple and gray, and the athletic teams are called the Tommies. The mascot for these teams is "Tommie". "Tommy" was changed to the "ie" spelling when women were accepted as full-time students, to be more inclusive.

For most of its athletic history, St. Thomas was a member of the Minnesota Intercollegiate Athletic Conference (MIAC), which competes at the NCAA Division III level. Since 1885, athletics have been present on St. Thomas' campus. The first sports teams that became popular were intramural. The top intramural baseball teams in the 1890s were the "Blues" and "Grays", which is where the school colors come from. Varsity sports did not begin until 1904, and UST was a founding member of the MIAC in 1920. St. Thomas celebrated its 100th year of varsity athletics in 2003–2004.

St. Thomas' longtime archrival was Saint John's University from Collegeville, Minnesota. Recent national titles include men's basketball in 2011 and 2016; men's baseball in 2009 and 2001; women's softball in 2005 and 2004; men's lacrosse (MCLA Division II) in 2019, 2016, 2013, 2012, 2010 and 2009; women's volleyball in 2012; and dance team in 2017, 2016, 2015, 2014, 2013, 2012, 2011, 2010, 2008 and 2006. St. Thomas also won national championships with women's basketball in 1991; men's cross country in 1986 and 1984; men's indoor track in 1985; and women's cross country in 1987, 1986, 1984 and 1982. In 2012, St. Thomas played for the first time in the Stagg Bowl in Salem, Virginia, which is the Division III Football National Championship game, against the University of Mount Union, losing 28–10. In 2015, St. Thomas reached the Stagg Bowl for the second time, prompting another championship match against Mount Union. St. Thomas ultimately ended up losing the game, with a final score of 49–35.

WCCO has broadcast radio coverage of Tommies football games since 2011.

On May 22, 2019, it was announced that St. Thomas was "involuntarily removed" from the MIAC. St. Thomas was to have been allowed to remain as a member of the conference until the spring of 2021 while they searched for a new conference had that become necessary but would be allowed to leave at an earlier date should a new conference accept them prior to spring 2021 or should they have decided to become an independent. On October 4, 2019, St. Thomas announced that it had been invited to the Summit League, an NCAA Division I conference. This announcement also noted that St. Thomas had applied for a waiver from the NCAA to move directly from Division III to Division I beginning with the 2021–22 season. While the process of transitioning from Division III to Division I normally takes 12 years and requires transitioning through Division II, on July 15, 2020, the NCAA announced they had approved St. Thomas's application to move directly to Division I. As the Summit League does not sponsor football or ice hockey, St. Thomas joined the Pioneer Football League for football, the CCHA for men's hockey and the WCHA for women's hockey. Starting in the 2026–2027 season, St. Thomas will join the NCHC for men's hockey.

== Student life ==
Student body composition as of May 2, 2022
Race and ethnicity	Total
White	74%
Other (Note: Other consists of Multiracial Americans & those who prefer to not say.)	8%
Hispanic	7%
Asian	5%
Black	4%
Foreign national	3%
Economic diversity
Low-income (Note: The percentage of students who received an income-based federal Pell grant intended for low-income students.)	22%
Affluent (Note: The percentage of students who are a part of the American middle class at the bare minimum.)	78%

=== Student housing ===
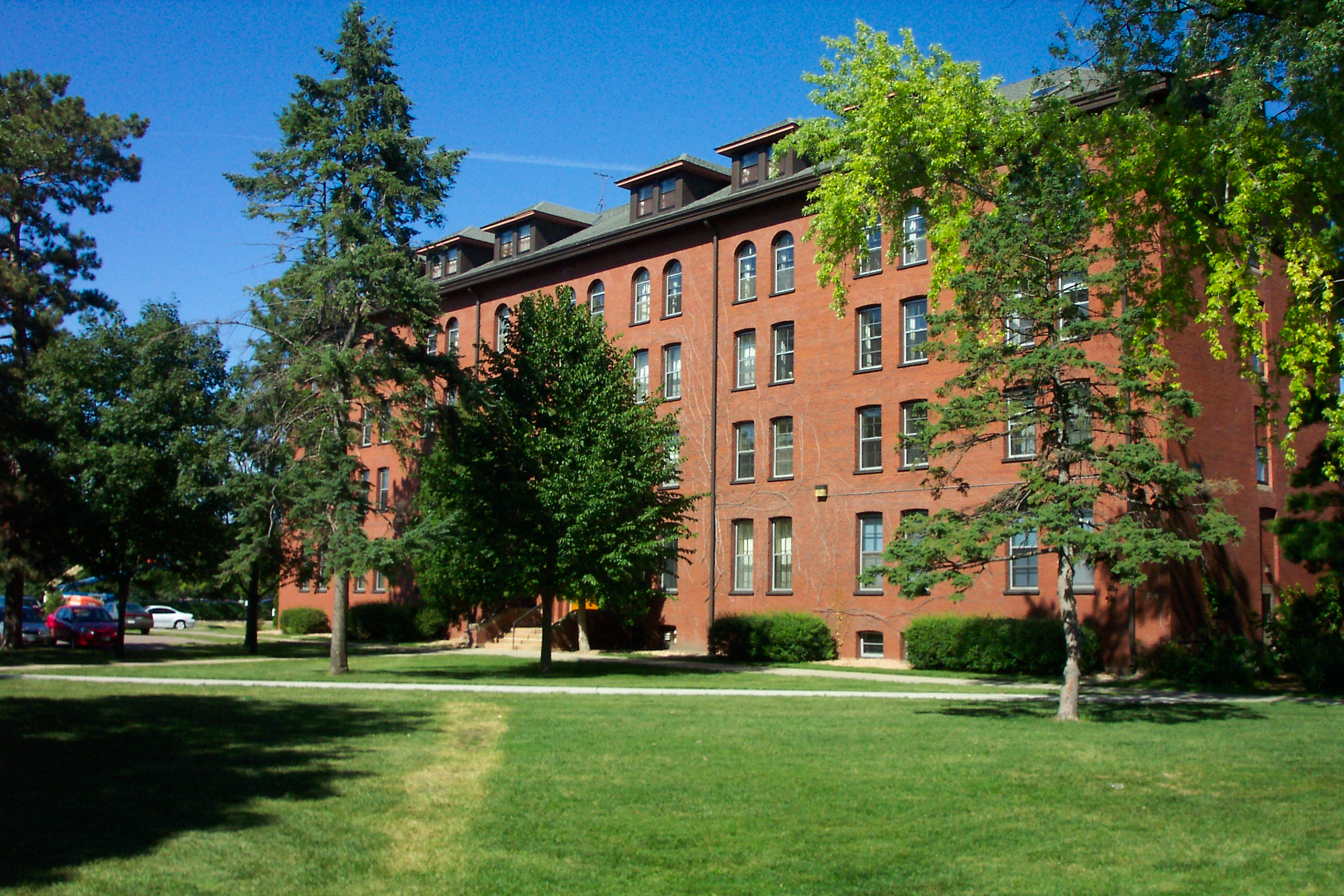
Cretin Hall, built in 1894

Undergraduate housing is on the St. Paul Campus. About 2,400 residents live in 10 traditional halls and apartments. Additionally, St. John Vianney College Seminary holds approximately 140 students. All residence halls are co-ed. Residence halls on campus are named after Archbishops of St. Paul-Minneapolis, such as William O. Brady, Austin Dowling, and John Ireland. Built in 1894, Cretin Hall is the oldest hall on campus and was designed (along with Loras and Grace halls) by Emmanuel Louis Masqueray.

The department of residence life has purchased additional buildings on what it calls "mid-campus", between Grand and Summit Avenues. These buildings house men and women transfer students in one of two buildings. There are two apartment complexes specifically designed for sophomores. Students are also housed in the residence above the Center for Well-Being.

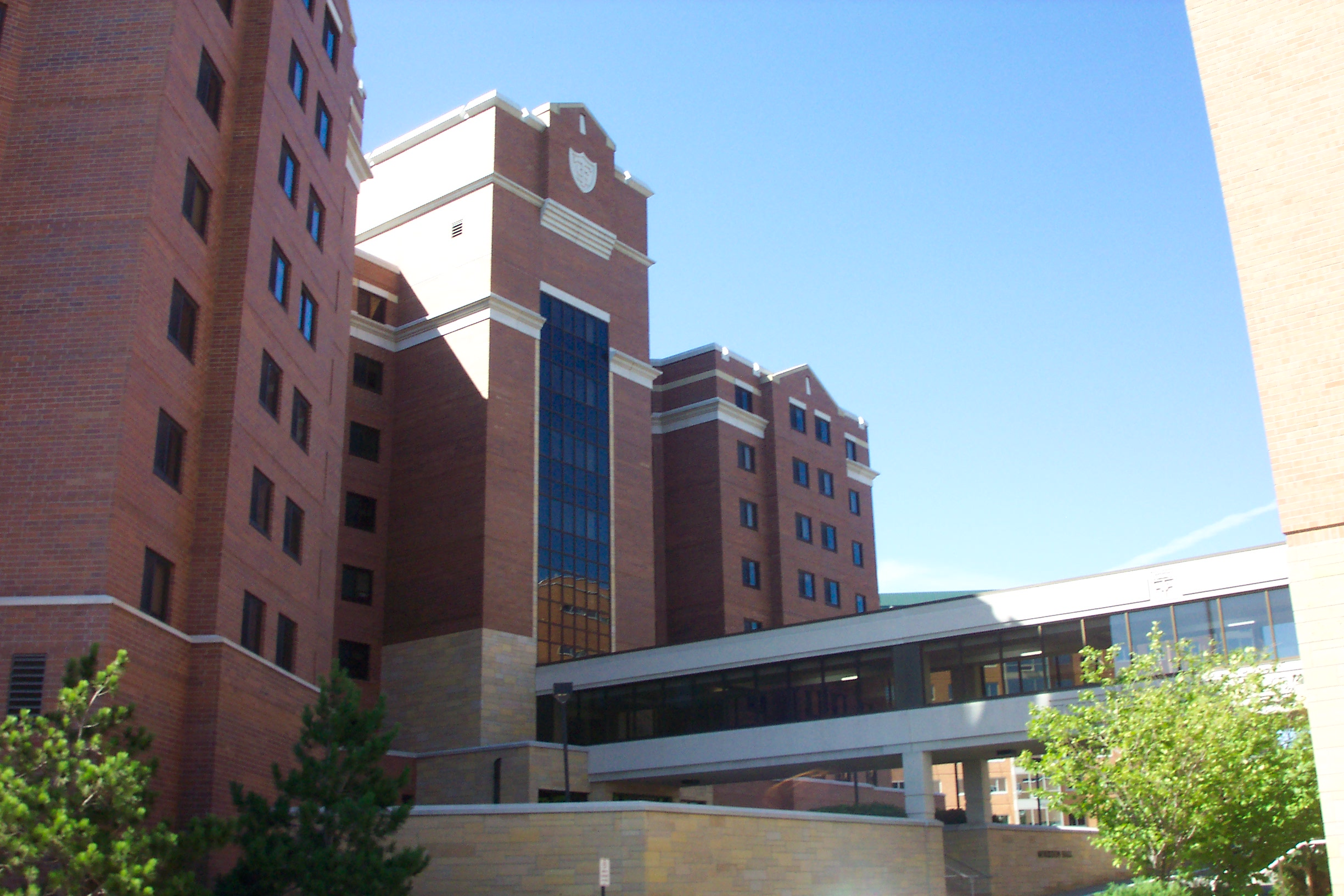
Morrison Hall is connected to Koch Commons with a skyway.

The University of St. Thomas offers special-interest floors, floors intended to house residents with similar interests or class standing. Almost a third of all floors are First Year Experience floors, which consist of only freshmen. This practice attempts to create a cohesive community by placing students together who will have a similar experience. First-year students have the opportunity to participate in Living Learning Communities (LLCs). These include Sustainability, Aquinas Scholars, Tommies Do Well(ness), Pathways to Engineering, eMedia, Bridging Divides, Catholic Studies, Major Explorers, and Business for the Common Good.

== Coat of arms ==
The college's arms were designed in 1958 by William F. J. Ryan. Several simplified logos based on the arms have been created and used by the university, most recently in 2016.

Coat of arms of University of St. Thomas
Adopted 1958 Crest An open book Proper, the pages inscribed Non Aliam Nisi Te Torse Argent and Purpure Escutcheon Purpure a cross fillet argent surmounted of a sun, on a chief castellated barry wavy of eight azure and of the first between two crosses patonce a sword inverted all gules Symbolism The upper section of the arms are from the arms of the Archdiocese of Saint Paul and Minneapolis. The main partition is divided by a silver cross, symbolizing the purpose of the college to imbue the "hearts of her students with the living message of Christ." A sun rayonnant represents Aquinas. The embattled division symbolizes Fort Snelling, and the former status of the university as a military college. The book, atop a wreath of the college colors, contains the words of Thomas Aquinas, Non Aliam Nisi Te, or "None other but You".

== Notable faculty and staff ==
- John Abraham – professor in the School of Engineering
- Michael Murphy Andregg – geneticist and peace activist
- Archbishop William Brady
- Don J. Briel – Professor of Catholic Studies
- Glenn Caruso – head football coach
- Andrew H. Cozzens – professor of divinity
- Robert Delahunty – internationally recognized professor of law
- David Durenberger – U.S. senator from Minnesota
- Massimo Faggioli – theology professor
- Michael Joncas - professor of Catholic studies
- Ellen J. Kennedy – genocide scholar
- John Jeremiah Lawler – professor of divinity
- Nekima Levy-Pounds – president of the Minneapolis NAACP
- Whitney MacMillan – former chairman of the board and chief executive officer of Cargill
- Eugene McCarthy – U.S. senator and representative
- Eoin McKiernan – early scholar in Irish studies
- Harry Mehre – football and basketball coach
- Thomas Mengler – Dean of the School of Law
- Larry Miggins – baseball coach
- Leslie Adrienne Miller – poet
- Charles Morerod – Director of the Rome Program in Catholic Studies
- Rachel Paulose – Visiting professor of Law
- Mary Rose O'Reilley – poet
- Mark Osler – Professor of Law
- Bishop Lee A. Piché – theology
- David Renz – Professor of Public Policy
- John A. Ryan – moral theologian
- Patrick J. Schiltz – U.S. federal judge
- Katarina Schuth – Professor for the Social Scientific Study of Religion
- Brandon Staley - Head Coach of the Los Angeles Chargers
- David Strom – Professor of Political Philosophy
- William B. Tolman – Dean, College of Arts and Sciences and chemist
- Peter Vaill – Professor of Management

== Notable alumni ==
=== Academia and education ===
- Tim Callahan – geologist
- Dennis Dease – former president of the University of St. Thomas
- Richard DeMillo – computer scientist
- Mark Dienhart – educator
- Tom Dooher – president of Education Minnesota
- Abraham Kaplan – philosopher
- Rick Krueger – educator
- Stephen A. McCarthy – director of the Cornell University libraries
- John A. Ryan – theologian
- Edward J. Walsh – journalist

=== Arts and entertainment ===
- Felix Biederman – writer, gamer, co-host of Chapo Trap House
- Larry Bond – game designer and author
- Dottie Cannon – Miss Minnesota USA 2006
- Vince Flynn – author
- T. R. Knight – actor
- Glenn Lindgren – TV chef and food writer
- T.D. Mischke – radio talk show host
- Evan Schwartz – author
- Ali Selim – film director
- Joe Soucheray – radio talk show host
- John Vachon – photographer

=== Athletics ===
- Brady Beeson – professional football player
- Jim Brandt – professional football player
- Herb Franta – professional football player
- Courtney George – professional curler
- Tommy Gibbons – Hall of Fame boxer, sheriff of Ramsey County, Minnesota 1934–1959
- Neal Guggemos – professional football player
- Red Hardy – professional baseball player
- Walt Kiesling – professional football player and coach, member of the Pro Football Hall of Fame
- John Kundla – first coach for the Minneapolis Lakers
- Horace LaBissoniere – professional football player
- Jake Mauer – professional baseball player and coach
- Chuck Reichow – professional football player
- Isaac Rosefelt – American-Israeli basketball player
- Don Simensen – football player
- Larry Steinbach – football player
- Roy Vassau – professional football player
- Joe Warren – professional soccer player

=== Business and leadership ===
- Ben Anderson – entrepreneur
- Robert Buss – managing director, Disciplined Growth Investors
- Jack Casey – business professional
- Ron Fowler – owner, San Diego Padres
- John Schneider – general manager of the Seattle Seahawks
- Bob Short – businessman, sport teams owner and politician
- Ann Winblad – venture capitalist

=== Law, politics, government, and military ===
- Semhar Araia – social activist
- James N. Azim Jr. – Wisconsin State Assemblyman
- Mike Beard – member, Minnesota House of Representatives
- William V. Belanger Jr. – Minnesota State Senator
- Michelle Benson – Minnesota State Senator
- David H. Bieter – mayor of Boise, Idaho
- John E. Boland – member, Minnesota House of Representatives
- Stephen F. Burkard – attorney
- Michael Ciresi – attorney
- Ted Daley – Minnesota State Senator
- Gary DeCramer – Minnesota State Senator
- Terry Dempsey – member, Minnesota House of Representatives
- Zach Duckworth – Minnesota State Senator
- Joe Dunn – California State Senator
- Scott Dibble – Minnesota State Senator
- Sondra Erickson – member, Minnesota House of Representatives
- Peter Fischer – member, Minnesota House of Representatives
- Robert Farnsworth – Minnesota State Senator
- Burke Harr – Nebraska State Senator
- John Harrington – chief of metro transit police in Minneapolis/St. Paul
- Brian H. Hook – former Assistant Secretary of State for International Organization Affairs
- Tad Jude – former Judge of the Minnesota 10th Judicial District
- Paul Kohls – member, Minnesota House of Representatives
- Charles B. Kornmann – United States federal judge
- Emily Koski – member, Minneapolis City Council
- Arthur Lenroot Jr. – Wisconsin State Senator
- Patrick Lucey – Governor of Wisconsin
- Mike McFadden – 2014 Republican candidate for U.S. Senate from Minnesota
- Pam Myhra – member, Minnesota House of Representatives
- Jim Oberstar – former U.S. Congressman for Minnesota's 8th district
- James Hugh O'Neill – brigadier general, U.S. Army
- Eric Pratt – Minnesota State Senator
- Cindy Pugh – member, Minnesota House of Representatives
- Erin Maye Quade – Minnesota State Senator
- Patrick J. Ryan – chief of chaplains of the U.S. Army
- Henry Timothy ("Tim") Vakoc – first U.S. military chaplain to die from wounds received in the Iraq War
- Conrado Vega – Minnesota State Senator
- Robin Wonsley – member, Minneapolis City Council
- D.D. Wozniak – former chief judge of the Minnesota Court of Appeals

=== Religion ===
- Joseph John Annabring
- William Henry Bullock
- James Joseph Byrne – Archdiocese of Dubuque
- Frederick F. Campbell
- Robert J. Carlson – Archdiocese of St. Louis
- Peter F. Christensen
- Leonard Philip Cowley
- Blase J. Cardinal Cupich – Archdiocese of Chicago
- John Francis Doerfler
- Paul Vincent Dudley
- Paul D. Etienne
- Lawrence Alexander Glenn
- David Haas
- Hilary Baumann Hacker
- Lambert Anthony Hoch
- Edward Howard
- James Keane
- Francis Martin Kelly
- Arthur Kennedy
- John Francis Kinney
- Louis Benedict Kucera
- Raymond W. Lessard
- John M. LeVoir
- Raymond Alphonse Lucker
- Lawrence James McNamara
- John Jeremiah McRaith
- William Theodore Mulloy
- Gerald Francis O'Keefe
- Richard Pates
- Lee A. Piché
- John Roach – Archdiocese of St. Paul and Minneapolis
- Alexander King Sample – Archdiocese of Portland
- Francis Joseph Schenk
- Alphonse James Schladweiler
- Mike Schmitz
- Fulton J. Sheen – titular see of Newport, Wales
- George Henry Speltz
- Rose Thering – social activist
- Sylvester William Treinen
- Nicolas Eugene Walsh
- Thomas Anthony Welch
- Stephen S. Woznicki

=== Other ===
- Dan Buettner – explorer, educator, author
- Daerek "LemonNation" Hart – professional League of Legends player
- Hussein Samatar – politician, banker, and community organizer
- Will Steger – polar explorer

== See also ==
- List of colleges and universities in Minnesota
- Higher education in Minnesota

== Bibliography ==
- Jarchow, Merrill E. (1973). Private liberal arts colleges in Minnesota: their history and contributions. St. Paul: Minnesota Historical Society. ISBN 9780873510813.
- Murphy, Terrence J. (2001). A Catholic university: vision and opportunities. Collegeville: The Order of St. Benedict. ISBN 9780814651018.
