= Lake Johanna (Ramsey County, Minnesota) =

Lake in the state of Minnesota, United States

- Location within Minnesota
- Location: Ramsey County, Minnesota
- Coordinates: 45°2′36″N 93°10′13″W
- Type: lake
- Surface area: 211.91 acres (85.76 ha)
- Average depth: 17 feet (5.2 m)
- Max. depth: 43 feet (13 m)
- Shore length^{1}: 3.02 miles (4.86 km)
- References: https://www.dnr.state.mn.us/lakefind/lake.html?id=62007800
- ^{1} Shore length is not a well-defined measure.

Lake Johanna is a lake in Ramsey County, in the U.S. state of Minnesota.

It was named after Johanna McKenty, an early settler.

Fish species in the lake include black crappie, bluegill, bowfin (dogfish), green sunfish, hybrid sunfish, largemouth bass, northern pike, pumpkinseed, tiger muskellunge, walleye, white sucker, yellow bullhead, yellow perch.

== See also ==
- List of lakes in Minnesota
