= Basilica of St. John (Des Moines, Iowa) =

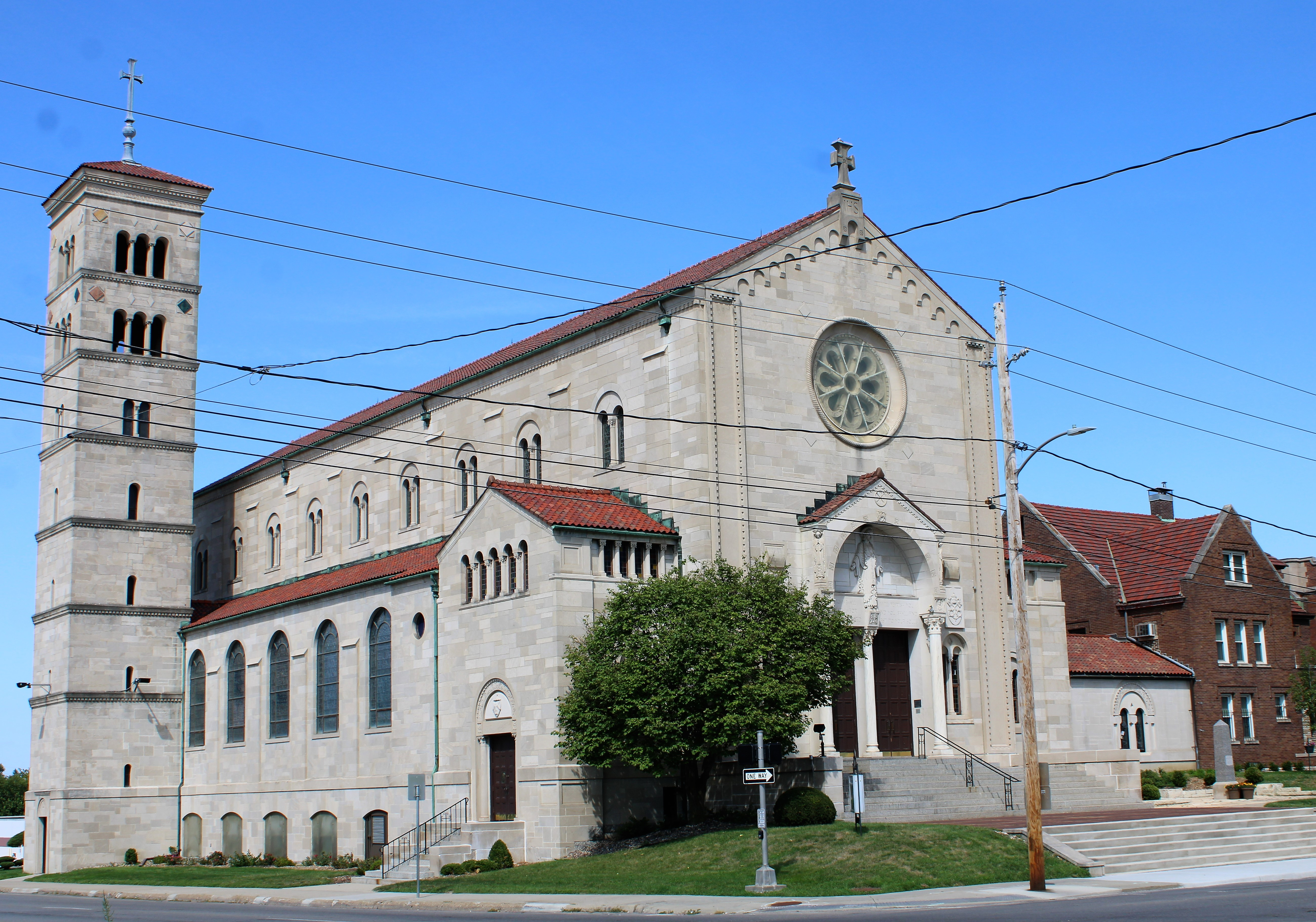
- The Basilica of St. John in 2022
- Basilica of St. John
- Location: 1915 University Ave. Des Moines, Iowa
- Country: United States
- Denomination: Catholic Church
- Website: www.basilicaofstjohn.org

History
- Status: Basilica/Parish
- Founded: 1905
- Dedication: St. John the Evangelist
- Dedicated: December 4, 1927

Architecture
- Functional status: Active
- Architect: Maginnis & Walsh
- Style: Romanesque Revival
- Groundbreaking: 1913
- Completed: 1927

Specifications
- Capacity: 900
- Length: 138 feet (42 m)
- Width: 80 feet (24 m)
- Materials: Indiana limestone

Administration
- Diocese: Des Moines

Clergy
- Bishop: Most Rev. William Joensen
- Pastor: Very Rev. Trevor Chicoine
- Saint John's Roman Catholic Church
- U.S. National Register of Historic Places
- Location within Iowa Location within the United States
- Coordinates: 41°36′2.24″N 93°38′35.94″W
- Area: less than one acre
- NRHP reference No.: 87001497
- Added to NRHP: September 8, 1987

The Basilica of St. John is a Minor Basilica of the Catholic Church in the Drake neighborhood of Des Moines, Iowa, United States. It is also a parish church in the Diocese of Des Moines. The church building is listed on the National Register of Historic Places.

== History ==
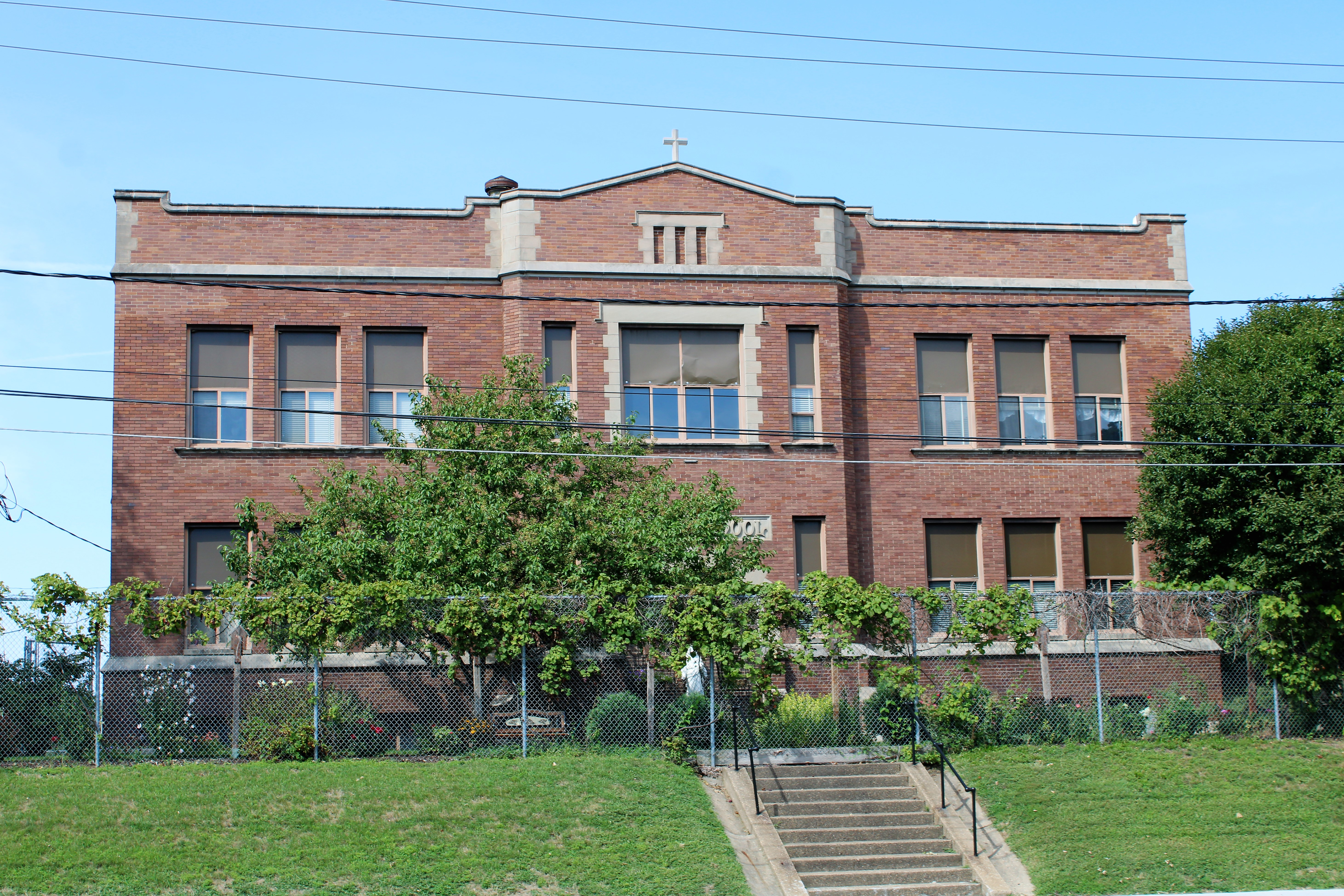
The school was the first parish building.

Bishop Henry Cosgrove of the Diocese of Davenport established St. John's Parish in 1905. Its territory had been taken from St. Ambrose Parish. On June 7, of that year fourteen lots were purchased on University Avenue for about $8,000 by the Rev. Daniel F. Mulvihil, the parish's first pastor. Two more lots were bought for $1,375 on July 20. These purchases marked the beginning of St. John's parish. The school was the first building built by the parish. A chapel on the second floor served the parish as its church. The first Mass was celebrated on Christmas Day in 1905. Between 1907 and 1918 the school included both primary and secondary programs. The Sisters of Charity of the Blessed Virgin Mary taught in the school. The high school program was discontinued when citywide Catholic high schools for boys and girls opened. In 1911 the parish became a part of the newly established Diocese of Des Moines. A brick rectory was built c. 1912 to the west of the school. The parish was incorporated on December 16, 1912.

In August 1913 the basement of the present church was completed and the parish used it for its church until the upper church was completed. It was part of the designs for a new church by the Des Moines architectural firm of Proudfoot, Bird & Rawson. The rest of that church design was not built. The architects who designed the present church were from Maginnis & Walsh of Boston. They were also responsible for the Basilica of the National Shrine of the Immaculate Conception in Washington, D.C. The parish priest at St. John's, the Rev. Martin S. McNamara, was also influential in the design especially in having it based on Maginnis & Walsh's design for St. Catherine's Church in Somerville, Massachusetts (c. 1915) as well as the Basilica of Saint Paul Outside the Walls in Rome (rebuilt 1823). McNamara had previously been responsible for the design and construction of All Saints Church in Stuart, Iowa, another Maginnis & Walsh project. The local architect chosen to supervise the project was John Normile. Charles W. Wietz' Sons was the contractor who built the church building.

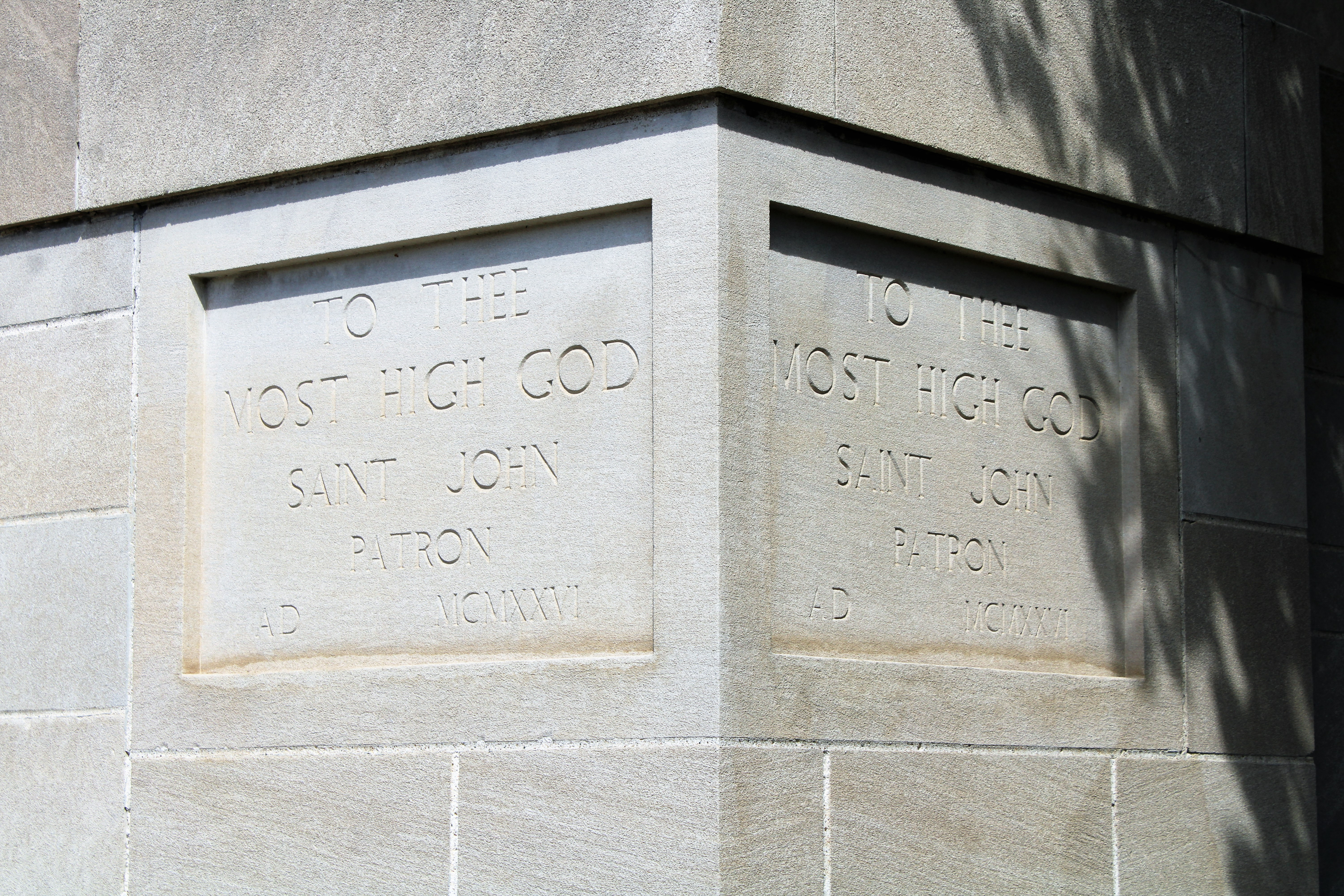
Cornerstone

The cornerstone for the present church was laid on September 19, 1926. The footprint of the present church extends several feet beyond that of the 1913 basement. Initially, the exterior of the church was designed to be brick because Maginnis & Walsh thought limestone was too expensive, but Father McNamara insisted he could raise the necessary funds and he did. The church was built for $480,000. The finished church was dedicated by Bishop Thomas W. Drumm on December 4, 1927. Two other Catholic bishops and over one hundred priests from the Des Moines diocese and elsewhere attended the dedication. The baldachin and high altar, designed by Maginnis & Walsh, were added in 1929. The building was also designed to have a 500-seat chapel built off to the east of the altar area, but it has never been built.

The first of the church's stained glass windows was installed in 1947, and the rest were installed by 1953. The widows were delayed because of the financial constraints related to the Great Depression and World War II. Conrad Pickel Studio of Waukesha, Wisconsin designed the church's 10 nave windows and the 36 clerestory windows. The church suffered water damage in fires on February 18, 1961 and February 6, 1970, but they did not cause any serious damage. A new convent was built across the street to the west of the church.

A temporary free-standing altar was set up for the priest to face the people in 1964. The first vernacular Mass in Des Moines was celebrated at St. John's by Msgr. Edward Pfeffer, the chancellor of the diocese. The present altar used for liturgy was consecrated on June 5, 1983. That same year an addition designed by Higgins, Shirk & Colvig of Des Moines was added on the east side of the church and connects it to the rectory. It reflects the basilica's original design and provides a handicap entrance into the church. The Conrad Pickel Studio also designed the stained glass windows for the east addition.

The church was listed on the National Register of Historic Places on September 8, 1987. Pope John Paul II elevated St. John's Church to a Minor Basilica on October 4, 1989. Bishop William H. Bullock presided at the dedication liturgy on December 31, 1989.

== Architecture ==
St. John's was designed in the basilica form of the Romanesque Revival style found in Northern Italy known as Lombardy Romanesque. The church is built of Indiana limestone that was probably acquired from Tri-Cities' Stone Company of Davenport, Iowa. The stone veneer is applied to the exterior in a random ashlar pattern. The cut stone trim was provided by Rowat Cut Stone Company of Des Moines. The church measures 138 by 80 feet (42 by 24 m) and has a 115-foot (35 m) campanile on the west rear of the building that contains a 600-pound (270 kg) bell that was cast in 1961. The bell was installed by the I.T. Verdin Company of Cincinnati. Over the main entrance is a sculptural frame that includes a figure of Christ and angels. It is supported by columns in the Corinthian order with acanthus designs. The building is covered by a red tile roof, and the tower is capped by a bronze cross.

The interior of the basilica is finished in plaster cast and travertine marble. The barrel vaulted coffered ceiling covered in gold leaf rises 50 feet (15 m) above the floor. The main nave is flanked by side aisles. Des Moines artist Dominic Damiani painted a mural of Christ the King surrounded by symbols of the Four Evangelists on the gilded upper section of the apse. The columns of the baldachin are Bescia marble and the high altar is Botticino marble. The clerestory windows depict the sacraments, cardinal virtues of the church, and offices and teachings of humankind. Below the windows are Scripture quotes relating to the institution of the sacraments and another set of quotes from the popular devotional prayer the Hail Mary. Below the quotes are a set of marble disks that symbolize the universality of the church. The church has a seating capacity of 900 people.

== Pipe organ ==
The basilica's pipe organ is a 1963 Casavant Frères Ltée., Opus 2723. The organ is located in the rear gallery of the church. Some of the pipes are exposed and frame the rose window. The traditional style console with roll top is in the center of the instrument in a fixed position. The organ features two manuals, three divisions, 30 stops, 30 registers, 38 ranks and 1,998 pipes. The manual compass is 61 notes and the pedal compass is 32 notes. The organ also has electro-pneumatic (EP) chests, drawknobs in vertical rows on angled jambs, balanced swell shoes/pedals and standard AGO placement. Rounding out the features are adjustable combination pistons, AGO Standard (concave radiating) pedalboard, crescendo pedal, reversible full organ/tutti toe stud, combination action thumb pistons and coupler reversible toe studs.

Stop list:

GREAT

- 16' Quintaton 61
- 8' Principal 61
- 8' Gedackt 61
- 4' Octave 61
- 4' Kleingedackt 61
- 2' Blockflöte 61
- II Rauschquinte 122
- IV Mixture 244
- 8' Trompette 61
- Chimes

SWELL

- 8' Salicional 61
- 16' Principal 32
- 8' Salicional Cel 54
- 8' Rohrflöte 61
- 8' Quintadena 61
- 4' Spitzflöte 61
- 2' Principal 61
- 1 1/3' Quintflöte 61
- IV Scharff 244
- 16' Basson L/2 61
- 8' Trompette 61
- 4' Hautbois 61
- Tremulant

PEDAL

- 16' Subbass 32
- 8' Spitzprincipal 32
- 8' Pommer 32
- 4' Octave 32
- 4' Rohrflöte 32
- 2' Nachthorn 32
- II Mixture 64
- 16' Posaune L/2 32
- 4' Schalmei L/2 32

== Charity work ==
In 1992, the Basilica of St. John joined with seven other churches in the Des Moines area and created the Churches United Shelter (now the Central Iowa Shelter), to combat homelessness in the area.
