= Thomas Drumm =

Thomas Drumm may refer to:

- Thomas E. Drumm (1909–1990), U.S. government official
- Thomas William Drumm (1871–1933), American Roman Catholic Church bishop
