= Drumm =

Drumm is a surname. Notable people with the surname include:

- Arthur E. Drumm (born 1929), American inventor and businessman
- Don Drumm (sculptor), American sculptor
- Don Drumm (singer), American singer
- Emily Drumm (born 1974), New Zealand cricketer
- James J. Drumm, Irish inventor
- Kevin Drumm (born 1970), American musician
- Leroy Drumm (1936–2010), American songwriter
- Máire Drumm (1919–1976), Northern Ireland politician
- Thomas E. Drumm (1909–1990), American government official
- Thomas William Drumm (1871–1933), Irish-born American Roman Catholic bishop
- Tommy Drumm (born 1955), Irish Gaelic footballer

Fictional characters:

- Daniel Drumm, character in Marvel Comics
