= St. Ambrose Cathedral (Des Moines, Iowa) =

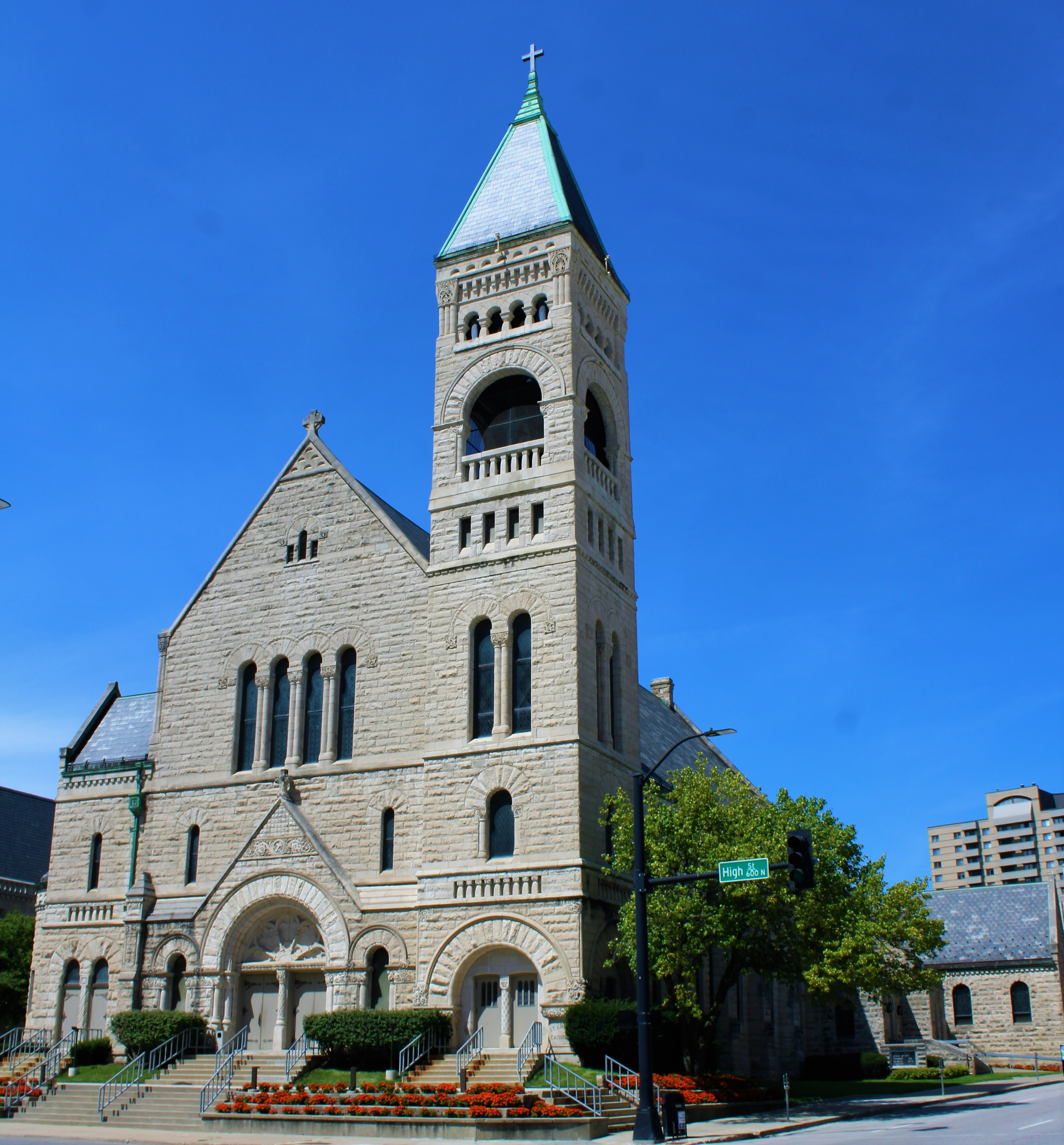
- St. Ambrose Cathedral in 2022
- St. Ambrose Cathedral
- Location: 607 High Street; Des Moines, Iowa
- Country: United States
- Denomination: Catholic Church
- Website: www.saintambrosecathedral.org

History
- Status: Cathedral/Parish
- Founded: 1856 (parish)
- Dedication: Ambrose of Milan
- Dedicated: October 11, 1891

Architecture
- Functional status: Active
- Architect: James J. Egan
- Style: Romanesque Revival
- Groundbreaking: 1890
- Completed: 1891

Specifications
- Length: 185 feet (56 m)
- Width: 102 feet (31 m)
- Materials: Bedford stone

Administration
- Diocese: Des Moines

Clergy
- Bishop: Most Rev. William Joensen
- Rector: Rev. Nipin Scaria
- St. Ambrose Cathedral and Rectory
- U.S. National Register of Historic Places
- Location within Iowa Location within the United States
- Coordinates: 41°35′19.7″N 93°37′32.7″W
- Area: 1.25 acres (0.51 ha)
- Built: 1927 (rectory)
- NRHP reference No.: 79000927
- Added to NRHP: March 30, 1979

St. Ambrose Cathedral is a historic building located in downtown Des Moines, Iowa, in the United States. It serves as a parish church and as the seat of the Diocese of Des Moines in the Catholic Church. The cathedral, along with the adjoining rectory, was listed on the National Register of Historic Places in 1979.

== History ==
=== St. Ambrose Churches ===
The predecessors to St. Ambrose Cathedral were the three St. Ambrose Churches in Des Moines. The first mass in present-day Des Moines was celebrated in a log hut in 1851 at Fort Des Moines by Alexander Hattenberger, a priest from Ottumwa, Iowa. At the time, Des Moines was part of the Diocese of Dubuque, which covered the entire state of Iowa. Over the next few years, priests from Dubuque would visit Des Moines to celebrate mass or perform sacraments for Catholics.

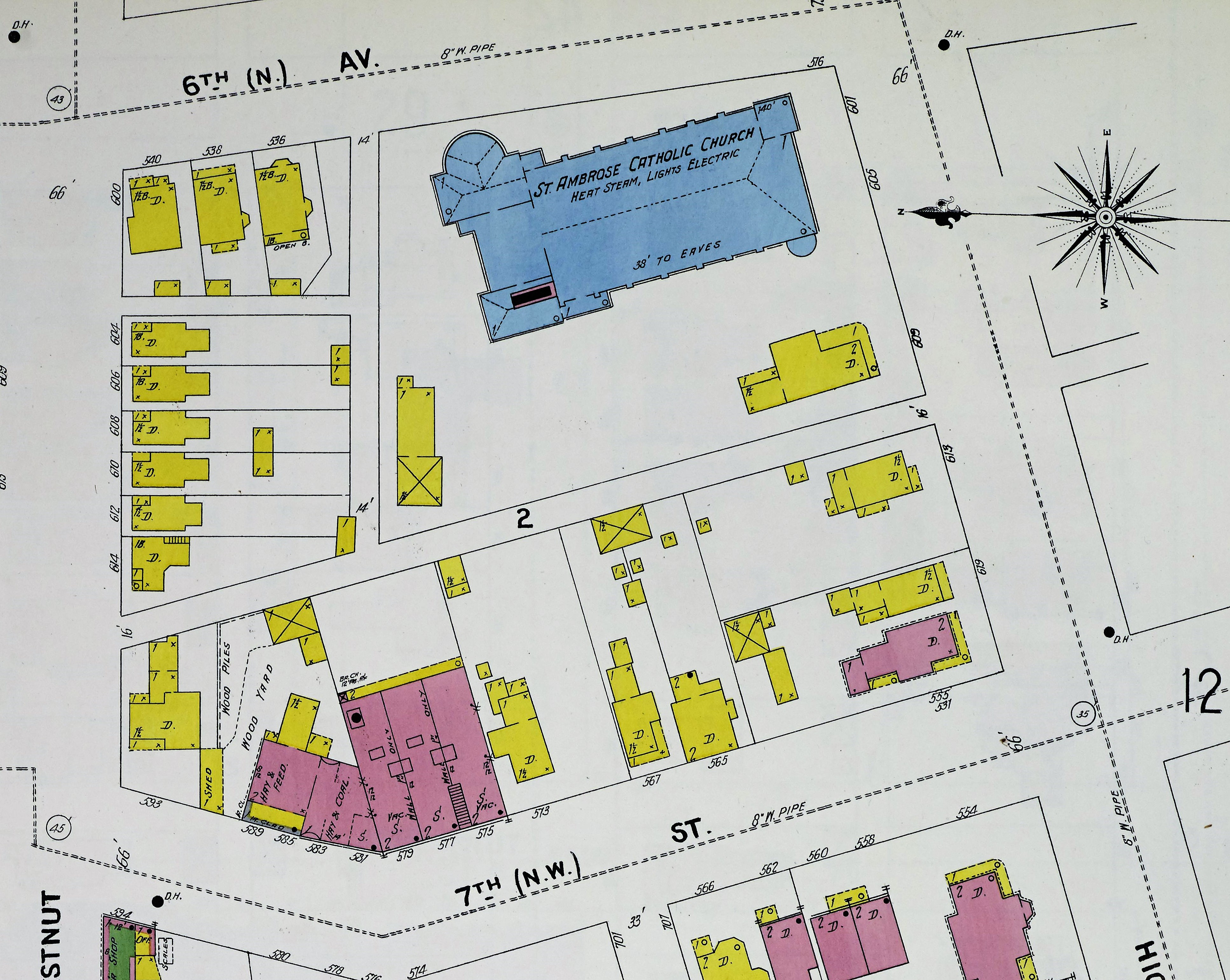
St. Ambrose Cathedral is shown in blue on this map (1901)

In 1856, a Father De Cailly purchased a land parcel in Des Moines for its first Catholic church. George Plathe, the first resident priest assigned to Des Moines, constructed the first St. Ambrose Church. The new church was only 40 by 24 feet (12.2 by 7.3 m). At that time, St. Ambrose was the only parish in southwest Iowa.

John F. Brazill was appointed pastor of St. Ambrose in 1861; he built the St. Ambrose grade school in 1863. During this period, Bishop Clement Smyth of Dubuque named Brazill the vicar general of the diocese. Over the next two decades, he used his connections with the state government to amass large real estate holdings in Des Moines, both for himself and the diocese. In 1865, a contingent of the Sisters of Charity of the Blessed Virgin Mary moved to Des Moines to teach at St. Ambrose.

In 1865, Brazill completed construction of the second St. Ambrose Church, a larger stone building. The Gothic Revival structure featured two towers that flanked the main facade. In 1881, Pope Leo XIII erected the Diocese of Davenport, which included Des Moines.

The growth of St. Ambrose Parish in the 1880s prompted its pastor, Michael Flavin, to start planning a new church. He decided to build the church on a property acquired by Brazill at Sixth and High Streets in Des Moines. Flavin hired the architect James J. Egan of Chicago to design the building. He was already working on Sacred Heart Cathedral in Davenport

Flavin started construction of the third St. Ambrose church in 1890 and it was completed the following year. It was built for about $120,000. Bishop Henry Cosgrove of Davenport dedicated St. Ambrose on October 11, 1891. While visiting the 1893 Columbian Exposition in Chicago, Flavin saw a model for a high altar designed by Tiffany Studios in New York City. He ordered a marble copy of it for St. Ambrose from Italy.

In 1905, the Diocese of Davenport erected St. John's Parish, in Des Moines from the northern portion of St. Ambrose Parish. The next year St. Anthony's Parish was established on the south side of Des Moines. Flavin opposed its establishment because he did not want to lose the parish territory.

=== St. Ambrose Cathedral ===
In 1911, Pope Pius X erected the Diocese of Des Moines and designated St. Ambrose Church as St. Ambrose Cathedral.St. Augustin's Parish, on the west side of Des Moines, was founded from St. Ambrose in 1920.

Bishop Thomas Drumm and Francis O'Connell, rector of the cathedral, executed the first renovation of the building during the 1920s. They built a rectory next to the church in 1927. A new bishop's throne of inlaid marble, pulpit, and communion rail were created for the church. The Chapel of Our Lady in the rear of the cathedral was also added at this time. A new pipe organ was added in 1929.

A second renovation of St. Ambrose occurred in the 1940s with the installation of new stained glass windows and the Stations of the Cross. A new 18-foot (5.5 m) reredos was created for the high altar's original mensa by Conrad Schmitt Studios of Milwaukee.

Bishop Maurice Dingman started another large-scale renovation of the cathedral in the 1970s. The building needed repairs and he wanted to enact liturgical changes to the building that were dictated by the Second Vatican Council of the early 1960s. The John Lorenz and James Laurenzo were co-pastors at the time. Dingman invited the entire diocese to participate in the planning process. He hire Maur Burbach of St. Pius X Monastery in Pevely, Missouri as a liturgical consultant and Rambusch Decorating Company of New York City as designers. The renovation was completed in 1978.

On January 12, 1972, St. Ambrose Cathedral host the episcopal consecration of Walter Righter as the bishop of the Episcopal Diocese of Iowa.

In 1996, the diocese repainted and redecorated the cathedral, finishing in 199. The diocese hired Don A. Wendt of Ecclesiastical Studios & Sons of Greenwood, Missouri to do the work. The diocese in 2015 installed LED lighting on the exterior of the belltower.

== Cathedral exterior ==
St. Ambrose Cathedral was designed in the Romanesque Revival style, similar to churches found in Southern France. Covered in Bedford limestone, the structure measures 185 by 102 feet (56 by 31 m). The main entranced is contained in a round arch below a triangular pediment. Mounted above the entrance are four elongated, round-arched windows that are separated by a pair of Corinthian columns.

The cathedral has a bell tower that is 120 feet (37 m) tall. The bell tower is split into five sections, each with a different style of stonework. It is topped by a pyramid-shaped spire. Flanking the left side of the entrance is a structure that is two-thirds the height of the larger church and is articulated by a semicircular projection that is topped by a conical roof. The exterior of the church features a rounded apse. When it was first built, the church had a symmetrical design to it. When the chapel was built that symmetry was broken.

== Cathedral interior ==
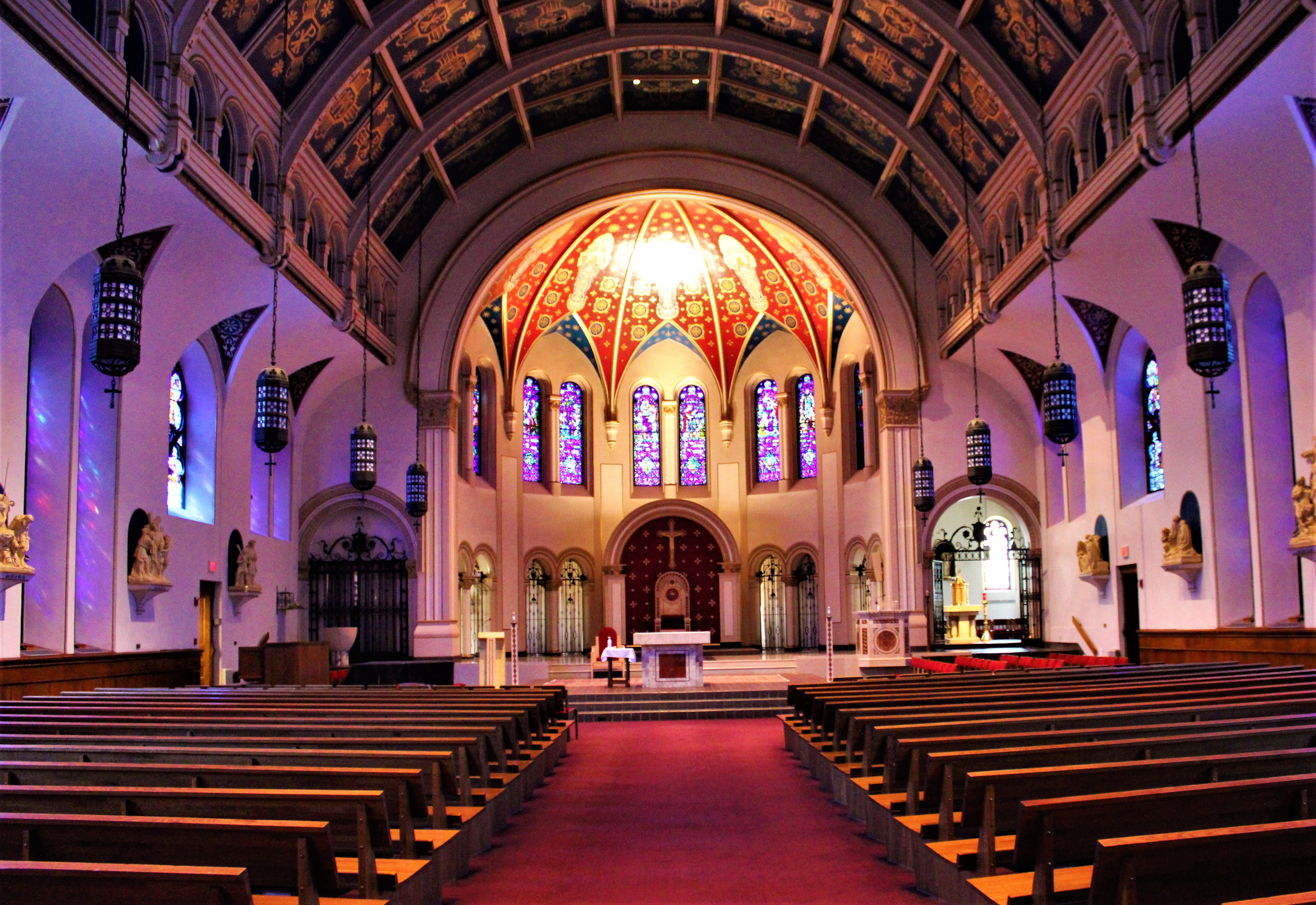
Cathedral interior (2022)

The interior of St. Ambrose Cathedral is a large open expanse without pillars. The barrel vault ceiling rises 50 feet (15 m) above the floor. The cathedral windows are translucent mosaics. They depict the establishment of Catholicism in the United States, the State of Iowa, and the Diocese of Des Moines.

The rose window in the Chapel of Our Lady depicts the seven gifts of the Holy Spirit. The altar, ambo and chair in the chapel were used by Pope John Paul II during a mass he celebrated in Iowa in 1979.

== Rectory ==
The St. Ambrose rectory is a three-story structure that was designed in the Romanesque Revival style to match the cathedral. Composed of stone and brick, the building is 85 by 60 feet (26 by 18 m). Its gabled roof runs parallel to that of the cathedrals. The structure is L-shaped and connects to the cathedral through an arcade.

The rectory windows are largely rectangular in shape. The main façade has a row of round-arch windows on the second floor. The center two windows are framed by an arch and engaged columns above the building's main entrance. A semi-circular staircase protrudes from the east elevation near the main façade.

Cathedral campus images

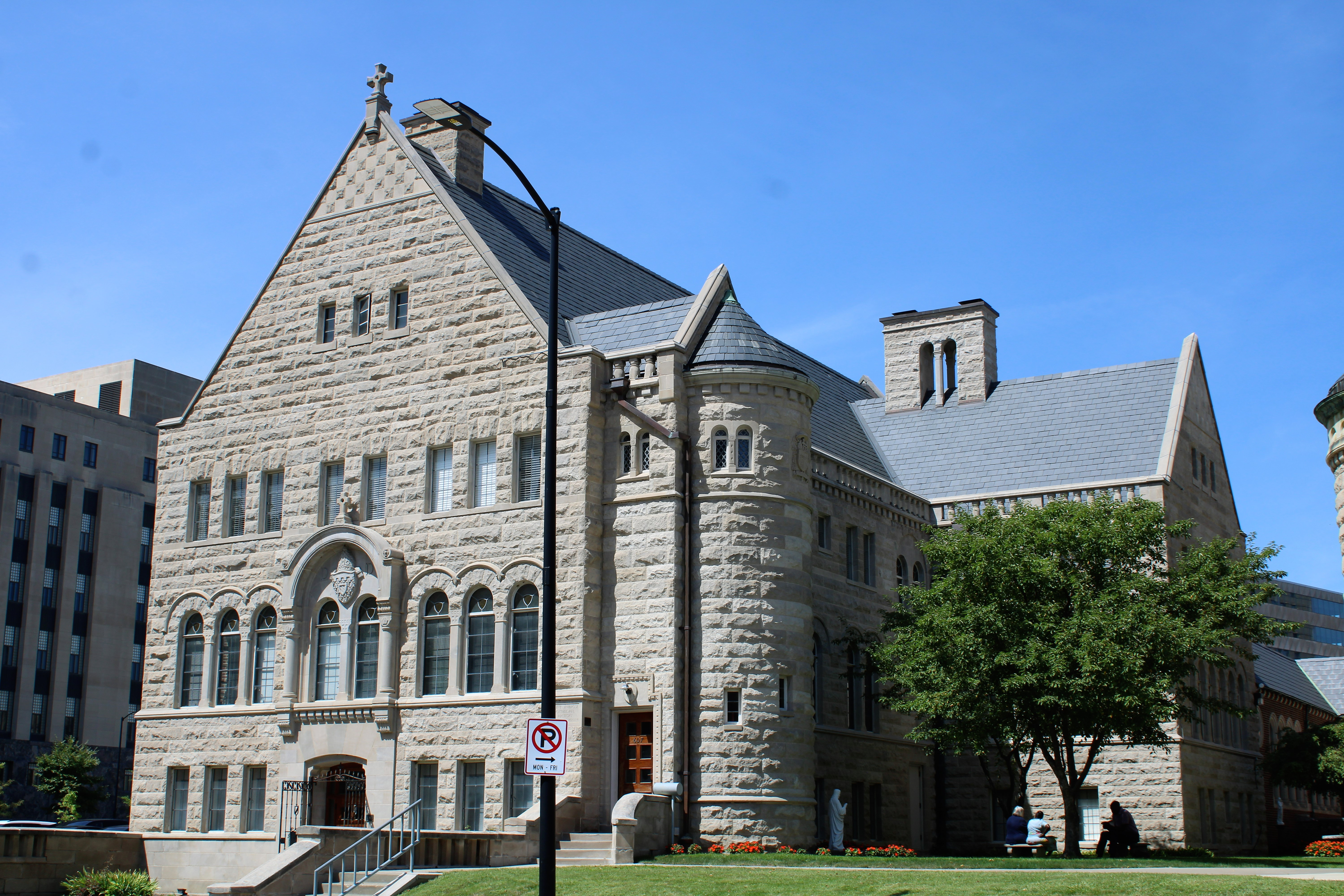
Rectory (2022)

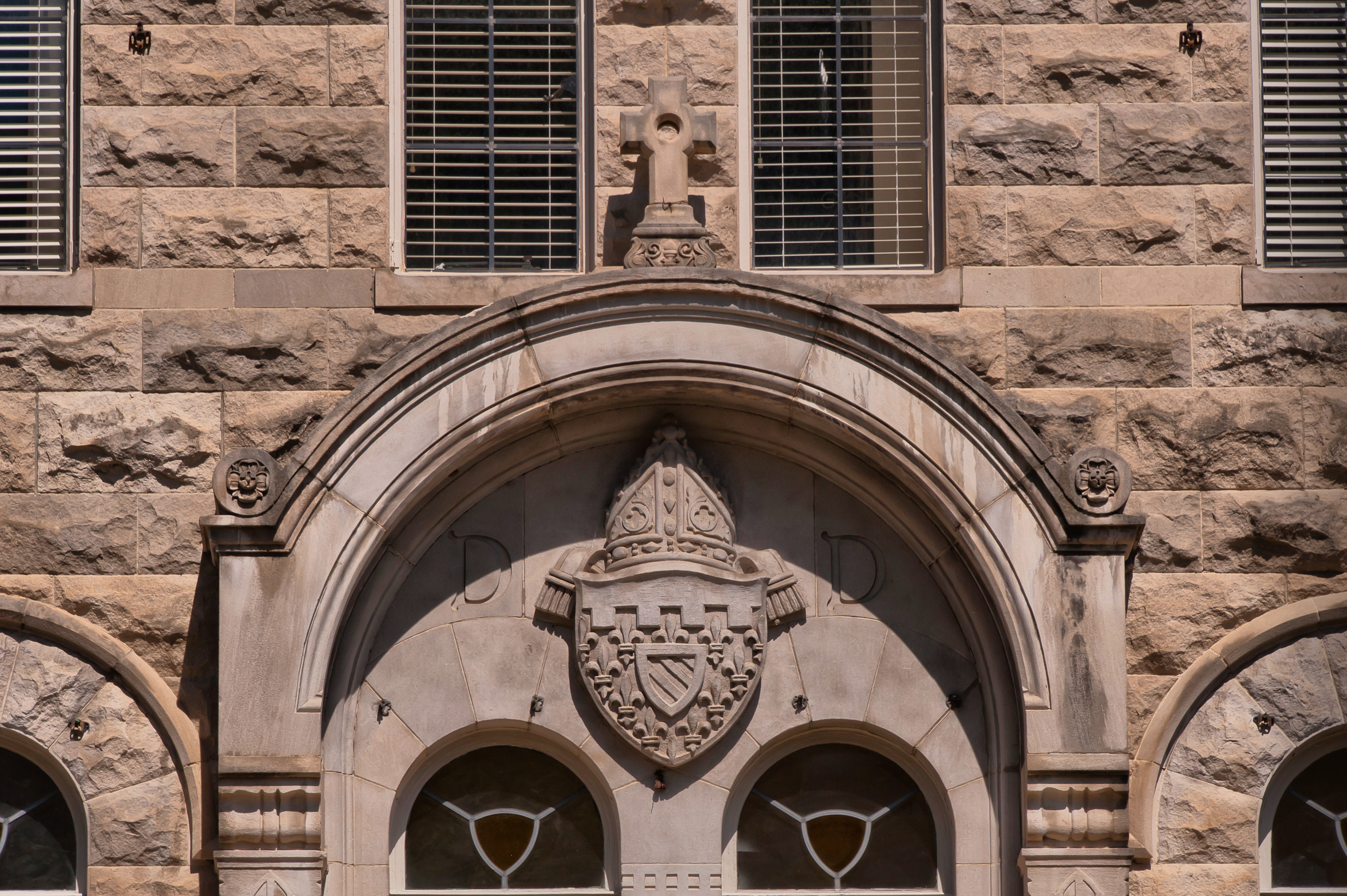
Timpanum on rectory (2013)

Priest with cathedra in background (2021)

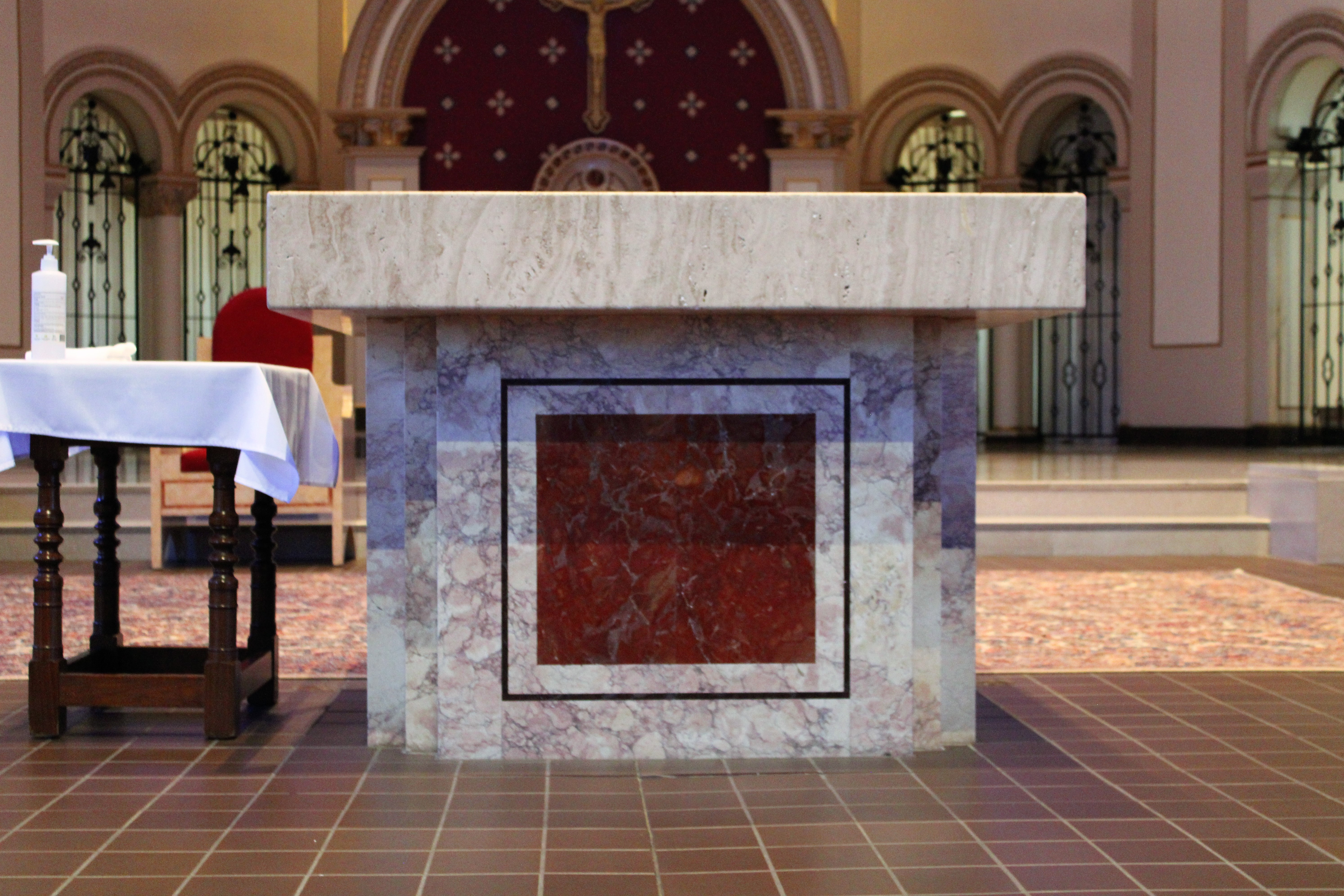
Altar, cathedral (2022)

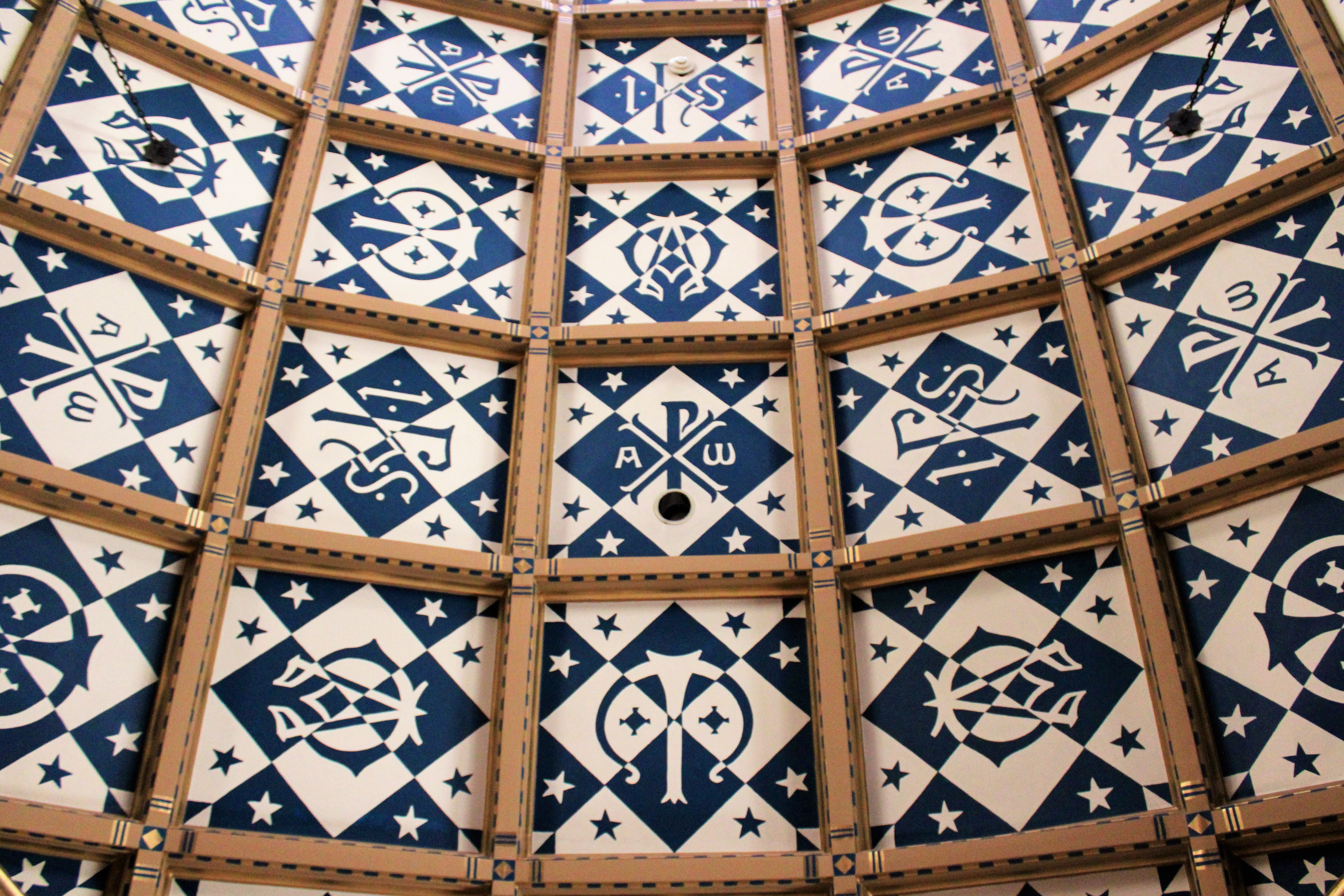
Chapel of Our Lady, cathedral (2022)

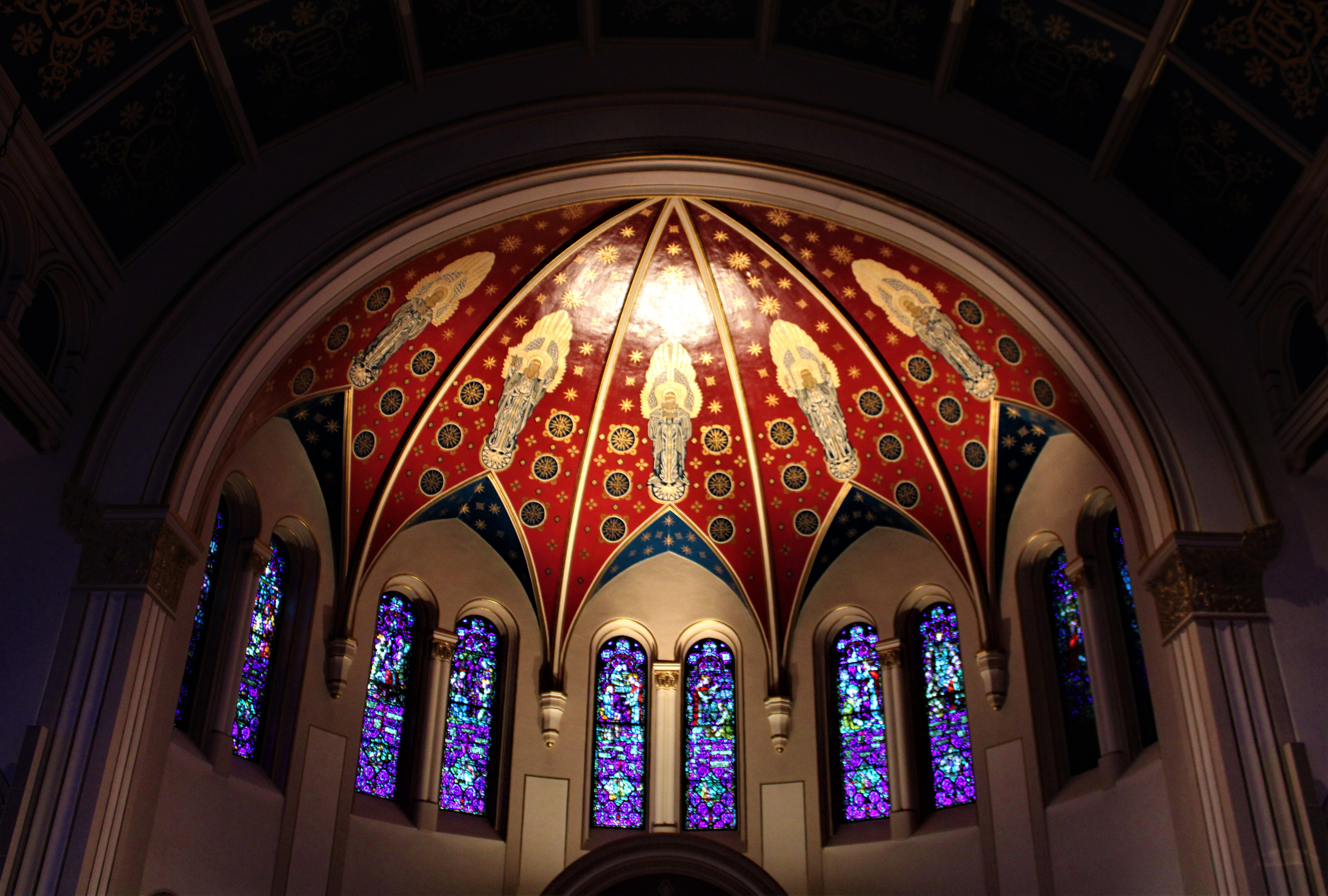
Interior dome, cathedral (2022)

== See also ==
- List of Catholic cathedrals in the United States
- List of cathedrals in the United States
