= Edward Celestin Daly =

His Excellency, The Most Reverend Edward C. Daly O.P
- Bishop of Des Moines
- Church: Roman Catholic Church
- See: Des Moines
- In office: March 13, 1948 – November 23, 1964
- Predecessor: Gerald Thomas Bergan
- Successor: George Biskup

Orders
- Ordination: June 12, 1921 by John T. McNicholas
- Consecration: May 13, 1948 by Amleto Giovanni Cicognani

Personal details
- Born: October 24, 1894 Cambridge, Massachusetts, US
- Died: November 23, 1964 (aged 70) Fiumicino, Italy
- Education: Catholic University of America; Dominican House of Studies
- Motto: In petra fidei (On the rock of faith)

Edward Celestin Daly, O.P. (October 24, 1894 – November 23, 1964) was an American prelate of the Roman Catholic Church. He served as bishop of the Diocese of Des Moines in Iowa from 1948 until his death in 1964. Daly was a member of the Order of Preachers (Dominicans).

== Biography ==
=== Early life ===
Edward Daly was born on October 24, 1894, in Cambridge, Massachusetts, to James and Elizabeth (née Cairns) Daly. He attended Boston College in Boston, Massachusetts, from 1912 to 1914, and made his profession as a member of Dominicans in 1915. He studied philosophy and theology at the Dominican House of Studies in Washington, D.C.

=== Priesthood ===
At age 26, Daly was ordained to the priesthood in Washington for the Order of Preachers by Bishop John T. McNicholas on June 12, 1921. Daly then studied canon law at the Catholic University of America until 1923, when he became secretary and archivist of the Apostolic Delegation in Washington. During this period, he earned a Master of Sacred Theology degree in Rome in 1936 and also served as professor of canon law at the Dominican House of Studies.

=== Bishop of Des Moines ===
On March 13, 1948, Daly was appointed the fourth bishop of Des Moines by Pope Pius XII. He received his episcopal consecration on May 13, 1948, at St. Ambrose Cathedral in Des Moines, Iowa, from Archbishop Amleto Cicognani, with Archbishops Henry Rohlman and Leo Binz serving as co-consecrators. The Vatican elevated Daly to the rank of assistant at the pontifical throne in 1958.

=== Death ===
Daly attended the first three sessions of the Second Vatican Council in Rome. Leaving Rome after the third session, Edward Daly died on November 23, 1964, when his plane, TWA Flight 800, crashed during takeoff at Fiumicino Airport in Fiumicino, Italy, near Rome.
