= Nazareth Hall Preparatory Seminary =

High school seminary in the United States

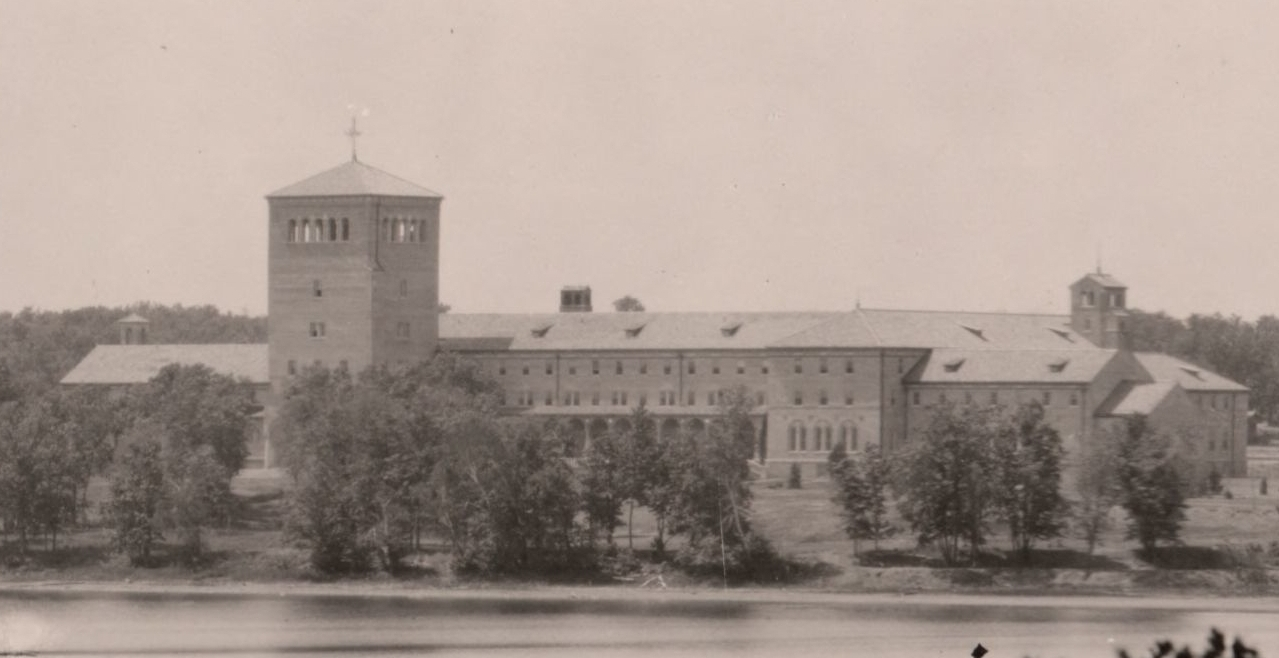
- Nazareth Hall as it appeared in 1924
- Type: Catholic seminary; Minor seminary; Private university
- Active: 1923–1970
- Founder: Austin Dowling
- Parent institution: Archdiocese of Saint Paul and Minneapolis
- Religious affiliation: Roman Catholic
- Location: 3003 North Snelling Avenue, Saint Paul, Minnesota, U.S. 45.0388°N 93.1690°W
- Campus: 89 acres (36 ha); suburban

Nazareth Hall Preparatory Seminary, known familiarly as Naz Hall, was a high school seminary in Arden Hills, Minnesota, United States, serving the Archdiocese of Saint Paul and Minneapolis. Founded in 1923 by Archbishop Austin Dowling, for most of its time Nazareth Hall educated students through four years of high school and the first two years of college. Over 600 alumni were eventually ordained to the priesthood. Due to declining enrollment and changing attitudes towards high school seminaries after the Second Vatican Council, it closed in 1970 with its collegiate functions being replaced by Saint John Vianney Seminary. The campus was sold and is now the site of the University of Northwestern.

== History ==
=== Background ===
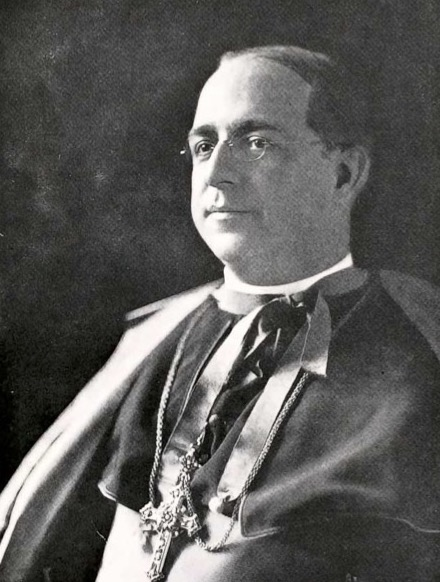
Archbishop Austin Dowling, founder of Nazareth Hall

In the early years of the Diocese of Saint Paul, its high-school and early college-aged seminarians were educated at a number of institutions. Many of the first seminarians of the diocese were tutored by bishop Joseph Crétin and other clerical teachers in the rectory next to the Cathedral of Saint Paul. In 1862, Bishop Thomas Grace opened the Ecclesiastical Preparatory Seminary of St. Paul in the former cathedral. In 1867, that institution merged with the coeducational cathedral school which operated in the same building. In November 1866, Grace purchased 40 acres (0.16 km^{2}) on the shores of Lake Johanna for the purpose of establishing a permanent seminary. However, after the re-opening of the Benedictine St. John's College within the diocese in 1867, those plans were stalled and seminarians were educated either at St. John's or more distant institutions in the United States or Europe.

Grace's successor, John Ireland, took office in June 1884 and in December of that same year announced plans to build a seminary for the diocese which would become the University of St. Thomas. The fledgling college would function as a combination of a theological seminary, minor seminary, junior college, high school, and junior high school.

=== Founding ===
Following Archbishop Ireland's death in 1918, Austin Dowling became the Archbishop of St. Paul, and began to plan to separate the preparatory seminary from the College of St. Thomas, envisioning a secluded rural institution at the Lake Johanna property that would aid in recruiting both priestly candidates and financial supporters. On the first anniversary of the death of Archbishop John Ireland, Dowling established a fund to finance the building of a preparatory seminary. In the fund, $1,280,000 ($27.4 million in 2025) was raised specifically for the construction and endowment of the seminary. These plans were announced to the public in 1920, with the Romanesque-style campus estimated to cost $500,000 ($10.7 million in 2025) to construct, and planned to house 250 persons. The cornerstone of the new complex was laid by Dowling on May 21, 1922, in a solemn ceremony. The architects were Maginnis & Walsh of Boston, and the seminary was completed and dedicated by September 1923.

The redirection of diocesan funds and the withdrawal of minor seminarians had an impact upon the still-young College of Saint Thomas, as the 140 high-school age seminarians moving from St. Thomas to Nazareth Hall constituted nearly twenty percent of the student body at this time. Additionally, some within the archdiocese thought that the establishment of Nazareth Hall spread the resources of the archdiocese too thinly, and many criticized the separation of high-school age students as undesirable.

=== Operation ===
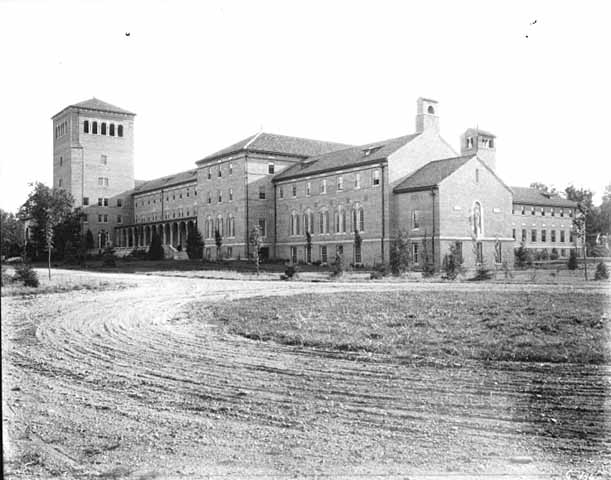
Nazareth Hall shortly after opening

Timothy Crowley was the first rector of the seminary from 1923 to 1935. In its first year, there were 125 students. In the early years, the school struggled financially, operating at a deficit according to a 1929 report. Dowling was nevertheless resistant to hearing any criticism of his project, and furnished a personal suite at the school for his frequent retreats and visits there. As one priest of the archdiocese stated: "Nazareth Hall was the apple of his eye and woe betide the priest or layman who dared to utter an uncomplimentary syllable about the institution, its architecture, purpose, faculty or product. Every other institution in the archdiocese was a stepchild, seldom visited except officially."

Nazareth Hall covered six years of education—four years of high school and the first two years of collegiate studies. The remaining six years were done at Saint Paul Seminary. Coursework for the students included classes in Latin, Gregorian chant, math, the sciences, and social studies. Not all students who attended Nazareth ended up becoming priests, and so over time seminary leadership worked to make the curriculum suitable preparation for life outside of the priesthood.

Students produced a publication called Puer Nazarenus (transl. Boy of Nazareth) which contained pieces such as poems, stories, and a humor column. Students had basketball leagues, and played pool, handball, football, skating, skiing, table tennis, and other sports. Over time, the institution received a shorthand nickname of Naz Hall. The Sisters of Saint Francis (OSF) assisted with the domestic operations of the seminary and lived in one of the wings of the building.

By 1949, the institution had 226 students and more than 185 alumni had been ordained to the priesthood for the Archdiocese of Saint Paul and Minneapolis; 70 had been ordained for other dioceses, one to the Ruthenian Greek Catholic Church (Stephen Kocisko) and 13 for religious orders. In 1962, St. Austin's House (now called Riley Hall) was added on to the main complex due to growth in the seminary body throughout the 1950s. The peak enrollment for the seminary was in 1962, with 270 in the high school and 89 in the college. By the time of its closure in 1970, about 600 priests had been ordained; some 3,000 students attended Nazareth Hall during its 48 years of operation.

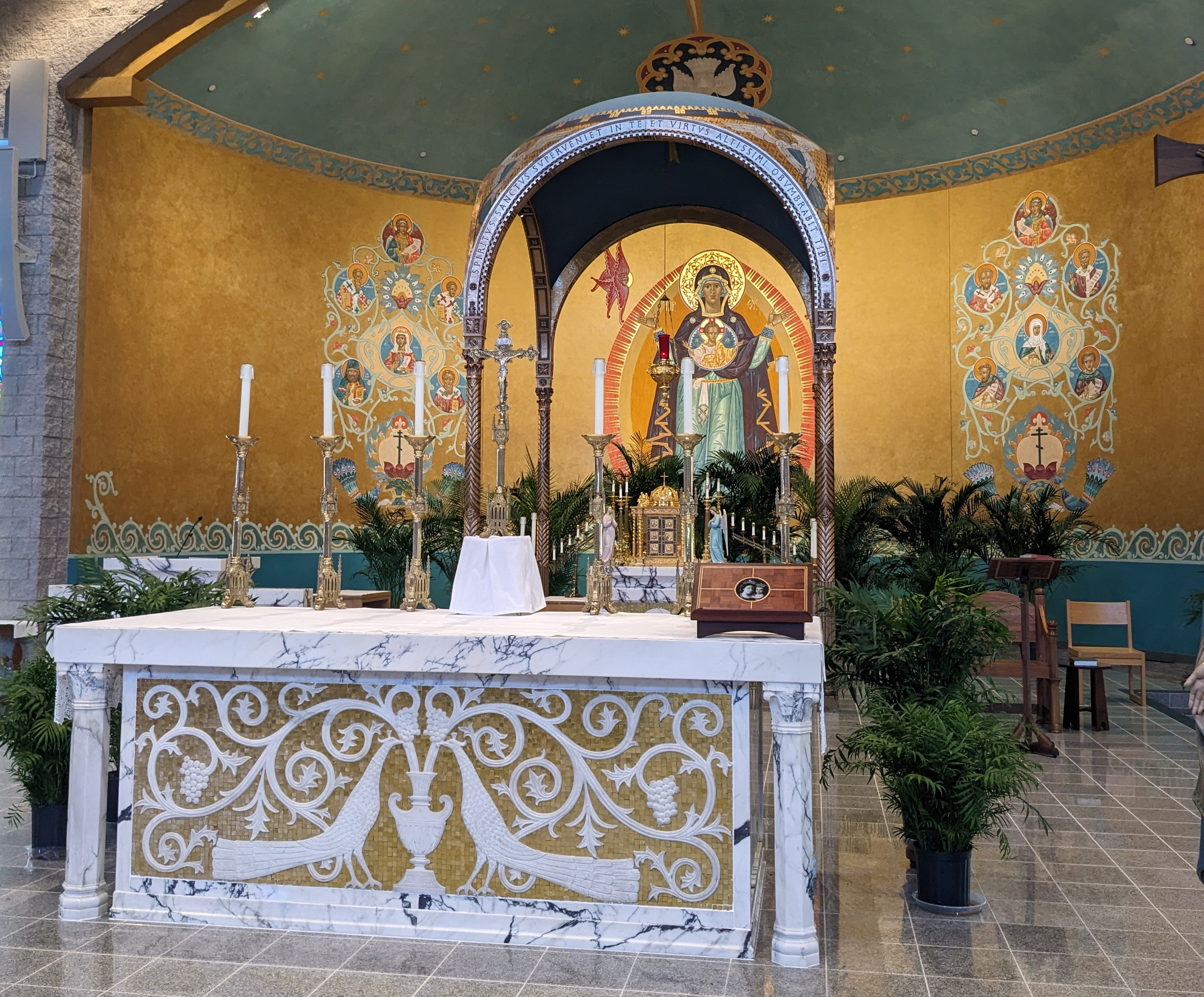
The altar and baldachin from Nazareth Hall Preparatory Seminary, now at the Church of Saint Michael in Saint Michael, Minnesota

=== Closing and acquisition by Northwestern College ===
In 1959, Archbishop William Brady ordered a feasibility study for a "4-4-4" plan for priestly formation: four years of study at Nazareth Hall, four years of study at the College of Saint Thomas, and four years of study at the Saint Paul Seminary. This plan was overwhelmingly supported. But due to declining enrollment after the Second Vatican Council, by 1967 the 4-4-4 plan seemed no longer feasible and there was a stronger desire to create a college seminary at the University of St. Thomas and close Nazareth Hall. In 1968, enrollment fell from 148 the prior year to 105 with the opening of Saint John Vianney College Seminary. On January 8, 1970, Archbishop Byrne announced that Nazareth Hall would close after the 1969–70 academic year.

The land and buildings were sold for $2,575,000 ($20.5 million in 2025) to Northwestern College (now the University of Northwestern). This decision was negatively received by the clergy of the archdiocese, especially the perceived low sale price, which was seen as the seminary being "given away". The University of Northwestern presently uses the buildings for academic and administrative uses, and has preserved much of the campus in its original state.

== Buildings ==
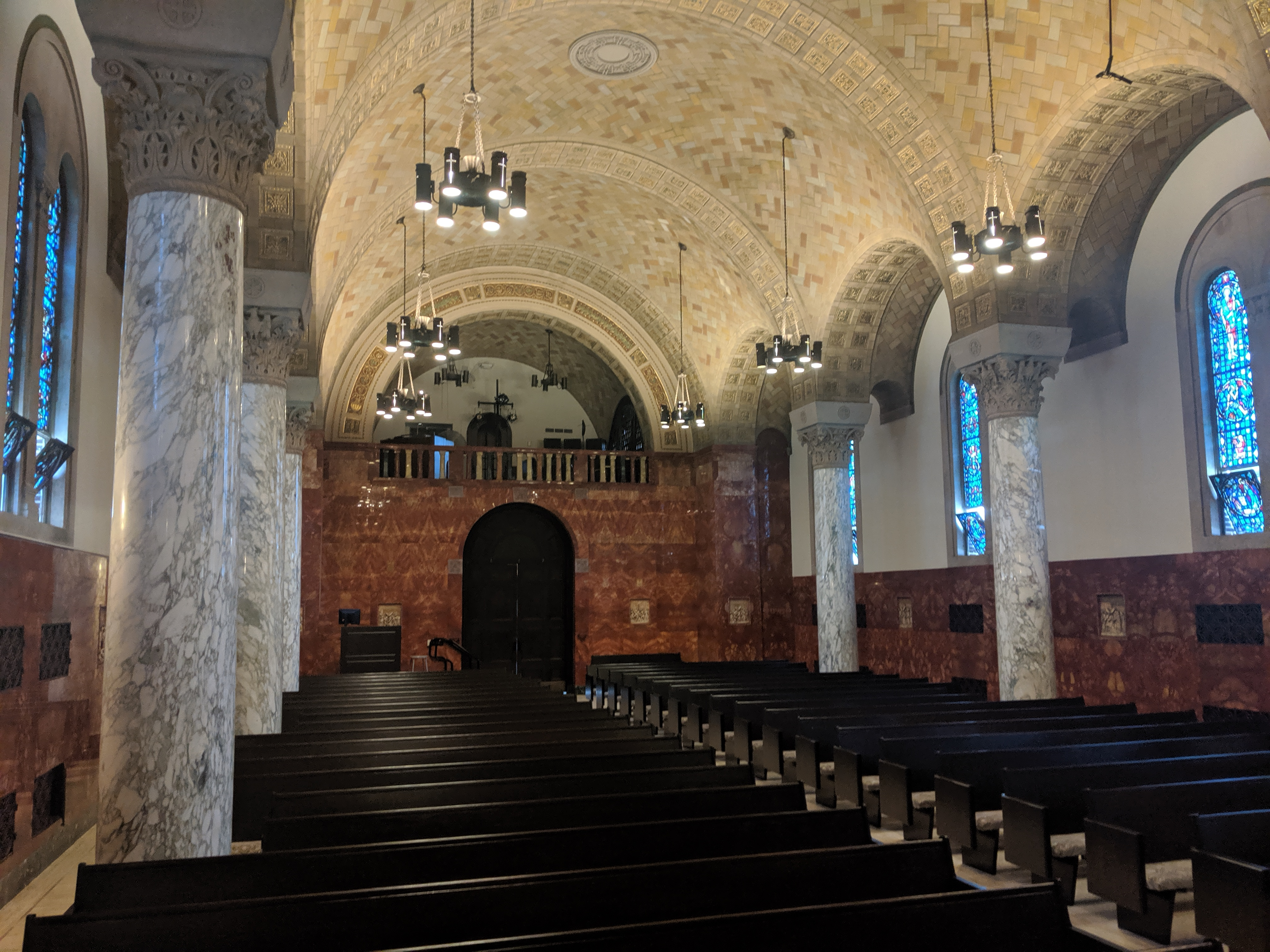
A view towards the rear of the seminary chapel as it currently exists at the University of Northwestern

The campus of Nazareth Hall, which is still maintained and is in active use by the University of Northwestern – St. Paul, primarily consists of "six buildings in one." The Lombard Romanesque chapel, residence wings, and classrooms are all interconnected across 120,752 square feet (11,218.2 m^{2}).

The main entrance, beneath the 40-by-40-foot (12 by 12 m) long and wide, and 105-foot-tall (32 m) bell tower, shows the child Jesus standing with arms outstretched; inscriptions of "Amen, amen, dico vobis quia ego sum ostium ovium" (transl. Amen, Amen, I say to you, I am the door of the sheep) and "Venite ad me quoniam iugum meum suave est et onus leve" (transl. Come to me because my yoke is sweet and my burden light) surround him.

=== Our Lady of the Annunciation Chapel ===
The chapel was named for Our Lady of the Annunciation and was consecrated on September 8, 1924. It originally sat 300 people and has a crypt church underneath where daily Masses were said. The lower portion of the chapel walls are made from red Numidian marble from Africa. Gray marble columns support the tile vaulted ceiling. While the apse dome has since been painted white, it was originally gold leaf.

The pews have since been replaced by the University of Northwestern. The space, since renamed Nazareth Chapel by the University of Northwestern, is a popular wedding venue.

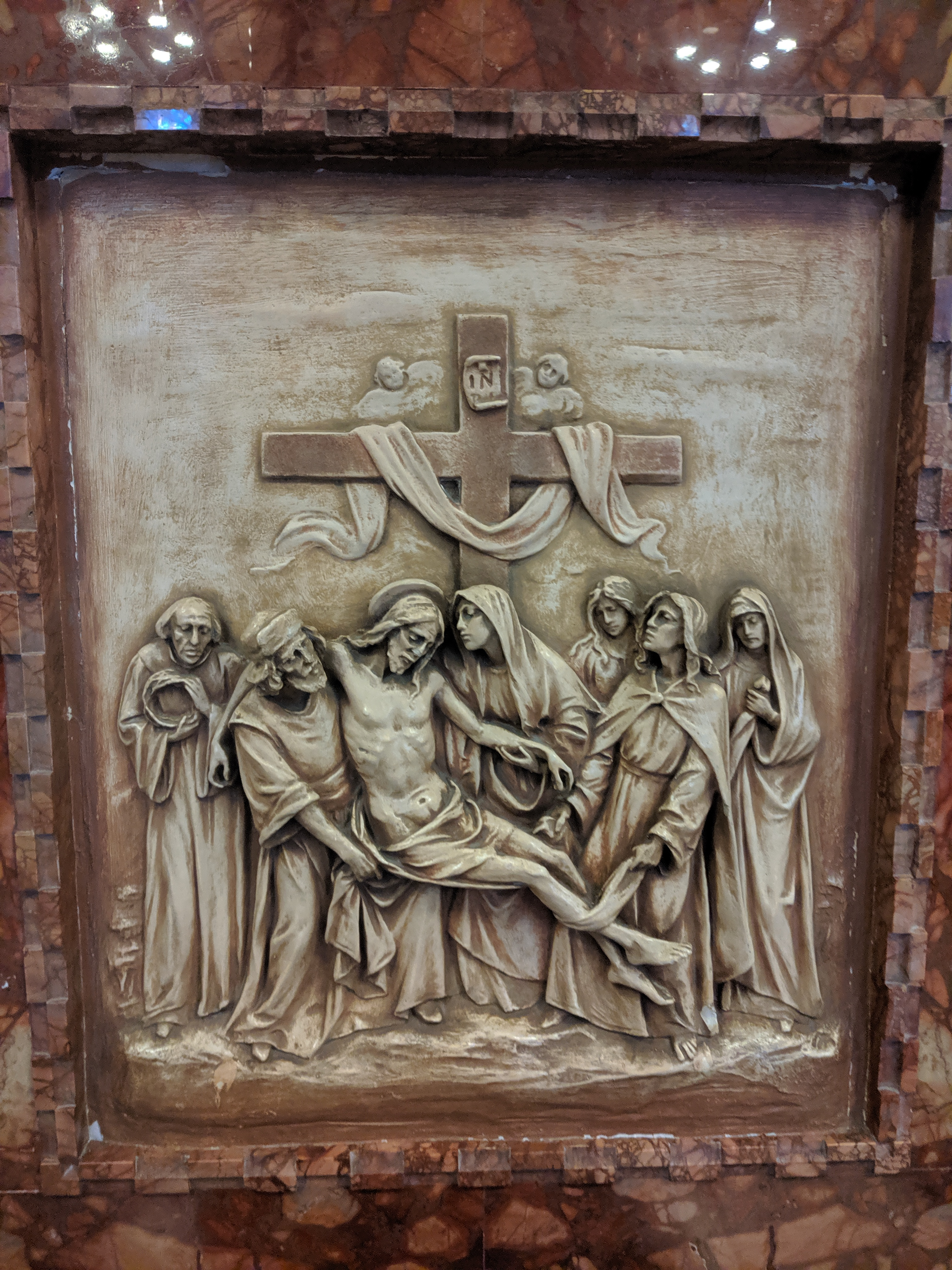
Detail of the fourteenth station of the cross

Many original decorations of the chapel remain such as the Stations of the Cross. A number of artifacts from the seminary are in active use in Catholic churches across the St. Paul area. The altar and baldachin of the seminary chapel are at St. Michael's Church in St. Michael, Minnesota; the chapel statues of Mary and Joseph are at St. John Vianney Seminary; a lectern is at All Saints in Minneapolis; some kneelers, chairs and vestments are at St. Agnes in Frogtown.

=== Mater Dei Chapel ===
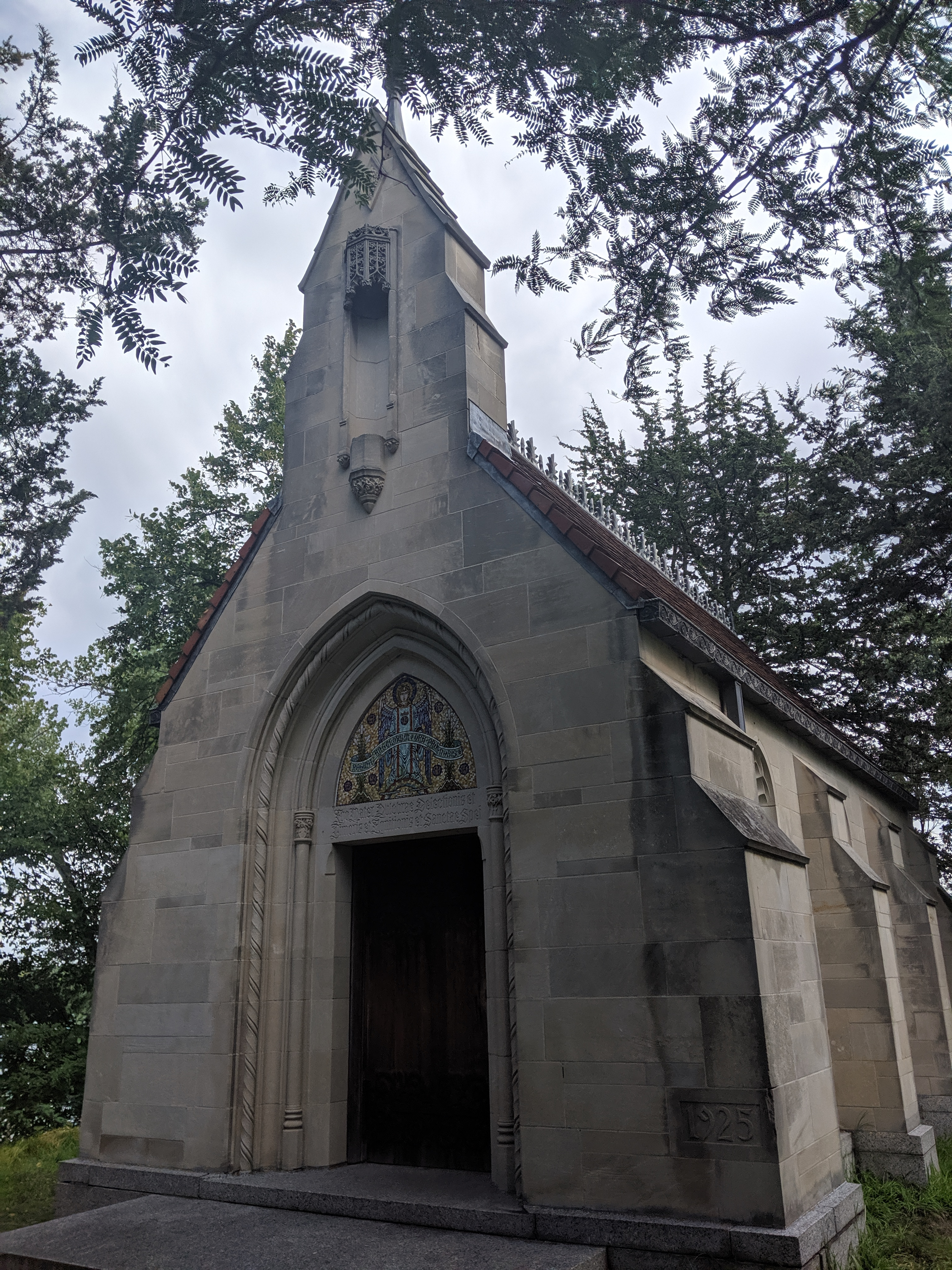
Island Chapel

There is a small chapel, formerly called Mater Dei Chapel in an island in the middle of Lake Johanna. It was originally built in 1925 as a crypt for benefactor Wilhelmine Coolbaugh, who donated the money for its construction herself, with the approval of Archbishop Dowling. However, since then her remains have been removed and reinterred at Resurrection Cemetery in Mendota Heights.

The exterior of the chapel is made with limestone, and above the entrance is a mosaic of an angel holding a scroll with the words "Regina Angelorum ora pro nobis" (transl. Queen of the Angels, pray for us). Directly above the door is the Latin inscription "Ego mater pulchrae delectionis et timoris et agnitionis et sanctae spei" (transl. I am the mother of beautiful delight and of reverence and of knowledge and of holy hope). (Note: In the Vulgate and Douay-Rheims translation, this is a verse is numbered at Sirach (or Ecclesiasticus) 24:24. Other translations may place it at Sirach 24:18, or not include it at all.)

The interior walls are also limestone with a marble floor. Prior to the sale of the seminary, there were stained-glass windows and a triptych of the Archangel Gabriel inside. The triptych above the altar, "The Adoration of the Peasants", was by American painter and muralist Frank H. Schwarz. The stained-glass windows and triptych were removed after the sale, with the triptych being moved to the Byrne residence for retired priests of the archdiocese.

== Notable alumni ==
- James Byrne, auxiliary bishop of St. Paul (1947–1956), bishop of Boise (1956–1962), archbishop of Dubuque (1962–1983)
- Robert James Carlson, auxiliary bishop of Saint Paul and Minneapolis (1983–1994), bishop of Sioux Falls (1995–2004), bishop of Saginaw (2004–2009), and Archbishop of Saint Louis (2009–2020)
- Paul Vincent Dudley, auxiliary bishop of Saint Paul and Minneapolis (1977–1978), and bishop of Sioux Falls (1978–1995)
- Hilary Baumann Hacker, bishop of Bismarck (1957–1982)
- Patrick J. Hessian, 16th Chief of Chaplains of the United States Army
- Michael Joncas, Catholic priest and composer, well known for his hymn, "On Eagle's Wings"
- John Francis Kinney, auxiliary bishop of Saint Paul and Minneapolis (1976–1982), bishop of Bismarck (1982–1995), and bishop of St. Cloud (1995–2013)
- Stephen Kocisko, first Metropolitan Archbishop of the Byzantine Catholic Metropolitan Church of Pittsburgh, the American branch of the Ruthenian Greek Catholic Church (1967–1991)
- Raymond Alphonse Lucker, auxiliary bishop of Saint Paul and Minneapolis (1971–1976) and bishop of New Ulm (1976–2000)
- Ralph McInerny, American novelist
- Richard Pates, auxiliary bishop of Saint Paul and Minneapolis (2000–2008), bishop of Des Moines (2008–2019)
- John Roach, auxiliary bishop of Saint Paul and Minneapolis (1971–1975), and archbishop of Saint Paul and Minneapolis (1975–1995)
- Peter P. Stumpf Jr., American politician and businessman

== Rectors ==
- Father Timothy Crowley: 1923 – 1935
- Father John Cullinan: 1935 – 1940
- Father James Connolly: 1940 – 1943
- Father Thomas Shanahan
- Father Louis McCarthy
- Father James Cecka
- Father John Sankovitz: 1961 – 1965
- Father Richard Moudry: 1965 – 1970
