= Richard Pates =

American prelate of the Catholic Church (born 1943)

His Excellency, The Most Reverend Richard Pates
- Bishop Emeritus of Des Moines
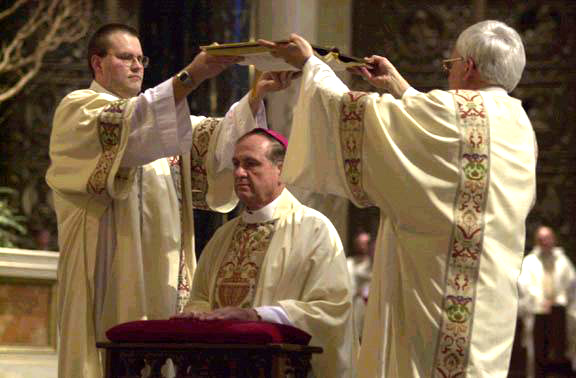
- Pates' episcopal ordination in 2001
- Church: Roman Catholic Church
- Diocese: Des Moines
- Appointed: April 10, 2008
- Installed: May 29, 2008
- Retired: July 18, 2019
- Predecessor: Joseph Charron
- Successor: William M. Joensen
- Other posts: Apostolic Administrator of Crookston (2021); Apostolic Administrator of Dubuque
- Previous posts: Auxiliary Bishop of St. Paul and Minneapolis and Titular Bishop of Suacia (2001-2008); Apostolic Administrator of Joliet (2019–2020)

Orders
- Ordination: December 20, 1968 by Francis Frederick Reh
- Consecration: March 26, 2001 by Harry Joseph Flynn, John Roach, and Frederick F. Campbell

Personal details
- Born: Richard Edmund Pates; February 12, 1943 (age 83) Saint Paul, Minnesota, US
- Education: Nazareth Hall Preparatory Seminary; Saint Paul Seminary; Pontifical North American College; Pontifical Gregorian University

Styles of Richard Edmund Pates
- Reference style: His Excellency; The Most Reverend
- Spoken style: Your Excellency
- Religious style: Bishop

Richard Edmund Pates (born February 12, 1943) is an American Catholic prelate who served as bishop of Des Moines in Iowa from 2008 to 2019 and as an auxiliary bishop of the Archdiocese of St. Paul and Minneapolis in Minnesota from 2000 to 2008.

After his retirement, Pates served as apostolic administrator of both the Diocese of Joliet in Illinois and the Diocese of Crookston in Minnesota for short terms. In 2023, Pope Francis appointed Pates as administrator of the Archdiocese of Dubuque in Iowa due to the abrupt retirement of Archbishop Michael Jackels.

== Biography ==
=== Early life ===
The youngest of three sons, Richard Pates was born on February 12, 1943, to Donald and Lenora Pates in Saint Paul, Minnesota. He attended Nazareth Hall Preparatory Seminary in Saint Paul and St. Paul Seminary, where he earned Bachelor of Philosophy and Bachelor of Latin degrees in 1965. Pates completed his graduate studies in Rome, where he resided at the Pontifical North American College. He received a Licentiate of Sacred Theology from the Pontifical Gregorian University.

=== Early priesthood ===
On December 20, 1968, Pates was ordained to the priesthood for the Archdiocese of St. Paul and Minneapolis by Bishop Francis Reh at St. Peter's Basilica in Rome. After returning to Minnesota in 1968, he was appointed associate pastor at Blessed Sacrament Parish in St. Paul. In 1970, he was named vocation director of the archdiocese holding that position until 1974. Pates also served as a weekend associate pastor at Annunciation Parish in Minneapolis, Minnesota. In 1973, he was named as private secretary to Archbishop Leo Byrne and vice-chancellor of the Archdiocese.

=== Senior priestly postings ===
In 1975, Pates was appointed as secretary of the apostolic delegation to the United States in Washington, D.C.. During this time, he assisted at Blessed Sacrament Parish in Chevy Chase, Maryland The Vatican raised Pates to the rank of chaplain to his holiness in 1979.

In 1981, Pates returned to Saint Paul to become rector of Saint John Vianney College Seminary, a position he would hold until 1987. He was also appointed chaplain of the Serra Club of Midway, Minnesota. In 1987, Pates was appointed vicar for seminaries and pastor of Saint Kevin Parish and the Resurrection Parish, both in Minneapolis. In 1991, the two parishes merged to form Our Lady of Peace Parish, where Pates continued as pastor until 1998.

Pates served as moderator for the archdiocese deaneries, the Council of Catholic Women (1990–1998) and was the founding pastor of Saint Ambrose of Woodbury Parish in St. Paul (1998–2001).

=== Auxiliary Bishop of St. Paul and Minneapolis ===
On December 22, 2000, Pope John Paul II appointed Pates as an auxiliary bishop of St. Paul and Minneapolis and titular bishop of Suacia. He was consecrated on March 26, 2001, by Archbishop Harry Flynn, with Archbishop John Roach and Bishop Frederick Campbell serving as co-consecrators, at the Cathedral of St. Paul in Saint Paul.

As an auxiliary bishop, Pates served as vicar general, vicar for clergy, vicar for youth and young adults, and vicar for evangelization.

=== Bishop of Des Moines ===
On April 10, 2008, Pope Benedict XVI appointed Pates as the ninth bishop of Des Moines. He was installed on May 29, 2008. Pates was the third consecutive Twin Cities' auxiliary bishop to be named bishop Des Moines; his two immediate predecessors, Bishop Joseph Charron and Bishop William Bullock, previously served the St. Paul and Minneapolis Archdiocese.

In November 2011, Pates was elected chair of the United States Conference of Catholic Bishops' (USCCB) Committee on International Justice and Peace at the 2011 meeting. He was elected on a 122–114 vote over Bishop Frank Dewane of the Diocese of Venice in Florida. Pates advocated lifting the Cuban embargo and other restrictions the US Government had placed on Cuba. He called for further dialogue between the two countries, earning some support from Catholics in South Florida.

=== Retirement ===
On February 16, 2018, Pates submitted his letter of resignation as bishop of Des Moines to Pope Francis having reached the canonical retirement age of 75. His successor, Reverend William M. Joensen, was announced in late July 2019.

=== Apostolic administrator ===
On December 27, 2019, Francis named Pates as apostolic administrator of Joliet after Bishop R. Daniel Conlon took medical leave. Pates continued in that role when Conlon retired on May 4, 2020. Pates' responsibilities in Joliet ended when new Bishop Ronald Hicks was installed there on September 29, 2020.

On April 13, 2021, Francis named Pates as apostolic administrator of Crookston. The pope had asked Bishop Michael Hoeppner to resign due to his mishandling of sexual abuse allegations against priests. Pates' term ended on December 6, 2021, with the installation of Auxiliary Bishop Andrew H. Cozzens as bishop of Crookston.

Due to health issues, Archbishop Michael Jackels of Dubuque in April 2023 asked Francis to immediately accept his resignation as archbishop. Francis accepted the resignation on April 4, 2023, and appointed Pates as apostolic administrator of the archdiocese until Thomas Robert Zinkula was appointed the Archbishop on July 26.

Catholic Church titles
Preceded by Joseph Charron	Bishop of Des Moines; 2008-2019	Succeeded by William M. Joensen
Preceded by -	Auxiliary Bishop of Saint Paul and Minneapolis; 2001-2008	Succeeded by -
