= Home Federal Savings and Loan Association of Des Moines Building =

- U.S. National Register of Historic Places
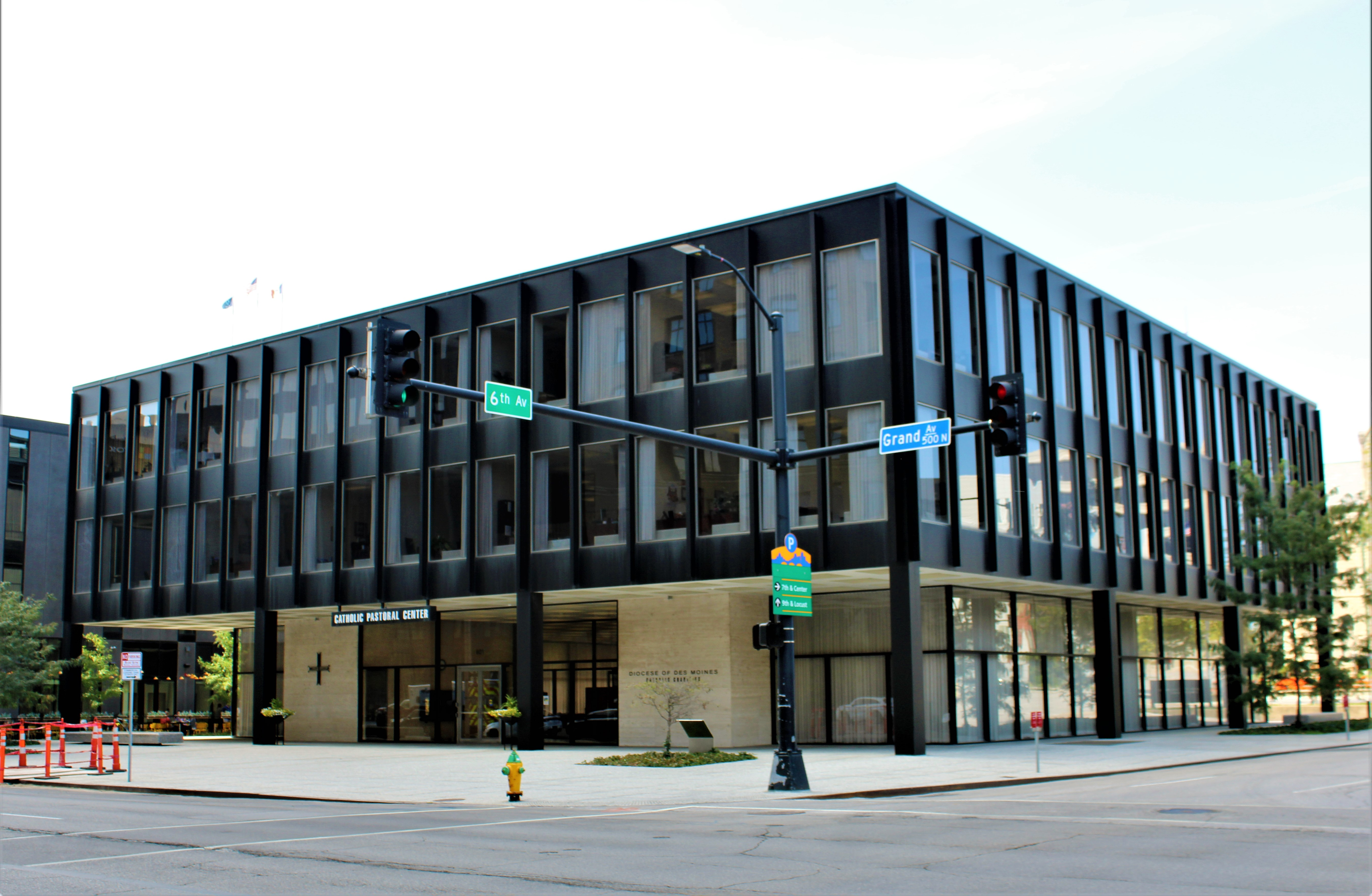
- The building in 2022

- Location within Iowa Location within the United States
- Location: 601 Grand Ave. Des Moines, Iowa
- Coordinates: 41°35′16.9″N 93°37′32.8″W
- Area: less than one acre
- Built: 1962
- Architect: Ludwig Mies van der Rohe
- Architectural style: Modernist
- NRHP reference No.: 100000561
- Added to NRHP: January 24, 2017

The Home Federal Savings and Loan Association of Des Moines Building, also known as American Federal Savings and the Catholic Pastoral Center, is a historic building located in downtown Des Moines, Iowa, United States. Completed in 1962, it is considered to be "one of the most well-known examples of mid-century modern architecture in Des Moines."

It was designed by the prominent Chicago architect Ludwig Mies van der Rohe, and it is one of the first steel and glass modernist buildings in the city's downtown. Initially, the roof was designed to be suspended from two lengthwise trusses, similar van der Rohe's designs at the Illinois Institute of Technology in Chicago. That design was abandoned for a simpler and more direct design that features a steel-frame, glass-infill, and granite and travertine marble on the base. The three-story building rises to the height of 40.25 feet (12.27 m).

It was built for the Home Federal Savings and Loan Association of Des Moines and later American Federal Savings, which failed in 1990 amid the country's savings and loan crisis. There was concern that the building would be torn down, so the Des Moines City Council designated it as a local landmark. In 1992 philanthropist Ed Ochylski acquired it and donated it to the Diocese of Des Moines, which converted it into its headquarters. From 2016 to 2017, the building underwent a $10 million renovation. It was listed on the National Register of Historic Places in 2017.
