= Maurice John Dingman =

American Catholic bishop (1914–1992)

His Excellency, The Most Reverend Maurice John Dingman
- Bishop of Des Moines
- Church: Roman Catholic Church
- See: Diocese of Des Moines
- In office: April 2, 1968 – October 14, 1986
- Predecessor: George Biskup
- Successor: William Henry Bullock

Orders
- Ordination: December 8, 1939 by Ralph Leo Hayes
- Consecration: June 19, 1968 by Luigi Raimondi

Personal details
- Born: January 20, 1914 St. Paul, Iowa, US
- Died: February 1, 1992 (aged 78) Des Moines, Iowa, US
- Education: St. Ambrose College; Pontifical North American College; Pontifical Gregorian University; Catholic University of America
- Motto: Ecclesia Agricultura (Church and farming)

Maurice John Dingman (January 20, 1914 – February 1, 1992) was an American Catholic bishop. He served as bishop of Des Moines in Iowa from 1968 to 1986.

== Early life ==
Maurice John Dingman was born on January 20, 1914, on a farm near St. Paul, Iowa, to Theodore and Angela (née Witte) Dingman. He attended St. Ambrose College in Davenport before studying in Rome at the Pontifical North American College and the Pontifical Gregorian University.

== Priesthood ==
Dingman was ordained to the priesthood for the Diocese of Davenport on December 8, 1939, by Bishop Ralph Hayes in the Chapel of Our Lady of Humility at the North American College. Upon his return to Iowa, he taught at St. Ambrose Academy in Davenport from 1940 until 1943, when he became assistant chancellor of the diocese and Bishop Henry Rohlman's secretary.

Dingman earned a Licentiate of Canon Law from the Catholic University of America at Washington, DC, in 1946. From 1946 to 1953, he served as principal of Bishop Hayes High School in Muscatine, Iowa. He was later named superintendent of Catholic schools and chancellor of the diocese. Dingman also served as chaplain at Ottumwa Naval Air Station and the Congregation of the Humility of Mary Motherhouse, both in Ottumwa, Iowa. He was also chaplain at Regina Coeli Monastery in Bettendorf, Iowa, and Mercy Hospital in Davenport, Iowa.

== Bishop of Des Moines ==
On April 2, 1968, Dingman was appointed as the sixth bishop of Des Moines by Pope Paul VI. He received his episcopal ordination on June 19, 1968, at Sacred Heart Cathedral in Davenport from Archbishop Luigi Raimondi. Bishops Ralph Hayes and Gerald O'Keefe were the co-consecrators. Dingman's episcopal ordination was one of the first celebrated in the diocese in the vernacular. He was installed at St. Ambrose Cathedral in Des Moines on July 7, 1968. A mass followed at Veterans Memorial Auditorium in Des Moines

Dingman became known as a champion of rural issues and ecumenism, and strengthened the laity, priests, and nuns of the diocese. He supported nuclear disarmament and was open to discussion on the subject of women's ordination. From 1976 to 1979, he served as president of the National Catholic Rural Life Conference.

On October 4, 1979, Pope John Paul II visited the Diocese of Des Moines on the suggestion of Joe Hays, a farmer in Truro, Iowa, and on the invitation of Dingman. After landing at the Des Moines International Airport, the pope visited the rural parish of St. Patrick near the historic village of Irish Settlement. He then celebrated a mass at the Living History Farms in Urbandale, Iowa.

In 1983, Dingman was abducted by gunpoint by two juveniles, who demanded money from him. After discovering Dingman had none, they transported him to Waterloo, Iowa. Dingman was freed unharmed and the juveniles were arrested. During their trial, Dingman advocated for them to the court..

== Later life and death ==
On April 17, 1986, Dingman suffered a massive stroke in his kitchen. He recuperated at his family home in St. Paul. On October 14, 1986, Pope John Paul II accepted Dingman's resignation as bishop of Des Moines due to poor health. For his life work as an advocate for peace and justice issues, Dingman received the 1986 Pacem in Terris Peace and Freedom Award, sponsored in part by the Diocese of Davenport and St. Ambrose College.

Maurice Dingman died on February 1, 1992, at Mercy Hospital in Des Moines. His funeral was celebrated at St. Ambrose Cathedral, and he was buried in Glendale Cemetery in Des Moines.
