= Austin Dowling =

American prelate (1868–1930)

His Excellency, The Most Reverend Daniel Austin Dowling
- Archbishop of St. Paul
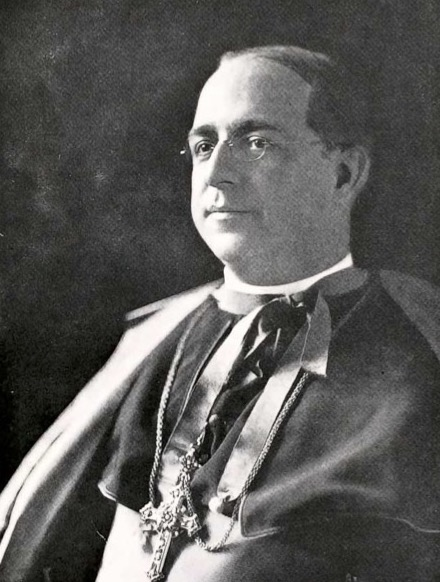
- See: Archdiocese of St. Paul
- Installed: March 25, 1919
- Term ended: November 29, 1930
- Predecessor: John Ireland
- Successor: John Murray
- Previous post: Bishop of Des Moines (1912 to 1919)

Orders
- Ordination: June 24, 1891 by Matthew Harkins
- Consecration: April 25, 1912 by Matthew Harkins

Personal details
- Born: April 6, 1868 New York City, New York, US
- Died: November 29, 1930 (age 62) Saint Paul, Minnesota, US
- Education: Manhattan College; Saint John's Seminary; Catholic University of America
- Motto: In loco pascuae me collocavit (He placed me in a pasture)
- Coat of arms

Daniel Austin Dowling (April 6, 1868 – November 29, 1930) was an American prelate of the Roman Catholic Church who served as the second archbishop of what was then the Archdiocese of Saint Paul in Minnesota from 1919 until his death.

Dowling served as the first bishop of the Diocese of Des Moines in Iowa from 1912 to 1919.

== Background ==
Daniel Dowling was born in New York City on April 6, 1868, to Daniel and Mary Teresa (née Santry) Dowling. On April 19 was baptized and given his Christian name, Daniel Austin. When Dowling was a child, his family moved to Newport, Rhode Island. He attended Academy of the Sisters of Mercy in Newport.

Dowling went to New York City to enter Manhattan College, graduating with an A.B. with high honors in 1887. Dowling started his theological studies at St. John's Seminary in Boston, Massachusetts.

== Career ==
=== Priesthood ===
Dowling was ordained to the priesthood in Providence, Rhode Island, by Bishop Matthew A. Harkins on June 24, 1891, for the Diocese of Providence. After his ordination, Dowling was sent to Washington, D.C. to work on his graduate studies in theology and church history at the Catholic University of America. After serving one year as a pastor at a parish in Warren, Rhode Island, Dowling returned to St. John's Seminary to teach church history for two years. Author Marvin O'Connell described Dowling as

"...a man who was by taste, habit and profession an historian; he could not set about finding solutions to problems facing him until he examined those problems in the light of the past."

In 1896, Dowling spent two years as editor of the Providence Visitor, building a reputation as a Catholic editor in the United States. After leaving the newspaper, he was assigned as assistant pastor at St. Joseph's Parish in Providence, Rhode Island, then as pastor of St. Mary's Parish in Warren, Rhode Island. Dowling was later named as rector of the Cathedral of Saints Peter and Paul in Providence.

=== Bishop of Des Moines ===
On January 31, 1912, Pope Pius X appointed Dowling as bishop of Des Moines. He was consecrated by Bishop Harkins on April 25, 1912, at the Cathedral of Saints Peter and Paul in Providence. Dowling's peers saw the appointment as recognition of his talents, while Dowling felt as if he were being sent into "exile" in the American West. In 1918, Des Moines Catholic College was founded by Dowling.

=== Archbishop of Saint Paul ===
On January 31, 1919, Pope Benedict XV appointed Dowling as archbishop of St. Paul. In his address at his installation on March 25, 1919, Dowling described himself as "the unknown, the unexpected, [and] the undistinguished successor of the great Archbishop Ireland."

In the decade that followed, Dowling established the Archbishop Ireland's Education Fund, improved St. Paul Seminary, and was on the board of Education of the National Catholic Welfare Council (or "NCWC," now known as the United States Conference of Catholic Bishops or USCCB). He was known for his contributions to education and love of Church history. Specifically, author Marvin O'Connell credited Dowling as "one of the leading lights" from the NCWC's inception, who headed NCWC's education department, which put him in direct contact with the Catholic Education Association.

== Personal life and death ==
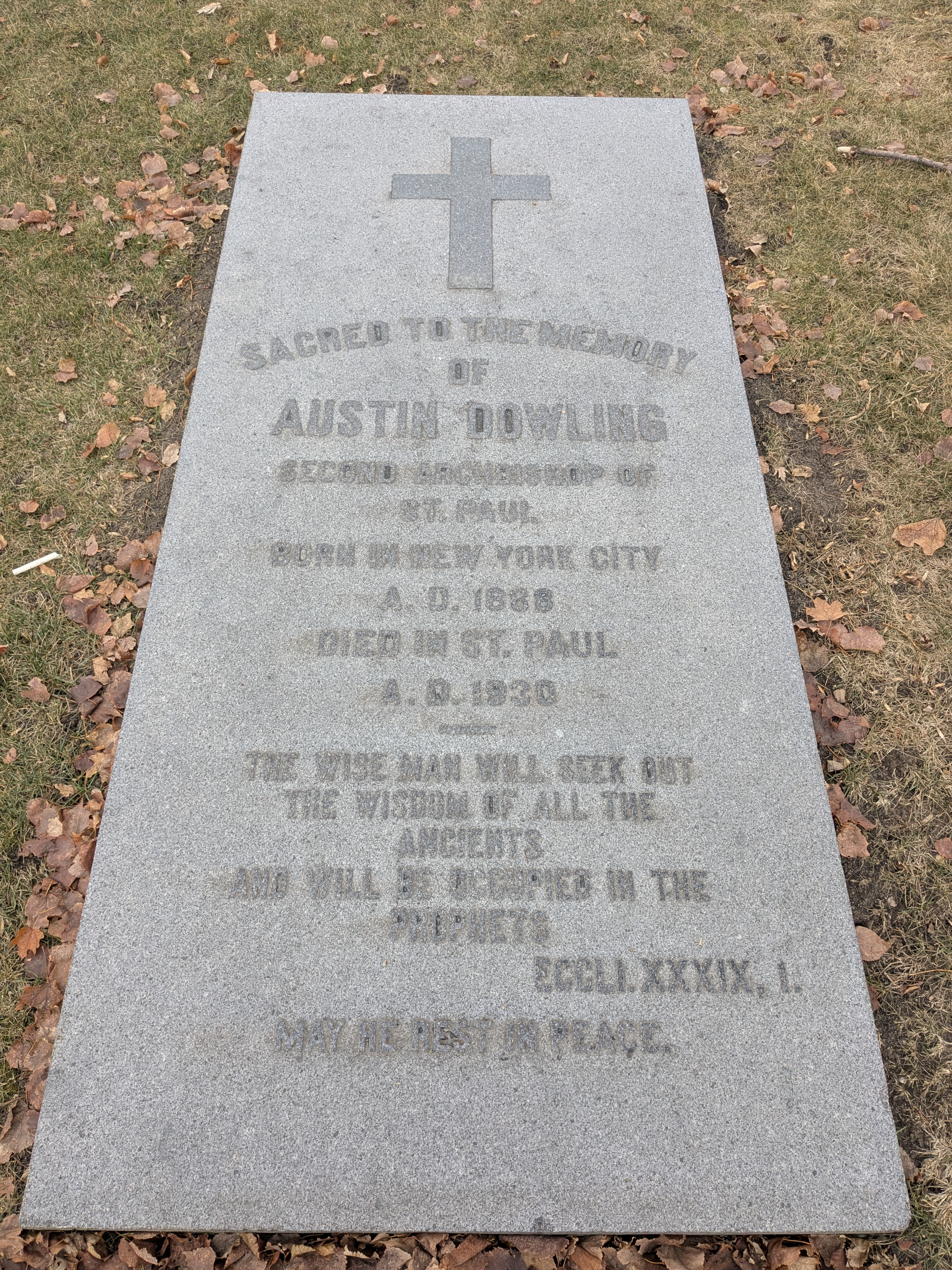
The grave of Archbishop Dowling, Calvary Cemetery, St. Paul, Minnesota (2024)

During the last years of his life, Dowling's health was seriously impaired due to heart disease. During the summer of 1929, he collapsed while on a confirmation tour and became critically ill. For a time he recovered to the point that he was able to walk on his own, but pneumonia developed.

Austin Dowling died age 62 on November 29, 1930, in St. Paul. He was buried at Calvary Cemetery.

== Viewpoints ==
=== Immigrants and the church ===
"In the first decade of the 20th century, immigration jumped from a low of 3.5 million in that decade to a high of 9 million due to the depression of the 1890s. After 1914, immigration dropped off because of the war, and later because of immigration restrictions imposed in the 1920s." Dowling described the challenge for Catholics in the post-World War I era as follows:

The old order passeth, giving place to the new. Immigration has all but ceased, and when revived—if it is ever permitted to revive—it is not likely to attain the proportions of the former days. …Language, customs, memories, pass with a generation. So far, the Church in this country has been singularly sustained by the momentum of spiritual agencies that were derived from other lands and other times. In the new day there will be no such powerful auxiliary to supplement our own normal activity. It will be the American Catholic Church or it will be nothing.

— Archbishop Austin Dowling,

The challenge for American Catholics during the 1920s was that immigrants came to America poor and disadvantaged and they associated the catholic religion with their old countries. As immigrants improved their quality of life and became more "American," culture and religion was lost and forgotten. Dowling summarized it best saying, "as they progress in wealth and station they frequently strive to hide their origins, to change their names and affect manners that do not belong to them. Even when they keep up the practice of their religion, they are frequently ashamed of it."

Dowling argued that the solution would be to convince people that "foreignism" and Catholicism were not intimately linked. World War I provided opportunity for Catholics to prove their patriotism. The National Catholic War Council was established to coordinate programs for chaplains and refugees, and develop ecumenical and interfaith relations.

== Legacy ==
Des Moines Catholic College was later renamed Dowling Catholic High School in his honor. In 1937, N 38th Avenue in Minneapolis was renamed to Dowling Avenue after him.

=== Archbishop Ireland Educational Fund ===
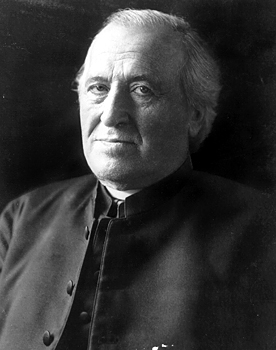
Archbishop John Ireland

At the first anniversary requiem for his predecessor, Archbishop John Ireland, Dowling established the Archbishop Ireland Educational Fund. He said that the present needs for education were "to develop, coordinate and consolidate the education system to provide for greater efficiency." To accomplish this goal, Dowling announced a campaign to raise $5,000,000.

By September 1925, 45,551 people had pledged a total of $4,392,872.50. The average individual pledge was around $100. Major allocations from the fund included $200,000 to the endowment fund of the College of St. Catherine in St. Paul and $150,000 to St. Thomas College.

The largest allocation was $1,280,000 for the "construction and partial endowment of the preparatory seminary known as Nazareth Hall. "It was built on property on the shore of Lake Johanna. Reardon describes Dowling's relationship with Nazareth Hall:

Nazareth Hall was the apple of his eye and woe betide the priest or layman who dared to utter an uncomplimentary syllable about the institution, its architecture, location, purpose, faculty, or product. Every other institution in the diocese was a step-child, seldom visited except officially. At Nazareth Hall a suite of well-furnished rooms was set apart for him to which he retired from time to time to rest and recuperate and breathe the invigorating suburban air.

=== St. Paul Seminary ===
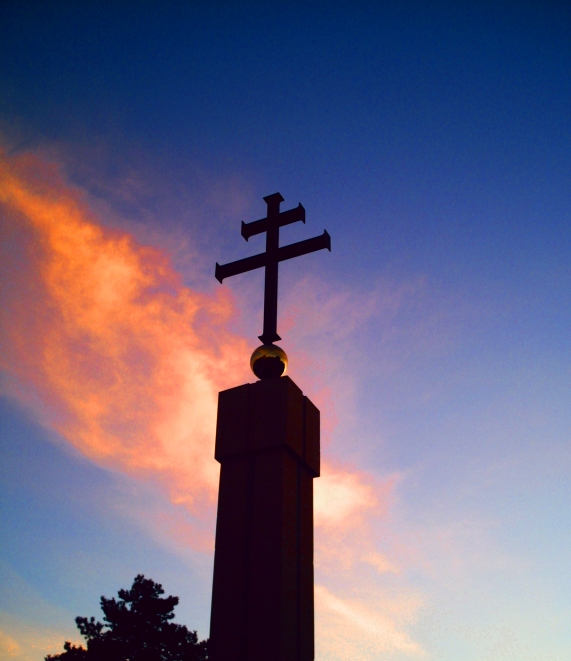
St. Paul Seminary's Metropolitan Cross

The establishment of Nazareth Hall had a large impact on the St. Paul Seminary. Thereafter, the majority of the students would be prepared in a cloistered environment, which Dowling believed was more appropriate than a college campus. Dowling believed that the priest of the future "should be armed before to overcome the temptations of the times," and that the best was to do that was to ground them on the firm foundation of interior life and school them in the practice of priestly virtues.

Dowling also believed in the rigors of academic challenge, from his years at St. John's Seminary. To create the strong theological factory he desired, Dowling appointed Humphrey Moynihan as rector of the Saint Paul Seminary. Moynihan emphasized culture and refinement in his teaching.

Dowling had a personal interest in the seminarians attending the school. It was said that he had "a keen eye for every candidate for the priesthood." In fact, he knew many of the boys at Nazareth Hall as well as their teachers knew them. Many felt that his influence on their lives continued on after their leaving Saint Paul Seminary, to ordination and beyond.

== See also ==
- Catholic Church hierarchy
- Catholic Church in the United States
- Historical list of the Catholic bishops of the United States
- History of Saint Paul, Minnesota
- List of Catholic bishops of the United States
- Lists of patriarchs, archbishops, and bishops

== Episcopal succession ==
Catholic Church titles
| Preceded by John Ireland | Archbishop of Saint Paul and Minneapolis; 1919–1930 | Succeeded by John Gregory Murray |
| Preceded by None | Bishop of Des Moines; 1911–1919 | Succeeded by Thomas William Drumm |
