= Joseph Charron =

American prelate

His Excellency, The Most Reverend Joseph Léo Charron C.PP.S.
- Bishop Emeritus of Des Moines; Titular Bishop of Bencenna
- Church: Latin Church
- Diocese: Des Moines
- Appointed: November 12, 1993
- Installed: January 21, 1994
- Retired: April 10, 2007
- Predecessor: William Henry Bullock
- Successor: Richard Pates
- Previous post: Auxiliary Bishop of Saint Paul and Minneapolis and Titular Bishop of Bencenna (1990-1994)

Orders
- Ordination: June 3, 1967 by Edward A. McCarthy
- Consecration: January 25, 1990 by John Robert Roach, John Francis Kinney, and Thomas C. Kelly

Personal details
- Born: December 30, 1939 (age 86) Redfield, South Dakota, US
- Education: University of Dayton; Lateran University; Academia Alfonsiana

Joseph Léo Charron C.PP.S. is an American prelate of the Roman Catholic Church. Charron served as bishop of the Diocese of Des Moines in Iowa from 1994 to 2007 and as an auxiliary bishop of the Archdiocese of Saint Paul and Minneapolis in Minnesota from 1990 to 1994. He is a member of the Missionaries of the Precious Blood.

== Biography ==
=== Early life ===
Joseph Charron was born in Redfield, South Dakota, on December 30, 1939. He is one of eight children. Charron made his religious profession as a member of the Missionaries of the Precious Blood on August 15, 1961.

Charron received his Bachelor of Theology degree in 1963 and his Master of Theology degree in 1966 from the University of Dayton in Dayton, Ohio. He earned a Licentiate in Sacred Theology at the Pontifical Lateran University in Rome in 1968, and a doctorate at the Academia Alfonsiana in Rome in 1970.

=== Priesthood ===
On June 3, 1967, Charron was ordained to the priesthood for the Missionaries of the Sacred Blood by Bishop Edward A. McCarthy in Carthagena, Ohio. In 1970, the Missionaries assigned Charron as an assistant professor of theology at St. John's University in St. Joseph, Minnesota. In 1976, he became assistant general secretary and associate general secretary of the United States Catholic Conference and the National Conference of Catholic Bishops.

In 1979, Charron was appointed provincial director of the Kansas City Province of the Missionaries. Charron returned to St. John's University in 1987, becoming an adjunct professor of theology.

=== Auxiliary Bishop of Saint Paul and Minneapolis ===
On November 12, 1989, Pope John Paul II appointed Charron as an auxiliary bishop of Saint Paul and Minneapolis and titular bishop of Bencenna. He was consecrated at the Cathedral of Saint Paul in St. Paul, Minnesota, on January 25, 1990, by Archbishop John Roach.

=== Bishop of Des Moines ===
On January 21, 1994, John Paul II appointed Charron as bishop of Des Moines. On September 19, 2003, Charron permanently suspended three diocese priests from ministry due to sexual abuse allegations: Reverends Albert Wilwerding, John Ryan, and Richard Wagner. Charron was following the recommendations of an internal committee that had recommended their dismissal and ultimate laicization.

On April 10, 2007, Pope Benedict XVI accepted Charron's resignation due to poor health as bishop of Des Moines. Charron had been diagnosed with polymyalgia rheumatica, a chronic medical condition.

== See also ==
- Catholic Church hierarchy
- Catholic Church in the United States
- Historical list of the Catholic bishops of the United States
- List of Catholic bishops of the United States
- Lists of patriarchs, archbishops, and bishops

Catholic Church titles
Preceded by William Henry Bullock	Bishop of Des Moines; 1994-2007	Succeeded by Richard Pates
