= Diocese of Des Moines =

Latin Catholic ecclesiastical jurisdiction in Iowa, USA

Diocese of Des Moines Diœcesis Desmoinensis
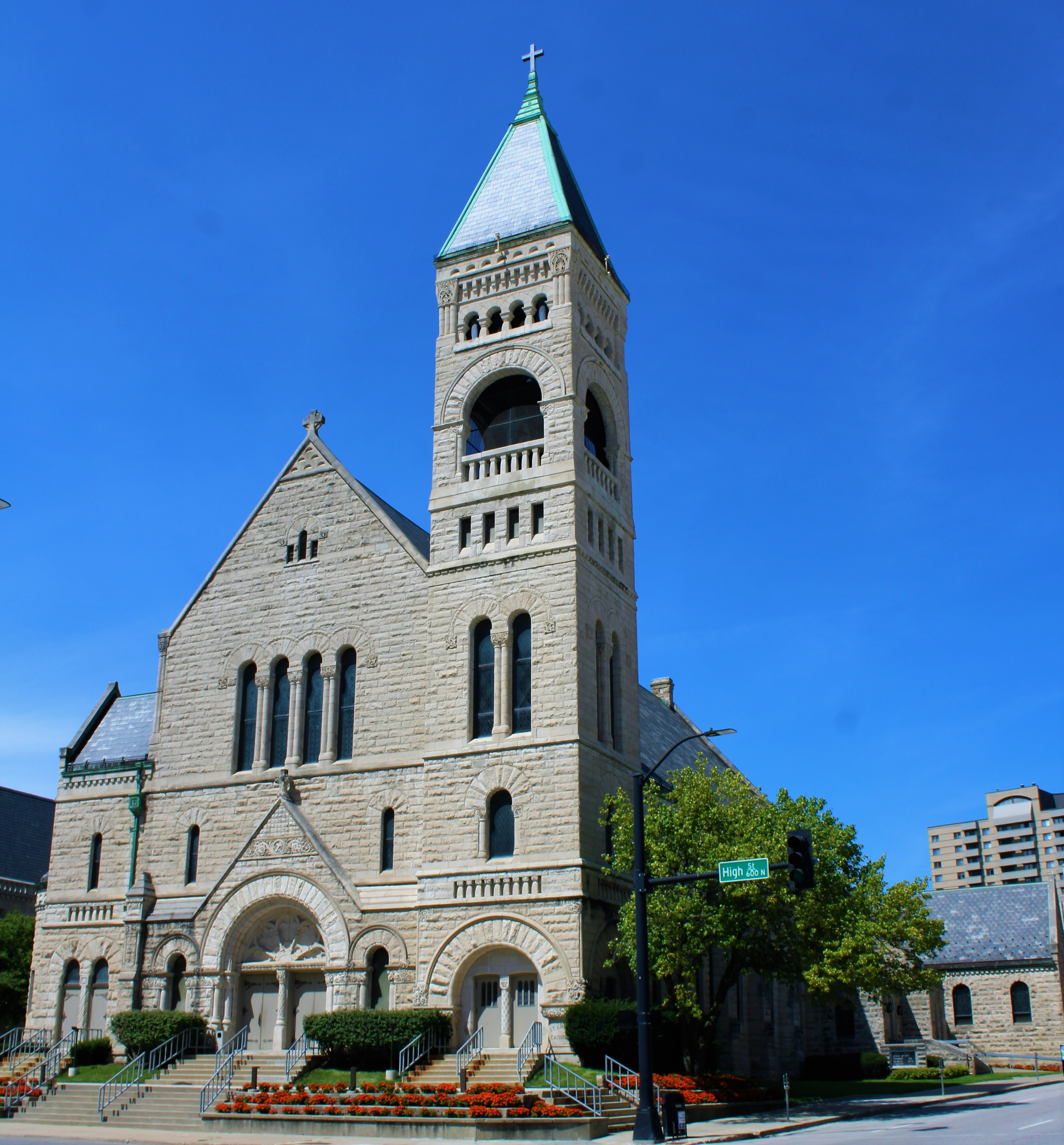
- St. Ambrose Cathedral

- Coat of arms

Location
- Country: United States
- Territory: 23 counties in the Southwest quadrant of Iowa
- Ecclesiastical province: Dubuque
- Coordinates: 41°35′19″N 93°37′32″W

Statistics
- Area: 12,446 sq mi (32,230 km^{2})
- Population: Total; Catholics: (as of 2013); 837,773; 103,430 (12.3%)
- Parishes: 79

Information
- Denomination: Catholic
- Sui iuris church: Latin Church
- Rite: Roman Rite
- Established: August 12, 1911 (115 years ago)
- Cathedral: Saint Ambrose Cathedral
- Patron saint: Mary, Queen of Heaven; Pope Pius X

Current leadership
- Pope: Leo XIV
- Bishop: William Michael Joensen
- Metropolitan Archbishop: Thomas Robert Zinkula
- Bishops emeritus: Joseph Leo Charron; Richard Pates

Map
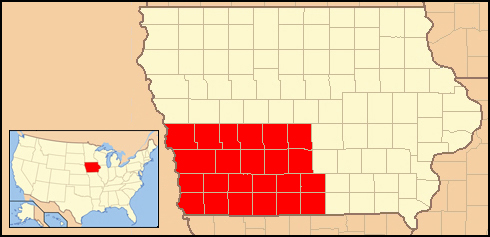

Website
- dmdiocese.org

The Diocese of Des Moines (Latin: Diœcesis Desmoinensis) is a Catholic diocese in southwestern Iowa in the United States. It is a suffragan see in the ecclesiastical province of the metropolitan Archdiocese of Dubuque. The cathedral is St. Ambrose in Des Moines. William Joensen is bishop.

== History ==
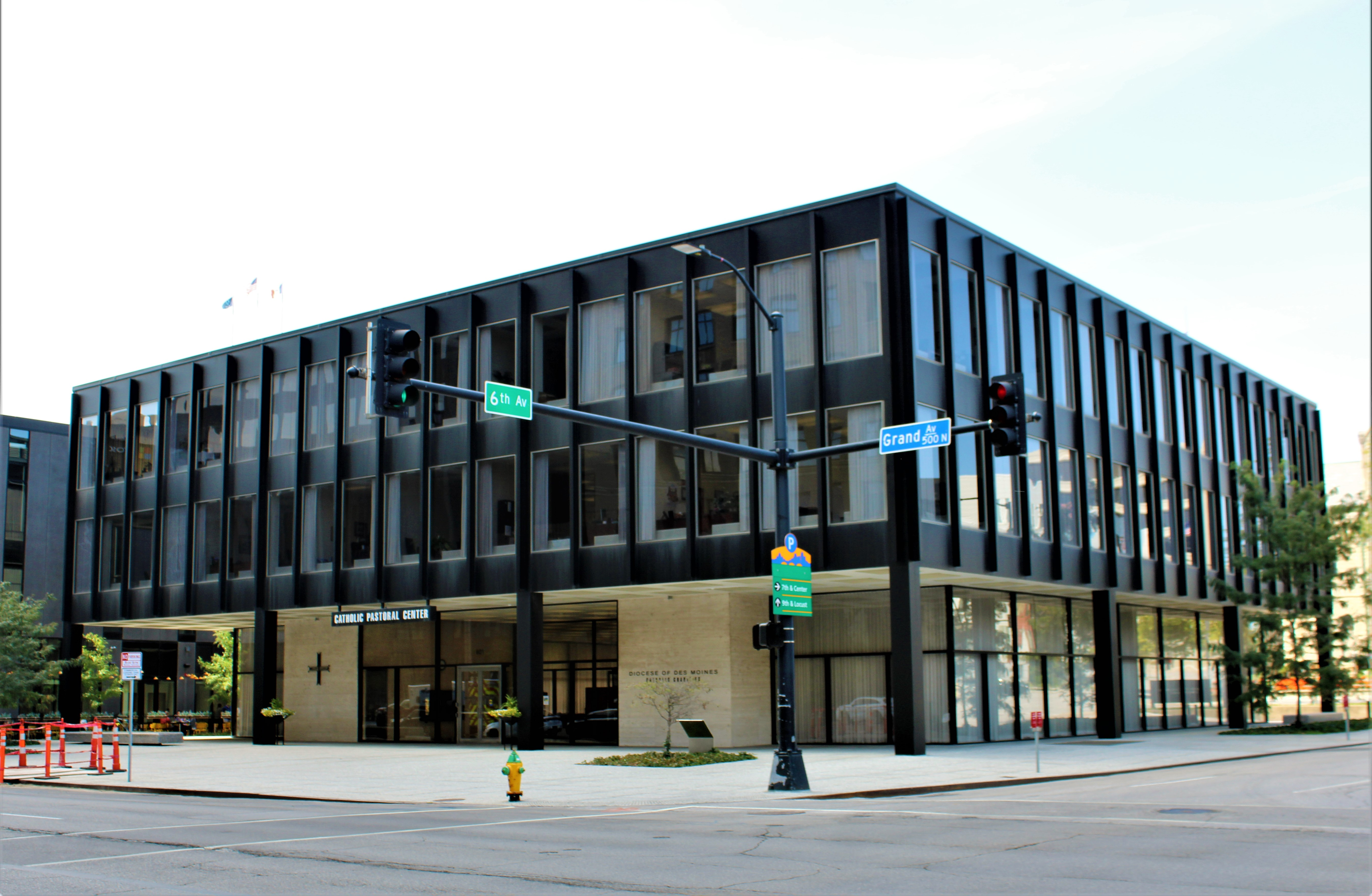
Catholic Pastoral Center, Des Moines, Iowa (2022)

=== 1830 to 1900 ===
During the 1830s, the Society of Jesus started sending missionary priests into present-day Iowa to build missions and evangelize the Native American populations. At that time, there were very few European immigrants living in the region. In 1834, the Vatican created the Diocese of St. Louis, with jurisdiction over vast areas of the Great Plains.

On July 28, 1837, Pope Gregory XVI erected the new Diocese of Dubuque. This diocese initially included all of Iowa and the Wisconsin Territory. The Jesuit leadership in St. Louis in 1838 sent the missionary priest Pierre-Jean De Smet to the Potawatomie lands near present-day Council Bluffs to build the first Catholic church and school in the Upper Missouri Valley. Due to attacks by Sioux tribesmen, the project was abandoned in 1841.

By 1850, the Diocese of Dubuque only included the state of Iowa. The first mass in the future city of Des Moines was celebrated in a log hut in 1851 at Fort Des Moines by Alexander Hattenberger, a priest from Ottumwa, Iowa. In 1856, St. Ambrose Church was built in Des Moines, the first in that community.

In the late 19th century, Bishop John Hennessy of Dubuque petitioned the Vatican to create a separate diocese for southern Iowa. While he envisioned Des Moines as the see city for this new diocese, in 1881 the Vatican instead erected the Diocese of Davenport, including the Des Moines area.The Sisters of Mercy in 1887 opened St. Bernard's Hospital in Council Bluffs. Today it is CHI Mercy Council Bluffs. The Sisters in 1895 founded Mercy Hospital in Des Moines. Today it is MercyOne.

In 1899, the doctors of Dubuque founded the Mercy Des Moines School of Nursing in Des Moines. It is today the Mercy College of Health Sciences.

=== 1900 to 1967 ===
On August 12, 1911, Pope Pius X erected the new Diocese of Des Moines with territory from the Diocese of Davenport. Saint Ambrose Parish church became the cathedral for the new diocese. The pope in 1912 appointed Austin Dowling of the Diocese of Providence as the first bishop of Des Moines. In 1918, Dowling founded Des Moines Catholic College. A year later, Pope Benedict XV named Dowling as archbishop of the Archdiocese of St. Paul.St. John's Church in Des Moines was dedicated in 1927.

To replace Dowling in Des Moines, Benedict XV named Thomas Drumm of Dubuque in 1919. Drumm died in 1933. In 1934, Gerald Bergan was appointed the third bishop of Des Moines by Pope Pius XI. He established a diocesan newspaper called The Messenger. Pope Pius XII named Bergan as archbishop of the Archdiocese of Omaha in 1948. Bergan's replacement in Des Moines was Edward Daly, named by the pope that same year. Daly died in 1964.

Auxiliary Bishop George Biskup of the Archdiocese of Dubuque was named by Pope Paul VI as the fifth bishop of Des Moines in 1965. In 1966, Biskup purchased 55 acres (220,000 m^{2}) from the Des Moines Golf and Country Club in West Des Moines to construct Dowling Catholic High School. He also started to implement the liturgical changes from the Second Vatican Council reforms of the early 1960s.

=== 1967 to present ===
In 1967, after Biskup was in Des Moines for only two years, Paul VI appointed him as coadjutor archbishop for the Archdiocese of Indianapolis. In 1968, the pope named Maurice Dingman as the next bishop of Des Moines. In 1979, while on his American tour, Pope John Paul II visited the diocese on the suggestion of Joe Hays, a farmer in Truro and on the invitation of Dingman. After arriving in Des Moines, the pope visited St. Patrick Parish near Irish Settlement. He then celebrated a mass at the Living History Farms in Urbandale before leaving Iowa. Dingman retired as bishop of Des Moines due to bad health in 1986.

In 1987, Auxiliary Bishop William Bullock from the Archdiocese of Saint Paul and Minneapolis named bishop of Des Moines by Pope John Paul II. The Vatican in 1989 elevated St. John's Church in Des Moines to a minor basilica, making the Basilica of St. John.

Bullock was transferred to the Diocese of Madison in 1993.Auxiliary Bishop Joseph Charron from Saint Paul and Minneapolis succeeded Bullock in 1994. Charron retired in 2007.

In 2008, Pope Benedict XVI appointed Auxiliary Bishop Richard Pates from Saint Paul and Minneapolis as bishop of Des Moines. In 2010, the diocese lost $600,000 to a cybercrime attack. The FBI ultimately recovered $180,000 for the diocese. Pates resigned as bishop of Saint Paul and Des Moines in 2018.

Pope Francis in 2019 named William Joensen of Dubuque as the next bishop of Des Moines. In January 2023, the diocese released new policies on the treatment of transgender individuals in diocesan churches, schools, and other facilities.The diocese in 2024 requested that Prairie Fire Ministries, a healing ministry, temporarily suspend their monthly services at St. Ambrose Cathedral due to "canonical concerns".

== Reports of sex abuse ==
In 2003, Bishop Charron permanently suspended three diocesan priests from ministry due to sexual abuse allegations: Albert Wilwerding, John Ryan, and Richard Wagner. Charron was following the recommendations of an internal committee that had recommended their dismissal.

In 2015, Pope Francis laicized Howard Fitzgerald, a priest who was credibly accused of sexually abusing a minor in the previous decades. Fitzgerald had been placed on administrative leave in 2014. In April 2019, Bishop Pates released a list of nine diocesan priests with credible accusations of sexual abuse of minors.

== Bishops ==
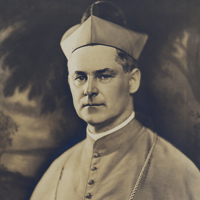
Bishop Drumm (1919)

=== Bishops of Des Moines ===
1. Austin Dowling (1912–1919), appointed Archbishop of Saint Paul
2. Thomas William Drumm (1919–1933)
3. Gerald Thomas Bergan (1934–1948), appointed Archbishop of Omaha
4. Edward Celestin Daly (1948–1964)
5. George Biskup (1965–1967), appointed Coadjutor Archbishop and later Archbishop of Indianapolis
6. Maurice John Dingman (1968–1986)
7. William Henry Bullock (1987–1993), appointed Bishop of Madison
8. Joseph Charron (1993–2007)
9. Richard Pates (2008–2019)
10. William Michael Joensen (2019–present)

=== Other priests of this diocese who became bishop ===
John Joseph Boylan, appointed Bishop of Rockford in 1942

== Education ==
As of 2026, there are 16 Catholic schools in the Diocese of Des Moines, with approximately 6,600 students.

=== High schools ===
School	Location	Mascot
Dowling Catholic High School	West Des Moines	Maroons
Saint Albert High School	Council Bluffs	Falcons
