= Thomas E. Drumm =

Thomas E. Drumm (1909-1990) was a government official who specialized in U.S. government relations with private industry.

== Military career ==
In June 1941 Drumm joined the U.S. Army as an enlisted man, and was commissioned a lieutenant in January 1943. He spent most of the war assigned to the Second Service Command of the Army Service Forces at Governor’s Island, New York. His job was to screen civilian applicants for sensitive positions in privately operated war plants. He also helped make arrangements for visiting dignitaries, and participated in the ceremonies associated with Dwight D. Eisenhower’s homecoming visit to New York in June 1945. In July 1945 Drumm became an aide to General Jacob Devers, Commander of the Army Ground Forces, and worked at the Pentagon until his discharge in May 1946.

== Government career ==
After his discharge, Drumm obtained a job at the War Assets Administration, an agency responsible for disposing of surplus property acquired by the U.S. government during World War II. Drumm worked as an assistant to the WAA administrator, General Robert Littlejohn, and also in the Office of Real Property Disposal, the branch of WAA that disposed of surplus industrial plants and real estate.

The WAA was abolished in June 1949 and Drumm transferred to the Department of Defense. He spent the summer and fall of 1949 making a survey of management practices at the Army Corps of Engineers. In December 1949 he was sent to London, England, where he joined the staff of the North Atlantic Defense Production Board. The Board was a NATO agency that helped coordinate defense production by NATO countries. The Board was dissolved in May 1952 and Drumm was transferred to Paris where he worked briefly for the U.S. Special Representative, Europe.

In late 1952 Drumm returned to Washington, D.C., and assumed a position with the Foreign Operations Administration where he worked until 1954. He then worked for the Bureau of the Budget on projects involving the disposal of surplus real property. In 1958 he transferred to the Business and Defense Services Administration, a branch of the Department of Commerce, where he served as Assistant Administrator and Administrator.

In early 1962 Drumm was sent to France where he served as Counselor for Commercial Affairs at the U.S. Embassy in Paris. In this position he collected information on French business developments which he reported to the Departments of State and Commerce. He also assisted U.S. companies that were interested in doing business in France, and French companies that were interested in doing business in the U.S.

In 1967 Drumm returned to the United States and served in the Office of Field Services in the Department of Commerce. This office coordinated the work of various field offices in the United States that provided information to domestic businesses. In 1971 Maurice Stans, the Secretary of Commerce, appointed Drumm the first Ombudsman for Business. As ombudsman, Drumm helped private businesses in their dealings with various U.S. government agencies.

== Later career ==
Drumm retired from government service in July 1973 and went to work for Macmillan, Inc., a New York City publishing company specializing in non-fiction and educational works. Drumm was placed in charge of Macmillan’s Washington, DC, office. He was responsible for handling Macmillan’s contacts with government agencies. He also lobbied Congress in matters regarding copyright legislation and other matters of concern to the publishing industry.

In 1980 a European conglomerate acquired Macmillan, Inc., in a hostile takeover and many high-level executives lost their positions. Drumm was ordered to close the Washington office. For a few months he continued his work for the company out of his home but in November 1980 was forced to retire.
