= William Henry Bullock =

American prelate

His Excellency, The Most Reverend William H. Bullock
- Bishop of Madison; Titular Bishop of Natchesium
- Church: Roman Catholic Church
- See: Madison
- In office: April 13, 1993 – May 23, 2003
- Predecessor: Cletus F. O'Donnell
- Successor: Robert C. Morlino
- Previous posts: Bishop of Des Moines (1987 to 1993); Auxiliary Bishop of Saint Paul and Minneapolis (1980 to 1987)

Orders
- Ordination: June 7, 1952 by John Gregory Murray
- Consecration: August 12, 1980 by John Robert Roach

Personal details
- Born: April 13, 1927 Maple Lake, Minnesota, US
- Died: April 3, 2011 (aged 83) Madison, Wisconsin, US
- Education: Saint Paul Seminary; University of Notre Dame
- Motto: Grace, mercy and peace

William Henry Bullock (April 13, 1927 – April 3, 2011) was an American prelate of the Roman Catholic Church who served as bishop of the Diocese of Madison in Wisconsin from 1993 to 2003.

Bullock previously served as an auxiliary bishop of the Archdiocese of Saint Paul and Minneapolis in Minnesota from 1980 to 1987 and as bishop of the Diocese of Des Moines in Iowa from 1987 to 1993.

== Biography ==
=== Early life ===
William Bullock was born on April 13, 1927, in Maple Lake, Minnesota. He attended Saint Paul Seminary in St. Paul, Minnesota, and the University of Notre Dame in Notre Dame, Indiana, where he received advanced degrees in religious education and liturgy.

=== Priesthood ===
Bullock was ordained a priest by at the Cathedral of St. Paul in St. Paul, Minnesota, by Archbishop John Murray on June 7, 1952, for the Archdiocese of Saint Paul. He taught religion for several years and served as headmaster at Saint Thomas Academy, an archdiocesan high school in Mendota Heights, Minnesota. He held a pastoral position at Saint John the Baptist Parish in Excelsior, Minnesota from 1971 to 1980.

=== Auxiliary Bishop of Saint Paul and Minneapolis ===
Bullock was appointed as an auxiliary bishop of Saint Paul and Minneapolis and titular bishop of Natchesium on June 3, 1980, by Pope John Paul II. He was consecrated at the Cathedral of St. Paul on August 12, 1980, by Archbishop John Roach.

=== Bishop of Des Moines ===
On February 10, 1987, Bullock was appointed bishop of Des Moines by John Paul II, succeeding Maurice John Dingman. He was installed on April 2, 1987. According to the diocese, Bullock established a policy addressing sexual abuse in 1988, created the St. Joseph Emergency Family Shelter and St. Mary Family Center, and helped establish the Catholic Pastoral Center in Des Moines.

=== Bishop of Madison ===
On April 13, 1993, John Paul II appointed Bullock as the third bishop of Madison; he was installed on June 14, 1993. In 1995, Bullock made the controversial decision to close Holy Name Seminary, a private boys high school in Madison, Wisconsin, after he concluded that not enough of the graduates became priests to justify the cost of the school. He created an office of Hispanic ministry, and he authorized the construction of a social services center to help new immigrants and the poor. In the final years of his tenure, he created an eight-member sexual abuse review board of mostly lay people to advise the diocese.

=== Retirement and death ===
In 2002, Bullock reached the church's mandatory retirement age of 75, and on May 23, 2003, John Paul II accepted Bullock's resignation as bishop of Madison. Bullock died on April 3, 2011, of lung cancer in Madison.

== See also ==
- Catholic Church hierarchy
- Catholic Church in the United States
- Historical list of the Catholic bishops of the United States
- List of Catholic bishops of the United States
- Lists of patriarchs, archbishops, and bishops

Catholic Church titles
Preceded by –	Bishop Emeritus of Madison; 2003–2011	Succeeded by –
Preceded by Cletus F. O'Donnell	Bishop of Madison; 1993–2003	Succeeded by Robert C. Morlino
Preceded by Maurice John Dingman	Bishop of Des Moines; 1987–1993	Succeeded by Joseph Leo Charron
Preceded by –	Auxiliary Bishop of Saint Paul and Minneapolis; 1980–1987	Succeeded by –
