= William Michael Joensen =

American prelate of the Catholic Church (born 1960)

His Excellency, The Most Reverend William Michael Joensen Ph.D.
- Bishop of Des Moines
- Archdiocese: Dubuque
- Diocese: Des Moines
- Appointed: July 18, 2019
- Installed: September 27, 2019
- Predecessor: Richard Pates

Orders
- Ordination: June 24, 1989 by Daniel Kucera
- Consecration: September 27, 2019 by Michael Owen Jackels, R. Walker Nickless, and Thomas Zinkula

Personal details
- Born: July 8, 1960 (age 66) Waterloo, Iowa, US
- Education: Iowa State University; University of Iowa; Pontifical College Josephinum; Catholic University of America
- Motto: Exquirite faciem suam (Seek His face)

Styles of William Michael Joensen
- Reference style: His Excellency; The Most Reverend
- Spoken style: Your Excellency
- Religious style: Bishop

William Michael Joensen (born July 8, 1960) is an American Catholic prelate who served as Bishop of Des Moines since 2019.

== Biography ==
=== Early life and education ===
William Joensen was born on July 8, 1960, in Waterloo, Iowa to Alfred W. Joensen and Marilyn E. (née Simington) Joensen. He is the eldest of five children and grew up in Ames, Iowa. Joensen received a Bachelor of Science degree in zoology from Iowa State University in Ames, Iowa. He was attending medical school at the University of Iowa in Iowa City, Iowa, when he decided instead to study for the priesthood. Joensen's seminary education was at the Pontifical College Josephinum in Columbus, Ohio.

=== Priesthood ===
On June 24, 1989, Joensen was ordained to the priesthood for the Archdiocese of Dubuque by Archbishop Daniel Kucera in the Church of the Nativity in Dubuque.

After his 1989 ordination, the archdiocese assigned him as associate pastor of Sacred Heart Parish and faculty member of Columbus High School, both in Waterloo, Iowa. He left these two posts in 1992 to become associate pastor of the Church of the Resurrection Parish in Dubuque. Joensen in 1995 went to Washington D.C. to attend the Catholic University of America, where he earned a Doctor of Philosophy degree in 2001.

When Joensen returned to Iowa, he served as a chaplain at Clarke College in Dubuque from 2003 to 2010. At Loras College in Dubuque, Joensen served as chaplain, associate professor of philosophy, and dean of campus spiritual life. At Dubuque's St. Pius X Seminary, Joensen was the spiritual director. Joensen also served as a faculty member at the Tertio Millennio Seminar on the Free Society in Kraków, Poland.

=== Bishop of Des Moines Diocese ===
Pope Francis appointed Joensen as the tenth bishop of Des Moines on July 18, 2019. His episcopal ordination took place on September 27, 2019, at St. Francis of Assisi Church in West Des Moines, Iowa. Archbishop Michael Jackels was the consecrator, with Bishop R. Walker Nickless and Bishop Thomas Zinkula as the co-consecrators.

In January 2023, Joensen published a decree that required students in Catholic schools to dress according to their gender at birth and use bathrooms and locker rooms accordingly.

== See also ==
- Catholic Church hierarchy
- Catholic Church in the United States
- Historical list of the Catholic bishops of the United States
- List of Catholic bishops of the United States
- Lists of patriarchs, archbishops, and bishops

Catholic Church titles
Preceded by Richard Pates	Bishop of Des Moines; 2019-Present	Succeeded by Incumbent
