= Thomas William Drumm =

Irish-born prelate

His Excellency, The Most Reverend Thomas William Drumm
- Bishop of Des Moines
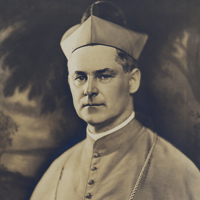
- Church: Roman Catholic Church
- See: Des Moines
- In office: March 28, 1919 – October 24, 1933
- Predecessor: Austin Dowling
- Successor: Gerald Thomas Bergan

Orders
- Ordination: December 21, 1901 by Paul Bruchési
- Consecration: May 21, 1919 by John Joseph Keane

Personal details
- Born: July 12, 1871 Fore, County Westmeath, Ireland
- Died: October 24, 1933 (aged 62) Des Moines, Iowa, US
- Education: St. Joseph's College; Grand Seminary of Montreal; Catholic University of America
- Motto: Stet et pascat (Stand and feed)

Thomas William Drumm (July 12, 1871 – October 24, 1933) was an Irish-born prelate of the Roman Catholic Church. He served as bishop of Des Moines in Iowa from 1919 until his death in 1933.

== Biography ==
=== Early life ===
Thomas Drumm was born on July 12, 1871, in Fore, County Westmeath in Ireland to Thomas and Mary (née Cullen) Drumm. He came to the United States in 1888, and began his studies at St. Joseph's College in Dubuque, Iowa. Drumm then entered the Grand Seminary of Montreal in Montreal, Quebec.

=== Priesthood ===
Drumm was ordained to the priesthood for the Archdiocese of Dubuque in Montreal by Archbishop Paul Bruchési on December 21, 1901. He then furthered his studies at the Catholic University of America in Washington, D.C. After his ordination, the archdiocese assigned Drumm to pastoral positions in several missions. He was named pastor of St. Patrick's Parish in Cedar Rapids, Iowa, in 1915.

=== Bishop of Des Moines ===
On March 28, 1919, Drumm was appointed the second bishop of Des Moines by Pope Benedict XV. He received his episcopal consecration at the Cathedral of Saint Raphael in Dubuque, Iowa, on May 21, 1919, from Archbishop John Joseph Keane, with Bishops James J. Davis and Edmond Heelan serving as co-consecrators. In 1924 he became the first Catholic bishop to preach regularly on the radio, offering monthly broadcasts on WHO-AM in Des Moines.

Drumm died in Des Moines on October 24, 1933 at age 62.
