= St. Patrick's Roman Catholic Church (Madison, Wisconsin) =

Historic church in Wisconsin, United States

- U.S. National Register of Historic Places
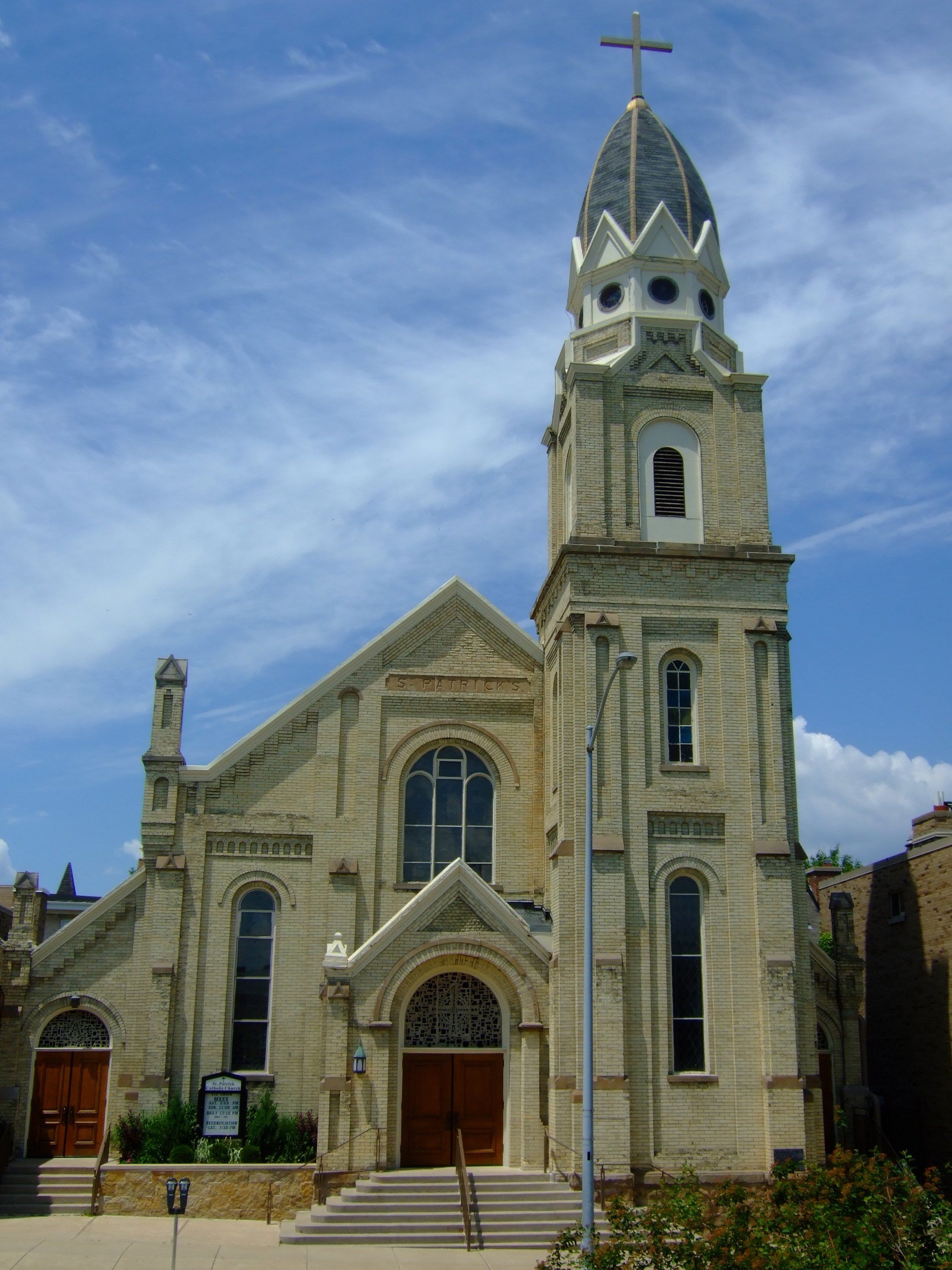
- St. Patrick's Roman Catholic Church
- Location: 404 E. Main St. Madison, Wisconsin
- Coordinates: 43.07698°N 89.3791°W
- Architect: John Nader
- Architectural style: Romanesque Revival
- NRHP reference No.: 82000657
- Added to NRHP: September 16, 1982

St. Patrick's Roman Catholic Church is a historic Catholic church near Capitol Square in downtown Madison, Wisconsin. It was designed by one of Madison's pioneer architects and built in 1888 to serve the former parish of St. Patrick.

In 1972, the church was designated a landmark by the Madison Landmarks Commission. It was added to the National Register of Historic Places in 1982 for its architectural significance.

== Architecture ==
St. Patrick's is a rectangular Romanesque Revival church marked by a 100-ft tower on the right side of the front facade. Fr. Knox, the first pastor, commissioned the design from local architect John Nader; Nader had also designed St. Mary's (later Holy Mother of Consolation) church in Oregon, Wisconsin, where Knox had previously served.

The tower is topped with a narrow shingled dome, resting on eight small triangular pediments that link it to the octagonal wood-frame structure below it, each side of which is lit with an oculus. The foundation is built of local sandstone, whereas the superstructure is built of cream-colored brick with stone trim and decorative brickwork. Each bay, separated by plain pilasters with stone caps, features a round-arched window.

The interior of the church has a plaster ceiling in a shallow, curved vault. The window bays are demarcated by half-vaults from the wall and ribs on the ceiling, connected with small pendentives. The current interior was installed during the 1957 renovation, including the predella and altar, communion rail, and parts of the side altars, done in three types of marble.

== History ==
The parish was established to serve the largely Irish community living east of Capitol Square. St. Raphael's purchased two lots on east Main Street in 1886, and on May 24, 1888, the new parish of St. Patrick was formally established and took ownership of the land. Irish-born Fr. Patrick Knox was made pastor, and he set about the task of organizing the congregation and raising funds to build the new church, which was dedicated on Saint Patrick's Day of 1889. Archbishop Michael Heiss of the Archdiocese of Milwaukee was in attendance.

By 1902 the parish needed more space for mass and expanded the nave ten feet on each side. In 1907, a Catholic school was opened, staffed by the Sinsinawa Dominican Sisters.

Although the church was renovated in 1957 and expanded its facilities in 1958, suburbanization, enrollment growth at the University of Wisconsin, and the growth of the state government were already depopulating the isthmus neighborhoods. The decline in parish and school rolls hastened with the opening of St. Peter's parish in 1967. In 1977, the school was closed and sold to the Salvation Army, and the former convent converted into a religious education center, then a service center for Catholic Charities USA.

By the 2000s, the priest shortage was making it difficult for the Diocese of Madison to keep its churches staffed. After the old Saint Raphael's Cathedral was destroyed by arson in 2005, St. Patrick's, Holy Redeemer, and St. Raphael's were merged to form the new Cathedral Parish of St. Raphael. The merger of the three downtown parishes was announced in October 2007 and executed on July 1, 2008, part of the ongoing major realignment of parishes in the diocese.
