= Sherman Avenue =

Sherman Avenue may refer to:

- Sherman Avenue (Hamilton, Ontario), Canada
- Sherman Avenue Historic District (Madison, Wisconsin), US
