= Paul Swain =

Paul Swain may refer to:

- Paul Swain (politician) (born 1951), New Zealand politician
- Paul J. Swain (1943–2022), American Roman Catholic bishop
