= Paul J. Swain =

American Roman Catholic bishop (1943–2022)

His Excellency, The Most Reverend Paul Joseph Swain
- Bishop of Sioux Falls
- Church: Catholic Church
- Diocese: Sioux Falls
- Appointed: August 31, 2006
- Installed: October 26, 2006
- Term ended: December 12, 2019
- Predecessor: Robert Carlson
- Successor: Donald DeGrood

Orders
- Ordination: May 27, 1988 by Cletus F. O'Donnell
- Consecration: October 26, 2006 by Harry Joseph Flynn, Robert James Carlson, and William Henry Bullock

Personal details
- Born: September 12, 1943 Newark, New York, U.S.
- Died: November 26, 2022 (aged 79) Sioux Falls, South Dakota, U.S.
- Education: Ohio Northern University; University of Wisconsin–Madison; University of Wisconsin Law School; Blessed John XXIII National Seminary
- Motto: Confitemini Domino (Give praise to the Lord)

Styles of Paul Joseph Swain
- Reference style: His Excellency; The Most Reverend
- Spoken style: Your Excellency
- Religious style: Bishop

Paul Joseph Swain (September 12, 1943 – November 26, 2022) was an American bishop of the Catholic Church. He served as the eighth bishop of the Diocese of Sioux Falls in South Dakota from 2006 to 2019.

== Biography ==
=== Early life ===
Paul Joseph Swain was born on September 12, 1943, in Newark, New York, to William and Gertrude (née Mohr) Swain. He attended public schools in Newark and graduated from high school there in 1961. Swain then entered Ohio Northern University, earning a Bachelor of Arts degree in history in 1965. In 1967, Swain was awarded a Master of Arts degree in political science from the University of Wisconsin–Madison.

Following graduate school, Swain joined the United States Air Force as an intelligence officer. He served in the Vietnam War and received a Bronze Star. Swain was discharged from the Air Force in 1972. In 1974, Swain received a Juris Doctor from University of Wisconsin Law School. After working in private practice for a few years, he served as legal counsel and director of policy for Wisconsin Governor Lee Dreyfus from 1979 to 1983. After Dreyfus left office, Swain returned to private practice.

During his time with Dreyfus, Swain, a Methodist, became interested in the Catholic Church. He began reading about Catholicism and attending mass. Swain was formally received into the Catholic Church in 1983 at Holy Redeemer Parish in Madison. Swain then attended Blessed John XXIII National Seminary in Weston, Massachusetts, earning a Master of Divinity degree in 1988.

=== Priesthood ===
On May 27, 1988, Swain was ordained a priest for the Diocese of Madison at the Cathedral of St. Raphael in Madison by Bishop Cletus O'Donnell. His first assignment was as associate pastor of Sacred Hearts of Jesus and Mary Parish in Sun Prairie, Wisconsin. He later served as pastor of St. Mary of Pine Bluff Parish in Cross Plains, Wisconsin, and St. Bernard Parish in Middleton, Wisconsin.

Swain also served as assistant to the bishop, vice chancellor, moderator of the curia, and vocations director. Pope John Paul II named Swain a prelate of honor, allowing him the title of "Monsignor". At the end of his tenure in the diocese, Swain was named rector of the Cathedral of St. Raphael and vicar general.

On March 14, 2005, while Swain was serving at the cathedral in Madison, it was torched by William Connell, a resident of Lodi, Wisconsin. Due to its damage, the diocese was forced to demolish it. In 2006, Swain met with Connell in jail to offer him forgiveness. Connell expressed great regret for his actions. Swain said at the time of the fire:

As soon as I learned it was arson, I just couldn't believe somebody would do that, unless the person were troubled, and so I never really had any bitterness. I honestly believe from other aspects of my life that God uses these moments that seem tragic to deepen our faith and to call us to be more profoundly who we are.

=== Bishop of Sioux Falls ===
On August 31, 2006, Pope Benedict XVI appointed Swain as the eighth bishop of Sioux Falls, replacing Bishop Robert Carlson. Swain was consecrated on October 26, 2006, at the Cathedral of St. Joseph in Sioux Falls by Archbishop Harry Flynn, with Bishops Robert Carlson and William Bullock as co-consecrators. Swain's episcopal motto is "Give Praise to the Lord".

A member of the Knights of Columbus and the Equestrian Order of the Holy Sepulchre of Jerusalem, Swain served on the board of directors for both Blessed John XXIII National Seminary and Saint Paul Seminary. On March 25, 2019, Swain released a list of 11 priests from the diocese with "substantiated allegations" of child sexual abuse from the 1940's into the 1990's. Swain made this statement:

Victims of sexual abuse too often suffer in silence. Many have shared that they remain silent for fear they will not be believed. By identifying those clergy in our diocese who have had substantiated allegations made against them and providing an accounting of how these were handled over the years.

=== Retirement and death ===
On December 12, 2019, Pope Francis accepted Swain's resignation as bishop of Sioux Falls. Swain died in hospice care in Sioux Falls, on November 26, 2022, at age 79.

== See also ==
- Catholic Church hierarchy
- Catholic Church in the United States
- Historical list of the Catholic bishops of the United States
- List of Catholic bishops of the United States
- Lists of patriarchs, archbishops, and bishops

Catholic Church titles
Preceded by Robert Carlson	Bishop of Sioux Falls; 2006–2019	Succeeded by Donald DeGrood
