= St. Bernard Catholic Church (Madison, Wisconsin) =

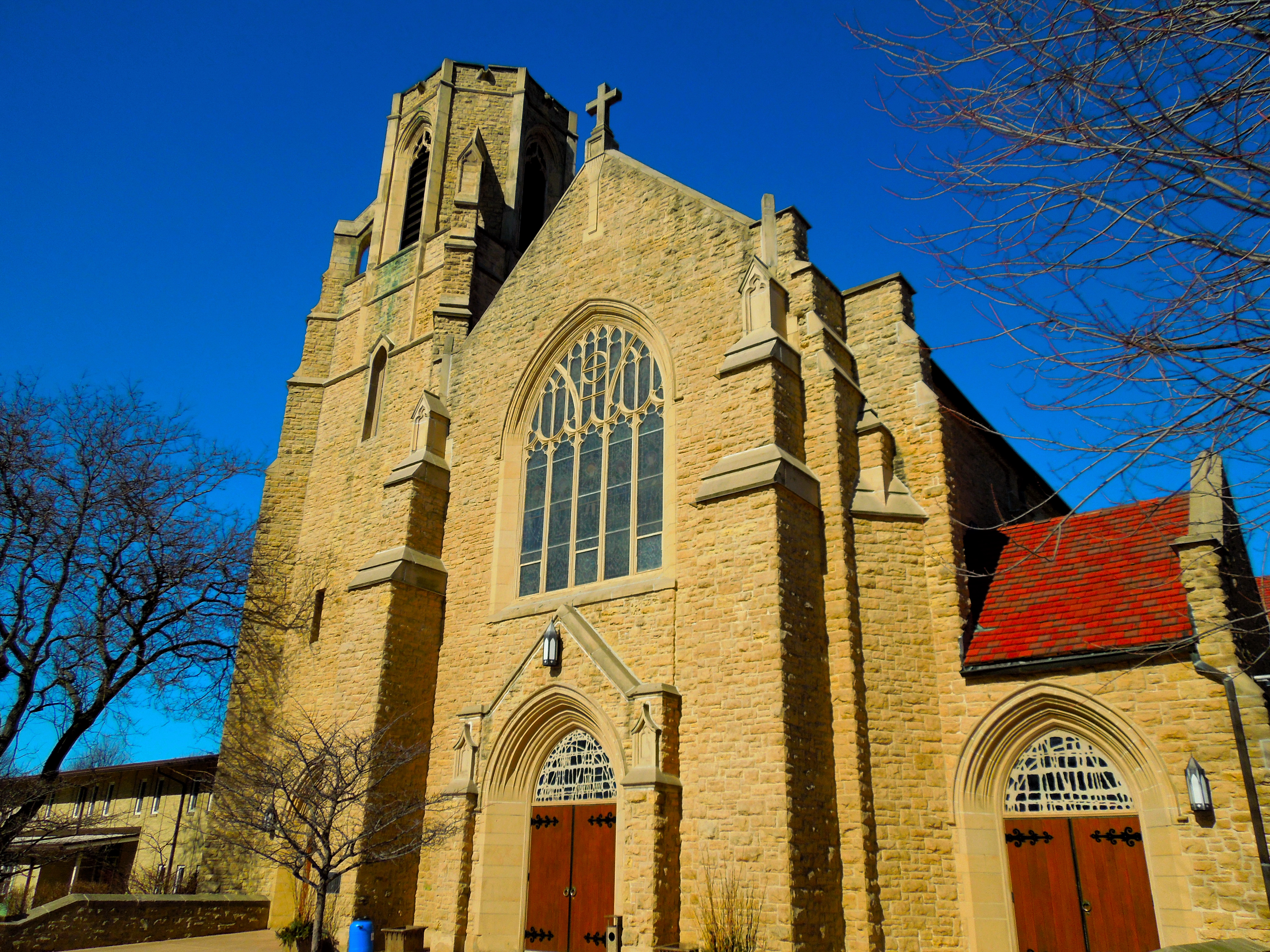
- St. Bernard Church in 2012
- St. Bernard Catholic Church
- 43°05′40″N 89°20′42″W
- Location: 2438 Atwood Avenue; Madison, Wisconsin
- Country: United States
- Denomination: Catholic Church
- Website: www.sbmsn.org

History
- Status: Parish church
- Founded: 1907
- Founder: Rev. John Fisher
- Dedication: St. Bernard of Clairvaux

Architecture
- Functional status: Active
- Architect: John Flad
- Style: Gothic Revival
- Years built: 1926–1927
- Construction cost: $175,000

Specifications
- Materials: Sandstone

Administration
- Diocese: Madison

Clergy
- Bishop: Most Rev. Donald J. Hying
- Pastor: Rev. Michael Radowicz

St. Bernard Catholic Church, in Madison, Wisconsin, United States, is a parish church in the Diocese of Madison. The parish was founded in 1907 and the church building was completed in 1927. In 2023, Bishop Donald J. Hying petitioned the Vatican to designate the church building as the diocesan cathedral. Pope Francis erected St. Bernard's as the new cathedral the same year. The consecration of the church as a cathedral was expected to take place in 2026.

== History ==
=== St. Bernard Churches ===
During the first half of the 20th century, Catholics in the Madison area were under the jurisdiction of the Archdiocese of Milwaukee. In October 1907, Archbishop Sebastian Messmer assigned the priest John Fisher to Madison to establish a parish on the city's east side. He celebrated the first mass there in a neighborhood home in November 1907. Once the Fair Oaks Town Hall was completed in early 1908, Fisher moved the masses. The parish constructed the first St. Bernard's Church, a combination church and school building, in 1910, along with a rectory. At this point, the parish had 80 families enrolled as members. The Racine Dominican Sisters were brought in to teach at the school.

By the early 1920s, the parish had outgrown its current church. William Eggers, the pastor of St. Bernard's, hired the Madison architect John Flad to design a new Gothic Revival church. The second St. Bernard's Church opened in 1926. It became the largest Catholic church in Madison.

Pope Pius XII in 1946 erected the Diocese of Madison and designated St. Raphael's Church as St. Raphael's Cathedral. In 1930 the split off the new Immaculate Heart of Mary Parish from St. Bernard's Parish. During that decade, St. Bernard's built a new school building to accommodate the rising number of students.

In the 1960s, St. Bernard Parish constructed a new convent and rectory. The church was also remodeled to reflect liturgical mandates from the Second Vatican Council of the early 1960s. Due to a drop in student enrollment, the parish closed its school in 1970. In 1993, the parish moved its offices to the former school building. The parish also made the church more accessible and converted the school building into a parish center.

On March 14, 2005, St. Raphael's Cathedral was destroyed by an arsonist, leaving the diocese without a cathedral. The diocese used parish churches for diocesan celebrations. During the 2010s, St. Bernard upgraded its computer and phone systems, repaired the bells in the bell tower and made minor changes to the sanctuary.

In December 2022, Bishop Donald Hying outlined three proposals to settle the cathedral question. This was part of the Into the Deep strategic planning process for the diocese. The choices were:

- Build a new cathedral on the St. Raphael site
- Continue using parish facilities for diocesan events
- Elevate an existing parish church to a cathedral.

Hying decided that the diocese could not afford a new cathedral and could not continue using parish facilities indefinitely. In January 2023, he proposed that the diocese petition the Vatican to name St. Bernard's Church as the diocesan cathedral. This plan would require a smaller financial burden for the diocese and it could be accomplished with a small capital campaign to raise the necessary funds. A petition to name St. Bernard's as the cathedral was submitted to the Vatican for its approval.

The diocese then began a $15 million project to renovate St. Bernard's and make the necessary changes for it to function as a Cathedral. . In August 2023, the church was closed for renovation, with services moved to the former school gymnasium.

=== St. Bernard's Cathedral ===
In September 2023, Pope Francis erected St. Bernard's as the new cathedral for the Diocese of Madison. The Dicastery for Bishops was to issue an official decree of erection at a future date. Hying held a press conference at St. Bernard's in January 2024, to announce the decision. St. Bernard's would be consecrated as a cathedral in 2026 after the renovation project was completed.

== Pastors ==
The following priests have served St. Bernard's as its pastor:

- John Fisher, 1907–1908
- John Bach, 1908–1916
- George Loughney, 1916–1925
- William Eggers, 1925–1960
- Theodore Thome, 1960–1974
- George Wirz, 1974–1984
- John Hebl, 1984–1993
- Michael Hippee, 1993–2013
- Michael Radowicz, 2013–2026
- Michael Wanta, 2026–present

== Gallery ==
Interior of the church before the 2023 renovations

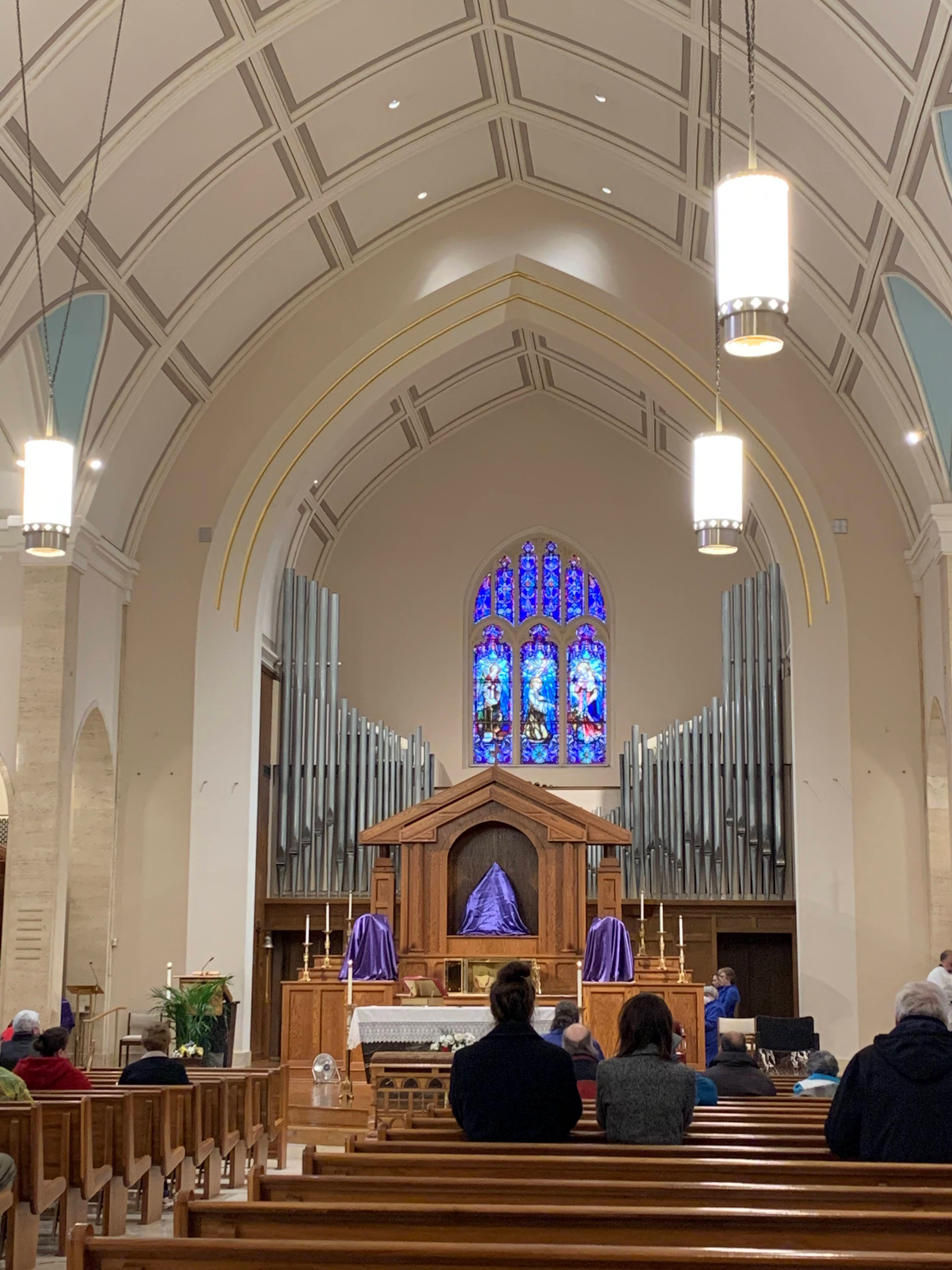
Holy Week 2022

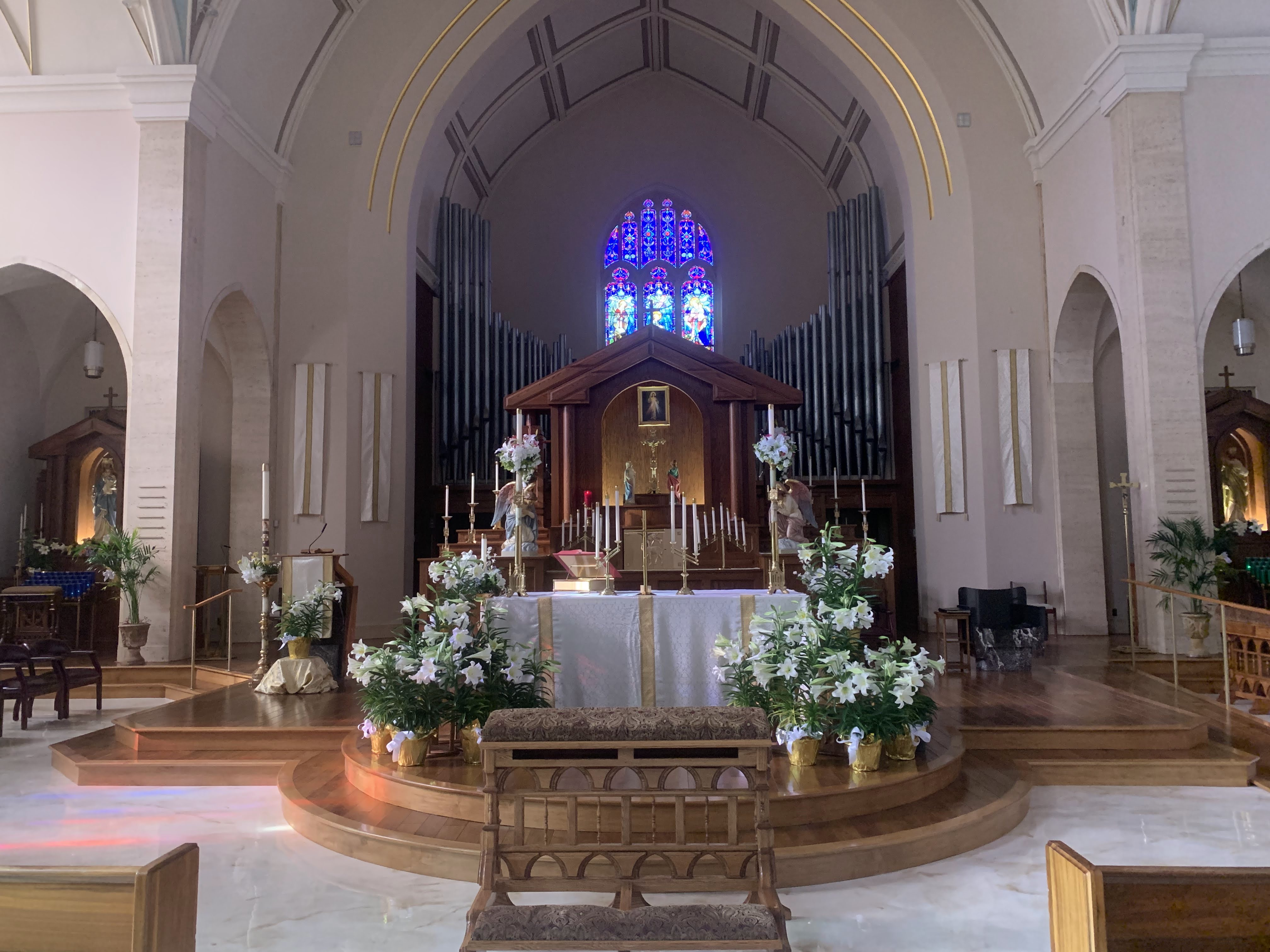
Altar

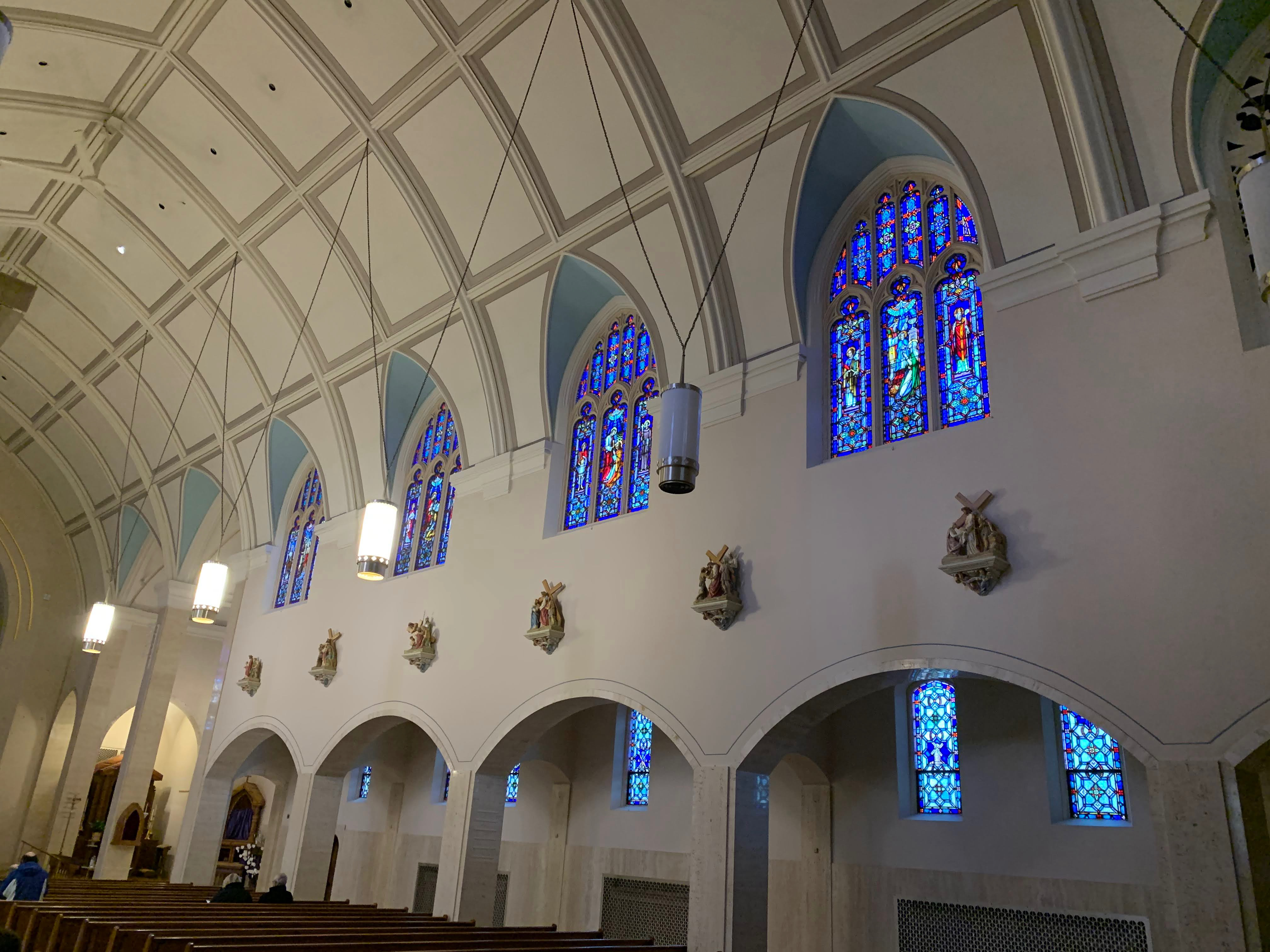
Right-hand windows

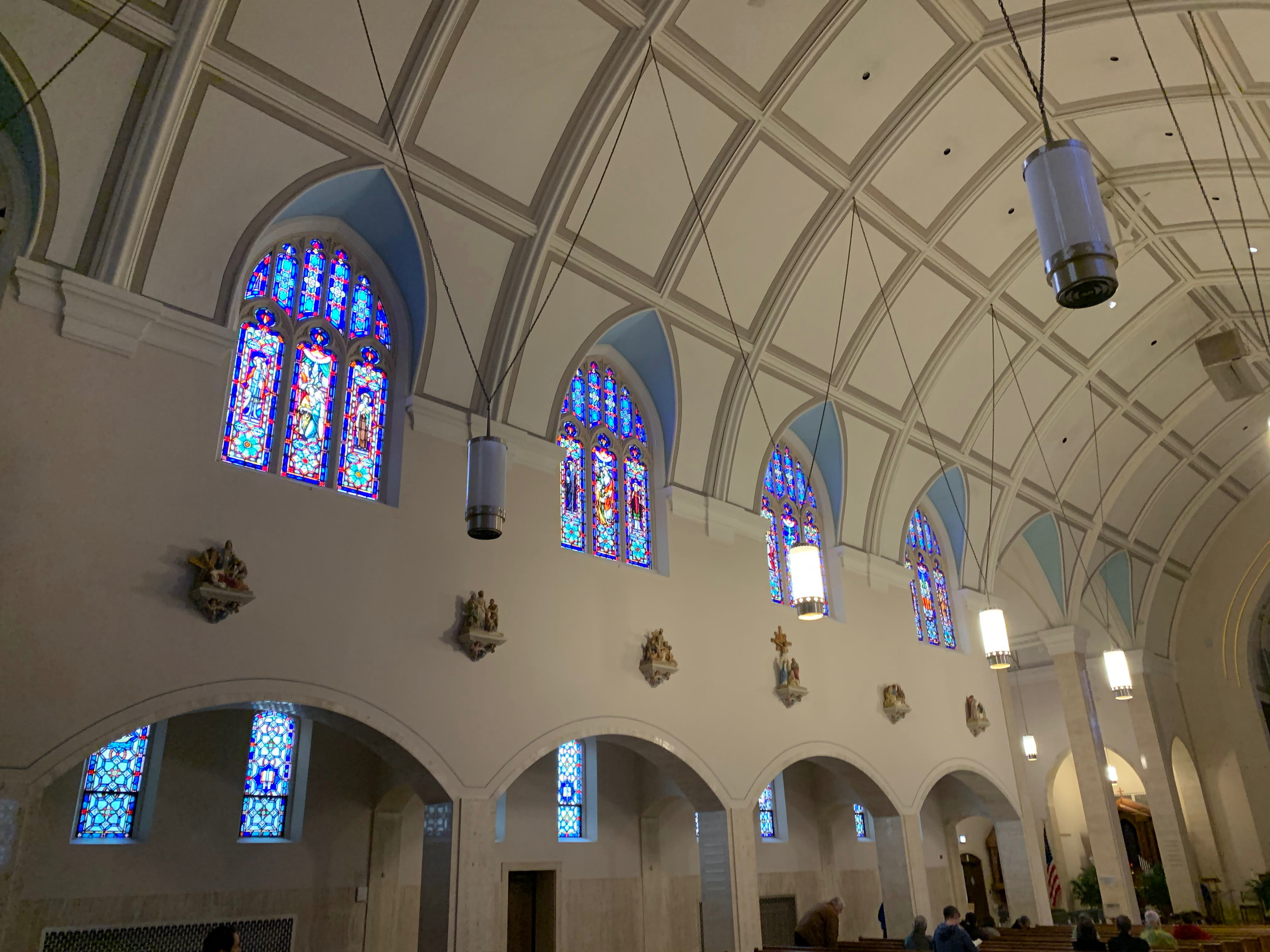
Left-hand windows
