= Louis Hirsig House =

Historic house in Wisconsin, United States

- U.S. National Register of Historic Places
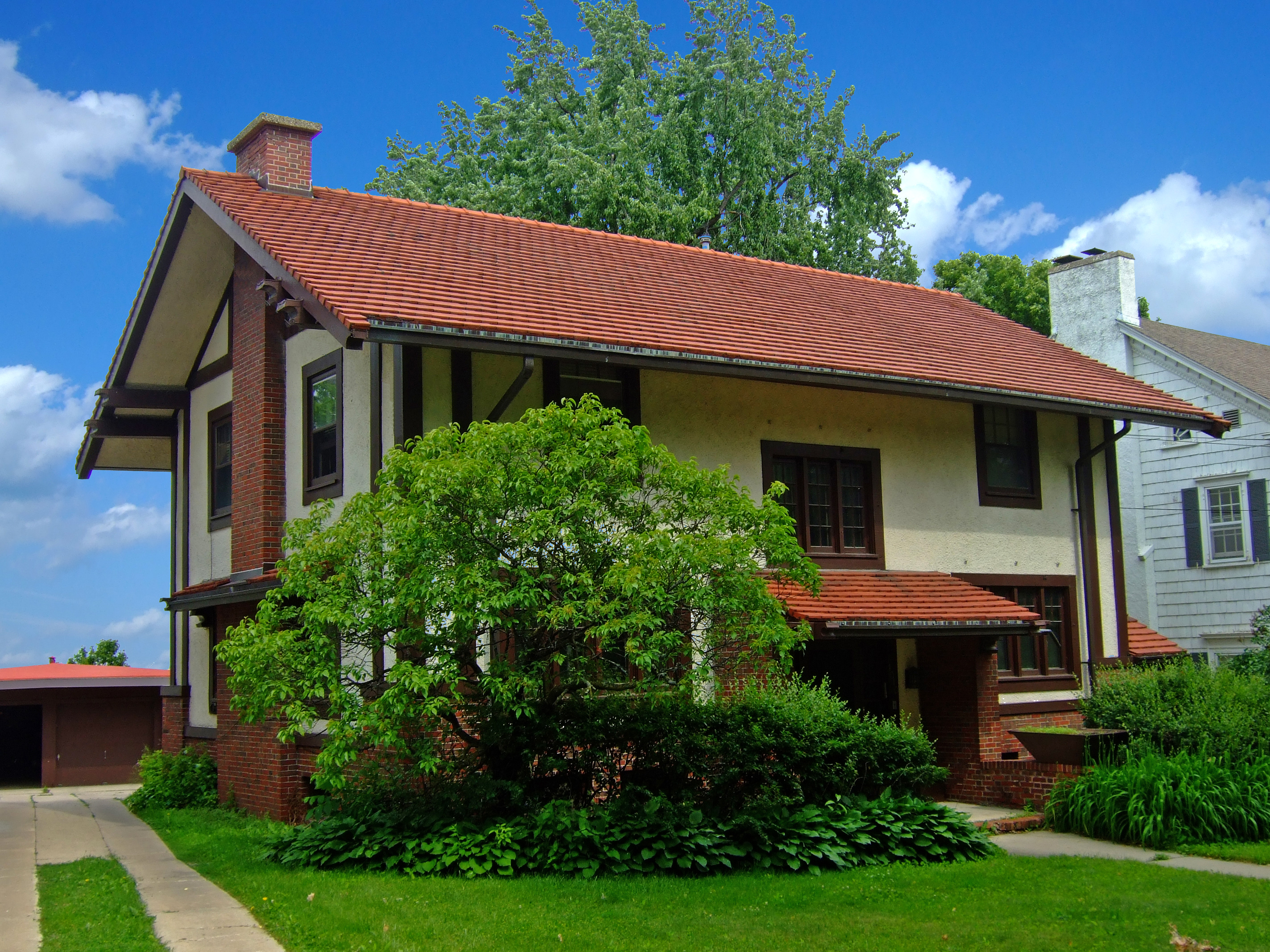

- Location within Wisconsin Location within the United States
- Location: 1010 Sherman Ave. Madison, Wisconsin
- Coordinates: 43°5′14″N 89°22′33″W
- Area: less than one acre
- Built: c. 1913
- Architect: Alvan Edmund Small
- Architectural style: Prairie School
- NRHP reference No.: 74000072
- Added to NRHP: December 2, 1974

The Louis Hirsig House is a small Prairie Style house designed by Alvan Small and built in 1913 in Madison, Wisconsin, United States. In 1974 it was added to the National Register of Historic Places.

== History ==
Louis Hirsig was born in 1876 forty-five miles south of Madison in Monroe. Starting at age 14 as an apprentice tinsmith in Monroe, he worked his way into the retail business in Madison.

About 1913 Hirsig commissioned Madison architect Alvin Small to design a home. Small designed the house in the compact-cubicle form of Prairie Style, with a brick foundation, with stucco walls, with broad eaves that emphasize the horizontal, and with a side-gabled roof covered with flat red tile. The bands of windows are typical Prairie style. The trim-boards give a hint of half-timbering. A shed roof porch shelters the front door and echoes the main roof above.

Alvin Small was born nearby in Sun Prairie, and began work for the architects Allen Conover and Lew Porter, then a year for Louis Sullivan in Chicago, then back to Madison for several partnerships. Small also designed the stylistically very different Grimm Book Bindery.

By 1934 Louis was partnered in a hardware store called Wolff-Kubly & Hirsig Co. on the capitol square, at 17 South Pinckney. A charter member of Madison Rotary, Louis was involved in many civic organizations, including Red Cross, and the Chamber of Commerce. He died in 1959.

In 1974 the Hirsig house was added to the NRHP as a locally significant, good example of compact-cubical Prairie Style. The following year it was designated a landmark by the Madison Landmarks Commission. It is located within the Sherman Avenue Historic District.
