= William Patrick O'Connor =

American prelate

His Excellency, The Most Reverend William Patrick O'Connor
- Bishop of Madison
- See: Diocese of Madison
- Appointed: February 22, 1946
- Installed: March 12, 1946
- Term ended: February 18, 1967
- Successor: Cletus F. O'Donnell
- Previous posts: Bishop of Superior (1942–1946)

Orders
- Ordination: March 10, 1912 by Joseph Maria Koudelka
- Consecration: March 7, 1942 by Moses E. Kiley, Aloisius Joseph Muench, and Vincent James Ryan

Personal details
- Born: October 18, 1886 Milwaukee, Wisconsin, US
- Died: July 13, 1973 (aged 86) Madison, Wisconsin, US
- Denomination: Roman Catholic
- Education: St. Francis Seminary; Marquette University; Catholic University of America
- Motto: In nomine Jesu (In the name of Jesus)

William Patrick O'Connor (October 18, 1886 – July 13, 1973) was an American prelate of the Catholic Church. He served as the fifth bishop of the Diocese of Superior in Wisconsin (1942–1946) and the first bishop of the new Diocese of Madison in Wisconsin (1946–1967).

== Biography ==
=== Early life ===
William O'Connor was born on October 18, 1886, in Milwaukee, Wisconsin, one of five children of Patrick and Ellen (née McCarthy) O'Connor. He received his early education at St. John Cathedral grade school in Milwaukee, and then entered St. Francis Seminary in St. Francis, Wisconsin in 1901.

=== Priesthood ===
O'Connor was ordained to the priesthood for the Archdiocese of Milwaukee on March 10, 1912, by Bishop Joseph Koudelka. After his ordination, the archdiocese assigned O'Connor as assistant pastor of St. Rose of Lima Parish in Milwaukee, where he remained for four years. During this time, he also studied at Marquette University in Milwaukee and earned a Bachelor of Arts degree in philosophy in 1916. O'Connor then entered the Catholic University of America in Washington, D.C., but his studies were interrupted by the American entry into World War I in 1917.

In 1917, O'Connor was commissioned as a first lieutenant in the Wisconsin National Guard; he then served as a chaplain with the US Army 32nd Infantry Division in France He was awarded the French Croix de Guerre medal for bravery in action.

After the end of the war in 1919, O'Connor resumed his studies at Catholic University and earned his Doctor of Philosophy degree in 1921. He returned to Milwaukee, where he taught philosophy at St. Francis Seminary for 20 years. He was named president of the American Catholic Philosophical Association in 1939, and became pastor of St. Thomas Aquinas Parish in Milwaukee in 1941.

=== Bishop of Superior ===
On December 27, 1941, O'Connor was appointed the fifth bishop of Superior by Pope Pius XII. He received his episcopal consecration on March 7, 1942, from Archbishop Moses E. Kiley, with Bishops Aloisius Muench and Vincent Ryan serving as co-consecrators.

During his tenure as bishop, O'Connor founded three new parishes, opened two new schools, and erected ten units of the Confraternity of Christian Doctrine with a total enrollment of 12,000 children. He also oversaw the diocese's relief efforts during World War II, including the sponsoring of local blood drives.

=== Bishop of Madison ===
O'Connor was appointed by Pius XII as the first bishop of the newly created Diocese of Madison on February 22, 1946. O'Connor was installed at Saint Raphael's Cathedral in Madison, Wisconsin, on March 12, 1946.

During his tenure, the diocese went from having 135 priests serving 82,000 Catholics to having 290 priests serving a Catholic population of 180,640. In his first year as bishop, O'Connor established the Blessed Martin Guild to promote racial understanding and convert more minorities to Catholicism. He also founded Holy Name Seminary in Madison in 1965, and participated in the Second Vatican Council in Rome(1962–1965). As part of the council's reforms, he established a diocesan priest senate in 1966.

=== Retirement and legacy ===
On February 18, 1967, Pope Paul VI accepted O'Connor's resignation as bishop of Madison after 21 years of service. William O'Connor died of a heart attack in Madison on July 13, 1973, at age 86.

== See also ==
- Catholic Church hierarchy
- Catholic Church in the United States
- Historical list of the Catholic bishops of the United States
- List of Catholic bishops of the United States
- Lists of patriarchs, archbishops, and bishops

Catholic Church titles
Preceded by None	Bishop of Madison; 1946–1967	Succeeded by Cletus F. O'Donnell
Preceded by Theodore H. Reverman	Bishop of Superior; 1942–1946	Succeeded by Albert Gregory Meyer
