= Flad Architects =

American architectural firm

- Type: Corporation
- Industry: Science & Technology, Academic, Healthcare, Corporate
- Founded: 1927
- Founder: John J. Flad
- Headquarters: Madison, Wisconsin, United States
- Number of locations: Madison, Wisconsin; Atlanta, Georgia; Boston, Massachusetts; Gainesville, Florida; Tampa, Florida; Raleigh, North Carolina; San Diego, California; San Francisco, California; Seattle, Washington; and New York, New York;
- Services: Architecture, Interior Design, Landscape Architecture, Structural Engineering, Strategic Planning, Master Planning, Sustainable Design
- Website: Flad Architects.

Flad Architects is a national architectural firm with offices in Atlanta, Boston, Gainesville, Madison, New York City, Raleigh, San Diego, San Francisco, Seattle, and Tampa. In addition to architectural design, Flad offers interior design, landscape architecture, master planning, strategic planning, structural engineering, and sustainable design services. The firm is involved in multiple markets and building types including: corporate, healthcare, higher education, science and technology, and the federal government, including many Department of Energy National Laboratories.

Flad is ranked No. 2 in the nation for science and technology (S+T) laboratory facility architecture and architecture/engineering (AE) firms, as reported in Building Design+Construction's 2025 Giants 400 Report. Flad is among Building Design + Construction’s Top 20 Architectural and Engineering firms and is ranked number 198 on the Engineering News-Record’s list of the “Top 500 Design Firms, and number 45 on the “Top 100 Green Firms.”

== History ==
John J. Flad was born and educated in Madison. He apprenticed with Madison architects, James O. Gordon, in 1907 and briefly with Robert Wright before working at Chicago firms from 1909 to 1914. He returned to Madison to work under Alvan E. Small until 1917; worked two years as Wisconsin State Architect; then rejoined Small until 1926. Flad designed the St. Bernard Catholic Church at 2460 Atwood in Madison. He also apprenticed with Frank Lloyd Wright.

=== Flad & Moulton ===
From 1926 until 1932, Flad partnered with Frank S. Moulton (1891-1981) to form Flad & Moulton. The firm produced several surviving buildings including South School (Reedsburg, Wisconsin) at 420 Plum Street (a Works Progress Administration funded project), the 1931 remodel of the Dowling Apartment Building (originally constructed in 1922) in Dane County, Wisconsin; the U.S. Post Office and Federal Courthouse (Madison, Wisconsin) and the Madison Catholic Association Clubhouse. Moulton designed the Reedsburg Municipal Hospital built in 1932, and his later work included the University of Wisconsin Memorial Union, University Hospital, and Student Nurses' Dormitory all on the University of Wisconsin campus.

National Register of Historic Places listed buildings by the firm (with attribution) include:

- Dowling Apartment Building, 445-447 W. Wilson St., Madison, WI (Flad and Moulton)
- Grimm Book Bindery, 454 W. Gilman St., Madison, WI (J Flad & Asso.)
- One or more works in Shorewood Historic District, roughly bounded by Lake Mendota Dr., Tallyho Ln., Shorewood Blvd., and the Blackhawk Country Club, Shorewood Hills, WI, (John J. Flad)
- One or more works in Waterloo Downtown Historic District, jct. of Madison and Monroe Sts., Waterloo, WI (John J. Flad & Son)

=== Flad & Associates ===
Flad & Associates first designs were churches and residential homes throughout the Madison, Wisconsin area, and St. Bernard Catholic Church was the first church designed by the firm. Another prominent building Flad designed was the Erickson Home for the Madison Small Homes Bureau, which was recognized by Architectural Forum magazine in 1936. Flad designed the Madison Catholic Association Clubhouse constructed in 1938 at 15 East Wilson Street, later known as the Diocese of Madison Chancery Building.

In the 1950s and 1960s Flad grew from a local practice to a regional practice and began specializing in higher education and healthcare projects throughout the Midwest. That specialization continues today on a more national scale. Early projects included Beloit Memorial Hospital in Beloit, Wisconsin, and the University of Wisconsin-Madison, Edward Burr Van Vleck Mathematics Building. Flad also designed the Parker Pen Company World's Fair Pavilion for the 1964 New York World's Fair.

In the late 1970s and early 1980s, the firm made a conscious decision to expand their experience designing hospital labs into a more global science and technology lab specialization designing corporate offices, data centers, training centers, and science and technology laboratories.

In 1985 Joe Flad, son of John Flad, sold the practice to five of his employees, transforming Flad & Associates into an employee-owned firm. In 2008 the firm changed its name from Flad & Associates to Flad Architects.

== Services and Market Sectors ==
According to its website, Flad specializes in the planning and design of innovative facilities for knowledge-based organizations in health, academic, and science. Its services include architectural design, interior design, planning and consulting, sustainable design, structural engineering, adaptive reuse and renovation, and landscape architecture. Working primarily with science-based organizations, Flad’s experience with specialized building types includes laboratory planning, pharma and biomanufacturing, agricultural research facilities, hospitals and clinics, medical education, and veterinary medicine. Flad’s planning and consulting services include space utilization studies, strategic master planning, and post-occupancy evaluations.

== Sustainable Design ==
Flad became a founding member of the U.S. Green Building Council (USGBC) in 1994 and played a role in the development of the original Leadership in Energy and Environmental Design (LEED) version 1.0 Building Rating System in 1996–1998. In 1998, the firm participated in the LEED Pilot Program to beta test the new rating systems with its Pharmacia Life Sciences Building project. Pharmacia's building became the first research facility to achieve LEED certification and was awarded a LEED Gold rating in 2001. Flad designed the UF Health Heart and Vascular Neuromedicine Hospitals, which in 2013 became the first hospitals in the United States to achieve 4 Green Globes certification.

In 2016, Flad signed the AIA 2030 commitment, which aims for a carbon-neutral portfolio by 2030. The firm has also joined the SE 2050 Commitment, which sets a goal of net zero embodied carbon structural systems by 2050, as well as the AIA Materials Pledge to select materials that support a circular economy and promote human health, ecosystem health, and climate health.

In 2004, Flad expanded its science and technology design services to include advanced energy research to develop clean energy sources, enhanced technologies and improved fuel efficiency. Two of the firm's energy research lab designs are Stony Brook University, Advanced Energy Research & Technology Center (AERTC) and the National Renewable Energy Laboratory (NREL), Integrated Biorefinery Research Facility.
