= Dowling Apartment Building =

- U.S. National Register of Historic Places
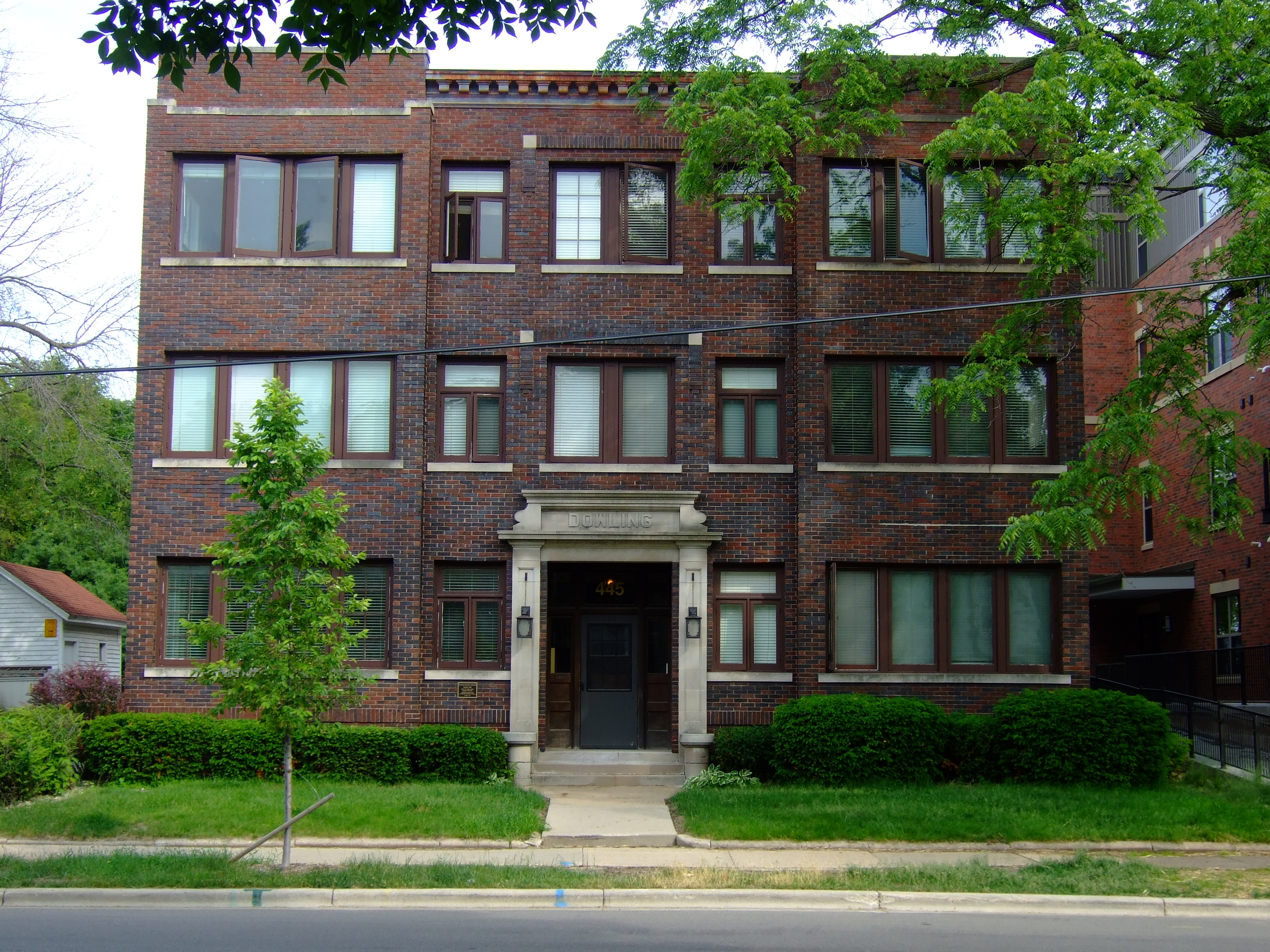
- Dowling Apartment Building
- Location: 445-447 W. Wilson St., Madison, Wisconsin
- Coordinates: 43°04′05″N 89°23′14″W
- Area: less than one acre
- Built: 1922/1931
- Architect: Philip Dean/Flad & Moulton
- NRHP reference No.: 02001127
- Added to NRHP: October 7, 2002

The Dowling Apartment Building was built as a luxury apartment block a half mile south of the capitol in Madison, Wisconsin in 1922. In 2002 it was added to the State and National Register of Historic Places.

== History ==
William L. Dowling was born in Madison in 1864 and raised in the neighborhood where he later built this apartment. As a young man, he worked in the freight department of the Chicago, Milwaukee, St. Paul and Pacific Railroad, then moved to mail clerk, then partnered in a shoe store on Capitol Square. By WWI, William was a community leader, chairing the local draft board and serving on the Madison Common Council for seven years in the 1910s and 1920s.

In middle age William married Margaret Graham. She had moved from Ohio to Madison in 1900, starting as a hat trimmer in the Mahoney Hat Shop, then buying the shop in 1904. She ran her M. L. Graham Hat Shop until 1917 when she married William, then sold the shop to her sisters.

The Dowlings had their apartment block built in 1922, ten years after the first such building appeared in Madison. The apartment block form of housing appeared in New York and Chicago in the last quarter of the 19th century, a way to expand the amount of housing in a neighborhood where land was limited, and to free residents from maintaining a yard and exterior of their home. In Madison the first apartment blocks were built in 1911. At the time, Madison's population was doubling about every twenty years, due to expansion of manufacturing, state government, and the university.

The Dowling Block was designed by Philip Dean of Madison, three stories tall, with a footprint like a squashed letter H, clad in dark brick and trimmed with light stone. Neoclassical styling is present in the molding and modillion in the front cornice and the pilasters and entablature around the front entrance. The name "DOWLING" is inscribed above that entrance and a lantern hangs on either side. That entrance door has sidelights and a transom. A hip-roofed stair tower is attached to the back of the building, clad in stucco. The initial construction cost was $30,000.

Inside were ten apartments, with a central hall on each floor. The Dowlings themselves lived in the three-bedroom apartment A - one whole side of the first floor. The apartments were finished with mahogany doors, birds' eye maple floors, plaster walls and ceilings, hex tiles in the kitchens and bathrooms, Craftsman-style woodwork, built-in cupboards, dining room chandeliers, and a fireplace in each apartment. In the central hall was a trash chute, laundry chute, and dumbwaiter. Opposite the Dowlings' apartment on the first floor was a two-bedroom apartment, a janitor's office, and a garage. The floors above had two one-bedroom apartments on each side of each floor. In the basement was a common laundry room, storage, and an incinerator.

Margaret continued to live in apartment A after William died in 1930, running the building. In 1931 she had architects John Flad and Frank Moulton remodel the original garage and janitor's office into an efficiency apartment. After getting married and leaving her hat shop, Margaret was involved in public charity work - both Catholic and non-sectarian. She chaired fundraising campaigns to build Marshall Hall at Edgewood College and an addition to St. Mary's Hospital. For many years she "served on the board of the Madison Catholic Association, the Madison Catholic Women's Club and the Wisconsin Council of Catholic Women," and as president of the last from 1934 to 1936. She co-chaired the Madison clothes depot, supervising five employees. In 1934 Governor Schmedeman appointed her to a statewide citizens' committee to review highway safety and another to investigate housing problems. In 1936 Governor Philip La Follette appointed her to another to survey conditions at state institutions. During WWII, she was active in USO. More of her many public services are summarized in the NRHP nomination linked below. She lived in her apartment through all this, until she died in 1962.

Mrs. Dowling left the apartment to the local Catholic diocese, which sold it to Theodore and Edna Wetternach in 1963. After Theodore died in 1986, Edna commenced updates, getting the exterior brick tuck-pointed, replacing windows, sealing the roof, refinishing floors, replacing the heating system, and replacing sinks and counters in the apartments, with an eye toward preservation.

In 2002 the apartment was added to the NRHP as a fine example of an early 20th century apartment block, and for its association with Margaret Dowling, who supported various civic organizations in Madison and beyond for many years.
