= Grimm Book Bindery =

- U.S. National Register of Historic Places
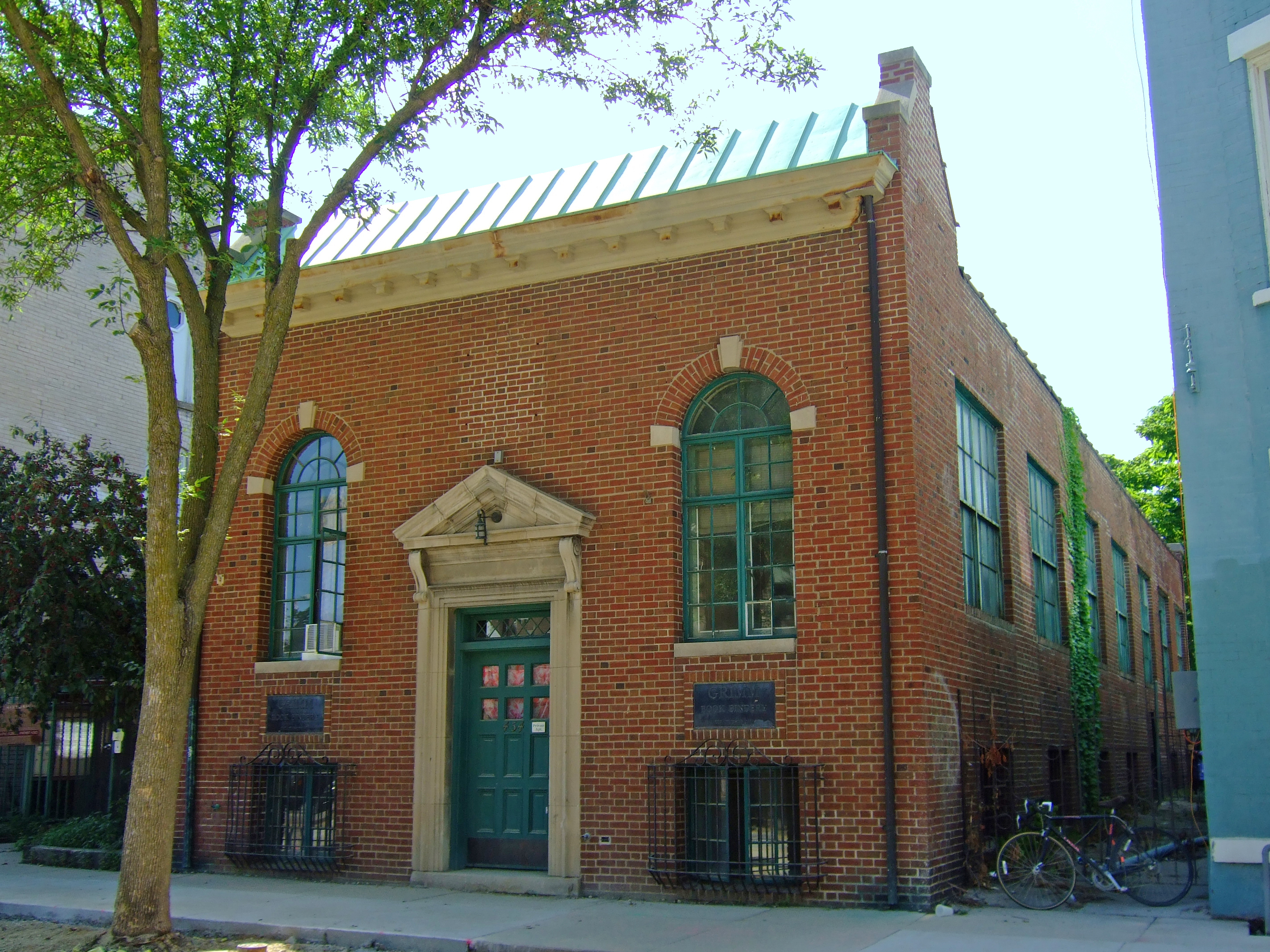
- Grimm Book Bindery
- Location: 454 W. Gilman St., Madison, Wisconsin
- Coordinates: 43°04′26″N 89°23′43″W
- Area: less than one acre
- Built: 1926
- Architect: Alvin Small
- Architectural style: Colonial Revival
- NRHP reference No.: 86000625
- Added to NRHP: April 3, 1986

The Grimm Book Bindery is a small Georgian Revival-styled shop built in 1926 in Madison, Wisconsin for the only dedicated book-binding business in town, run by the Grimm family for 60 years. In 1986 it was added to the National Register of Historic Places.

== History ==
Gottlieb Grimm was a German immigrant who came to Madison in 1850 to work for Charles Weed in his book-bindery. There, Gottlieb is said to have bound the first book in Madison. After 24 years of ups and downs, the immigrant ended up as head of the shop and changed its name to Grimm Book Bindery. The building at that time was in the Journal Block. In 1909 it moved to Carroll Street, and in 1916 they built a shop at 324-328 W. Gorham.

By 1924 Gottlieb's children and grandchildren ran the business, which "bound volumes for the state government, the university, other community libraries, city directories, student theses, and private libraries." Despite this business, the building on West Gorham was too large, so the Grimms decided to build a smaller shop. To design the new shop, they hired Madison architect Alvin Small, who had designed Prairie style homes like the 1914 Louis Hirsig house and Prairie style commercial buildings like the 1914 Eddy store.

For the new Grimm Bindery, Small designed a small shop in Georgian Revival style, similar in style to Ben Franklin's printing shop in Philadelphia. The building is one story on a raised basement, with walls clad in red brick. The front door is centered, framed in classically-styled concrete beneath a small pediment. On each side is a large window with a round arch at the top. Topping the wall is a metal cornice decorated with modillions, beneath a short gable roof facade with a stepped parapet on each end, somewhat like Federal style. Above the front door is a neo-colonial-style sign proclaiming "Grimm BOOK BINDERY." Inside, the front door opened to a staircase which led up to an office on the left and the binding room on the right. The basement held a sewing room.

The Grimms continued business in this building for 60 years, keeping the exterior very intact. Around 1986 they moved their operations to a different building in Monona and the 1926 building was remodeled into apartments. The NRHP nomination at that time nominated the Grimm Bindery as "possibly the best small Georgian Revival commercial building in Madison" and "the work of a locally important architect, Alvin Small."
