= Cletus F. O'Donnell =

American prelate

His Excellency, The Most Reverend Cletus Francis O'Donnell
- Bishop of Madison
- Church: Catholic Church
- Appointed: February 18, 1967
- Term ended: April 28, 1992
- Predecessor: William Patrick O'Connor
- Successor: William Henry Bullock
- Previous post: Auxiliary Bishop of Chicago (1960–1967)

Orders
- Ordination: May 3, 1941 by Samuel Stritch
- Consecration: December 21, 1960 by Albert Gregory Meyer

Personal details
- Born: August 22, 1917 Waukon, Iowa, US
- Died: August 31, 1992 (aged 75) Madison, Wisconsin, US
- Education: Catholic University of America
- Motto: In spem vitae aeternae (in the hope of eternal life)

Ordination history of Cletus F. O'Donnell
History
Episcopal consecration
- Consecrated by: Albert Gregory Meyer (Chicago)
Episcopal succession
Bishops consecrated by Cletus F. O'Donnell as principal consecrator
- Nevin William Hayes, O. Carm.: August 5, 1965
- George Otto Wirz: March 9, 1978

Cletus Francis O'Donnell (August 22, 1917 – August 31, 1992) was an American prelate of the Roman Catholic Church who served as the second bishop of the Diocese of Madison in Wisconsin from 1967 to 1992. He previously served as an auxiliary bishop of the Archdiocese of Chicago in Illinois from 1960 to 1967.

== Biography ==
=== Early life ===
Cletus O'Donnell was born on August 22, 1917, in Waukon, Iowa, to Patrick and Isabel (Duffy) O’Donnell. His father was a banker and his mother was a teacher. The family moved to Chicago in 1927. In 1935, O’Donnell graduated from Archbishop Quigley Preparatory Seminary in Chicago in 1935. A retreat at St. Mary of the Lake Seminary in Mundelein, Illinois, was a motivator for O'Donnell to join the priesthood. In 1941, he received a master's degree from St. Mary.

=== Priesthood ===
O'Donnell was ordained to the priesthood by Cardinal Samuel Stritch on May 3, 1941, for the Archdiocese of Chicago. After his ordination, he was appointed as assistant pastor at Our Lady of Lourdes Parish in Chicago, serving there for a year. In 1942, O'Donnell entered the Catholic University of America in Washington, D.C., earning a Doctor of Canon Law degree in 1945.

Back in Chicago, O'Donnell was appointed as vice chancellor for the archdiocese. He also became promoter of justice and defender of the bond.

=== Auxiliary Bishop of Chicago ===
On October 26, 1960, Pope John XXIII appointed O'Donnell as an auxiliary bishop of the Archdiocese of Chicago. He was consecrated by Cardinal Albert Meyer on December 21, 1960. O'Donnell was also appointed as vicar general and consultor at that time.

After Meyer's death on April 9, 1965, O'Donnell served as archdiocesan administrator until the installation of Archbishop John P. Cody on August 24, 1965. O’Donnell was named pastor of Holy Name Cathedral Parish in February 1966. In November 1966, he named to the administrative board of the National Conference of Catholic Bishops (NCCB). He also served as assistant treasurer and chair of the American Board of Catholic Missions for the NCCB.

=== Bishop of Madison ===
On February 18, 1967, Pope Paul VI appointed O'Donnell as bishop of the Diocese of Madison. As bishop, he founded the diocesan Apostolate to the Handicapped on October 31, 1967. O'Donnell also established ministries for the deaf and the developmentally disabled. He also encouraged adult education and created a religious education consultants program to help individual parishes.

O’Donnell suffered a stroke on September 13, 1990, and then a second one in the spring of 1992 which led him to resign.

=== Retirement and legacy ===
On April 28, 1992, Pope John Paul II accepted O'Donnell resignation. Cletus O'Donnell died of a heart attack on August 31, 1992, in Madison.

In February 1995, several men sued the Diocese of Madison for failing to protect them as minors from acts of sexual abuse by Reverend Michael Trainor, a priest in the diocese, during the 1970s and 1980s. The plaintiffs claimed that O'Donnell was aware of Trainor's abuse of children and transferred him from one parish to another without reporting him to the police or to the parishioners.

== See also ==
- Catholic Church hierarchy
- Catholic Church in the United States
- Historical list of the Catholic bishops of the United States
- List of Catholic bishops of the United States
- Lists of patriarchs, archbishops, and bishops

Catholic Church titles
| Preceded by William Patrick O'Connor | Bishop of Madison; 1967–1992 | Succeeded by William Henry Bullock |
| Preceded by – | Auxiliary Bishop of Chicago; 1960–1967 | Succeeded by – |
