= Sherman Avenue Historic District =

Historic district in Wisconsin, United States

- U.S. National Register of Historic Places
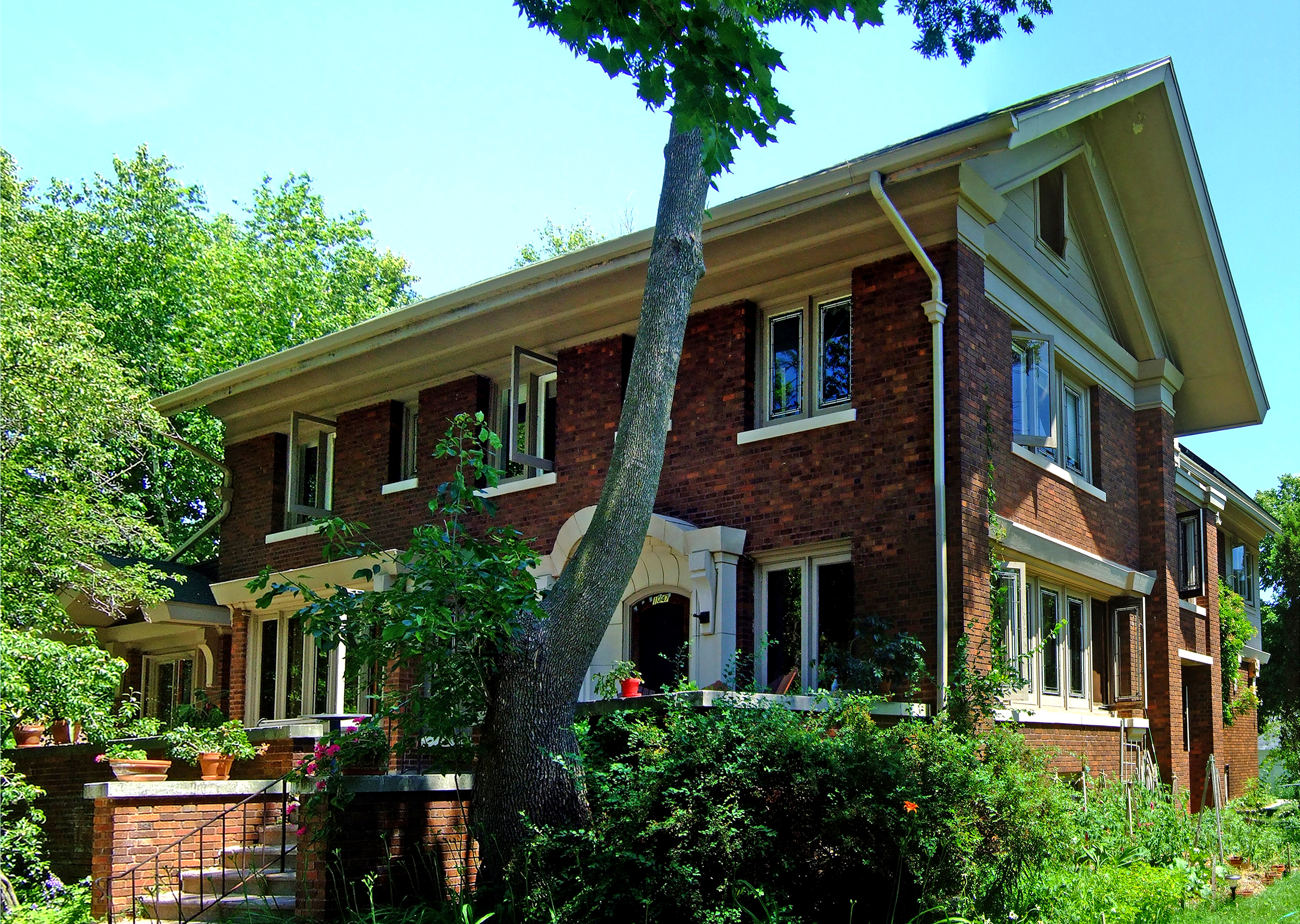
- Hokanson house, Prairie style, 1916
- Location: Sherman Avenue, roughly between North Brearly Street and Marston Avenue; Madison, Wisconsin; United States
- Area: 18 acres (7.3 ha)
- NRHP reference No.: 88000216
- Added to NRHP: March 22, 1988

The Sherman Avenue Historic District is a historic neighborhood along Lake Mendota on the east end of the isthmus in Madison, Wisconsin, United States, consisting mostly of middle class houses built from the mid 1890s to the late 1920s. In 1988 the district was listed on the National Register of Historic Places.

== History ==
The area along Sherman Avenue was part of James Doty's original 1836 plat of Madison, but because much of the area was marshy, it developed later than other parts of Madison like the busy town center around the capitol. However, in 1850 Leonard Farwell straightened and dammed the Yahara River and built a saw and flour mill on a hill across the Yahara. Tibbets and Gordon built a brewery in the same area at the same time. In 1854 a house was built at what would become the corner of Brearly and Gorham Streets. When not a muddy mess, Sherman Avenue became a popular route for outings east along Lake Mendota to the brewery and to the scenic area that would become Maple Bluff. Otherwise this marshy area remained undeveloped until the 1890s.

In the early 1890s Madison was growing, spreading out into suburbs. Lakefront lots were in demand, and several developers began filling the marsh along Sherman Avenue to make the lots viable for homes. The Willow Park Land Company dredged sand and rock from nearby Lake Mendota and deposited thousands of cubic feet per day on their Willow Park subdivision. Gay's Northside subdivision was also filled, and Lenzer's replat, and Park's subdivision. Between 1895 and 1900 fourteen homes were built in this new neighborhood. The first was at 1228 Sherman for John Erdall, an executive of the Willow Park company. Generally the houses on the lakeward side of Sherman were for middle class families and those away from the lake were for working class.

Just to the east, starting around 1899, the Madison Parks and Pleasure Drive Association assembled the parcels that would become Tenney Park. Much of this land too was marshy and had to be filled. The nearby park made the neighborhood more attractive.

Home construction in the subdivisions along Sherman Street continued in the 1920s. The area attracted a variety of residents, but the bigger homes tended to be for businessmen from downtown more than professionals. By the 1930s the neighborhood was full.

In 1988 the district was listed on the NRHP as a relatively intact "turn-of-the-century working and middle-class neighborhood," with excellent examples of various architectural styles and some representative works from important Madison architects. The district was added to the State Register of Historic Places the following year.

== Example homes ==
These are some good examples of different styles in the district, in roughly the order built.

- The first house in the new Willow Park subdivision was built in 1895 for John and Bertha Erdall. John was a Norwegian lawyer and the secretary of the Willow Park Land Company, the developer. Their house is considered Queen Anne style and displays several hallmarks of the style: the asymmetric façade, the tower off to one side, the complex roof, and the varied surface textures in the types of shingles. Not so typical is the extent of the shingles and the curved flare at the top of the first story, which is more Shingle style. A missing hallmark of Queen Anne is the absence of a wraparound porch.
- The Bartlett house at 1050 Sherman Avenue is a Dutch Colonial Revival-style house built in 1902. The hallmark of this style is the gambrel (barn-shaped) roof, along with the Colonial Revival details: the Tuscan columns of the porch, the pediments and pilasters on the dormers, and the Palladian windows.
- The Schubert house at 1118 Sherman Ave is a Craftsman-style house designed by Claude and Starck and built in 1905. The hallmark of this style is the exposed rafter tails. The stucco exterior is also common to the style. Otherwise, this is an unusual Craftsman - rather large at 2.5 stories, with an odd porch, corner pilasters, and a dormer window in the style of George Maher.

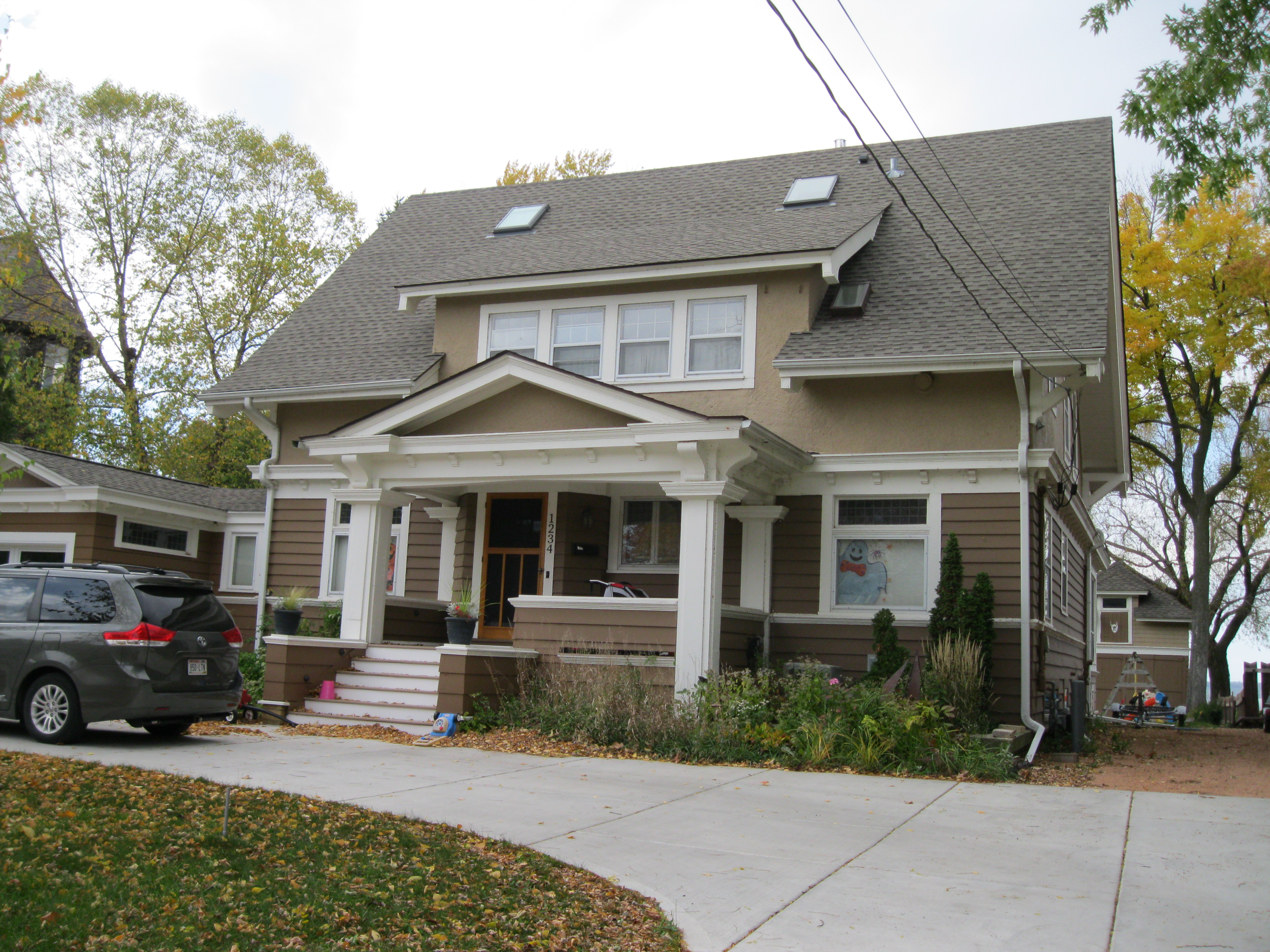
Pfister house, Bungalow, 1910

- The Pfister house at 1234 Sherman Avenue is a 2-story bungalow designed by August Schwenn and built in 1910. The term "bungalow" generally means a modest-sized house with some of the living space within the roof. This bungalow is larger than most, with a heavy porch and a large shed-roofed dormer.

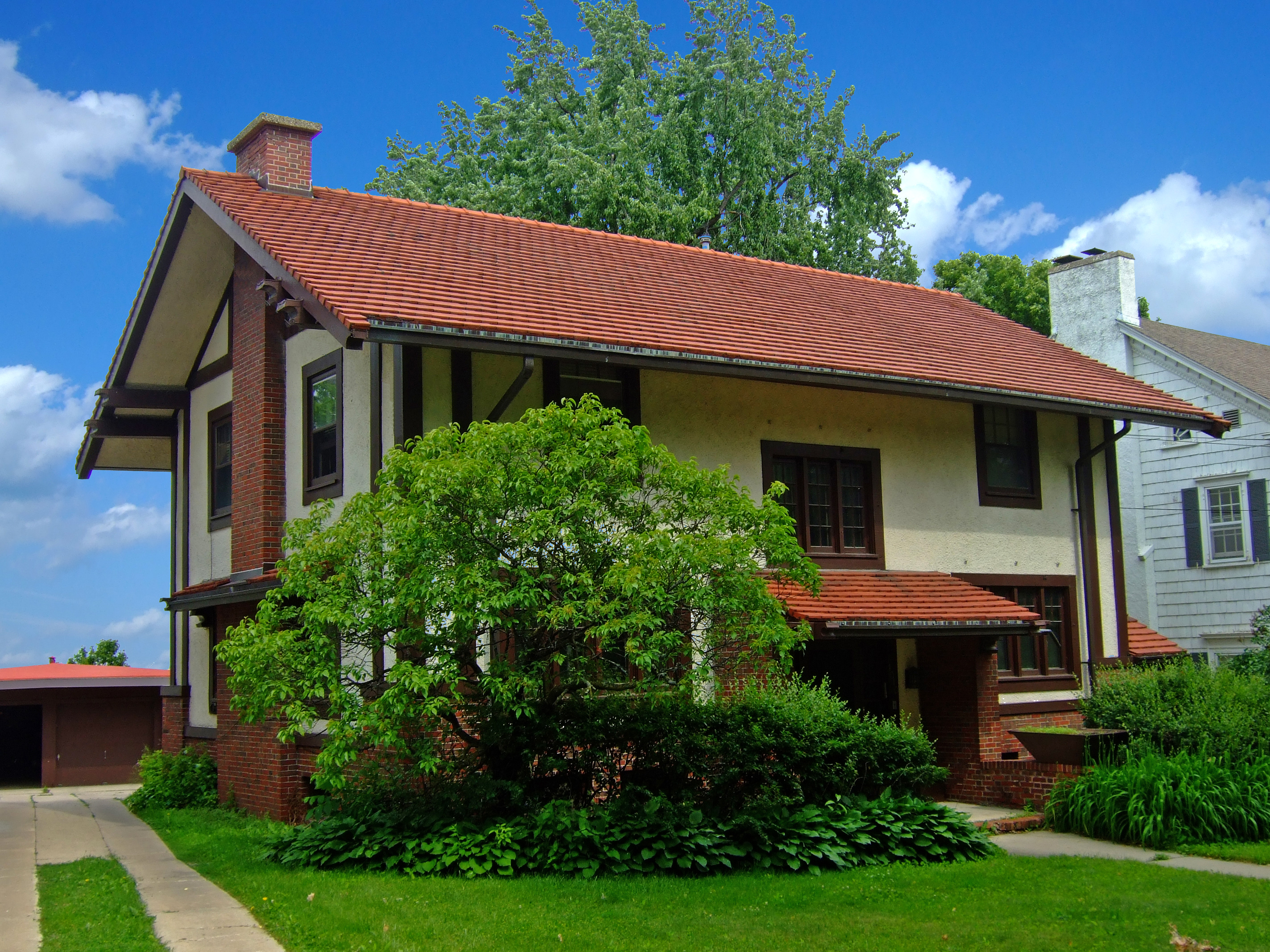
Hirsig house, Prairie Style, c. 1913

- The Louis Hirsig House at 1010 Sherman Ave is a simple Prairie Style cottage designed by Alvan Small and built in 1913. Hallmarks of this style are the horizontal emphasis in the broad eaves and the low-pitched roof. The stucco is typical too. Louis worked his way up from tinsmith to partnership in a hardware store on the capitol square.
- The Hokanson house at 1047 Sherman Ave is a large Prairie Style house designed by Claude and Starck and built in 1916. This house has a T-shaped footprint with broad eaves and bands of casement windows that emphasize the horizontal. A raised terrace surrounded by a brick wall spans the front of the house, and the front door is surrounded by a modernist stone frame. Emil Hokanson was a Swedish immigrant who arrived in 1902, started as a mechanic, and by 1916 was a partner with his brother in a large auto distributing business.

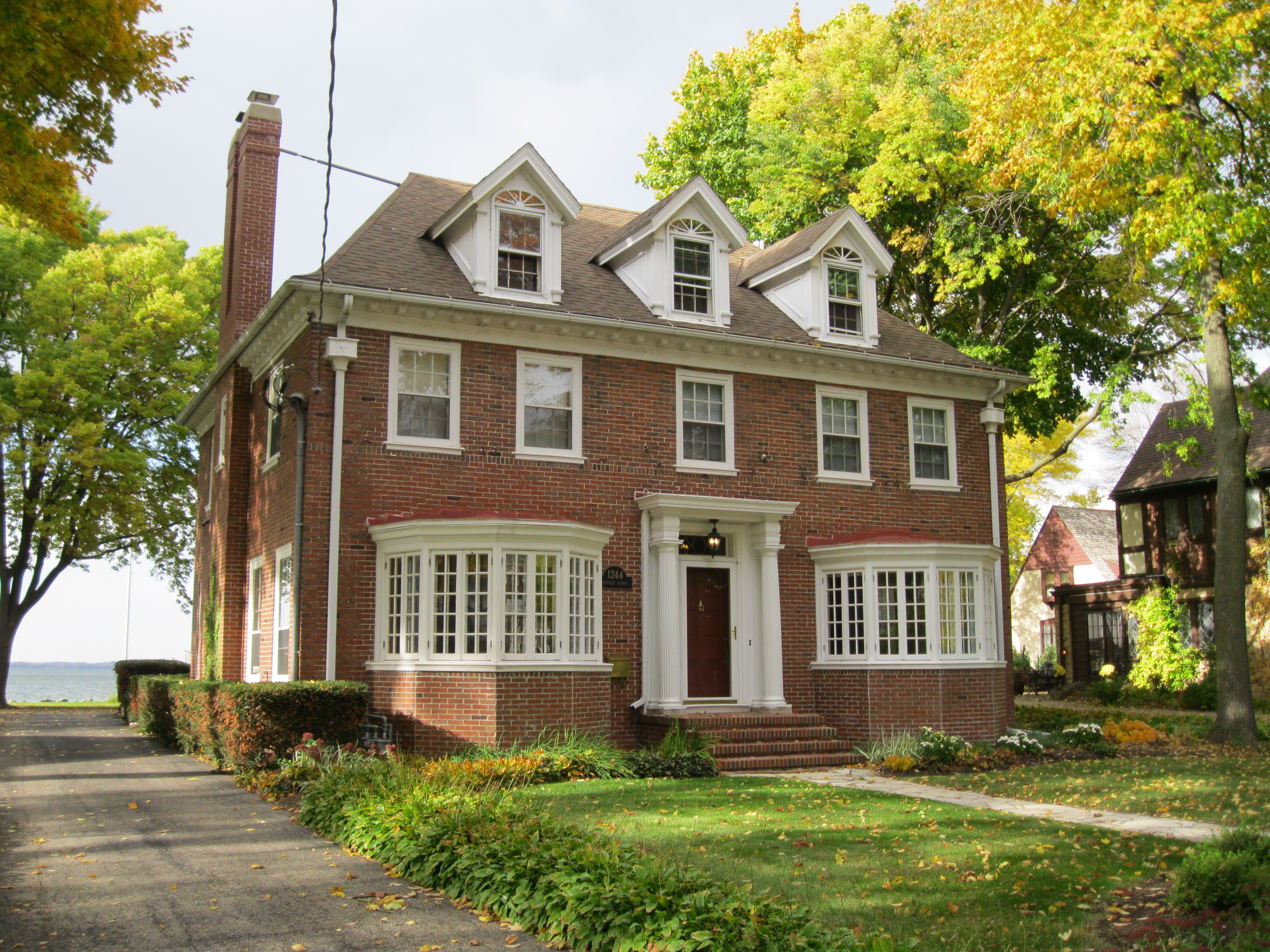
Warner house, Georgian Revival, 1922

- The Warner house at 1244 Sherman Avenue is a red brick Georgian Revival house designed by Frank Riley and built in 1922. Hallmarks of this style are the formal, symmetric façade, the classical framing of the front door, the many-paned windows, and the color scheme of white trim against red brick. The three dormers were not part of the original design. In a few years Harry would go on to build another house next door at 1250.

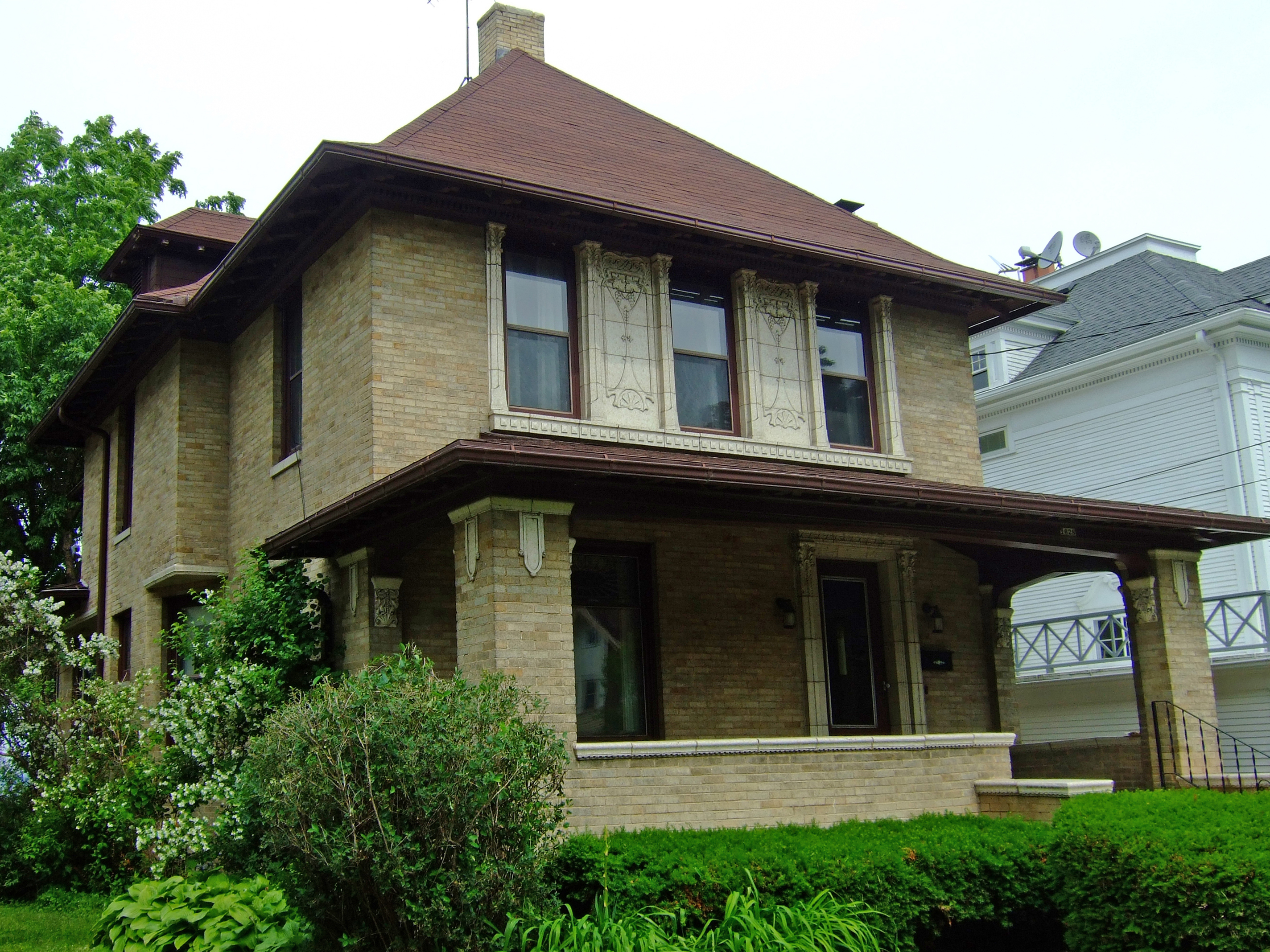
Doyle house, Prairie Style(?), 1902 & 1928

- The Doyle house at 1028 Sherman Avenue was built in 1902, originally hip-roofed with wood siding. In 1928 it was remodeled by Claude and Starck, with broad eaves and stained glass drawn from Prairie Style, and terra cotta trim that is more from Louis Sullivan.

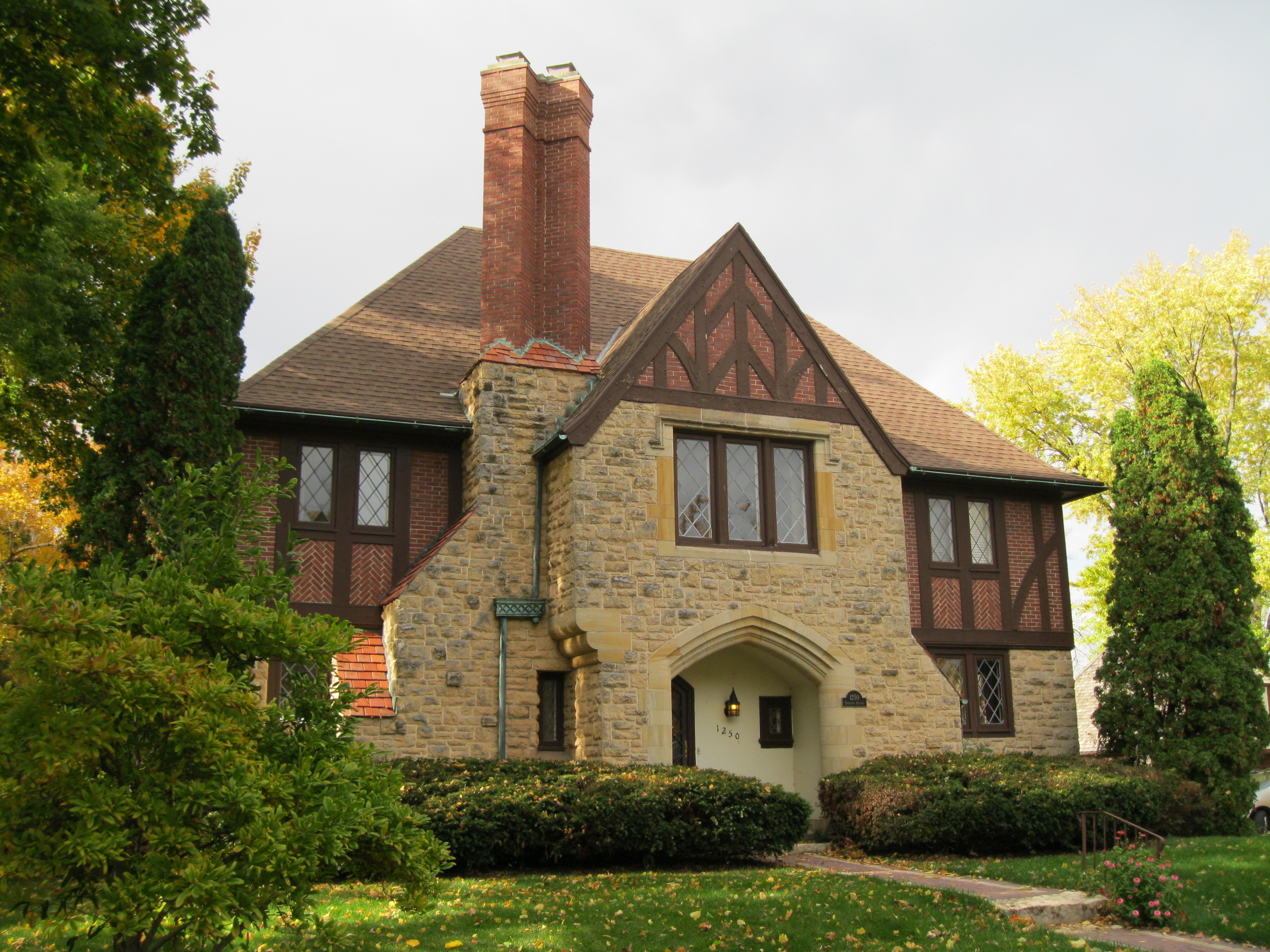
Warner house, Tudor Revival, 1929

- The Warner house at 1250 Sherman Avenue is a large Tudor Revival-style house, designed by Frank M. Riley and built in 1929. Hallmarks of this style are the steeply pitched roof, the imposing chimney and front-facing gable, the stonework, the half-timbering, and the diamond-paned windows. This particular house features warm colors and an unusual chimney with two flues angled 45 degrees from the rest of the house. Harry Warner was a stockbroker.

== See also ==
- National Register of Historic Places listings in Madison, Wisconsin
