= George Otto Wirz =

Roman Catholic auxiliary bishop

- Auxiliary Bishop of Madison
- In office: 1978-2004

Orders
- Ordination: May 31, 1952
- Consecration: March 9, 1978

Personal details
- Born: January 17, 1929 Monroe, Wisconsin
- Died: November 23, 2010 (aged 81) Madison, Wisconsin

George Otto Wirz (January 17, 1929 – November 23, 2010) served as a Roman Catholic auxiliary bishop of the Diocese of Madison, Wisconsin and titular bishop of Municipa.

== Biography ==
Born in Monroe, Wisconsin, Wirz was ordained to the priesthood for the Madison Diocese on May 31, 1952. Bishop Wirz was the founding rector of the Holy Name Seminary.

On December 20, 1977, he was appointed auxiliary bishop of the Madison Diocese and was consecrated on March 9, 1978.

Bishop Wirz retired on February 10, 2004, and died in Madison, Wisconsin at age 81.

Catholic Church titles
Preceded by –	Auxiliary Bishop of Madison; 1978–2004	Succeeded by –
