= Shorewood Historic District =

Historic district in Wisconsin, United States

- U.S. National Register of Historic Places
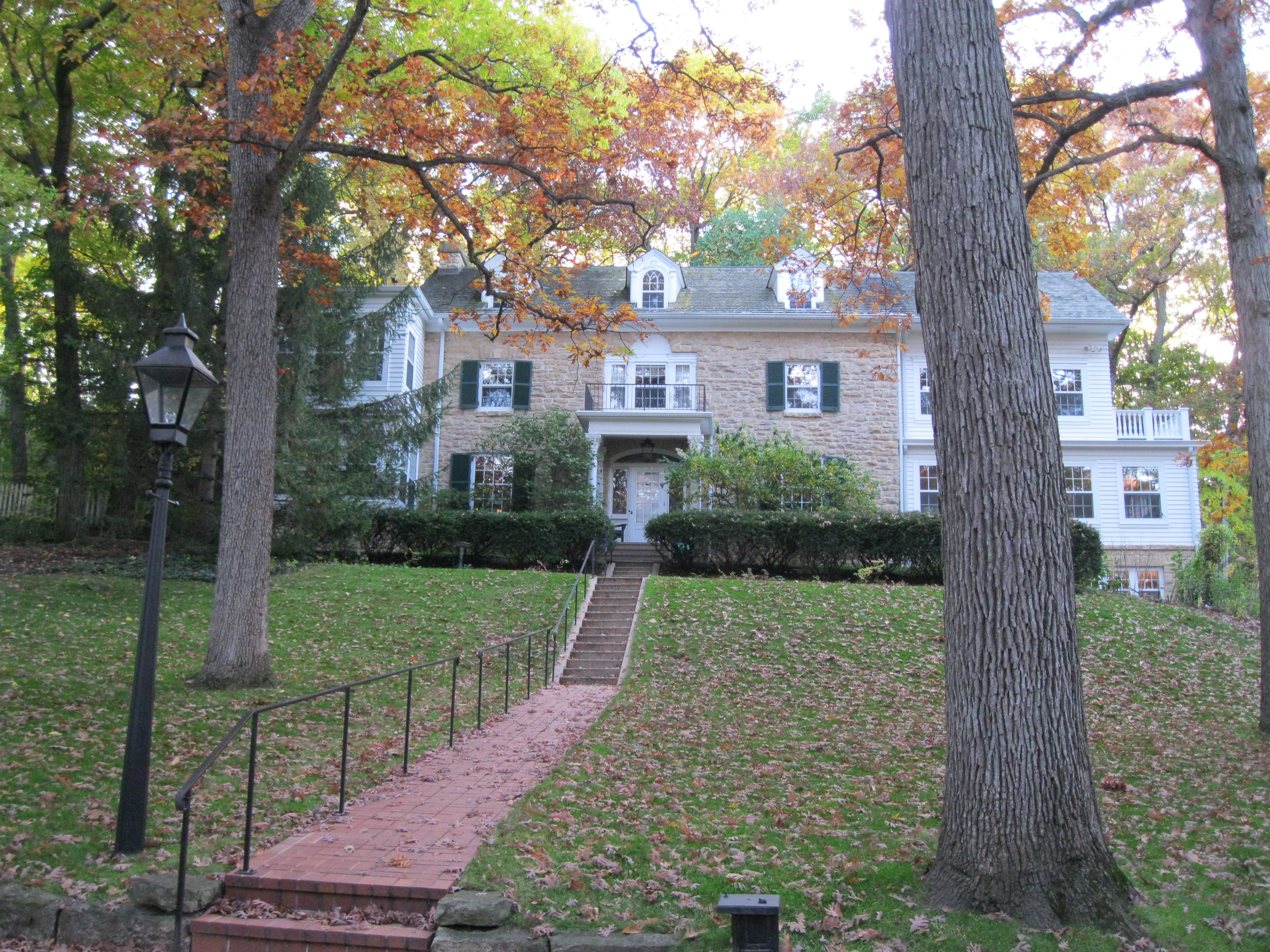
- Davis house, Georgian Revival, 1927
- Location: Roughly bounded by Lake Mendota Dr., Tallyho Ln., Shorewood Blvd., and the Blackhawk Country Club, Shorewood Hills, Wisconsin
- Area: 133 acres (54 ha)
- NRHP reference No.: 02001432
- Added to NRHP: November 29, 2002

The Shorewood Historic District is a large neighborhood on the west side of Shorewood Hills, Wisconsin - homes built in various styles between 1924 and 1963. In 2002 the district was listed on the National Register of Historic Places.

The neighborhood was platted between 1922 and 1926 on a hill called Mendota Heights facing Lake Mendota, and is accessed by streets that curve to follow the contours of the hill. The district is large, with 247 contributing properties. Here are examples of a few styles, in the order built:

- The McKenna house at 3401 Lake Mendota Dr. is an Arts and Crafts-style house built in 1924, two stories, with a low-pitched roof and wide eaves rolled at the edges to suggest the thatched roof of an English cottage. It was designed by Grant M. Hyde, a journalism professor at UW-Madison who had majored in architecture. McKenna was the real estate developer who founded Shorewood Hills.
- The Fagan house at 3424 Viburnum Drive is also Arts and Crafts, also simply decorated and with multi-pane windows, but it has steeper rooflines more like Tudor Revival. It was designed by Balch and Lippert and built in 1926.
- The Geisler house at 1518 Sumac Drive is a Tudor Revival house designed by Edward Tough and built in 1926, with a characteristic stone and stucco exterior and half-timbering.
- The Gifford house at 3441 Crestwood Dr. is a French Normandy Revival-styled house designed by Law, Law & Potter and built in 1926, with characteristic hipped roof, wall dormers, and multi-pane casement windows.
- The Horner house at 3515 Blackhawk Drive is a large Mediterranean Revival home designed by Law, Law & Potter and built in 1926, with characteristic tile roof and round-arched doors and windows.
- The Davis house at 1124 Oak Way, pictured above, is a Georgian Revival-styled house designed by Doris Baldwin Mohs and built in 1927. It has a symmetric facade and a Palladian window above the front door - both characteristic of this style.

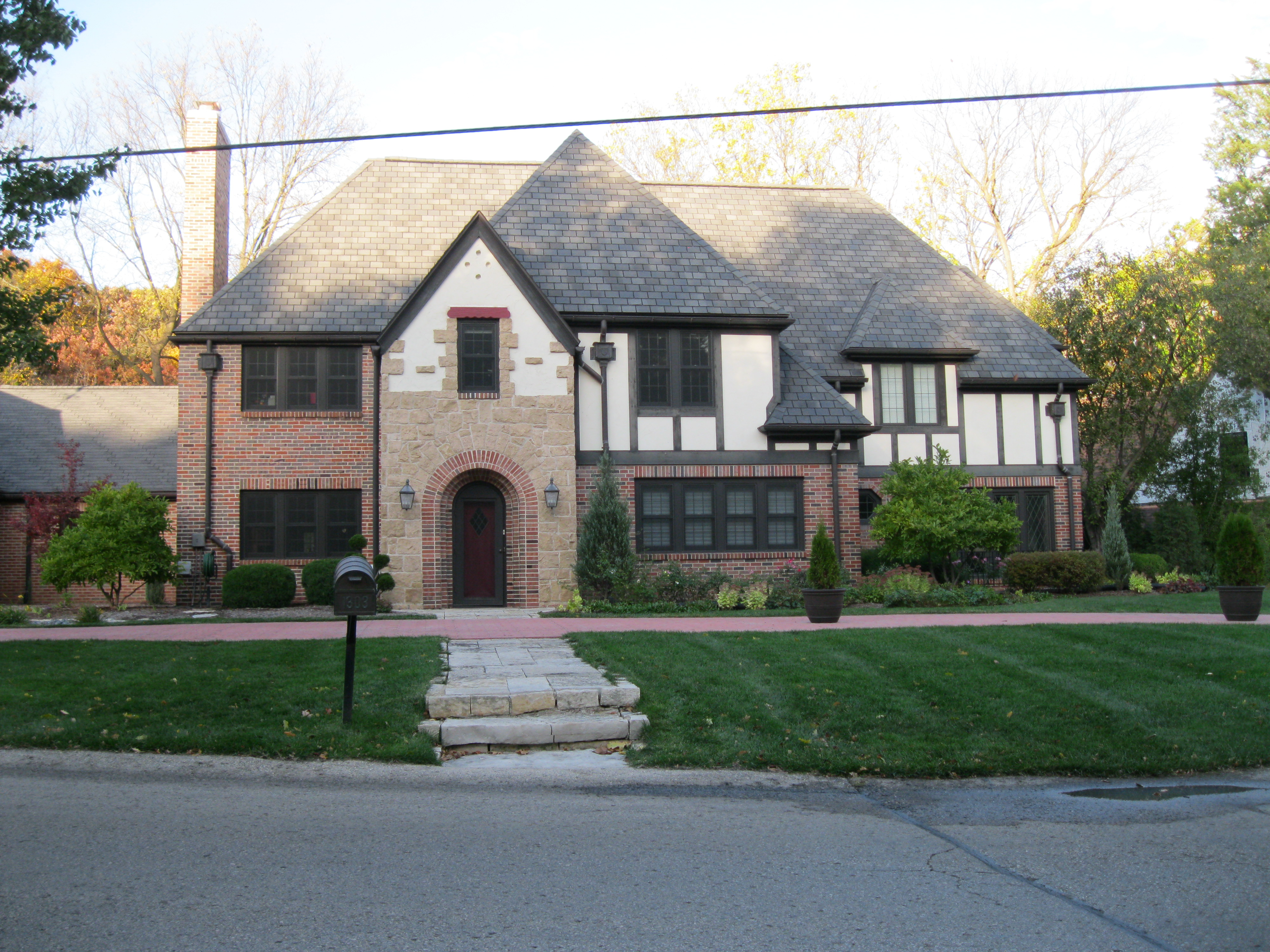
Llittig house, Tudor Revival, 1931

- The Llittig house at 1303 Edgehill Drive is another Tudor Revival house, built in 1931, with an exterior of brick, stone and half-timbered stucco.
- The Oldenburg house at 1130 Shorewood Blvd is a Contemporary-styled house designed by Balch & Lippert and built in 1936. With a small upright second story suggesting a pilot house, it was called "Steamboat around the Bend."
- The Hall house at 1506 Wood Lane is a Colonial Revival-styled house built in 1937 - one of many with symmetric facades.
- The Rowell house at 3405 Blackhawk Dr. is a Colonial Revival-styled house built in 1937 with an asymmetrical facade, and with some of its outside walls clad in stone.
- The Kaeser house at 3505 Blackhawk Drive is a Prairie School house designed by the owner's brother William V. Kaeser and built in 1937. Typical of this style, it has horizontal emphasis, a low-pitched roof, and touches that feel a bit Oriental.
- The Hartshorne house at 3218 Topping Rd. is an International-style house designed by Beatty & Strang and built in 1941, typically boxy and simple. The firm designed eight other houses in the neighborhood.
- The Bloomfield house at 1010 Edgehill Drive is a Contemporary-styled home built in 1963 which curves above its hillside driveway.
