= Saint Raphael's Cathedral (Madison, Wisconsin) =

Roman Catholic cathedral in Madison, Wisconsin

Coordinates: 43°04′20.26″N 89°23′10.48″W

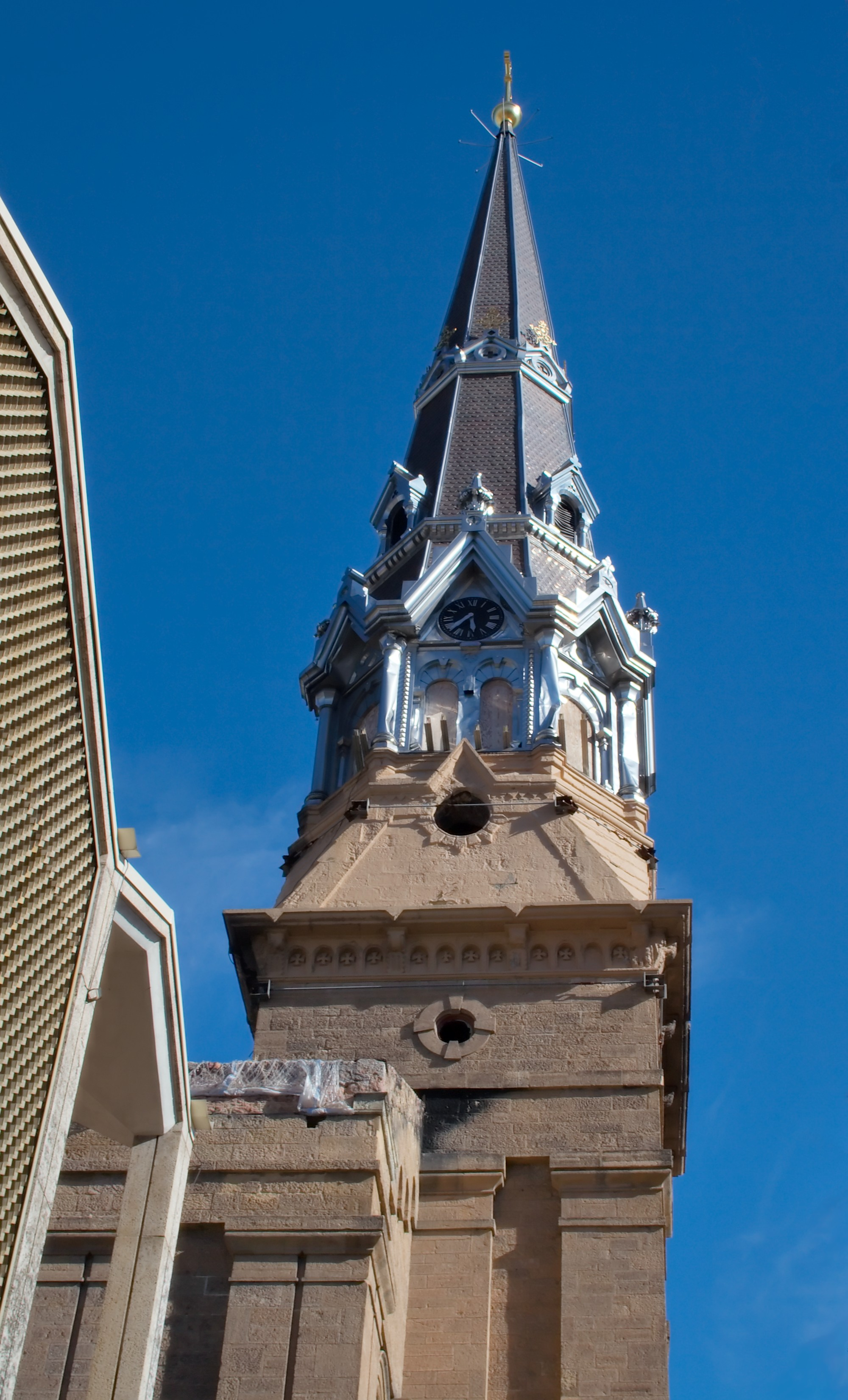
St. Raphael's in 2006, with a new spire

Saint Raphael's Cathedral was the cathedral and a parish for the Roman Catholic Diocese of Madison and was located in downtown Madison, Wisconsin at 222 West Main Street. In March 2005, the Cathedral building located at 204 West Main Street was heavily damaged in a fire and was demolished. In late 2012, the diocese constructed a park on the site, called Cathedral Square or Cathedral Place featuring a Way of the Cross. In 2023, it was announced that St. Bernard's Church in Madison would be named the new cathedral rather than build a new cathedral at the St. Raphael site.

== History ==
In the early 1840s, immigrants from Ireland settled in what would later become Madison. They were soon organized into a parish named after the Archangel Raphael. On August 15, 1842, Father Martin Kundig offered Mass for the first time in the old territorial capitol building. Governor James Duane Doty, a close friend of Father Samuel Mazzuchelli donated the land upon which the parish buildings and a later parking lot would be built.

From 1842 until 1853, the parish did not have a church and often celebrated Mass in homes and in the state capitol. The first frame church building was constructed in 1848. It measured 20 by 24 feet (6.1 by 7.3 m), but was sufficient size for the congregation at that time. In 1853, Father Francis Etchmann began constructing the most recent church building. The cornerstone was laid on May 28, 1854, by Bishop John Henni of the Diocese of Milwaukee. He dedicated the new building because the parish was under his jurisdiction at the time. The spire and bells were added in 1885. A rectory was added in 1897, and a new school building was dedicated in 1911.

On January 9, 1946, Pope Pius XII created the Diocese of Madison for an 11-county area in the southwestern part of the state. Territory was taken from the Archdiocese of Milwaukee and the Diocese of La Crosse to form the new diocese. St. Raphael's was then chosen as the Cathedral church for the Madison diocese. At the time of the parish's elevation to a cathedral, Msgr. William Mahoney was the pastor. Bishop William O’Connor was installed in St. Raphael's as the first Bishop of Madison on March 12, 1946.

In October 1952 plans were announced to renovate St. Raphael's to better function as a cathedral. Construction began the following year. The Madison architecture firm John Flad & Associates and Rambusch Decorating Company of New York City were responsible for the plans. A basement was dug out below the church building and a parish hall, kitchen, cloakroom, and other facilities were created there. A new two-story sacristy connected the cathedral and the rectory. The old sacristies, altars, and the back wall were removed to create more liturgical space. A new marble altar with an oak canopy and a mosaic of St. Raphael and Tobias were installed. The marble for the altar came from Florence and the mosaic was created in Venice. The renovation also included new lighting, interior decorating, confessionals, and Stations of the Cross. Cardinal Samuel Stritch, the Archbishop of Chicago and former Archbishop of Milwaukee, rededicated the renovated cathedral on March 10, 1955.

=== Cathedral fire ===
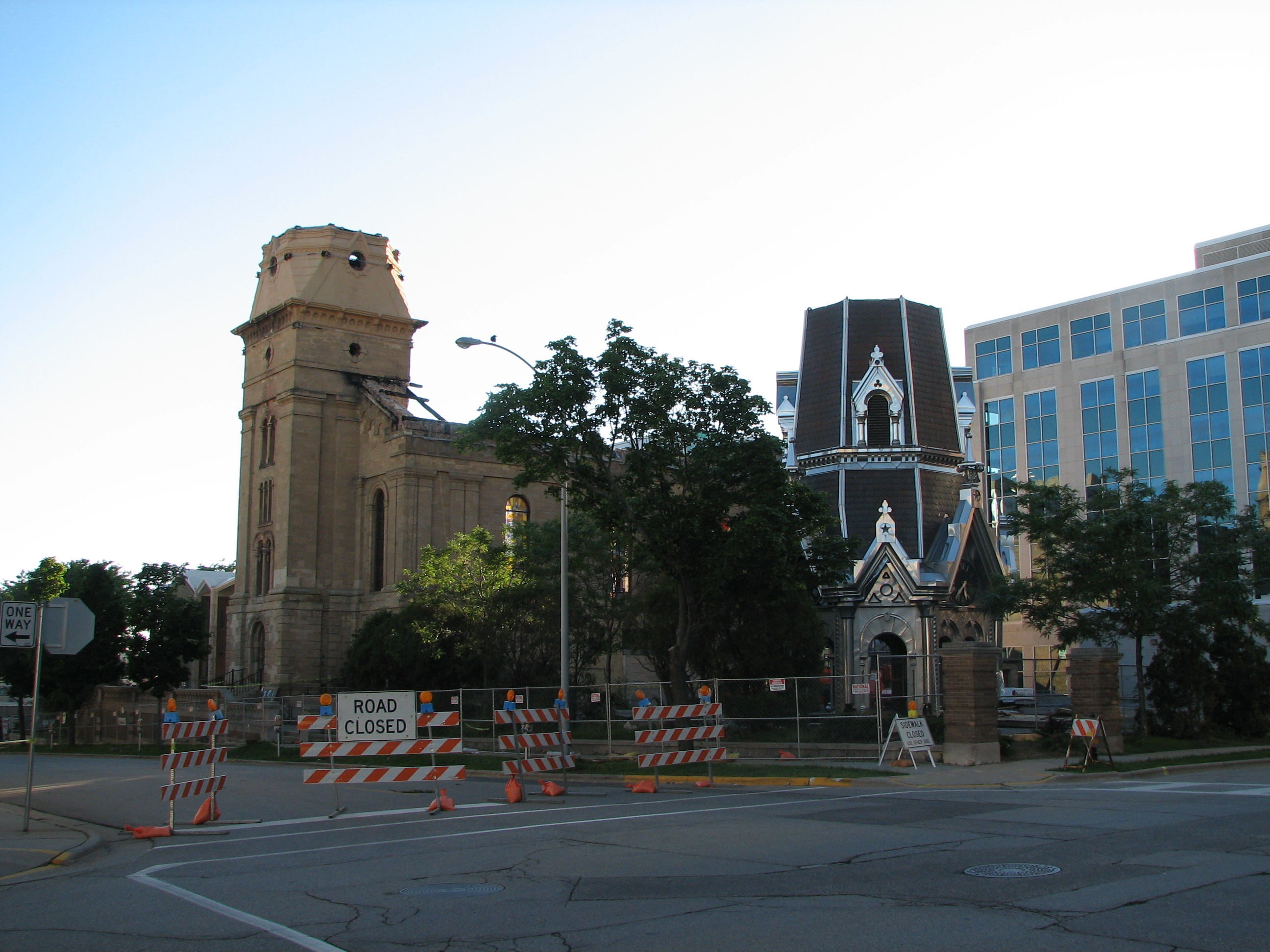
St. Raphael's undergoing de-construction in 2008

On March 14, 2005, a fire caused extensive damage to St. Raphael's Cathedral, affecting not only those who attended the church, but the entire diocesan community.

The fire caused the roof to collapse into the building, although the walls and steeple remained standing. There was further damage from the water and fears that the refurbished steeple would collapse, although the steeple was found to be stable in the days following the fire. The mosaics sustained smoke and water damage, and the stained glass windows were damaged but still in place.

The cause of the fire was determined to be arson. Forty-one-year-old William J. "Billy" Connell was arrested for setting the fire and charged with burglary, arson, and bail jumping. Connell said that he had broken into the Cathedral using a crowbar, stole a bottle of wine, and then "messed around with some stuff". The fire started in an office/storeroom under the spire, and the crowbar was found in that room. Connell had a history of mental problems, and had previously been in trouble with the law. Connell was sentenced to 15 years in prison to be followed by 15 years of close supervision.

On June 10, 2007, Bishop Morlino announced his intention to have the structure demolished and replaced with a new and larger church capable of seating 1,000 people. The Diocese of Madison announced on March 13, 2008, that St. Raphael's would be demolished by June of that year and that some items from the old Cathedral would be saved, including the spire, the three bells from the steeple, three mosaics from the sanctuary, the marble sanctuary appointments, one large undamaged stained glass window, three smaller undamaged semicircular stained glass windows, some ornamental stonework from around the doorways, and some other stone from the building. The demolition plan sparked debate among some in the city who felt portions of the structure should be preserved or declared a landmark.

On July 1, 2008, the parish of St. Raphael merged with the nearby parishes of St. Patrick and Holy Redeemer to form a new Cathedral Parish of St. Raphael. The plan at the time was for the parish to be housed in facilities of the two churches until a new cathedral could be built.

On June 24, 2011, the parish purchased the structure it built in 1962 to house St. Raphael's School from 1963 until it closed in 1970. The parish demolished the building and in late 2012 created a park across the entire property featuring a Way of the Cross.

=== New cathedral ===
In December 2022, Bishop Donald Hying outlined three proposals to settle the cathedral question as part of the Into the Deep strategic planning process for the diocese: build a new cathedral on the site of the old cathedral, maintain the current status quo of no cathedral while utilizing facilities of the diocese for diocesan events, and elevate an existing parish church for the cathedral. He rejected building a new cathedral as too expensive, and the status quo as undesirable. In January 2023, the bishop proposed that he petition the Holy See to name St. Bernard's Church in Madison as the diocesan cathedral. This would require less of a financial burden and the plan could be accomplished with a small capital campaign to raise the necessary funds.

Bishop Hying held a press conference on January 24, 2024, to officially make public the decision of the Holy See to name St. Bernard's as the new cathedral for the Diocese of Madison. Once a $15 million renovation project of the church building is completed in mid-2025, St. Bernard's will be consecrated as the cathedral.

== See also ==
- List of Catholic cathedrals in the United States
- List of cathedrals in the United States
