= Diocese of Madison =

Diocese of the Catholic Church in Wisconsin

Coordinates: 43°03′04″N 89°31′06″W

Diocese of Madison Diœcesis Madisonensis
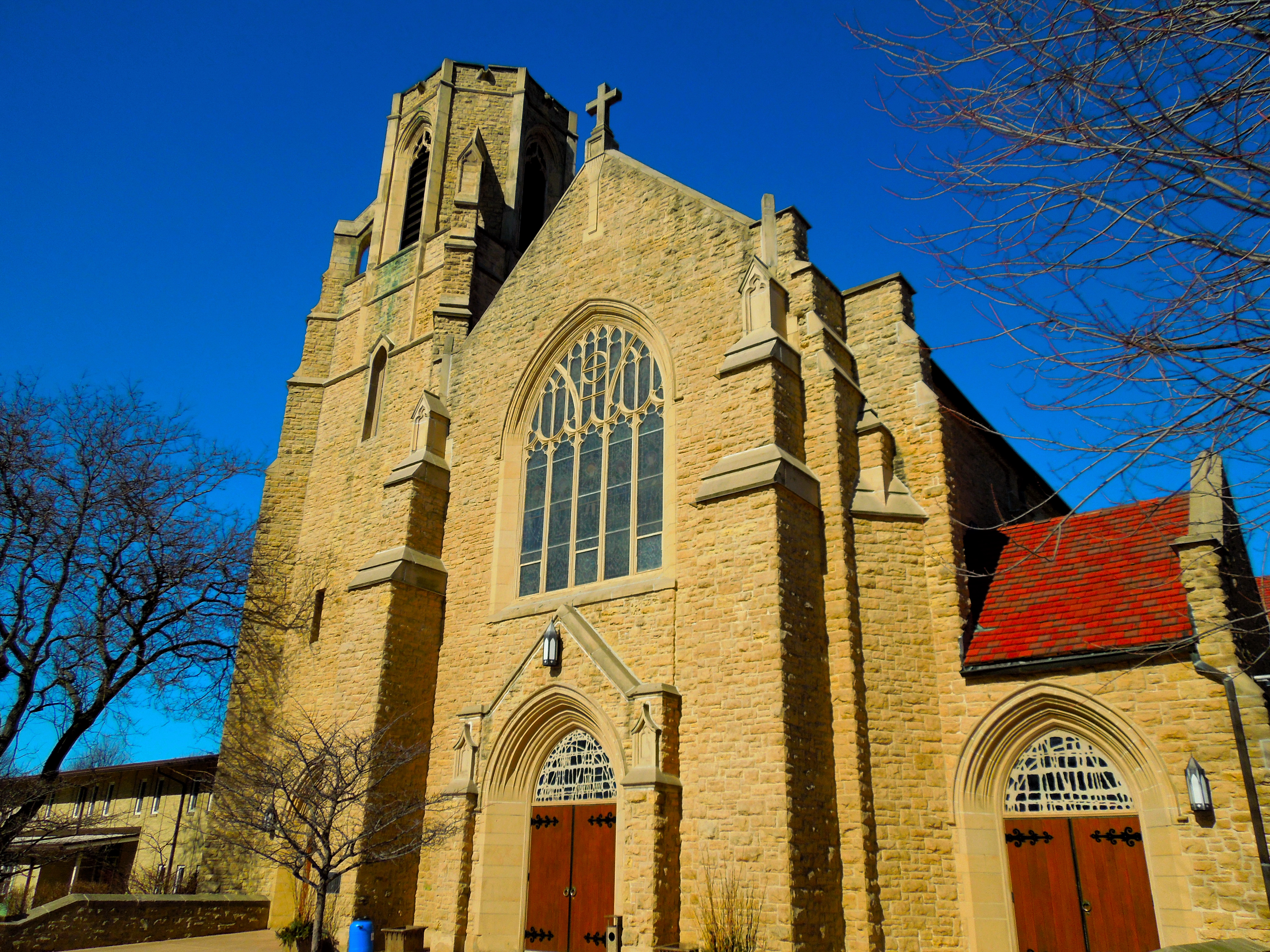
- St. Bernard Catholic Church

- Coat of arms

- Flag

Location
- Country: United States
- Territory: Counties of Columbia, Dane, Grant, Green, Green Lake, Iowa, Jefferson, Lafayette, Marquette, Rock and Sauk, Wisconsin
- Ecclesiastical province: Milwaukee

Statistics
- Area: 8,070 sq mi (20,900 km^{2})
- Population: Total; Catholics: (as of 2020); 1,068,466; 166,923 (16%)
- Parishes: 102
- Schools: 46

Information
- Denomination: Catholic
- Sui iuris church: Latin Church
- Rite: Roman Rite
- Established: January 9, 1946 (80 years ago)
- Cathedral: Saint Raphael's Cathedral (1946–2005); St. Bernard Catholic Church (2025–)

Current leadership
- Pope: Leo XIV
- Bishop: Donald J. Hying
- Metropolitan Archbishop: Jeffrey S. Grob

Map
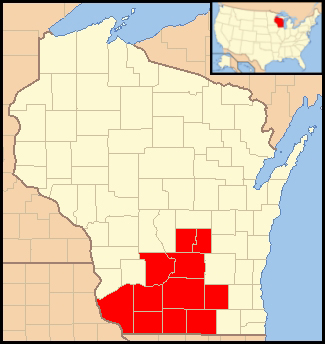

Website
- madisondiocese.org

The Diocese of Madison (Latin: Diœcesis Madisonensis) is a Roman Catholic diocese in the southwestern part of Wisconsin in the United States. The bishop is Donald J. Hying. St. Bernard Catholic Church is the cathedral.

== Territory ==
The Diocese of Madison comprises Columbia, Dane, Grant, Green, Green Lake, Iowa, Jefferson, Lafayette, Marquette, Rock, and Sauk counties. The area of the diocese is approximately 8,070 square miles (20,900 km^{2}).

== History ==
=== 1630 to 1800 ===
The first Catholic presence in present-day Wisconsin was that of French Catholic missionaries in the Green Bay area in the 17th century. When French explorer Jean Nicolet entered the Green Bay in 1634, he was followed by Jesuit missionaries. Wisconsin became part of the French colony of New France, with Catholics under the jurisdiction of the Diocese of Quebec.

The first catholic missionary in the Superior region was René Menard, a French Jesuit missionary who was fluent in the Ojibwe, Odawa, and Huron dialects. In Spring 1661, he explored to Chequamegon Bay on Lake Superior. In 1665, Claude Allouez started a Catholic mission near Chequamegon Bay, naming it the Mission of the Holy Ghost. In 1669, Jacques Marquette arrived at the mission after Allouez moved to the Fox River Valley. Marquette baptized over 1,000 converts. In 1669, Allouez and Marquette established St. Joseph in La Pointe, but it was later abandoned.

Allouez celebrated Mass with a Native American tribe near present-day Oconto, Wisconsin in December 1669, the feast of St. Francis Xavier. He established the Saint Francis Xavier Mission there. The mission moved to Red Banks for a short time in 1671, and then to De Pere, where it remained until 1687, when it was burned. The missionaries worked with the Fox, Sauk, and Winnebago tribes, protected by Fort Francis near Green Bay. When Fort Francis was destroyed in 1728, the missionaries left the area.

When the British took control of New France in 1763 after the French and Indian Wars, the bishops in Quebec continued to have jurisdiction in the region. After the end of the American Revolution in 1783, Great Britain ceded all of the Midwestern Region to the new United States.

In 1791 Pope Pius VI erected the Diocese of Baltimore. It covered all the American states and the Northwest Territory, which included part of present-day Wisconsin. The rest of Wisconsin became part of the United States in the Louisiana Purchase of 1803.

=== 1800 to 1843 ===
Catholic jurisdiction for the new Wisconsin Territory passed to the Diocese of Bardstown in 1808, then the Diocese of Cincinnati in 1826. The first new Catholic church in the Wisconsin area in over 100 years was constructed in Fort Howard in 1825. Its parishioners included many French Canadians living in the settlement.

In 1833, the new Diocese of Detroit assumed jurisdiction over the Wisconsin Territory. In 1837, the missionary Florimund J. Bonduel traveled from Green Bay to visit the French fur trader Solomon Juneau in Milwaukee. While in Milwaukee, Bonduel celebrated the first mass in that city.

Later in 1837, the Diocese of Detroit sent Patrick Kelly to Milwaukee to serve as its first resident priest. Kelly celebrated mass in the Milwaukee courthouse until 1839, when he opened St. Peter's, the first Catholic church in the city. In 1841, Coadjutor Bishop Pierre-Paul Lefevere of Detroit visited Milwaukee.

=== 1843 to 1946 ===
In November 1843, Pope Gregory XVI erected the Diocese of Milwaukee, taking its territory from the Diocese of Detroit. The new diocese covered all of the Wisconsin Territory, including part of present-day Minnesota. During the mid-19th century, Samuel Mazzuchelli established 11 parishes in the Madison area.

In 1846, Catholic residents of Beloit, Wisconsin, founded St. Thomas the Apostle Parish, the first parish in that city. Wisconsin achieved statehood in 1848. That same year, the first Catholic church in Madison, St. Raphael, was founded.Pope Pius IX established the Diocese of Lacrosse and the Diocese of Green Bay in 1868. The Madison region would remain part of these three dioceses for the next 78 years.

In 1871, the Dominican Sisters of Sinsinawa established the Saint Regina Academy for girls and boys in Madison. Saint Paul's Catholic Student Center, serving the University of Wisconsin Madison community, was founded in 1906. The Sisters of St. Mary in 1912 opened St. Mary's Hospital in Madison. Today it is SSM Health St. Mary's Hospital - Madison. Delia Ringling of the Ringling Brothers family, in 1922 donated her house in Baraboo to the Sisters of St. Mary to open St. Clare's Hospital. It is today SSM Health St. Clare Hospital - Baraboo.

=== 1946 to 2003 ===
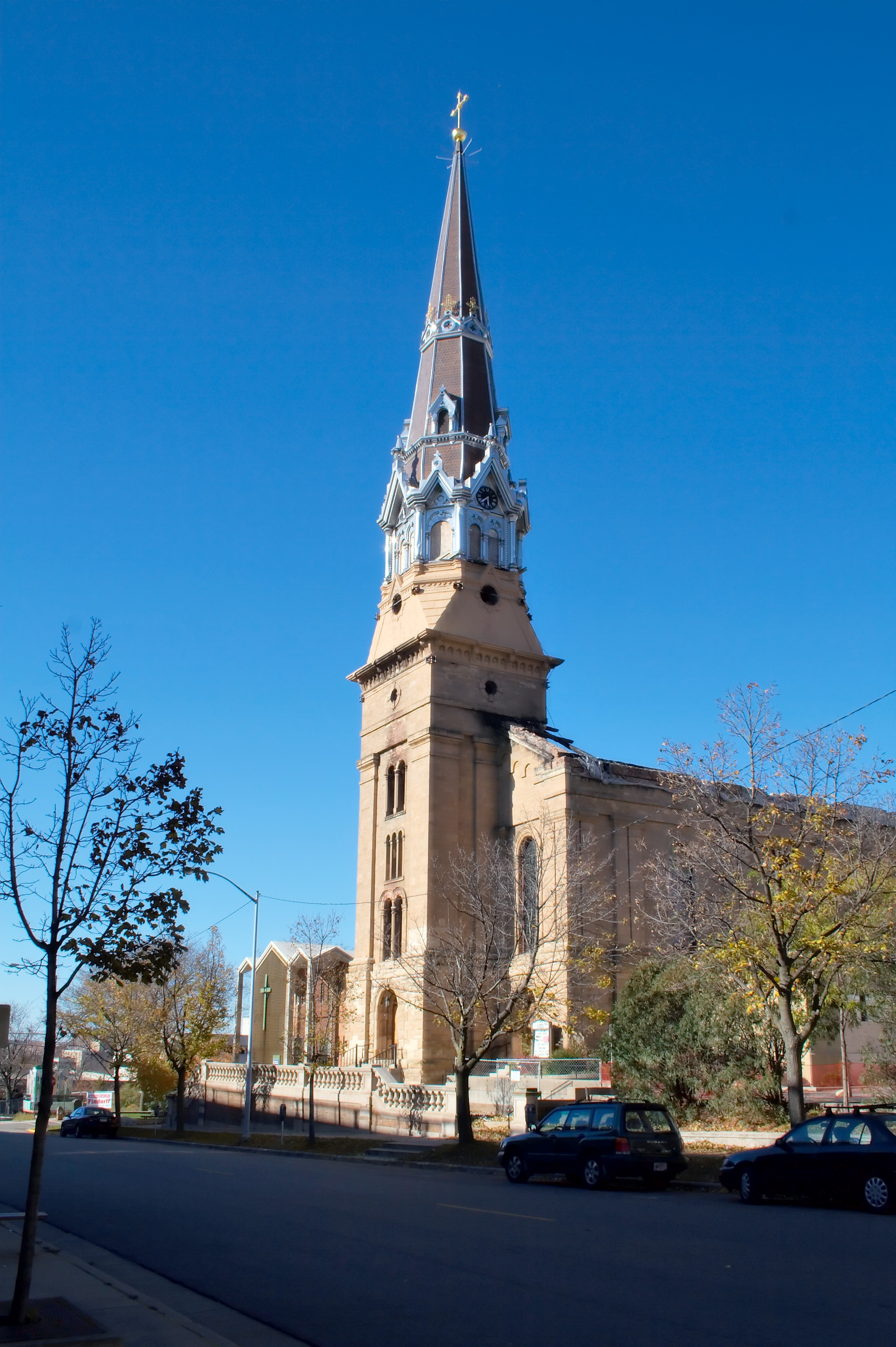
St. Raphael's Cathedral, Madison, Wisconsin, after the 2005 fire

The Diocese of Madison was established on January 9, 1946, by Pope Pius XII. It was created out of territory from the Archdiocese of Milwaukee and the Dioceses of La Crosse and Green Bay. The pope selected Bishop William O'Connor from the Diocese of Superior as the first bishop of Madison.

During O'Connor's tenure, the diocese grew from 135 priests serving 82,000 Catholics to 290 priests serving 180,640 Catholics. In his first year as bishop, O'Connor established the Blessed Martin Guild to promote racial understanding and convert more minorities to Catholicism. He also founded Holy Name Seminary in Madison in 1965. O'Connor resigned as bishop of Madison in 1967.

In 1967, Pope Paul VI appointed Auxiliary Bishop Cletus F. O'Donnell from the Archdiocese of Chicago as the second bishop of Madison. He established ministries for the deaf and the developmentally disabled. He also encouraged adult education and created a religious education consultants program to help individual parishes.

After O'Donnell retired in 1992, Pope John Paul II named Bishop William Bullock of the Diocese of Des Moines to replace him. The pope declared Mazzuchelli, a pioneer priest in the region from the 19th century, as venerable in 1993. In 1995, Bullock closed Holy Name Seminary. He retired as bishop of Madison in 2003.

=== 2003 to present ===
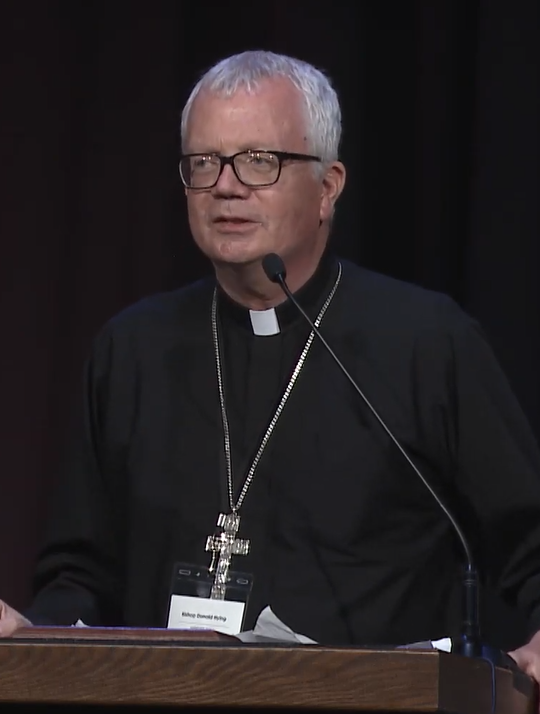
Bishop Hying (2022)

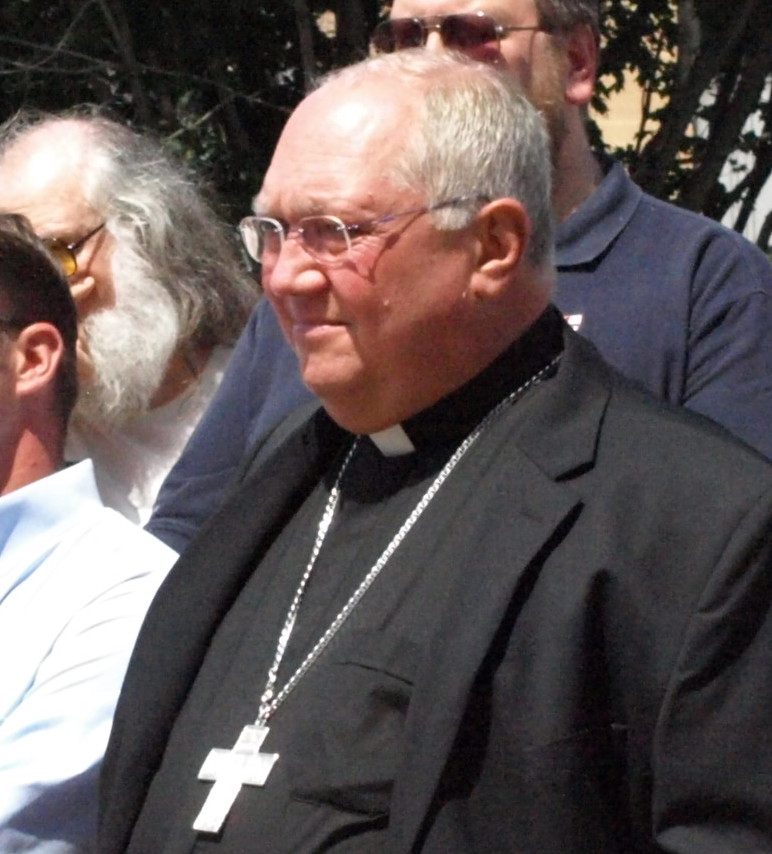
Bishop Morlino (2010)

Bishop Robert C. Morlino from the Diocese of Helena was named the fourth bishop of the Diocese of Madison in 2003. Morlino celebrated the Tridentine Mass in several parishes. He ordered all the parishes to move the tabernacles in their churches to central places of prominence. Morlino encouraged parishioners to receive communion on the tongue while kneeling, and he encouraged pastors to enlist exclusively male altar servers.

Morlino helped raise $44 million for the endowment fund "Priests for Our Future". The number of seminarians grew from six to thirty during his episcopate, one of the largest increases in the United States. Catholics in his diocese had divided opinions of him.

In March 2005, St. Raphael's Cathedral was heavily damaged in an arson attack. William J. Connell was arrested and charged with arson and other crimes, but was deemed incompetent to stand trial due to paranoid schizophrenia. After later being deemed competent, he was tried and convicted. In June 2007, Connell was sentenced to 15 years in prison followed by 15 years of close supervision. In April 2007, Morlino released plans to erect a new cathedral on the existing site. However, the plans were never realized.

In May 2009, Morlino announced that due to budget cuts, he was closing the Catholic Multicultural Center in Madison, which provided food and other support for residents on Madison's south side. A handoff to local parish administration and fundraising drive was announced one week later.

In March 2009, Morlino dismissed Ruth Kolpack from her post as a pastoral associate at St. Thomas the Apostle Parish in Beloit, citing her alleged breaches of orthodoxy. In a brief meeting with Kolpack, he asked her to take an oath of loyalty to the church. Morlino also demanded that she renounce her 2003 doctoral thesis, which advocated women's ordination in the Catholic Church and the use of inclusive language relating to God. Morlino fired Kolpack after she refused this last demand. Morlino died in 2018.

Pope Francis named Bishop Donald J. Hying of the Diocese of Gary as the next bishop of Madison in 2018. In March 2023, Hying announced that he had petitioned the Vatican to designate St. Bernard Catholic Church in Madison as the new cathedral, and Pope Francis elevated the church the same year. In April 2023, Hying announced the grouping of all the parishes into 30 pastorates to be run by multiple priests.

=== Sexual abuse ===
In September 2003, at a legislative hearing in Madison, a woman from Sun Prairie accused Gerald Vosen, pastor of St. Joseph's Parish in Baraboo, of sexually assaulting her brother when he was age 14 in the 1970s. Vosen, who denied the accusations, was put on leave by the diocese. The diocesan review board reviewed three allegations against Vosen and in February 2003 recommended the permanent suspension of his ministry. In May 2004, Vosen unsuccessfully sued one of his accusers.

In June 2019, the diocese agreed to publish a list of credibly accused clergy. In March 2020, Bishop Hying announced that they had found two credible sexual abuse allegations against Patrick Doherty, a retired priest. Hying had previously placed restrictions on Doherty.

In August 2025, Madison-based priest Andrew T. Showers was indicted on attempted use of a computer to facilitate a child sex crime, attempted child enticement-exposing intimate parts, and attempted second-degree sexual assault of a child. He had been arrested in Clintonville while trying to meet with someone he presumed was a 14-year-old, but was actually an undercover police officer. In March 2026, Showers was also charged on two counts of child pornography possession On May 4, 2026, Showers pled not guilty to the child pornography possession charges.

== Bishops ==
=== Bishops of Madison ===
1. William Patrick O'Connor (1946 – 1967), his resignation.
2. Cletus F. O'Donnell (1967 – 1992), his resignation.
3. William H. Bullock (1993–2003), his resignation.
4. Robert C. Morlino (2003 – 2018), his death.
5. Donald J. Hying (2019–present).

=== Auxiliary bishops ===
- Jerome J. Hastrich (1963 – 1969), appointed Bishop of Gallup (1969–1990).
- George Otto Wirz (1977 – 2004), his resignation.

=== Diocesan priest who became bishop ===
Paul J. Swain, appointed Bishop of Sioux Falls (2006–2019).

== Schools ==
As of 2026, the Diocese of Madison has 34 elementary schools, one diocesan online high school, four independent high schools, and two independent elementary schools.

=== High schools ===
- Chesterton Academy - Queen of Martyrs – Sun Prairie
- Edgewood High School of the Sacred Heart – Madison
- Shoreless Lake School – Sauk City
- St. Ambrose Academy – Madison
- St. Carlos Acutis Academy – diocesan online high school

== Arms ==
Coat of arms of Diocese of Madison
Notes Arms were designed and adopted when the diocese was erected Adopted 1946 Escutcheon The arms of the diocese are composed of a field that is wavy bars of silver (white) and blue on which a red cross with a fish is present Symbolism The arms of the diocese are composed of a field that is wavy bars of silver (white) and blue. This is the traditional heraldic representation for water and the field of "water" is divided by a red cross into four sections to remind us of the lakes of the region around Madison. On the red cross is a fish and this conjunction of symbols is a classic symbolic representation for Saint Raphael, the titular of the Cathedral Church of Madison. Raphael means "healer of God" and his ministrations to men make interesting reading in the Book of Tobit in the Old Testament. The fish recalls the episode where Raphael ordered Tobias to cook a fish to eat but removed the heart, liver and gall for future medicinal use. Later the liver was used by Tobias to drive out the devil, who had slain seven of the previous husbands of Sara, his wife, while the gall was used to restore sight to his blind father.
