= Sunset Hills Historic District (Madison, Wisconsin) =

- U.S. National Register of Historic Places
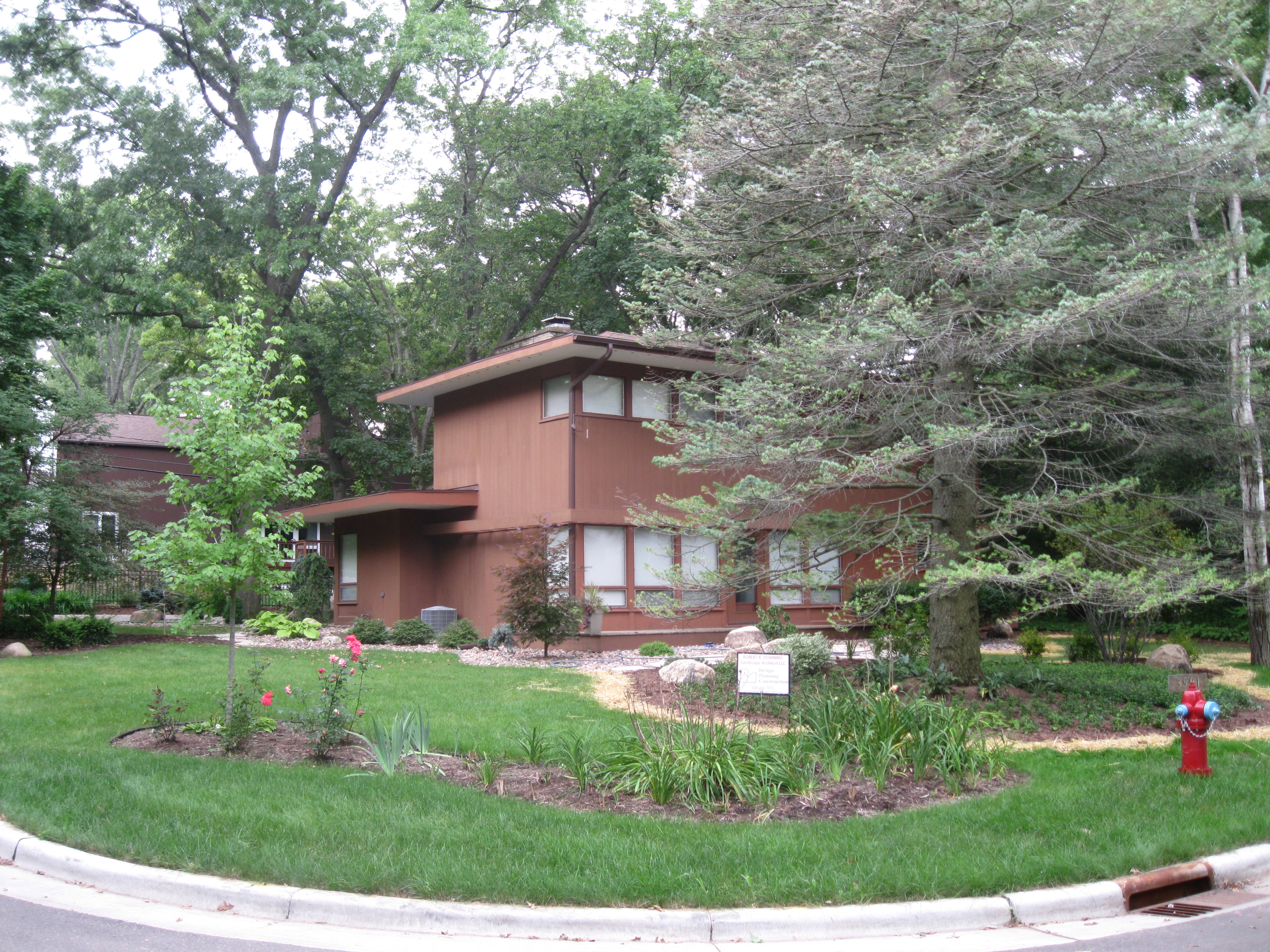
- House at 3901 Plymouth Circle

- Location within Wisconsin
- Location: Bounded by Owen Pkwy., Regent & Larkin Sts., Hillcrest Dr., Madison, Wisconsin
- Coordinates: 43°03′54″N 89°26′41″W
- NRHP reference No.: 15000356
- Added to NRHP: June 15, 2015

The Sunset Hills Historic District is a residential historic district encompassing the Sunset Hills subdivision on the near west side of Madison, Wisconsin. The district includes 93 houses developed between 1955 and 1978, all designed by professional architects in the Modern style. Developer Willis E. Gifford, who also developed the Pilgrim Village subdivision in 1939, planned Sunset Hills; the idea for a single-family neighborhood of professionally designed houses came after Pilgrim Village residents rejected his original plan for apartments. Madison was growing rapidly at the time, and the new subdivision catered to affluent professionals who came to the city for work, including many professors and administrators at the University of Wisconsin. The district includes several designs by Herb Fritz Jr., a Madison architect who worked under Frank Lloyd Wright at Taliesin, and William V. Kaeser, who worked for Frank M. Riley and was heavily influenced by Wright. It also has three houses designed by Elizabeth Mackay Ranney, the only practicing female architect in Madison in the 1960s.

The district was added to the National Register of Historic Places on June 15, 2015.

== History ==
James Doty's original plat of Madison in 1836 focused on the area around the capitol, and that is where most of the city's early construction occurred. The west side remained mostly farmland for some years, traversed by Sauk Road and Mineral Point Road. But in 1857 Forest Hill Cemetery was started and in 1863 Calvary Cemetery. These cemeteries lie a bit east of the future Sunset Hills district. In 1892 Professor Edward Owen began privately developing the scenic prominence that would become Hoyt Park, just north and west of the district.

Meanwhile, the city's population was growing to the west, adding the Wingra Park plat in 1889 and University Heights in 1893. The city's streetcar reached the cemeteries in 1897, stimulating growth of the subdivisions already mentioned. That growth was further spurred in 1903 when the city annexed those subdivisions, guaranteeing city sewers, schools, and other services. These were followed by more subdivisions before WWI: Mercer's Park, Highland Park, College Park, College Hills, Nakoma, University Park, and West Wingra in 1916. Then not much happened until 1925 when Findlay Park was platted; Westmorland Subdivision followed in 1926. The Great Depression slowed development for years. Then Pilgrim Village was platted in 1939, just south of the future Sunset Hills.

Pilgrim Village was developed by Willis E. Gifford Jr. In that subdivision, he and his design review committee mandated that all houses be designed in Colonial Revival style, which was popular at the time and approved by the Federal Housing Administration. In 1941 Gifford, backed by the First Wisconsin Trust Company, went ahead with developing Sunset Hills subdivision, just to the north.

Sunset Hills was platted by A.E. Ziegenhagen of Milwaukee - laid out with curvilinear streets and a cul-de-sac like Pilgrim Village - features favored by the FHA at that time. Development paused during WWII, but resumed in 1946. In constrast to the Colonial Revival requirement of Pilgrim Village, by 1953 Sunset Hills was being promoted as "Highly restricted for Residences of Contemporary and Modern Architecture," and John Randal McDonald was listed as design supervisor. Construction of the first houses began in 1954 and by 1958 twenty-six were complete. The 1950s were a boom time for Madison, with expansion of the UW, addition of the new VA hospital, the relocation of Credit Union National Association, and the office buildings near Hilldale Shopping Center. The requirement that homes in Sunset Hills be architect-designed meant that many of the owners were UW professors and administrators, doctors, dentists, and other professionals and executives. By 1978 the subdivision was nearly full, with only three houses unoccupied.

All houses in the district were required to be modern styles. Here are some good examples of different types.

- The Torgeson house at 4006 Hillcrest Drive is a raised ranch house built in 1955. This style has all living quarters on one level, with a garage in the basement level. Oscar Torgeson was a consultant with the U.S. Forest Products lab.
- The Larson house at 3902 Plymouth Circle is a Contemporary-style house designed by Donald J. Reppen, built in 1957 by Harold Needham, with a flat roof, wood siding, and a windowed loft room. Frank Larson was an associate professor at the UW.
- The Bartell house at 3959 Plymouth Circle is a Contemporary-style house designed by Robert C. Cashin and built in 1957. Gerald Bartell was the president of Bartell Group and McFadden Publications.
- The Howard and Helen Stark house at 3994 Plymouth Circle is a ranch-style house designed by William V. Kaeser and built in 1959 by Robert Shaw. Stark was the president of a collection agency.
- The Dr. Golden house at 3921 Plymouth Circle is a split-level house built in 1960. This floorplan generally placed a garage and family room in the lower level, quiet living areas in the mid level, and bedrooms above. Farrell Golden was a physician at the Dean Clinic.
- The Liebl house at 3938 Plymouth Circle is a Contemporary-style house designed by Jack W. Klund and built in 1960. Dr. Edmund Liebl was a physician and surgeon.
- The Weinstein house at 105 Standish Court is a Contemporary-style house designed by William V. Kaeser and built in 1961. Dr. Arvin Weinstein was a physician at the UW hospital.
- The Levy house at 3941 Plymouth Circle is a brick-clad Contemporary-style house designed by Robert A. Rosenthal and built in 1962. Irving Levy was the president of Phillips & Sons, wholesale liquor.
- The Cassida house at 3918 Plymouth Circle is a Contemporary or Usonian-style house designed by Herbert Fritz Jr. and built in 1962. Dr. John Cassida was a professor at the UW.
- The Ranney house at 3930 Plymouth Circle is a Contemporary-style house that Elizabeth MacKay Ranney designed for her own family, built in 1964. Elizabeth was the only registered female architect in Madison at the time. Her husband Austin was a professor of political science at the UW.
- The Sunset Hills Corporation House is a Contemporary-style structure built in 1963, which initially served as an office of the developer's company. In 1974, when the subdivision was filling in, William E. Gifford converted it to a home and lived there.
- The Camerini house at 3925 Plymouth Circle is a Wrightian/Usonian design built in 1964 by the Hoyt Park Construction Company - a split-level house with a flat roof, banded windows, and horizontal lines, built around a prominent chimney. Ugo Camerini was a professor at the UW.
- The Nadler house at 3926 Priscilla Lane is a Contemporary-style house designed by Krueger, Kraft & Associates and built in 1964. Dr. Gerald Nadler was a professor at the UW.
- The Berman house at 3901 Priscilla Lane is a Contemporary-style house designed by Herbert N. DeLevie and built in 1967, clad in horizontal board and batten. Robert Berman was vice-president of a wholesale tobacco company.
- The Cain house at 3905 Regent Street is a Contemporary-style house designed by Edward A. Solner and built in 1968. Dr. Glen Cain was a professor of economics at the UW.
- The Pierstoff house at 113 Alden Drive is a Contemporary-style house designed by Joseph J. Weiler and built in 1970. Dr. Lola Pierstoff was an assistant professor at the UW.
- The Checota house at 3933 Regent Street is a Contemporary-style house designed by Jon Westerlund and built in 1971. Joe Checota was the president of the American Medical Building Guild.

All houses in the subdivision were required to be designed by architects. The NRHP nomination describes them as "the finest collection of Modern Movement single family residences dating from this period to be found in the city of Madison."
