= College Hills Historic District =

Historic district in Wisconsin, United States

- U.S. National Register of Historic Places
- U.S. Historic district
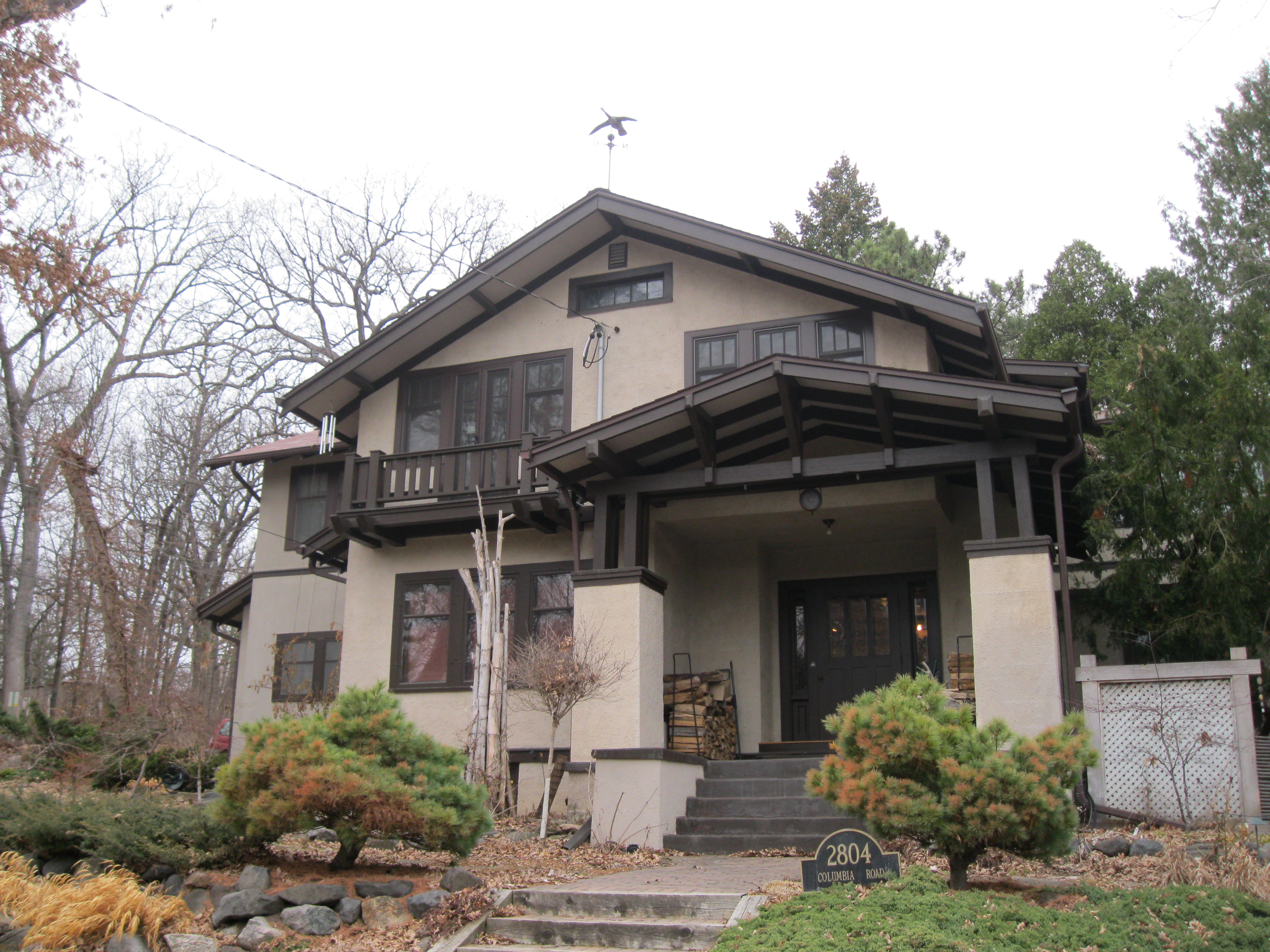
- 2804 Columbia Road

- Location within Wisconsin Location within the United States
- Location: Roughly bounded by Colombia Rd., Amherst Dr., Bowdoin Rd., Corporate Limit, University Bay, and Harvard Dr., Shorewood Hills, Wisconsin
- Area: 67 acres (27 ha)
- Architect: Purcell and Elmslie, Beatty and Strang
- Architectural style: Prairie School, International Style, Period Revival
- NRHP reference No.: 02001518
- Added to NRHP: December 9, 2002

The College Hills Historic District is a 67-acre (27 ha) residential historic district in Shorewood Hills, Wisconsin that was listed on the National Register of Historic Places in 2002. It includes architect-designed homes by Purcell and Elmslie and other architects among its 114 contributing buildings. Among them is the Prof. Philip M. and Marian Raup House.

Development of the neighborhood began in 1913 when John C. McKenna bought an extent of farmland with views of Lake Mendota and the UW campus and platted it into lots. He advertised his subdivision as "A Neighborhood of High Class Homes," hoping to appeal to the expanding university population. He named the development "College Hills" and named the streets after colleges. The first homes were built starting in 1914, in then-popular styles Prairie School and Craftsman. As styles shifted, later homes were built in various period revival styles.

Non-Madison architects whose work is represented in the district include:

- Purcell and Elmslie, who designed the Prof. Harold C. & Josephine Bradley House, at 2914 Oxford Rd.
- Ossian Cole Simonds.
- J.C. "Cary" Caraway, who designed the Ruedisili home at 2909 Hunter Hill. Caraway was a Taliesin fellow.

Madison architects whose works are included in the district include:

- Beatty & Strang
- Henry T. Dysland
- John J. Flad
- Frank S. Moulton
- Herbert Fritz, Jr.
- Philip M. Homer
- William V. Kaeser
- Law, Law & Potter
- Livermore & Samuelson
- Charles E. Marks (b. 1875) "one of the Madison area's best builder-architects"
- Frank M. Riley.

Eight photos are included

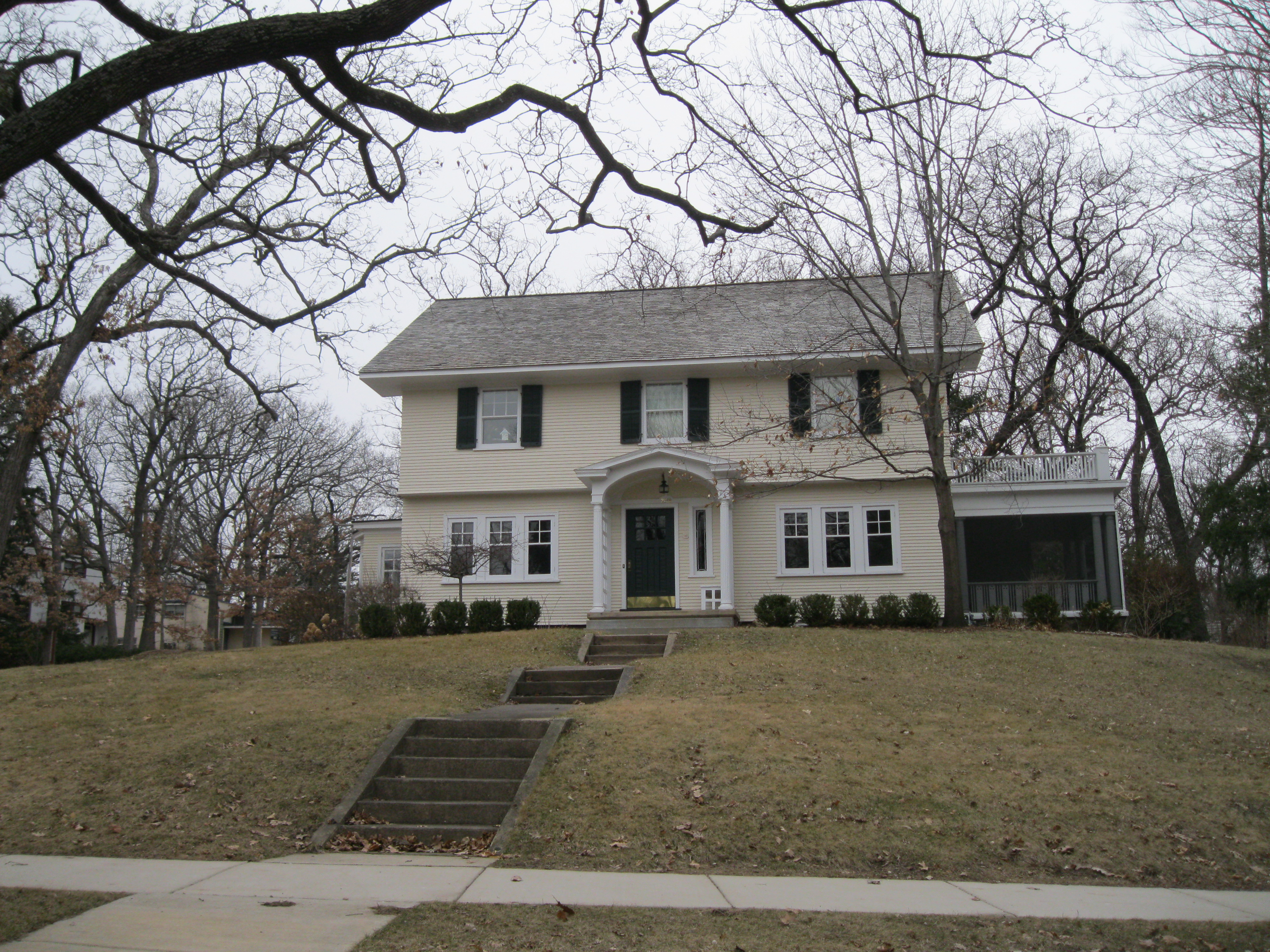
2816 Columbia Road

- Photo 1, 2816 Columbia Rd., View looking NW

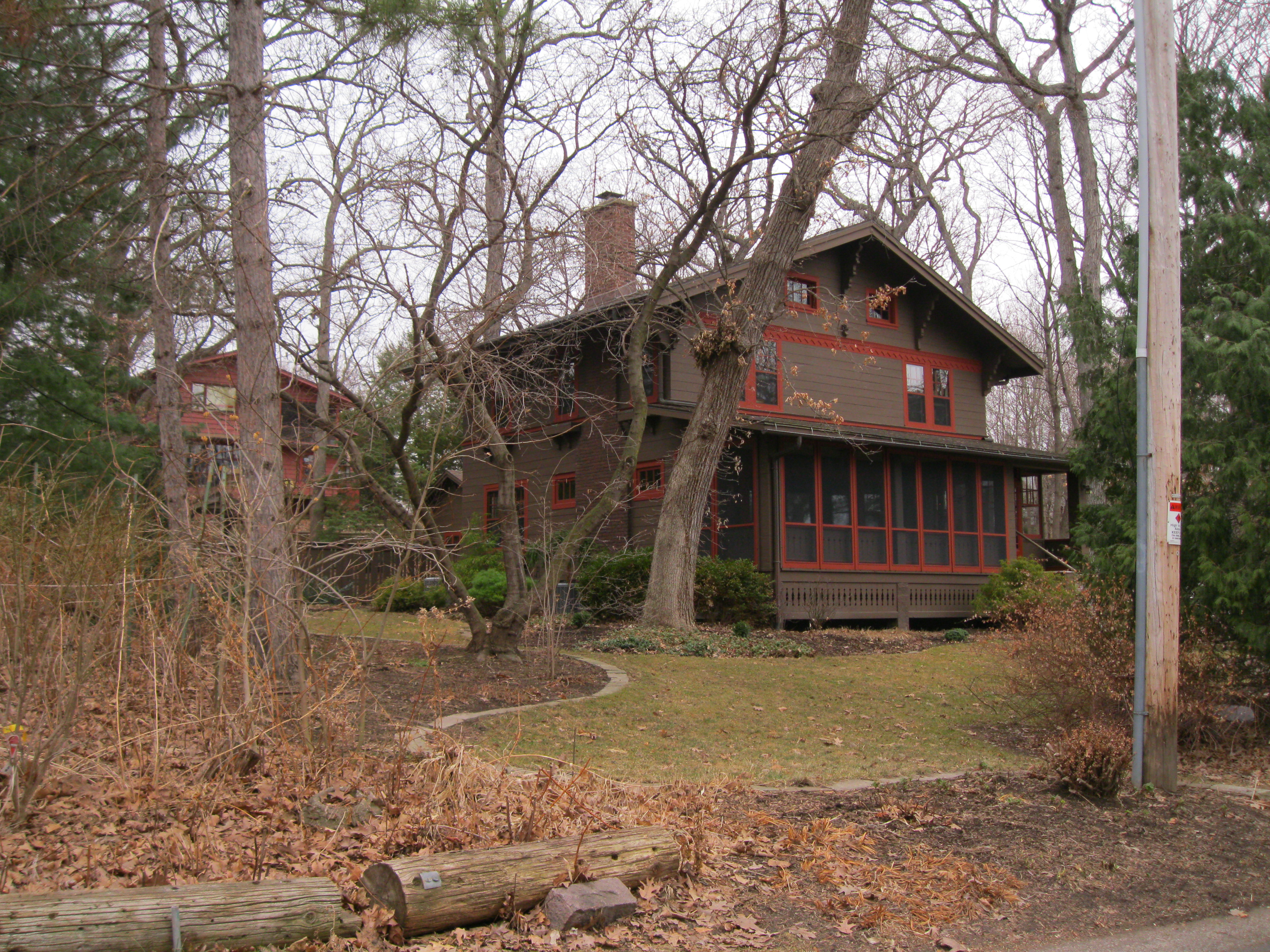
1218 Sweetbriar Road

- Photo 2, 1218 Sweetbriar Rd., View looking W. John C. McKenna designed Sweetbriar Road one in first photo
- Photo 3, 1102 Dartmouth Rd., View looking WSW. House built in 1916 and designed by Charles E. Marks
- Photo 4, 2914 Oxford Rd., View looking N
- photo 5, 2919 Oxford Rd., View looking SE
- Photo 6, 1214 Dartmouth Rd., View looking WSW
- Photo 7, 1240 Sweetbriar Rd., View looking W
- Photo 8, 1206 Dartmouth Rd., View looking
