= Charles Marks =

Charles Marks may refer to:

- Charles Ferdinand Marks, physician and politician in Queensland, Australia
- Charles E. Marks (1875–?), carpenter and general contractor in Madison, Wisconsin
- Charles Hardaway Marks (1921–2004), American attorney and politician
- Charlie Dale (Charles Marks, 1885–1971), member of the American vaudeville comedy duo Smith & Dale
