= Prof. Philip M. and Marian Raup House =

The Prof. Philip M. and Marian Raup House is located at 2908 Oxford Road, in Shorewood Hills, Wisconsin, United States. It was designed by Herbert Fritz Jr. in 1952.

The house was added to the State and the National Register of Historic Places in 2002. It is located within the College Hills Historic District.

Professor Raup (1914–2011) was an expert on the effects of world agricultural policies on economic development. He joined the University of Wisconsin–Madison as assistant professor of agricultural economics in 1949. From 1953 to 1984, he was professor of agricultural economics at the University of Minnesota.
