= Old Spring Tavern =

- U.S. National Register of Historic Places
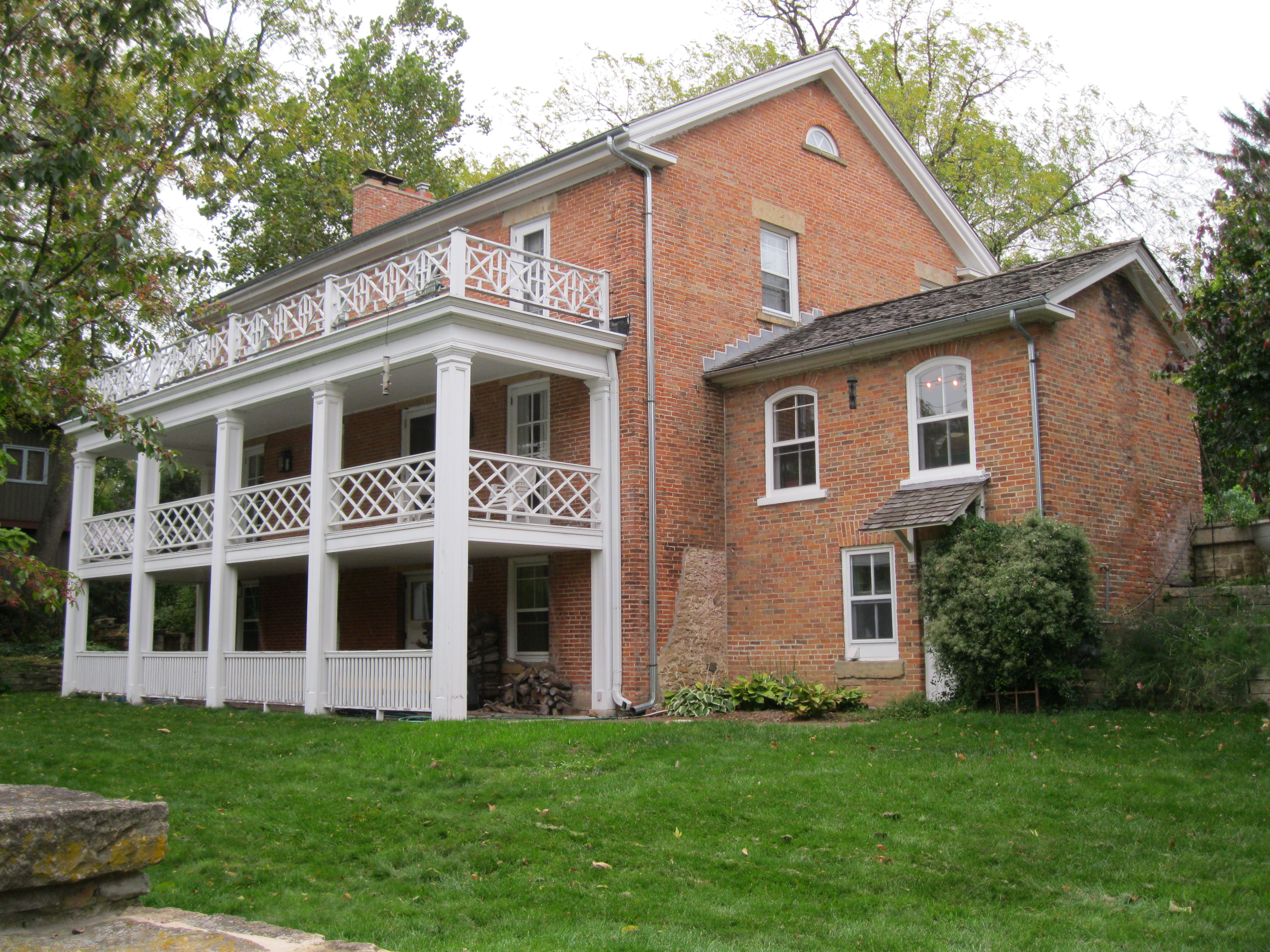
- Old Spring Tavern
- Location: 3706 Nakoma Rd. Madison, Wisconsin
- Coordinates: 43.05004°N 89.43746°W
- Built: 1854
- Architectural style: Greek Revival
- NRHP reference No.: 74000077
- Added to NRHP: January 21, 1974

The Old Spring Tavern was built as a stopping place in 1854 on the Madison-Monroe stagecoach road. The city of Madison, Wisconsin has grown around the old Greek Revival-styled building and in 1974 it was added to the National Register of Historic Places.

== History ==
In 1854 Connecticut native Charles Morgan built an inn west of what was then Madison on the stagecoach road heading for the lead-mining region in southwest Wisconsin. He picked the spot partly for the large spring nearby which could be used to water horses and oxen. (That spring now feeds the duck pond.) In those days the stage road ran on the other side of the house - not where Nakoma Road now runs.

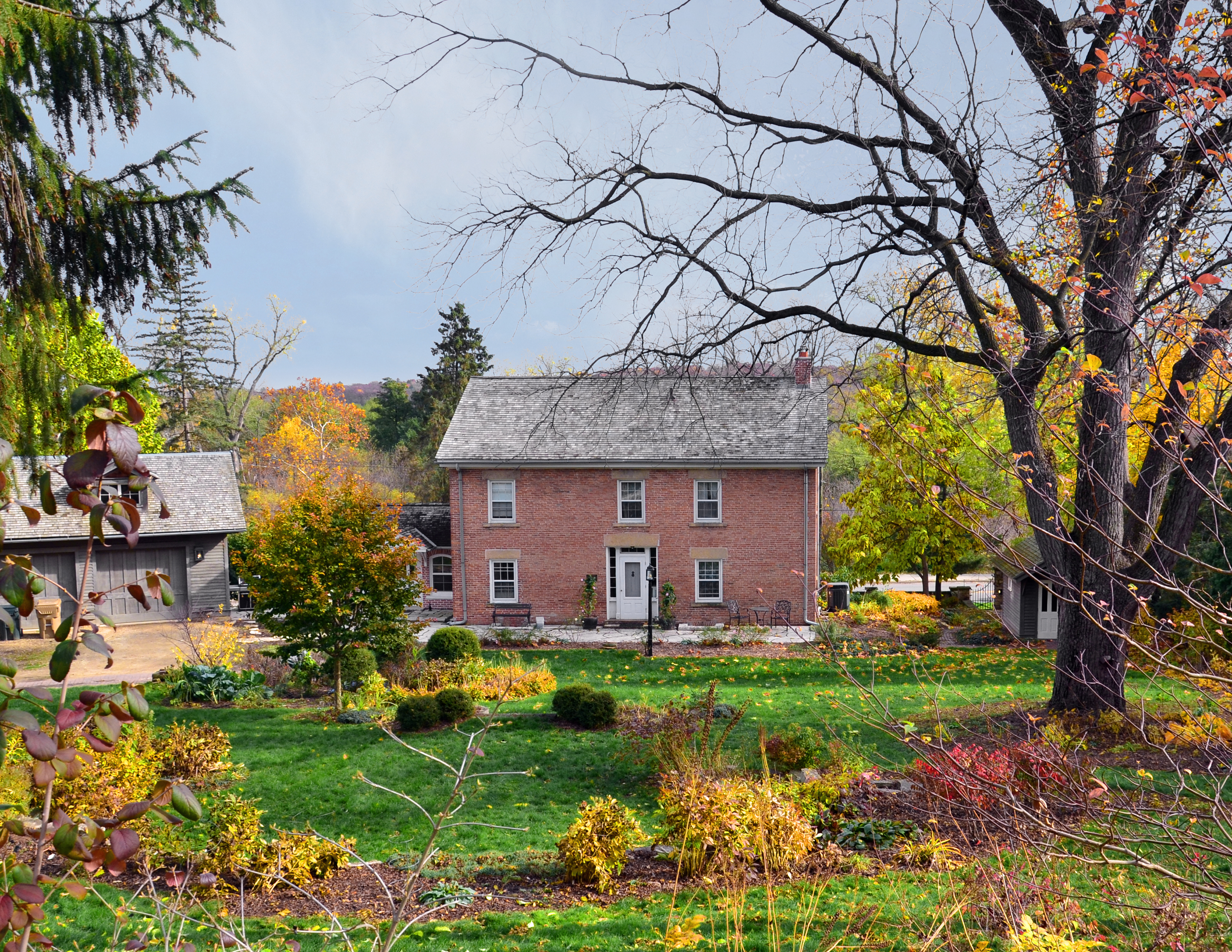
This 2011 view from behind gives a better idea of the original appearance than the front with its porch.

Morgan used clay from a nearby slope to make reddish bricks. He built the house two stories tall, with brick walls twenty-two inches thick at the base and narrower above. The style includes some of the Greek Revival elements that were popular at the time: the cornice returns, the unadorned window sills and lintels, and the sidelights and transom around the main entry. A chimney rose from each end. The house was heated by Franklin stoves. A summer kitchen stood at the northeast side of the house. The front porch was not part of the original design.

In 1860, Morgan sold the tavern and 60 acres to James W. Gorham for $9000 gold. Gorham ran the in for a bit, then joined the Union Army, leasing the inn. When he returned from the war, he resumed running it as Gorham's Hotel until 1895. At that point he closed the hotel and used it as his private home.

In 1925 Professor James G. Dickson bought the house from the Gorham family. Dickson remodeled the house, adding the Chippendale porch on the front of the house and the stone wall along Nakoma Road. Mrs. Dickson claimed that the wall was designed by Frank Lloyd Wright. Inside, Dickson replaced the Franklin stoves with two fireplaces.

Over the years the country inn has been encircled by the city of Madison. In 1972 the house was named a landmark by city's Landmarks Commission. In the same year it was added to the NRHP, significant for both its history and its Greek Revival architecture, which is rather rare in Madison. In 1998 the surrounding neighborhood was designated the Nakoma Historic District, and the Old Spring Tavern is the oldest structure in that district.

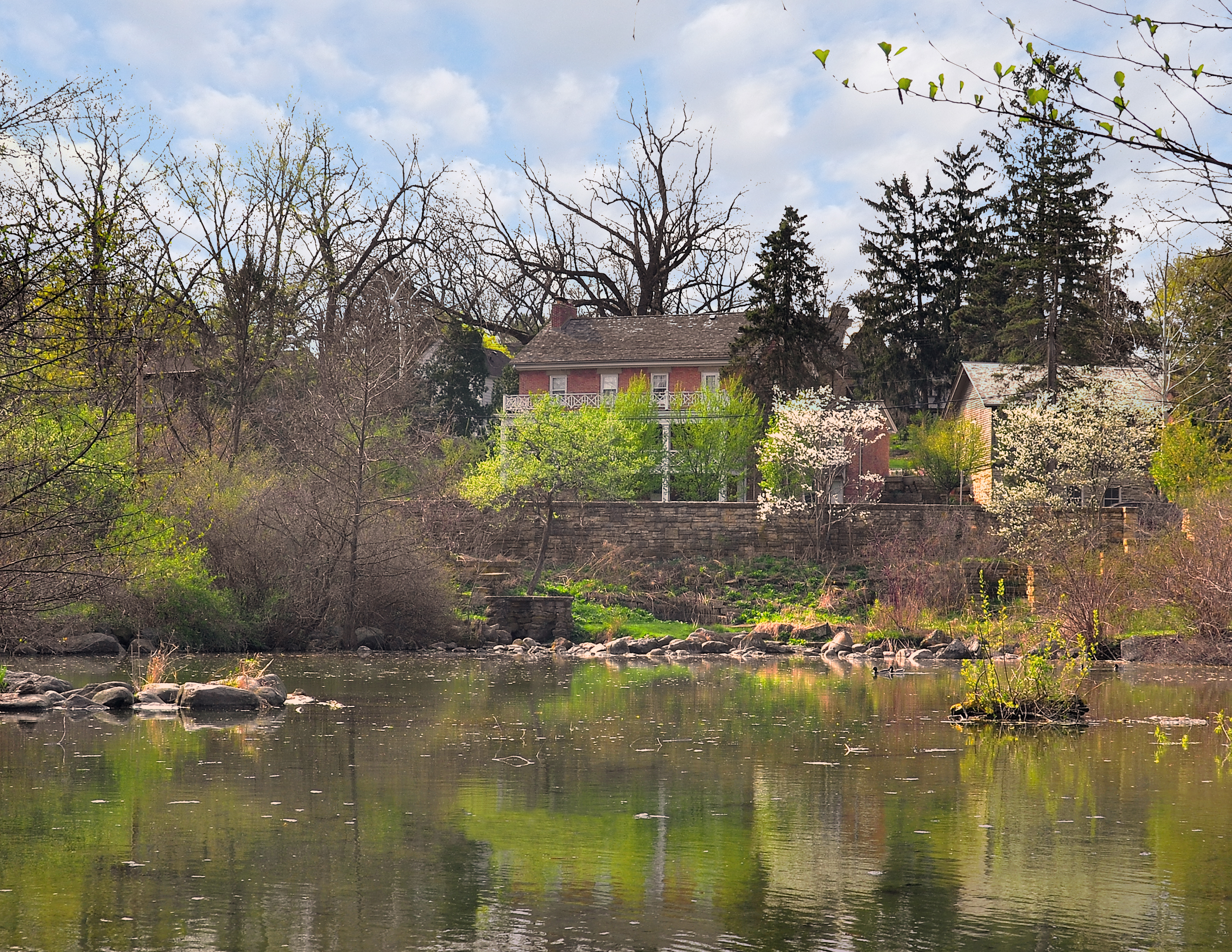
A view across the duck pond
