= Nakoma Historic District =

Historic district in Wisconsin, United States

- U.S. National Register of Historic Places
- U.S. Historic district
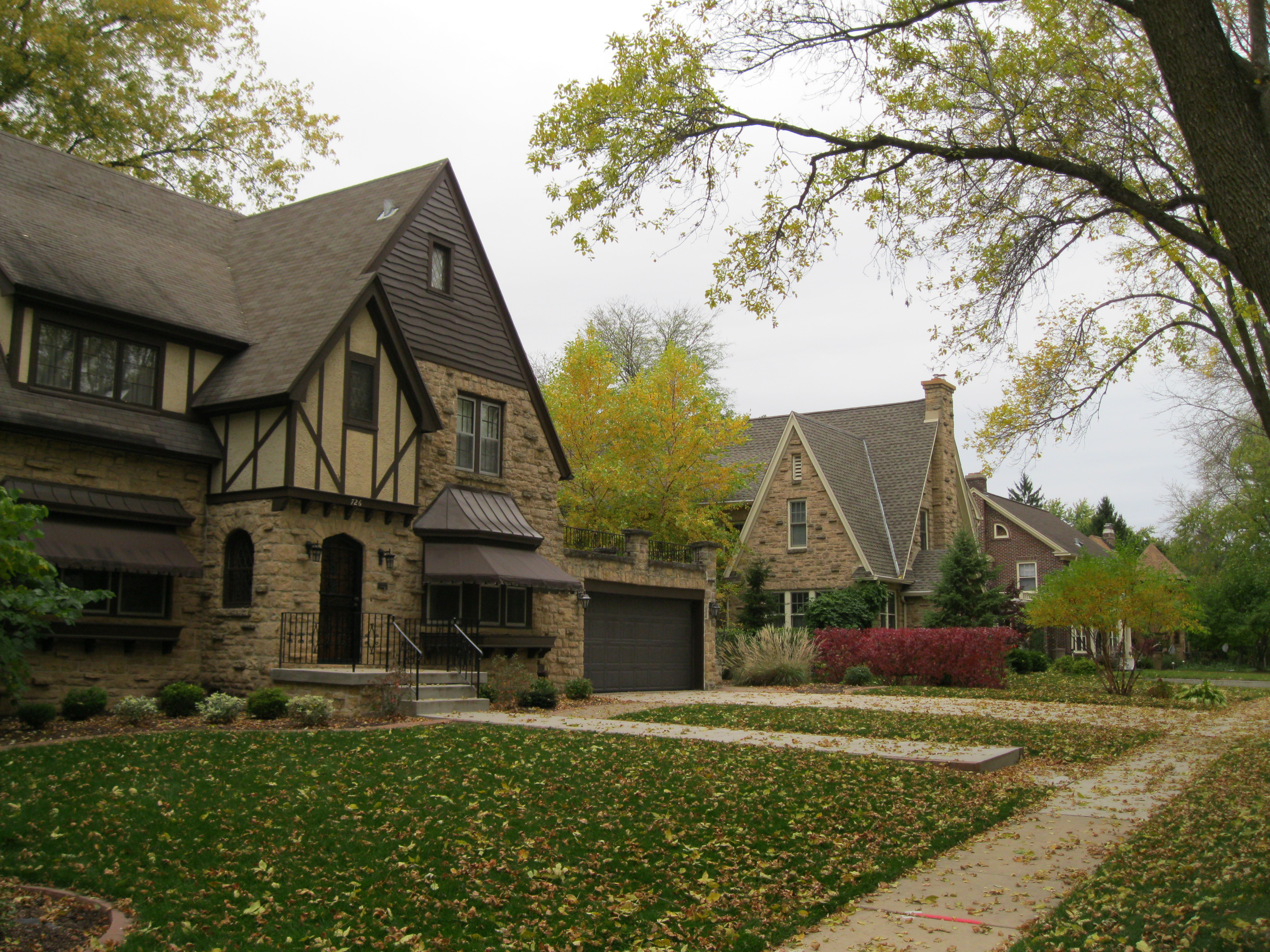

- Location within Wisconsin Location within the United States
- Location: Roughly bounded by Odana Rd., Manitou Wy., Mohawk Dr., and Whenona Dr., Madison, Wisconsin
- Coordinates: 43°2′36″N 89°26′38″W
- Area: 226 acres (91 ha)
- NRHP reference No.: 98000168
- Added to NRHP: February 26, 1998

The Nakoma Historic District is a historic neighborhood on the southwest side of Madison, Wisconsin near the Nakoma Country Club, including contributing houses built from 1915 to 1946. In 1998 the large district was added to the National Register of Historic Places, primarily for having "the finest collection of Period Revival style buildings" in Madison.

== History ==
Native Americans long lived around the four lakes region, including near Lake Wingra just east of this district. The settlement of Madison began in the 1830s with the early town taking shape on the isthmus around the capitol. Two miles to the southwest, the land that would eventually become the Nakoma district developed into farms in those early years.

By 1854 the Madison-Monroe road led through these farms, heading toward Wisconsin's lead-mining region. Charles Morgan and James Gorham built a stagecoach stop there now called the Old Spring Tavern. Two years later, in 1856, a rural school was built where the Thoreau School now stands. The area remained more or less rural like this until the 1910s.

By this time the city was growing this way, with University Heights, Wingra Park, and other subdivisions. Some of these were served by streetcar lines which transported workers to the downtown each day. In 1914 and 1915 the Madison Realty Company bought farmlands along Verona Road and began plans to develop them into the subdivision that would be Nakoma.

Chicago landscape gardener Ossian Cole Simonds and Leonard S. Smith laid out the general plan for the subdivision. It was later described by one of its promoters like this:

The rolling landscape facing south and east, with an unobstructed view of Lake Wingra, the Capitol, the University, and the city, seemed an ideal location for a large community of homes. Prov. L.S. Smith of the University designed and laid out the plat. The lots are large and the streets are broad and inviting as they follow the sweeping curves at the base of the hills. The general result was to leave the land as nature made it, unmarred by the cutting through of streets, so common in the conventional city plat.

Some buyers needed convincing to move out of the city, and Madison Realty met that challenge. Automobiles were becoming more common, but not everyone had them. Instead of an expensive streetcar line, the developer provided a private bus service to help people commute into the city. The developer provided water, gas, electricity and sidewalks. Property taxes were promoted as lower than in the city. The suburb was promoted as family friendly, prohibiting saloons, and replacing the old grade school with a new Prairie School-styled building. The developer even paid for a neighborhood magazine called the Nakoma Tomahawk. "Nakoma" was said to be a Chippewa word meaning "I do as I promise."

Growth was slow during WWI, with only twenty-three new buildings in the subdivision by 1920, but then things took off. At that time Madison Reality hired Paul E. Stark as sales manager. In the same year, the Nakoma Homes Company was formed - basically a homeowner association which new residents had to join. The Homes Company agreed to maintain the streets, keep vacant lots clean, and provide fire protection and police. The residents signed a covenant which specified setbacks of houses on the lots, prohibited businesses, prohibited multi-family homes, and required approval of exterior building plans by an architect who was approved by the Homes Company. The aim was to assure residents that their outside-the-city neighborhood would remain a desirable place for them to live.

The Nakoma Country Club was established just to the east in 1921. "Country club suburbs" was a trend at the time and College Hills and Maple Bluff already had their own country clubs.

Construction in Nakoma continued through the 1920s, but stopped in 1931 as the country sank into the Great Depression. Growth resumed in 1934. Additions were platted, and by 1945 most of the lots in what is now the Nakoma Historic District were occupied. Eventually the subdivision was annexed by the city of Madison.

== Architecture styles in the district ==
The styles of homes in the district followed the same general sequence as in other parts of the U.S. Each style eventually came to be considered old-fashioned and was replaced by newer styles for new builds. There are no Italianate or Queen Anne houses in the district because their heyday was missed; no surviving houses were built between 1854 (the Old Spring Tavern) and the founding of the Nakoma subdivision in 1915. At that point, the then-modern Craftsman and Prairie School styles were in fashion, so that's what was built. By the 1920s they were falling out of favor and various Period Revival styles took over, with many Colonial Revival and Tudor Revival flavors in the district. By the 1940s, a few Modern-style homes were built. Following are some good examples of different styles, in roughly the order built.

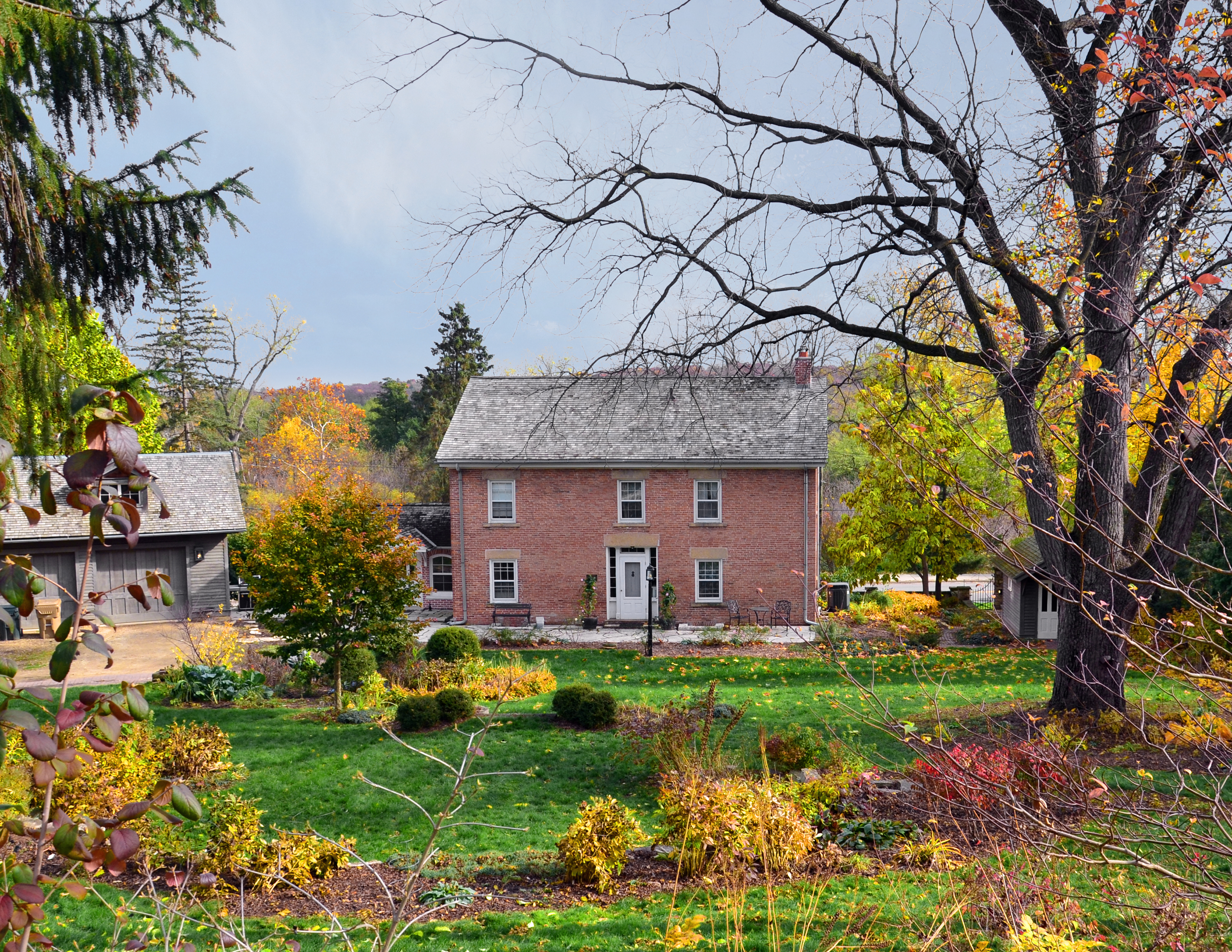
Old Spring Tavern, 1854, Greek Revival style

=== Greek Revival ===
The Old Spring Tavern at 3706 Nakoma Rd is the oldest surviving building in Nakoma. It was built in 1854 by Charles Morgan at a spot along the old Madison-Monroe stage road where an ample spring (now the duck pond) supplied water for horses. It was built with pink bricks made from clay dug nearby. Greek Revival style was popular for new buildings from 1825 to 1860. Hallmarks of the style in this building are the low-pitched roof with cornice returns, the symmetry, and the plain window sills and lintels. James Gorham bought the inn in 1860 and it served that role until 1895, when it was remodeled into a private home. The porch across the front was added in 1925.

=== Prairie School ===
The Anita & Frederick Miner, Jr. house at 1026 Seminole Highway is a small Prairie School house built in 1915. Prairie School style was popular from 1900 to 1920. The style's hallmarks present in this house are the emphasis on the horizontal, the wide eaves, the stucco, and the grouped windows. Frederick was a real estate salesman. Prairie School was an effort to make a new "American" architecture that didn't derive from European styles like Italianate or Queen Anne. Wisconsin son Frank Lloyd Wright was the leading proponent, and there are a number of Prairie School houses in the district.

=== Craftsman ===
The Charles Juckem house at 4202 Mandan Crescent is a Craftsman-style house built in 1917. American Craftsman style was developed by the Greene brothers in California, influenced by the English Arts and Crafts movement and Oriental wooden architecture. It was popular for new buildings from 1905 to 1930. The hallmarks of the style in this house are the exposed rafter tails and the full-width front porch. In this case, the style is applied to a 1.5-story bungalow, which was a common pairing. This particular house is a catalog house built from a kit sold by Sears, Roebuck & Co. - a model called the "Hazelton."

The Clements building at 3821 Nakoma Road is another interesting Craftsman-style building in the district. As mentioned above, Nakoma's developers placed deed restrictions on buyers which forbade businesses in the district, to preserve the residential quality. But they felt one local store was needed, so allowed W.L. Clements in 1915 to build this structure with a grocery store downstairs and Clements' living quarters upstairs. It housed Clements' Nakoma Trading Post until 1931, other grocers until 1979, then an insurance office. The exposed brackets are common in Craftsman style.

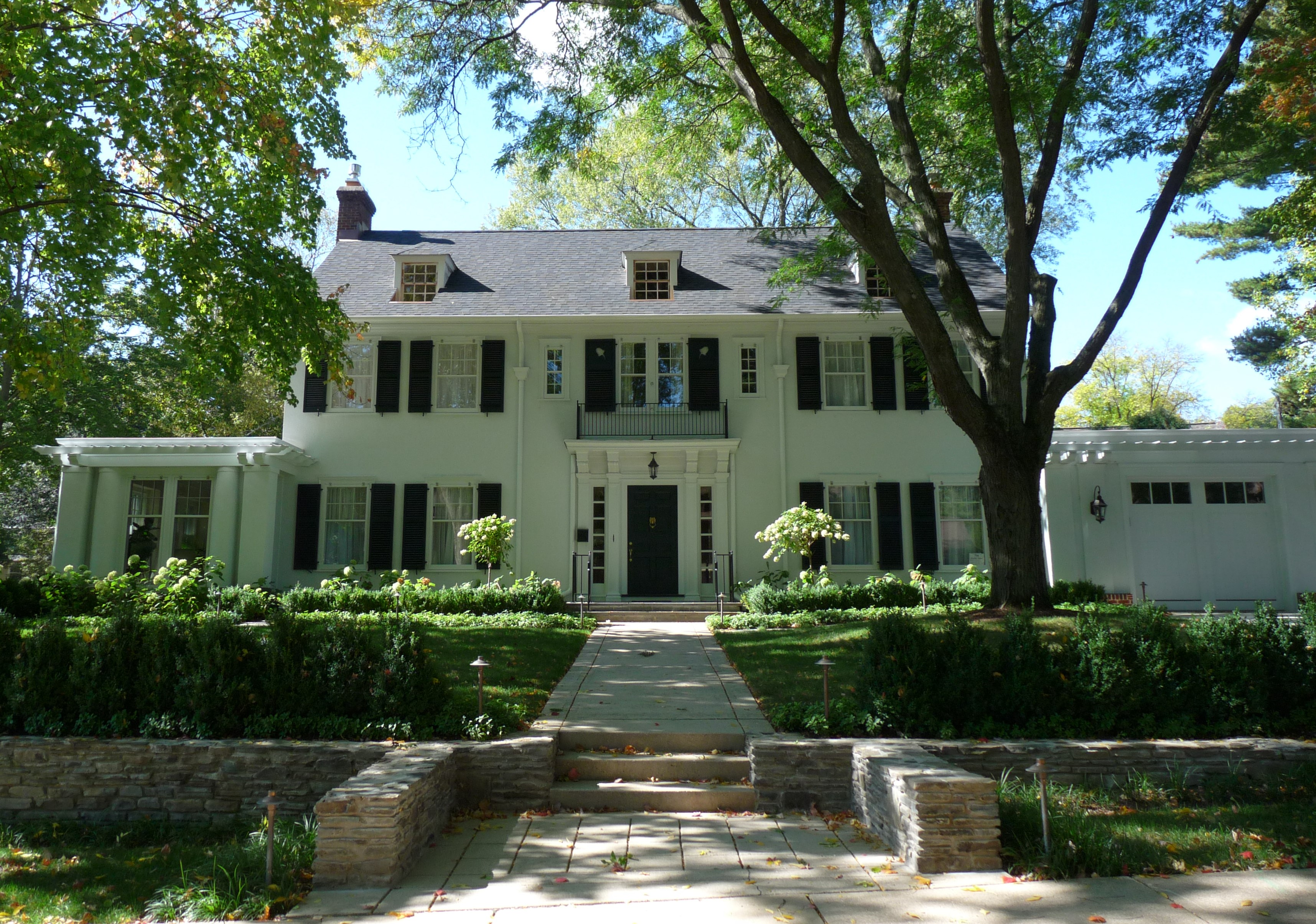
Stark house, 1921, Colonial Revival

=== Colonial Revival ===
The Paul & Julia Stark house at 734 Huron Hill is a 2-story Colonial Revival home built in 1921. After WWI there was a burst of building in the subdivision and Period Revival styles taking over from Prairie School and Craftsman styles. Colonial Revival was a long-popular style that had appeared around 1880, based on early English and Dutch-styled houses from the East Coast. It continued to be popular until 1955. Hallmarks of the style in this house are the symmetric façade, the front door with sidelights and pilasters, and the multi-pane windows. Classical columns are also common, though not usually massive ones like those flanking the sunroom in this house. The stucco exterior is also less common. Paul Stark was the real estate man who promoted Nakoma starting in 1920, when growth in the subdivision began to boom. Of the 500 contributing buildings in the district, 321 are Colonial Revival style.

=== Tudor Revival ===
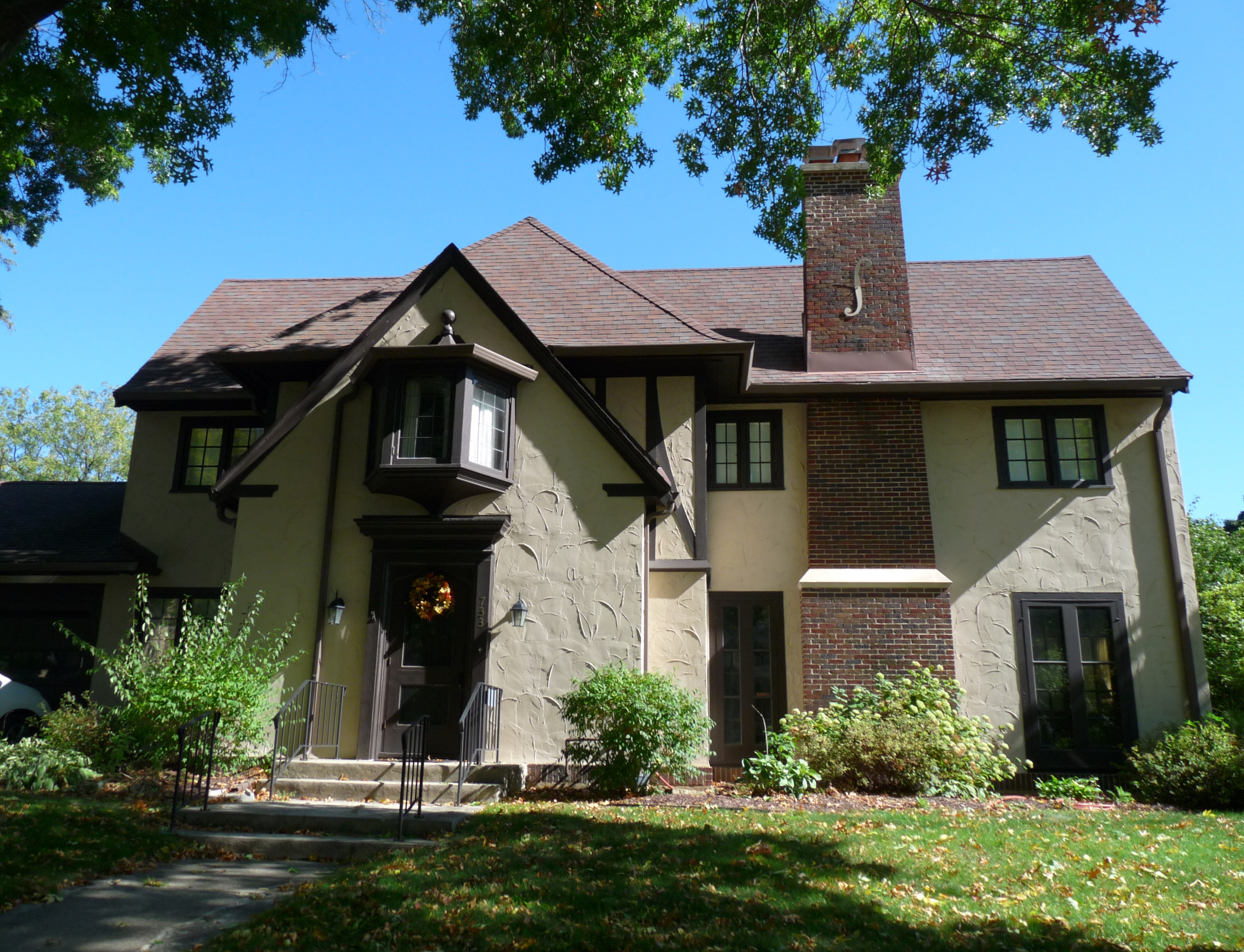
Steeholm house, 1923, Tudor Revival

The Hardy Steeholm house at 733 Huron Hill is a Tudor Revival-style home built in 1923. This style was popular from 1890 to 1940. Hallmarks of the style present in this house are the steep roof surfaces, the asymmetric façade, the prominent chimney, and the false half-timbering. This house does not display the stonework that is common to the style. Steeholm was the president of Wisconsin Magazine. 115 contributing houses in the district are Tudor Revival style.

The Tiffany house at 1001 Seminole Highway is a different form of Tudor Revival, a fairy-tale-ish house built in 1925 with a carefully wood-shingled roof made to look like thatch. It also features careful stonework and an eyebrow dormer. Erwin Tiffany was an associate professor at the UW; Clair Tiffany had a dress shop in Madison.

The Gardner house at 4230 Waban Hill is a Norman Revival house designed by Henry T. Dysland and built in 1929. It has the steep roofs, half-timbering, and multi-pane windows common to Tudor Revival houses, but the main entry through a round corner tower makes it a more Norman version. Louis founded Gardner Baking Co. and helped create the UW Arboretum.

=== International Style ===
The William Day house, at 3718 Nakoma Road, was designed by Hamilton and Gwenydd Beatty as the earliest project of the pioneering Beatty & Strang partnership in 1935. "The scandalous appearance of the International Style flat-roofed Day house, unapproved by the Madison [Nakoma] Realty Company, ... reaffirmed the Company's resolve to prevent such unsightly accidents in the future."

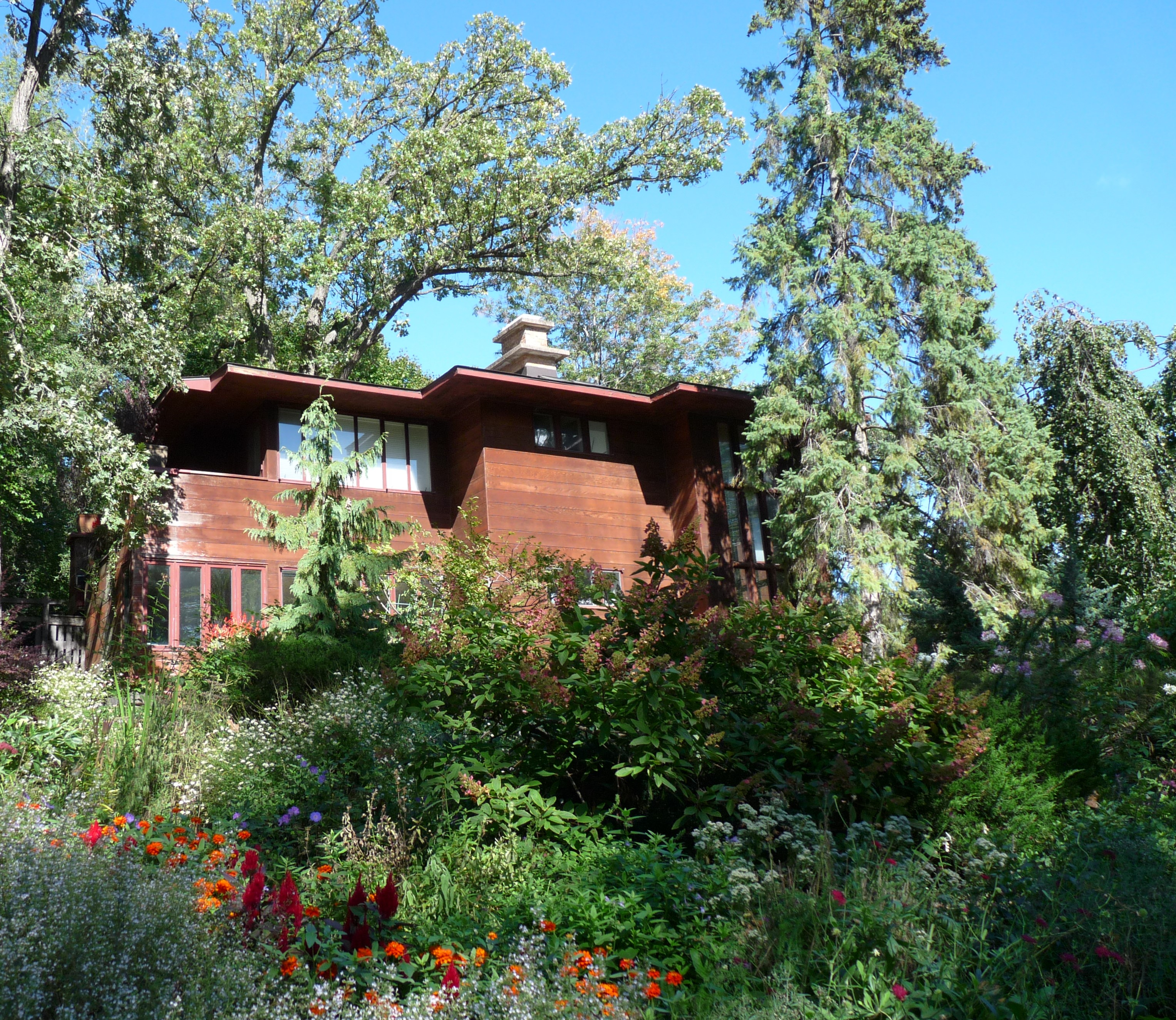
Tangeman house, 1936, International style

The Tangeman house at 3830 Cherokee Drive is an International-style house designed by William V. Kaeser and built in 1936. The horizontal emphasis, the bands of windows running around the corners, and the lack of ornament are typical of the style. A flat roof would be typical too, but the Nakoma Homes Company's reviewers required a low hip roof to fit better with the neighboring houses. Fred Tangeman was a salesman for the Pet Milk Company. Kaeser was the grandson of an original investor in that company, and the brother of the photographer Frederick "Fritz" Kaeser II.
