= O. Arthur Stiennon =

American radiologist

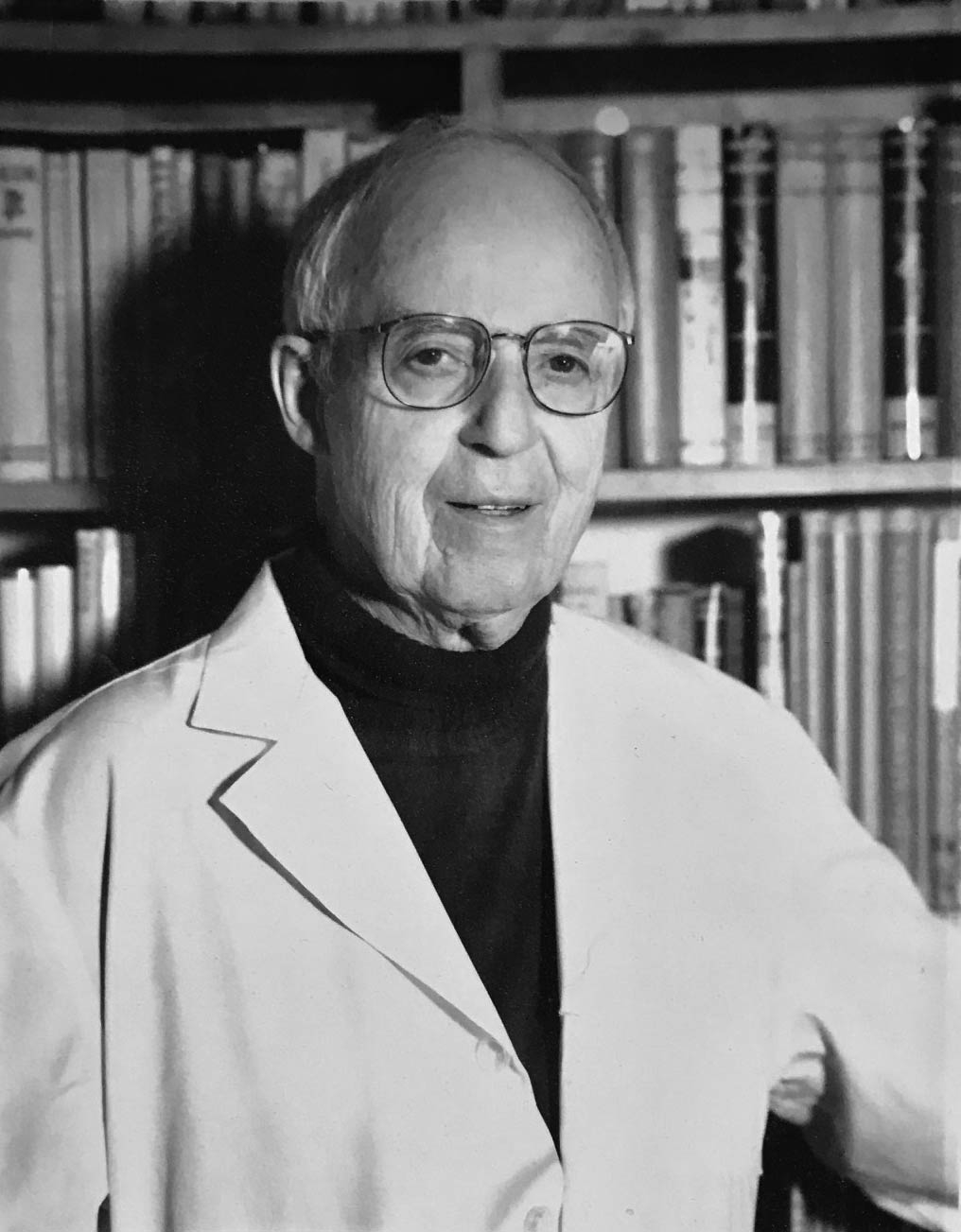
- Dr. Stiennon, Mar. 18, 1999
- Born: November 9, 1919; Green Bay, Wisconsin
- Died: January 10, 2003 (aged 83); Madison, Wisconsin
- Occupation: Radiologist
- Known for: Radiology, software development, real estate development

O. Arthur Stiennon Jr. (November 9, 1919 in Green Bay, Wisconsin – January 10, 2003 in Madison, Wisconsin) was a clinical radiologist, inventor, radiation treatment pioneer, software and real estate developer in Madison, Wisconsin. He attended the University of Wisconsin–Madison, graduating Phi Beta Kappa in 1941. He received his M.D. at the University of Wisconsin in 1943 under the wartime accelerated program. He served an internship at the Royal Victoria Hospital in Montreal, P.Q., Canada. After serving in the United States Army from 1944 to 1947, he served a residency in Diagnostic and Therapeutic Radiology at the University of Michigan Hospitals in Ann Arbor, Michigan.

He received board certification by the American Board of Radiology in 1950. On his return to Madison, he practiced initially with Dr. Larry Littig, before starting his own practice serving small hospitals in Darlington and Dodgeville and opening his own office in the Tenney Building at 110 East Main Street in Madison. This practice evolved into Madison Radiologists, S.C. and at the time of his departure in 1973 in addition to an office at 20 S. Park St. in Madison, served St. Mary's Hospital Medical Center, St. Clare's Hospital, Baraboo, and General Hospital Sauk City as well as the hospitals in Darlington and Dodgeville. He opened a new private office practice, Stiennon Radiology Group at One South Park St in Madison in 1975 and continued to practice in association with his two radiologist sons until his retirement in 2001.

== Community activities ==
He was a flutist and chamber music exponent, regularly assembling chamber music groups at his home. He served on a steering committee chaired by Leo T. Crowley which worked to raise funds for the Diocesan Holy Name Seminary

== Radiation treatment center ==
He opened the Radiation Center, the first private medical center to treat cancer patients with a betatron, at 2716 Marshall Court in the Village of Shorewood Hills a suburb of Madison, Wisconsin, in 1957. The facility employed one of the first Allis-Chalmers 25 MeV Betatrons and brought the era of modern megavoltage radiation therapy to the Madison area. Evenings the machine was used to analyze industrial castings, including some related to the Titan Missile.

== The Longitudinal Muscle in Esophageal Disease ==
He published a book, The Longitudinal Muscle in Esophageal Disease about his conclusions concerning the esophagus obtained from a lifetime of experience in radiology. Among his conclusions was that achalasia and barrett's esophagus are not unique diseases, as has been traditionally thought, but a subset of hiatus hernia.

== Stiennon telescopic bowsight ==
A lifelong entrepreneur, he founded Scientific Sports Equipment in 1963 to manufacture and market his invention of a practical optical bowsight. This archery sight provided a light located on the side of the telescope which was reflected into the viewer's eye to form the appearance of a light in the general area of the target when the bow is properly aligned. The sights were manufactured by Realist, Inc. of Menomonee Falls, Wisconsin. The device received Japanese Pat. No. 427,091 dated May 2, 1966.

== Software development and publishing ==
He began writing computer programs for agricultural use in 1969, and went on to develop an agricultural software package, AgPac. The application was sold to Wisconsin Microware, which published it in the 1980s. His MONEY MATRIX, a financial management and accounting software package, was released in 1986.

His longtime interest in swallowing function resulted in the publication of a monograph, The Longitudinal Muscle in Esophageal Disease, in 1995, by WRS Press.

== Agricultural and real estate development ==
In 1965 he founded Cold Comfort Farms, assembling what eventually grew to more than 20 farms totalling more than 4,000 acres (16 km^{2}) in western Dane and eastern Iowa counties, raising purebred Angus, then moving into grain and contract forage production. He developed Shackleton Square Condominium , the first multifamily housing in Shorewood Hills in 1984 and continued to live there until his death. Around 1985 he filed for bankruptcy, breached contracts and lost many of his properties.
