= Samuel Moore House =

Historic house in Wisconsin, United States

- U.S. Historic district – Contributing property
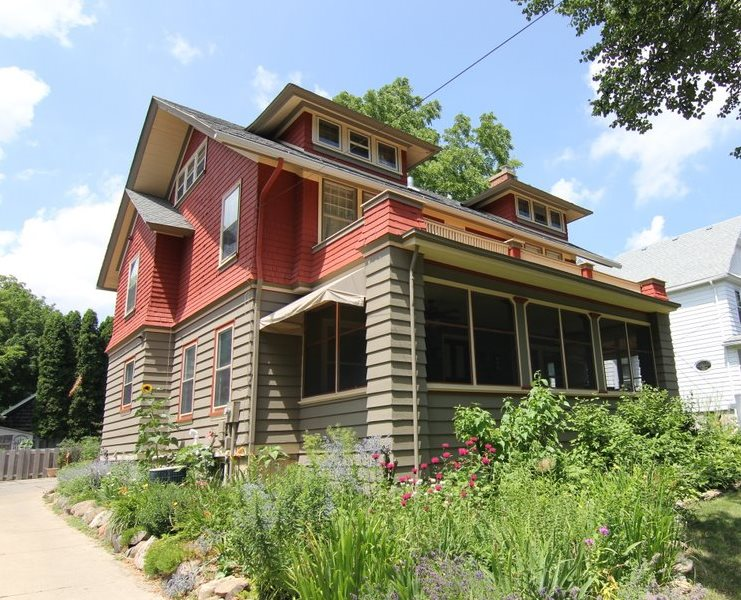

- Location within Wisconsin Location within the United States
- Location: 112 Lathrop Street, Madison, Wisconsin
- Coordinates: 43°4′12″N 89°24′54″W
- Built: 1912
- Architect: Charles E. Marks
- Part of: University Heights Historic District (ID82001844)
- Designated CP: December 17, 1982

Samuel Moore House is a historic house located in the University Heights Historic District in Downtown Madison, Wisconsin. It was placed on the on National Register of Historic Places in 1982, and on the Wisconsin State Register for historic places in 1989.

== Description and history ==
The Moore House is an example of the mature American Craftsman style architecture in the University Heights Historic District which combines traditional woodwork, design and craftsmanship while adapting features that were in style during the period. It was built in 1912 by a well-known local carpenter, contractor and architect, Charles E. Marks. It exemplifies his influence to the American Craftsman style and also, Prairie School design that was emerging in Madison during that time period. Often compared to Claude and Starck homes, the Moore house has a symmetrical main façade with two matching dormers on the third floor, multi-paned windows and wide overhangs eaves. The exterior façade also mixes wide plank cedar siding on the main floor which transitions to the traditional shake features on the second floor. In addition, Marks built multiple roof lines and bump-outs which give the house a sense of the floor plan within. The interior design features an entrance with heavy oak features. Marks took advantage of local immigrants who were skilled in woodworking from the old country and incorporated their skillful trade throughout the house. During this period, it was common to use solid paneled doors between rooms and entryways. Marks, with his eye for carpentry, had intricate custom made multi-glass paneled pocket and entry doors made for the Moore House which makes this house unique to itself. Marks also enlarged the main staircase which was common in larger homes of this time.

Samuel Moore, an assistant professor of English at University of Wisconsin, lived in this house for 3 years before taking a position as an associate professor at University of Michigan.
