= Henry T. Dysland =

American architect

Henry T. Dysland (1885-1965) was an architect based in Madison, Wisconsin.

== Personal life ==
He was born in Green Bay, Wisconsin in 1885 to Norwegian parents. He studied at George Washington University in Washington, D.C., and he also studied under Donn Barber in New York City. He died in California in 1965.

== Works ==
A number of his works are listed for their architecture on the National Register of Historic Places, within three historic districts in Madison.

- College Hills Historic District:
  - William G. & Imogen Hart House 2913 Columbia Road (1928)
  - Ronald & May Luxford House 1122 Dartmouth Rd. (1931)
  - William P. & Emma Morgan House 3210 Oxford Rd. (1927)
  - John W. & Helen Thompson House 1223 Dartmouth Rd. (1937)
  - Prof. Glenn T. & Sarita Trewartha House 1234 Sweetbriar Road (1931)
- Fourth Lake Ridge Historic District, roughly bounded by Lake Mendota, N. Brearly, E. Johnson, and N. Franklin Sts.
- Nakoma Historic District, roughly bounded by Odana Rd., Mantou Wy., Mowhack Dr., and Whedona Dr.

The Henry and Helen Dysland House is on a walking tour of historic houses in Nakoma.
