= Herbert Fritz Jr. =

American architect

Herbert Fritz Jr. (1915–1998) was an American architect. He designed several hundred residences and commercial buildings in the Madison, Wisconsin area or elsewhere in Wisconsin and the nation. He had a "distinctly personal modernist sensibility that was strongly influenced by the organic architecture of Frank Lloyd Wright." He was an apprentice to Frank Lloyd Wright from 1938 until 1941.

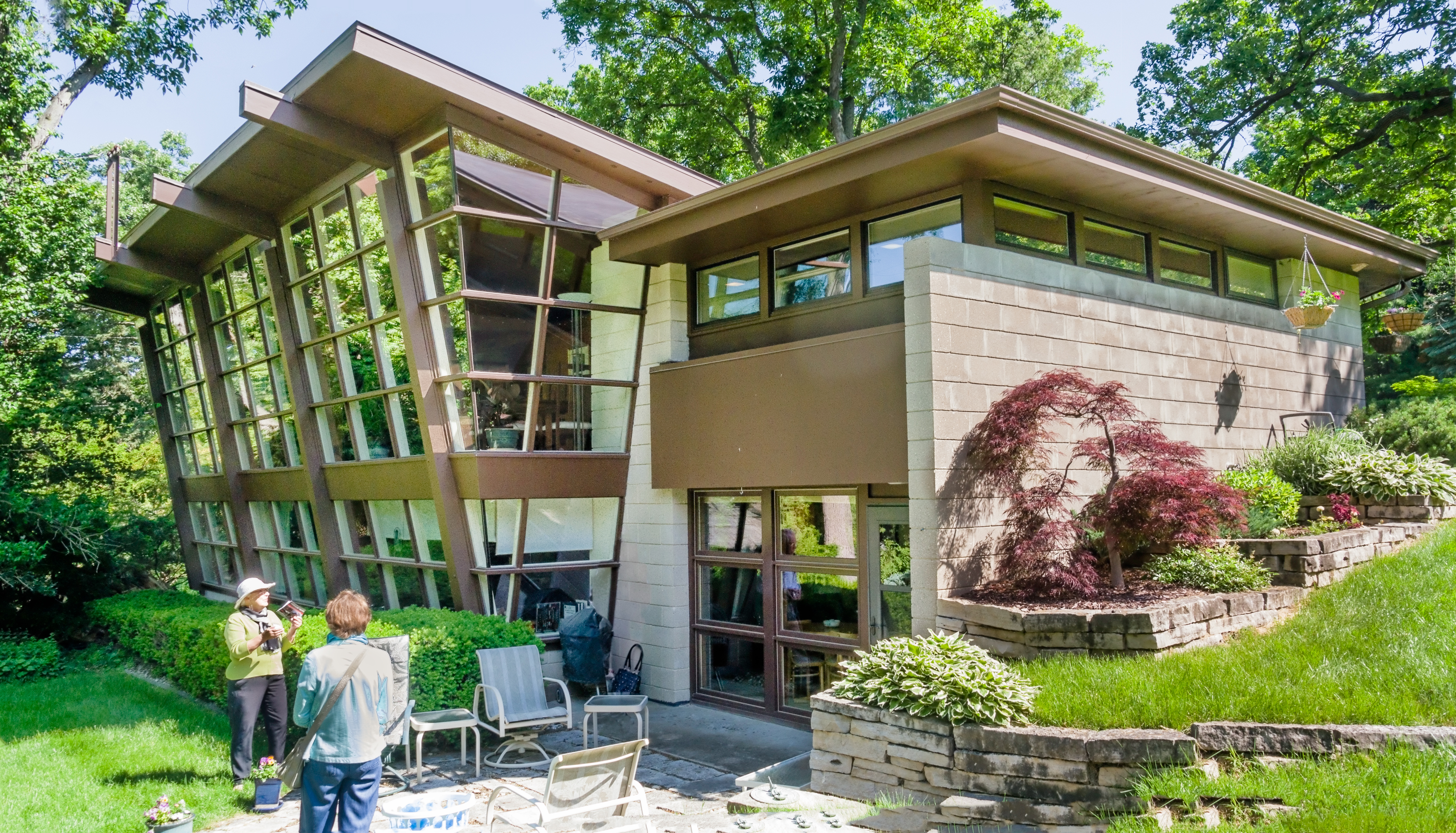
Heidelberger House, built 1951

Fritz was born in 1915 in Sioux City, Iowa. His father Herbert Fritz Sr. was an architectural draftsman who met Mary Larson, his wife and Herbert Fritz Jr.'s mother, while working in the offices of Frank Lloyd Wright at Taliesin in Spring Green, Wisconsin. Mary Larson was daughter of stonemason Alfred Larson. His younger sister Frances Marie Fritz Caraway (1918–2009) was also a noted architect.

In 1952 he designed the Prof. Philip M. and Marian Raup House, at 2908 Oxford Road in Shorewood Hills, Wisconsin, that is listed on the National Register of Historic Places for its architecture, within College Hills Historic District. Additionally, he helped design the Dr. Charles and Judith Heidelberger House, which is also listed on the register.

In 1972 he designed the Telemark Lodge in Cable, Wisconsin, home to the American Birkebeiner. The building was demolished in 2021 due to declining patronage and irreparable damage.

There was a different Herb Fritz (1950–2014), also an architect, who served on Tulsa's historic preservation commission from 1992 to 2007.
