= Dr. Charles and Judith Heidelberger House =

Historic house in Wisconsin, United States

- U.S. National Register of Historic Places
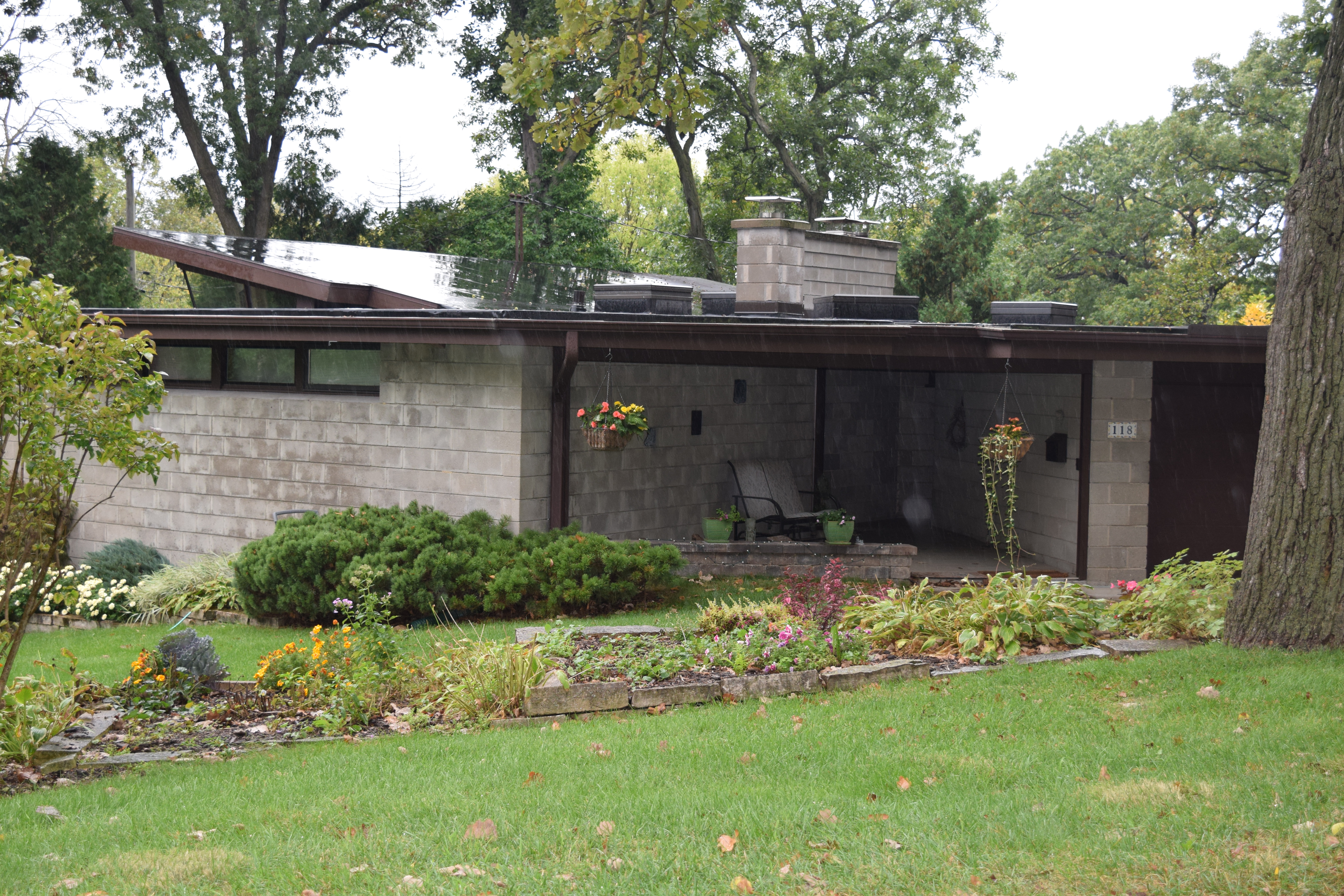
- Dr. Charles and Judith Heidelberger House, October 2017
- Location: 118 Vaughn Court; Madison, Wisconsin; United States
- Coordinates: 43.0649°N 89.4450°W
- Built: 1951
- Built by: Lloyd Foust
- Architect: Herbert Fritz, Jr.
- Architectural style: Modern Movement
- NRHP reference No.: 100001255
- Added to NRHP: June 26, 2017

The Dr. Charles and Judith Heidelberger House is a Contemporary-style house designed by Herbert Fritz Jr. and built in 1951 in Madison, Wisconsin, United States. In 2017 the house was added to the National Register of Historic Places.

== History ==
Charles Heidelberger was a member of the faculty of what would become the University of Wisconsin–Madison. He was also a member of the National Academy of Sciences, and a world-renowned cancer researcher who developed the medication Fluorouracil.

In 1951 the Heidelbergers hired Herb Fritz Jr. to design a modern house for them. Fritz was an admirer of Frank Lloyd Wright, having been a member of the Taliesin Fellowship. He designed a modest-sized but spectacular contemporary-style house set into the hillside, with concrete block walls facing the street and expansive windows looking out the back. In 1956 the Heidelbergers added a two-story master bedroom, also designed by Herb Fritz.

In 2017 the house was added to the State and the National Register of Historic Places - "one of Herb Fritz's early masterworks."

== Photos ==
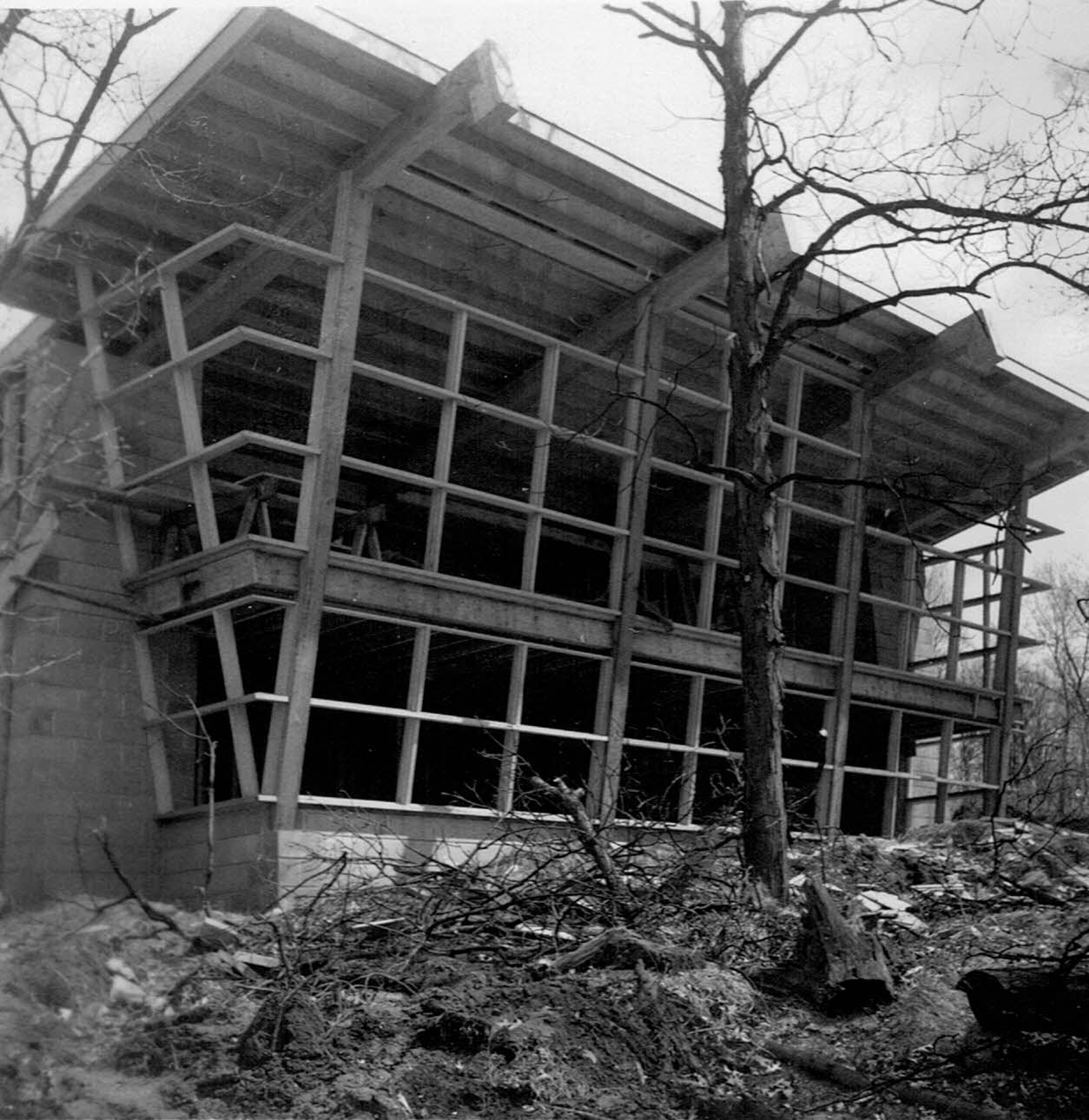
House Under Construction, 1951

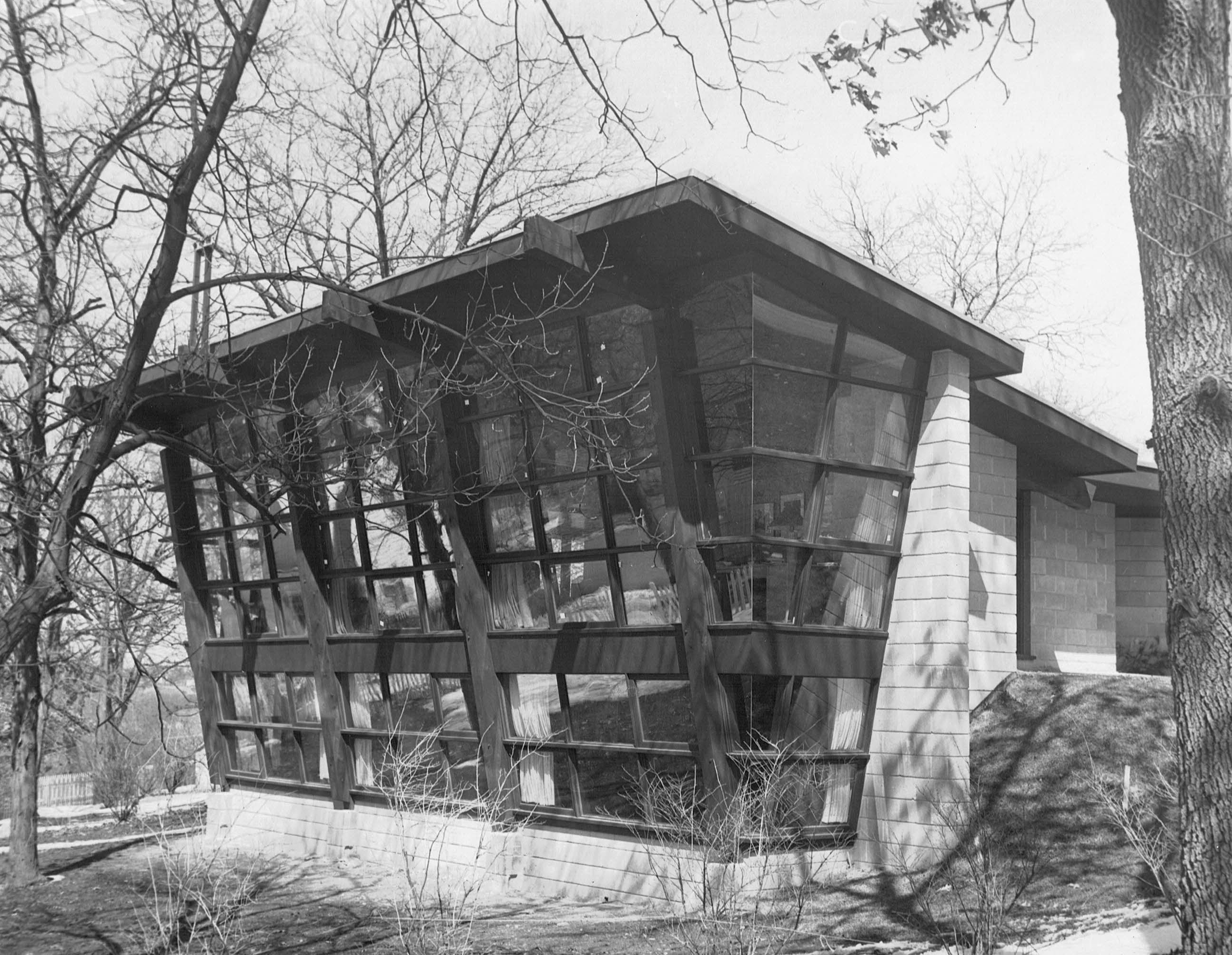
Dr. Charles and Judith Heidelberger House, 1952

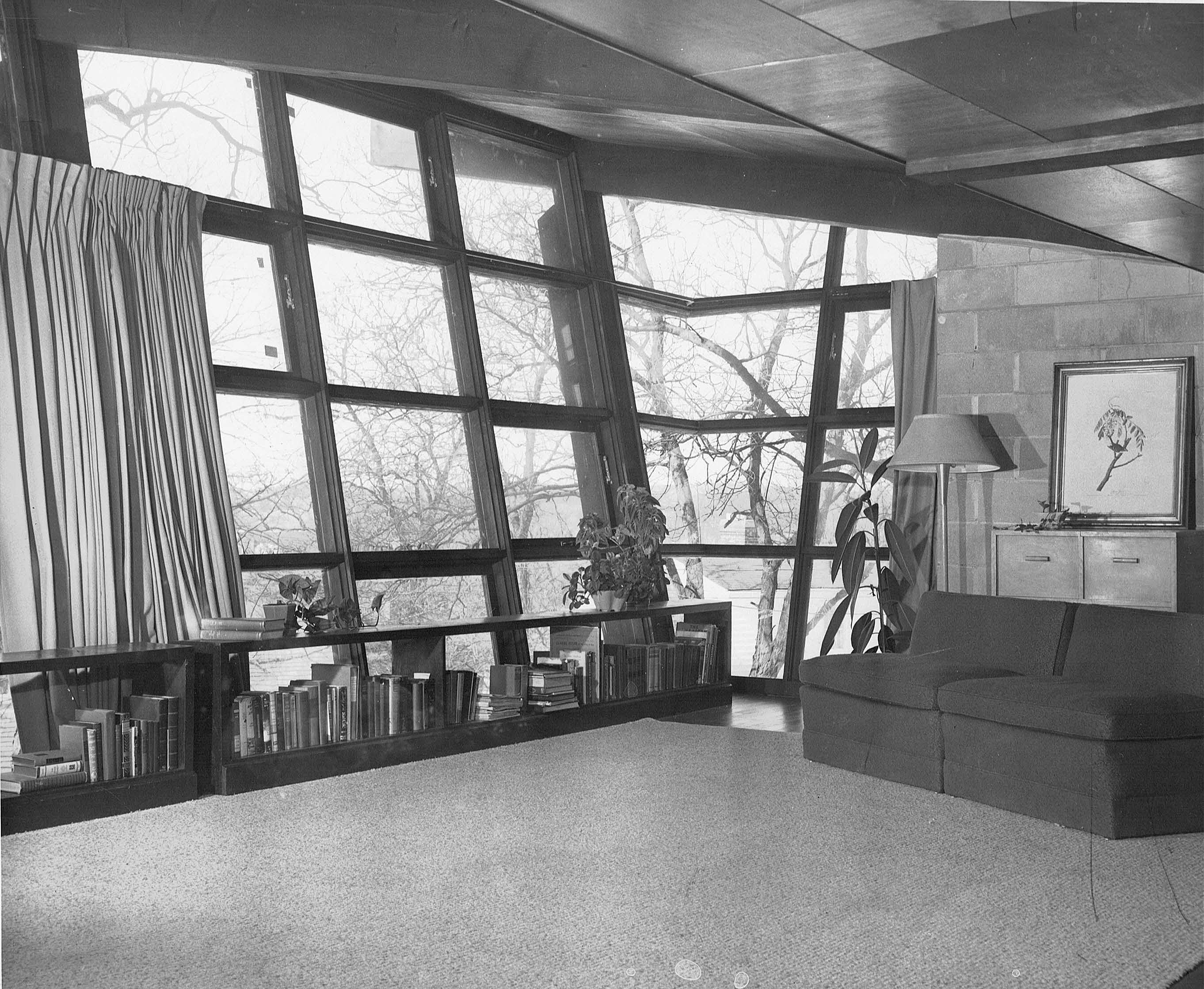
House interior, 1952. The sloped ceilings are made of Philippine mahogany.

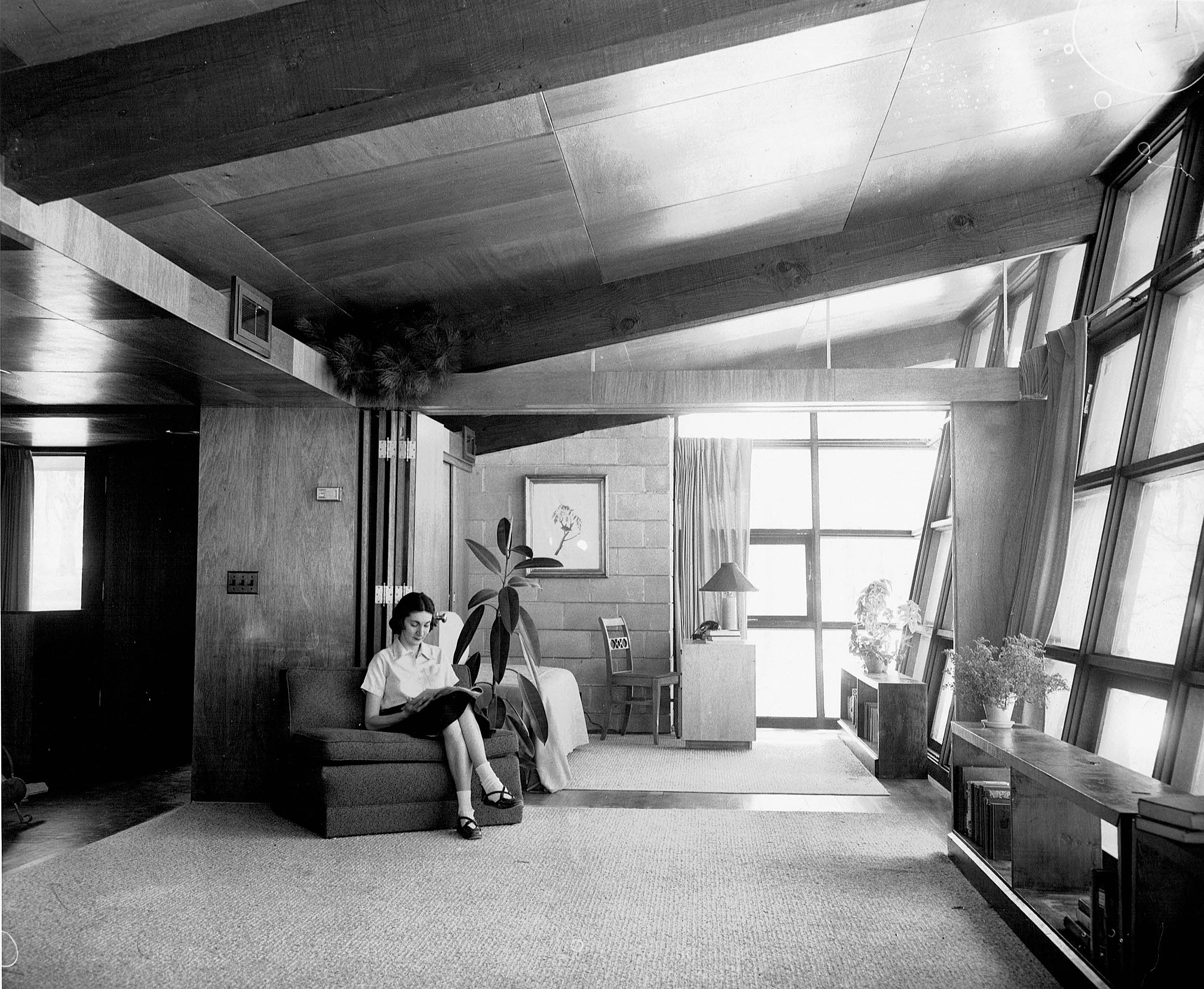
Judith Heidelberger in the living room of the house, 1952

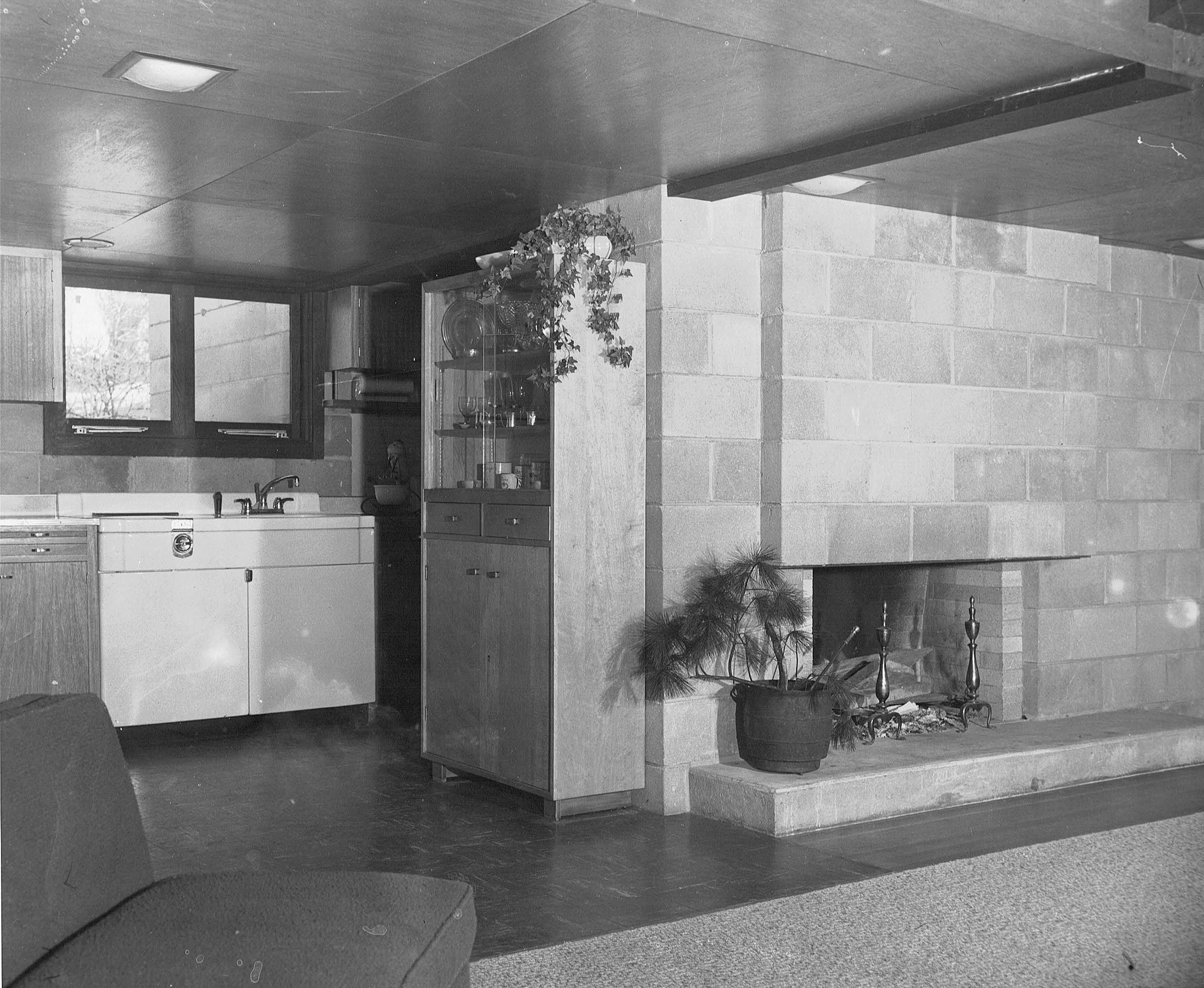
The kitchen and cinderblock fireplace, 1952

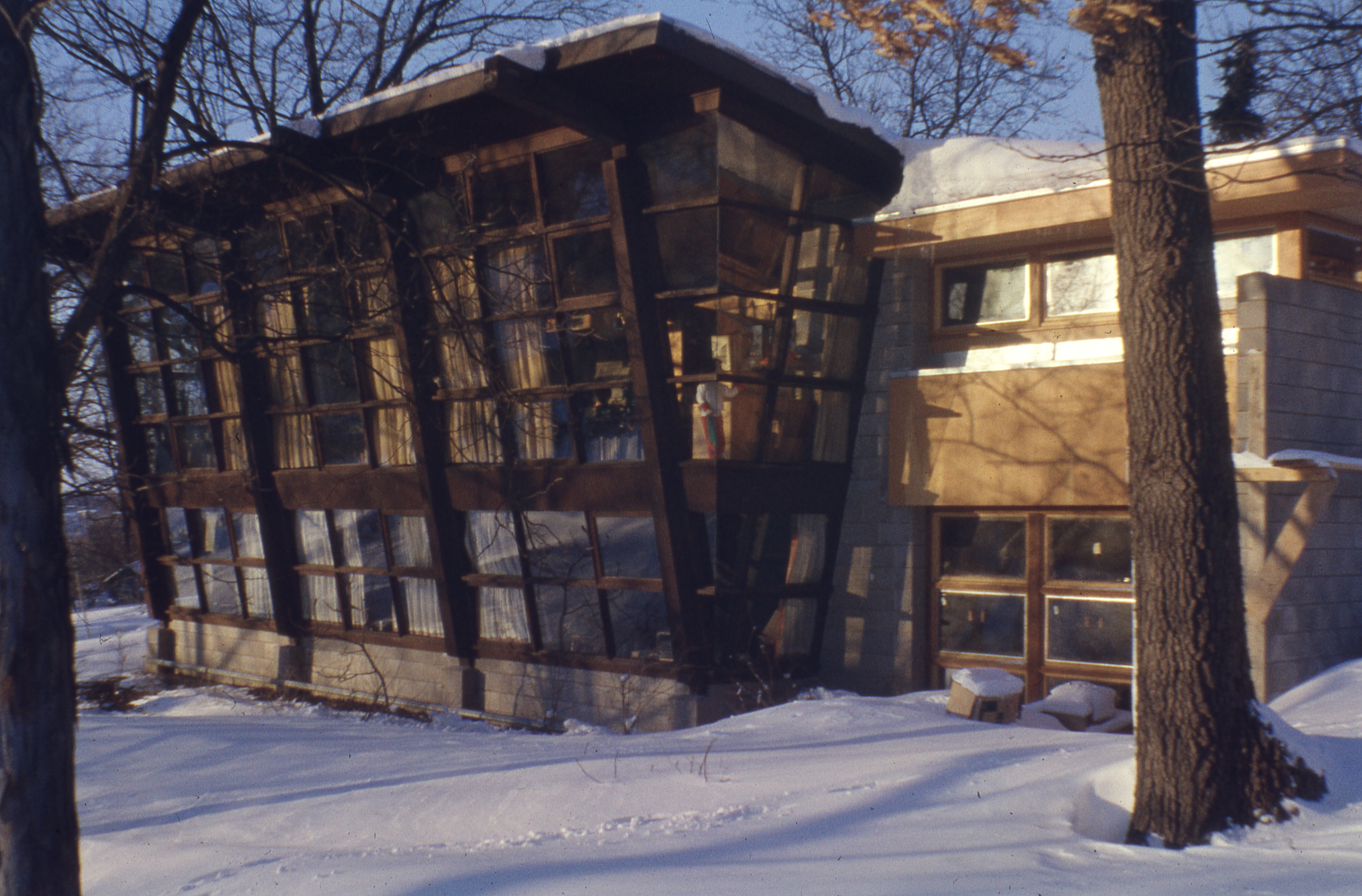
The house in 1956, near the completion of the Herb Fritz master bedroom addition.

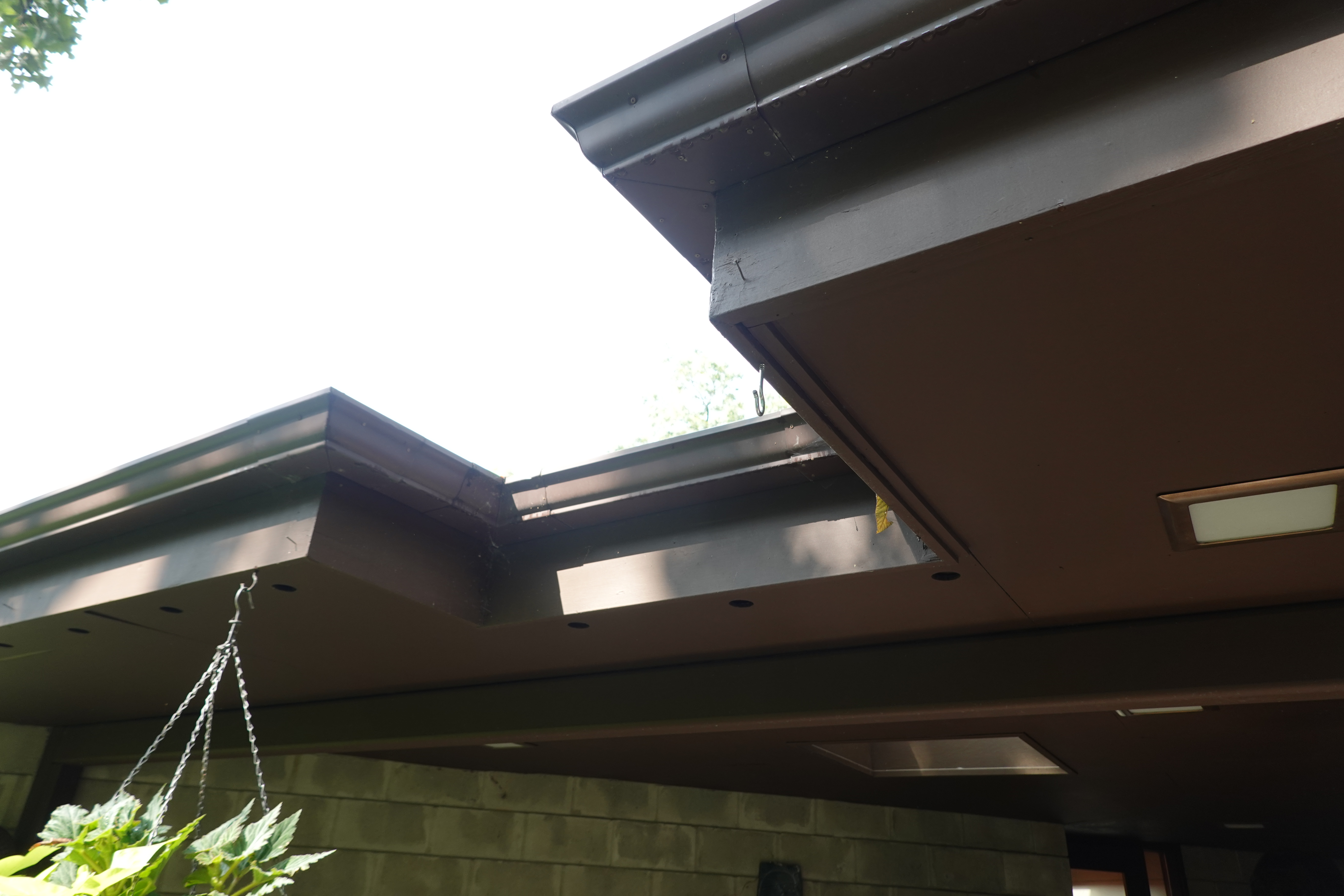
Architect Herb Fritz designed a notch into the 1956 addition to the house in order to preserve an extant shagbark hickory tree.

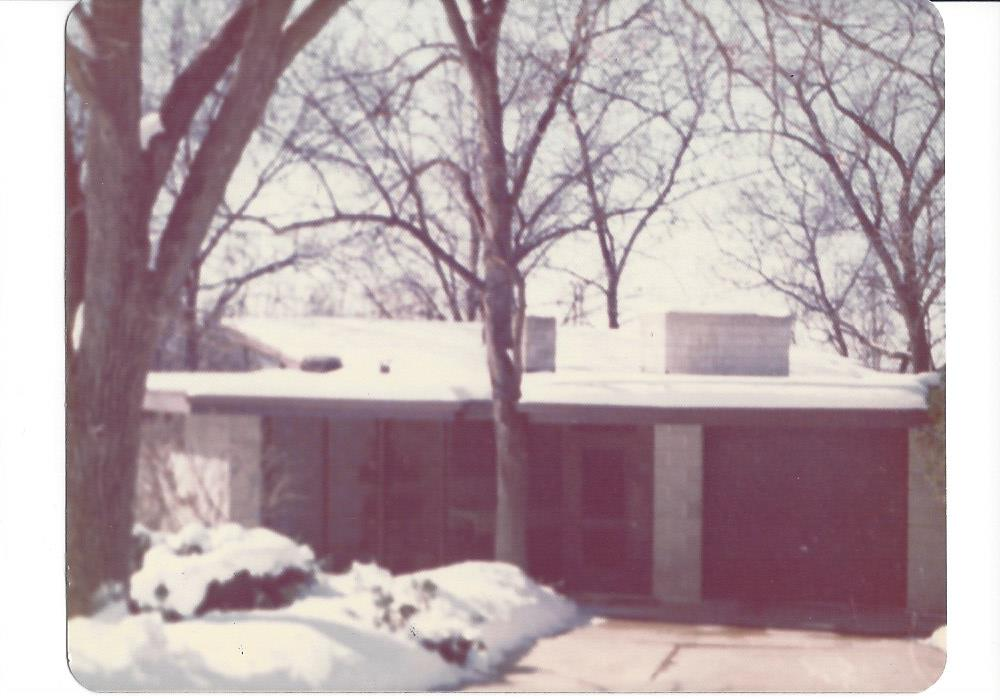
Street-view, circa 1965, showing the shagbark hickory tree growing through the notch in the roof. The tree was later removed for safety reasons.

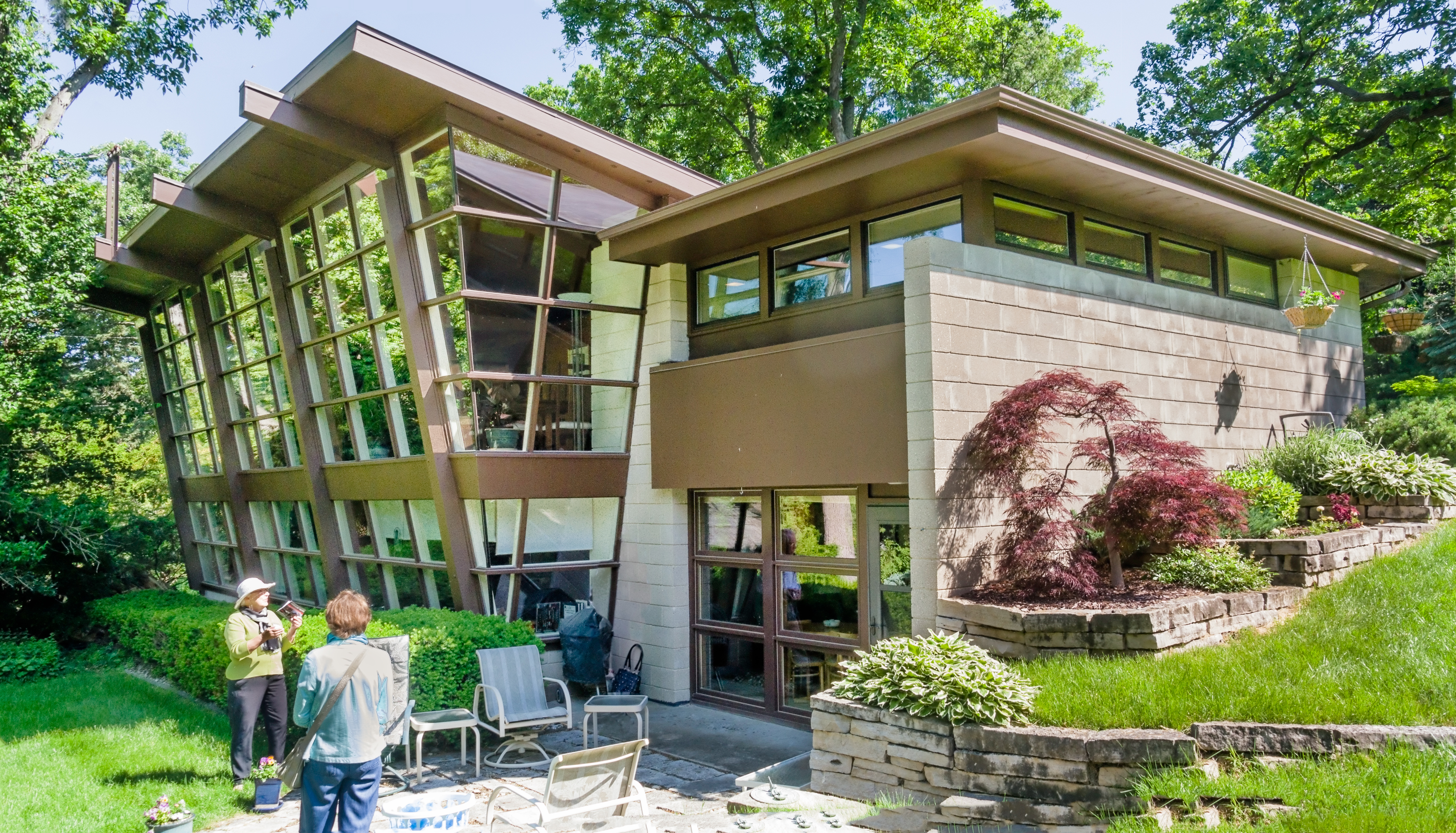
Rear of Dr. Charles and Judith Heidelberger House, June 2015. The owners commented that viewing a snowstorm from inside is similar to being inside a snow globe.

== See also ==
- National Register of Historic Places listings in Madison, Wisconsin
