= Charles Heidelberger =

American physician

Charles Heidelberger (December 23, 1920 – January 18, 1983) was a cancer researcher who developed and patented an anticancer drug called 5-Fluorouracil that remains widely used against cancers of the stomach, colon and breast. He was also director of basic research at the University of Southern California's Comprehensive Cancer Center. He received an American Cancer Society National Award in 1974. Heidelberger served on editorial boards of various scientific journals: Cancer Research, Molecular Pharmacology, Biochemical Pharmacology, the International Journal of Cancer, In Vitro, and the Journal of Medicinal Chemistry. He served as director for Basic Research of the USC Cancer Center, and was a distinguished professor at the University of Southern California. His former home in Madison, Wisconsin, now known as the Dr. Charles and Judith Heidelberger House, is listed on the National Register of Historic Places.

== Notable awards and distinctions ==
Heidelberger received the following awards:

- Elected to the National Academy of Sciences, U.S.A. in 1978
- The Langer-Teplitz Award for Cancer Research in 1958
- Walter I. Hubert Lecturer for the British Association for Cancer Research in 1969
- Lucy Wortham James Award of the James Ewing Society (1969)
- G. H. A. Clowes Memorial Award and Lectureship of the American Association for Cancer Research (1970)
- American Cancer Society National Award (1974)
- Lila Gruber Award of the American Academy of Dermatology (1976)
- Papanicolaou Award for Scientific Achievement (1978)
- Chemical Industry Institute of Toxicology Founder's Award (1982)
- C. Chester Stock Award of the Memorial Sloan-Kettering Cancer Center (1982)
- The first Athayde International Cancer Prize

== Notable publications ==
Most notable publications:

- The role of chemicals and radiation in the etiology of cancer (book), held by 171 libraries worldwide
- Improved scoring of chemical transformation of C3H/10T1/2 cells (book), held by 60 libraries worldwide

== Career ==
Heidelberger was born in New York City on December 23, 1920. His father Michael was a famous immunologist. Heidelberger graduated from Harvard with S.B in chemistry in 1942, and with M.S. and Ph.D. degrees in organic chemistry in 1944 and 1946 respectively, also from Harvard. He became a professor of Oncology at the University of Wisconsin in 1948. In 1960 he received American Cancer Society Professorship of Oncology which he retained until 1976. In 1976 Heidelberger accepted position of Professor of Biochemistry and Pathology, as well as Director for Basic Research of the USC Cancer Center. He became a distinguished professor at the University of Southern California in 1981. He died of cancer, the disease he devoted his life to eradicating.
