= Charles E. Marks =

Charles E. Marks (1875–1926) was a skilled carpenter who later became a general contractor in Madison, Wisconsin, in the early twentieth century. Using mostly his personal designs, he built homes in the Prairie School design and American Craftsman style. He built many important buildings and homes in the Madison, Wisconsin area.

== Madison, Wisconsin Buildings ==
- Samuel Moore House, 112 Lathrop Street (built 1912; on the National Register of Historic Places since 1982)
- Charles and Minerva Marks House, Jefferson St (built 1905; on the National Register of Historic Places since 1999)
- Charles H. and Caroline Mills House, Jefferson St (built 1915; on the National Register of Historic Places since 1999)
- E.A. Brown / Charles and Minerva Marks House, Jefferson St (built 1911; on the National Register of Historic Places since 1999)
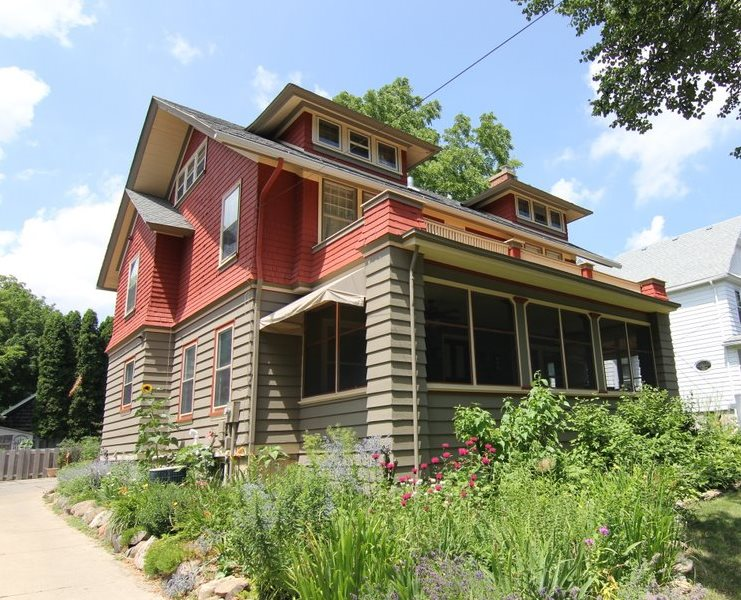
Samuel Moore House

He was instrumental in development of area of College Hills Historic District in Madison, which includes a number of houses that he designed and/or built.
