= Frederick Kaeser =

American photographer

Frederick "Fritz" Kaeser II (1910-1990) was an American photographer who worked in Madison, Wisconsin, Aspen, Colorado, and the American Southwest. He also did photography for the U. S. Army during World War II. Kaeser and his wife Milly established an endowment for photography at Notre Dame University.

== Early life ==
Frederick Kaeser II was born on July 3, 1910 in Greenville, Illinois to a family of Swiss background. His grandfather, Frederick Kaeser, was one the original investors, in 1885, in the Helvetia Milk Condensing Company in nearby Highland, Illinois, which was home to many immigrants from Switzerland and Germany. Frederick(I)'s son Albert was later also involved in the company. Frederick II studied at the University of Illinois (industrial arts), at the University of Wisconsin, and at the Art Institute of Chicago, where he switched from art to photography.

== Professional Work ==
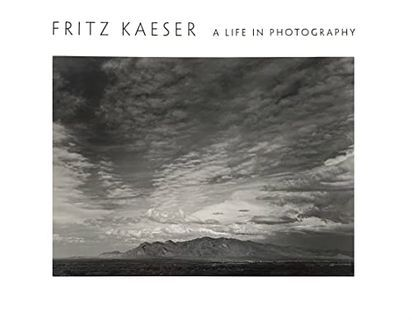
Fritz Kaeser book cover

After college, Kaeser worked as an assistant to Hollywood, CA portrait photographer William Mortensen. He then relocated to Madison, Wisconsin, where he opened a photographic studio. While there, he contributed to several architecture books and architectural journals for the pioneering firm of Beatty & Strang, among others. (Kaeser's brother, William, was also an early modern architect in Madison, and designed a home there for Frederick II.)

Andre Roch Skiing, by Fritz Kaeser Raclin Murphy Museum of Art (gift of Milly Kaeser)

Kaeser and his wife, Milly, built a summer home in Aspen, Colorado, and spent time there in the winter as well, where he became an early ski photographer. During World War II, Kaeser joined the 10th Mountain Division, based at Camp Hale, Colorado, and contributed to the division's newspaper. After the war, he studied briefly with Ansel Adams. The Kaesers also built a house in Tucson, Arizona, where he "photograph[ed] natural textures and patterns found in the earth". The Center for Creative Photography at the University of Arizona has a collection of Kaeser's work, equipment, papers and correspondence, including with Adams and Minor White.

== Later life ==
"Fritz's Pet Milk inheritance enabled him to pursue a lifetime devoted to his hobbies." In addition to photography, he was interested in rock collecting and polishing, setting up a studio in Arizona and a shop in Colorado. After Kaeser's death in 1990, his widow established the Fritz and Milly Kaeser Endowment for Photography at Notre Dame University's Snite Museum of Art (now Raclin Murphy Museum of Art), as well as donating some pieces of Kaeser's work.
