= Joseph John Annabring =

Catholic bishop

His Excellency, The Most Reverend Joseph John Annabring
- Bishop of Superior
- Church: Catholic Church
- Diocese: Diocese of Superior
- In office: March 25, 1954—August 27, 1959
- Predecessor: Albert Gregory Meyer
- Successor: George Albert Hammes
- Previous post: Cathedral Rector

Orders
- Ordination: May 3, 1927 by Theodore H. Reverman
- Consecration: March 25, 1954 by Albert Gregory Meyer

Personal details
- Born: March 19, 1900 Szaparyliget, Austria-Hungary (now Romania)
- Died: August 27, 1959 (aged 59) Superior, Wisconsin, US
- Buried: Calvary Cemetery, Superior
- Denomination: Catholic Church
- Parents: Joseph and Elizabeth Annabring
- Education: St. Francis Seminary; Saint Paul Seminary School of Divinity

Joseph John Annabring (March 19, 1900 – August 27, 1959) was a prelate of the Catholic Church who served as the seventh bishop of the Diocese of Superior in Wisconsin.

== Biography ==
=== Early life ===
Joseph Annabring was born on March 19, 1900, in Szataryliget in what was then Austria-Hungary (present-day Romania) to Joseph and Elizabeth Annabring The family emigrated to the United States in 1903, buying a dairy farm in Turtle Lake, Wisconsin. After attending public elementary schools, Joseph Annabring decided to become a priest. At age 15, he enter St. Francis de Sales Seminary in Milwaukee. Annabring then went to the Grand Seminary in Montreal, Quebec, to study philosophy. His final studies were at St. Paul Seminary in St. Paul, Minnesota for theology.

=== Priesthood ===
Annabring was ordained to the priesthood in Superior, Wisconsin, for the Diocese of Superior on May 3, 1927 by Bishop Theodore Henry Reverman. After his ordination, the diocese assigned Annabring as assistant pastor at the Cathedral of Christ the King Parish. He also taught science and religion at the Cathedral High School and served as its athletic director. Annabring was named superintendent of the diocesans schools in 1934.

=== Bishop of Superior ===
On January 27, 1954, Pope Pius XII appointed Annabring as bishop of Superior. He was consecrated at the Cathedral of Christ the King in Superior, on March 25, 1954.

Annabring died on August 27, 1959, in Superior.

== See also ==
- Catholic Church hierarchy
- Catholic Church in the United States
- Historical list of the Catholic bishops of the United States
- List of Catholic bishops of the United States
- Lists of patriarchs, archbishops, and bishops

Catholic Church titles
Preceded by Albert Gregory Meyer	Bishop of Superior; 1954–1959	Succeeded by George Albert Hammes
