= Ryan Erickson =

Catholic priest and double murderer

- Church: Catholic Church
- Diocese: Superior

Orders
- Ordination: June 4, 2000 by Bishop Raphael Michael Fliss

Personal details
- Born: January 17, 1973 Fond du Lac, Wisconsin
- Died: December 19, 2004 (aged 31) Hurley, Wisconsin
- Occupation: Associate pastor

Ryan Gene Erickson (January 17, 1973 – December 19, 2004) was an American Catholic priest who served as associate pastor at St. Patrick Church in Hudson, Wisconsin, and died by suicide in 2004. In 2005, a judge found probable cause that Erickson had murdered funeral home director Daniel O'Connell and mortuary science intern James Ellison in 2002, shortly before O'Connell was to confront Erickson with allegations that he had sexually abused a teenage boy. Just prior to his suicide, police had questioned Erickson about the two killings, searched his rectory and seized his computer, finding images of child sexual abuse.

== Background ==
=== Ryan Erickson ===
Erickson was born in Fond du Lac, Wisconsin and grew up in Campbellsport. His parents moved when he was in his early teens and he went to live with a priest but "spent summers with his family at a campground in Eagle River, Wisconsin".

Erickson was known as a "young, energetic, charismatic, pistol-packing" priest. (Erickson owned 16 guns and was known for his good aim.) He was "ultra-conservative" and "passionate" about two issues: his opposition to abortion and to homosexuality. When celebrating mass he was known to disdain the "orgy of handshaking and hugs" of contemporary Catholic masses. During the consecration of the host, he would dramatically hold the eucharist aloft, over his head "for a minute" with tears rolling down his cheeks.

An example of his concern for the temptations of the flesh was expressed in a "thought for the day" e-mail to his supporters at St. Patrick's church:

"Even Sunday Mass is not safe from the immodest dress of some devils. They come to read, give out Holy Communion, etc....looking like an advertisement. There [sic] immodest dress says to all present: I'm easy! Please go home and masturbate to my beautiful body. The sad thing is that some do."

Erickson's strict, conservative views led to tensions with more liberal Catholics at St. Patrick's church and the resignation of the principal at the school, but the priest also had his share of supporters.

According to investigators’ reports conducted after his suicide, there was another side of Erickson's personality. "When Erickson was 6 years old, he had sexual contact with a 4-year-old male cousin; when he was 19, he had sexual contact with a 14-year-old boy; when he was 21, he was investigated for allegedly sexually assaulting a boy at a summer resort."

According to Raphael Michael Fliss—bishop of the Roman Catholic Diocese of Superior at the time—the diocese was informed of allegations of inappropriate sexual behavior by Erickson in 1992, but an investigation by Catholic authorities of Erickson concluded that he “does not appear to be predatory or exploitative in his overall orientation, and he does not seem to be a high risk for acting in a sexually aggressive or manipulative manner in the future”. Erickson "was allowed to enter St. Paul Seminary," (he had already been admitted provisionally) ordained in June 2000 and assigned to St. Patrick's Church in Hudson, Wisconsin about 20 miles from St. Paul, Minnesota.

During the post-suicide hearing, a teenage boy from nearby Somerset, Wisconsin spoke of being molested by Erickson.

From 2000 to 2002, the victim testified, he spent many weekends at the rectory with Erickson, watching horror movies and playing drinking games. He estimated that Erickson had supplied him more than 1,200 cans of beer and the same amount of liquor shots.

The teenager could "remember about ten" sexual incidents with Erickson, but was "frequently so drunk" while spending time with Erickson that he could not remember what happened the night before when he woke up. After police confiscated Erickson's computer they found "a deeply buried file" that had been created on August 26, 2004, and last accessed December 12, 2004, shortly before Erickson’s suicide. It contained “more than forty images of gay and prepubescent male pornography in a variety of sex acts and poses,” some "involving bondage".

=== Daniel O'Connell ===
The intended murder victim, 39-year-old Dan O'Connell, was a member of "one of Hudson's most prominent families" and the manager of O'Connell Funeral Home, married, with two elementary school-aged children. He was active in his community, a "gregarious and sociable" Rotarian who volunteered as a paramedic, and in local festivals and parades. "Not much went on in Hudson that he didn't hear about", according to Bruce Rubenstein in the City Pages newsweekly.

== Murders ==
On February 5, 2002, funeral home director Daniel O'Connell and mortuary science intern James Ellison were found shot to death at O'Connell Funeral Home.

According to Rubenstein,

a county medical examiner discovered the bodies in the early afternoon, while he was visiting the funeral home to pick up a death certificate. The scene of the crime that he found clearly suggested that O'Connell had been the target. He was shot to death where he was sitting, behind his desk. Ellison had risen from his chair and was bolting for the door when he was shot in the back. Investigators theorized that an argument between O'Connell and the perpetrator had erupted into sudden violence. Ellison was murdered because he was a witness.

According to Leon Podles,

Between 1:08 and 1:22 p.m., February 5, 2002, Erickson entered the funeral home. O’Connell was at his desk. Erickson shot him at point blank range once in the head with a 9mm semiautomatic pistol, killing him instantly. Erickson left the office; Ellison came into the room, saw O’Connell’s body and walked toward it. Erickson returned and fired again but missed. Erickson then shot Ellison through the skull at point blank range. Ellison died instantly and collapsed over the chair, with a bullet casing underneath him. Head shots are effective but difficult, because the head is both a small and a moving target. It takes a practiced shooter who is familiar with his weapon to kill so efficiently.

Despite a reward of $100,000 and police interviews of 1,800 people (including Ryan Erickson), for almost two years the case remained unsolved.

During this time (on September 16, 2003) Erickson was reassigned to Our Lady of Sorrows in Ladysmith, Wisconsin, as assistant pastor. The head pastor at the church (Rev. John Anderson), complained to his Bishop (Fliss) that Erickson drank. When Anderson confronted and reprimanded Erickson for spending "the weekend partying on Beer Can Island, a teenage hangout", Erickson replied that he had not been a priest that weekend. On August 10, 2004, Erickson was transferred to St. Mary's of the Seven Dolors church, in Hurley, Wisconsin 200 miles northeast of Hudson.

== Investigation, suicide, and ruling ==
Investigation

Erickson did not become a suspect, and was not interviewed by police until November 2004, when detectives Jeffrey Knopps and Shawn Pettee traveled from Hudson to Hurley to interview Erickson about the sexual assaults they had heard about from a male student from North Dakota and former associate of Erickson whom Knopps had interviewed. The detectives asked Erickson how Daniel O'Connell and James Ellison were killed. Erickson replied:

I think James was going through a door and out a door? And Dan was behind his desk. I think that’s what I, that’s what I, I mean, if I had to say what took place, I would say James was at the door and, and Dan was at the desk.

While Erickson claimed he knew this information from the news, these were details that had not been publicly disclosed by police so that they could be used to both "test false confessions and to determine who knows things only the perpetrator would know".

After police interviewed Erickson, Russell Lundgren, a Deacon at St. Mary's, was told by the priest, "'I done it and they were going to catch me'. He was staring out the window. Throughout the whole conversation, we never made eye contact." According to other testimony by Lundgren at a 2 October post-suicide judicial inquiry hearing, Erickson was worried about prison, saying "Do you know what they do with young guys in prison, especially priests?" (Lundgren had told other church staff about this remark but "did not tell police until after the suicide".)

Suicide

Because Erickson had revealed information to the detectives "about the crime scene that had not been made public", they interviewed him again the next month. During this December 7, interview they confronted him with "discrepancies in his remarks about the murders". Two days later, investigators "executed a search warrant on his living quarters, looking for evidence that would connect him to the murders." Investigators discovered a deeply hidden folder containing more than 40 images of prepubescent child sexual abuse material and gay male pornography on Erickson's computer, created on August 26, 2004, and last accessed December 12, 2004, shortly before Erickson’s suicide. On December 19 Erickson hanged himself in the hallway of St. Mary's. His body was discovered by the church janitor and Richard Reams, a parishioner.

Hearing

A "John Doe" proceeding (Note: "The John Doe proceeding is an institution sanctioned by long usage since Wisconsin’s territorial days. The provisions of Wis. Stat. section 968.26 currently define the scope of a John Doe proceeding in Wisconsin, which is intended as an independent, investigatory tool to ascertain whether a crime has been committed and if so, by whom." "The goal is to allow the judge to determine whether it appears probable from the testimony given that a crime has been committed, and whether to file a complaint. But the proceedings are also designed to protect innocent citizens from the fallout of frivolous prosecutions.") was held at the request of the family of Daniel O'Connell. On October 3, 2005, St. Croix District Attorney Eric Johnson presented the evidence to St. Croix County Judge Eric Lundell on the murders. Fifteen witnesses testified and other evidence was presented. As the defendant was deceased, the hearing took place without a jury. Judge Lundell stated “I find that and conclude that Ryan Erickson probably committed these crimes in question. On a scale of one to ten as far as strength of evidence I would consider this ten. It is a very strong case for circumstantial evidence”. Erickson's attorney and parents refused to attend the hearing, and deny his guilt. D.A. Eric Johnson explained that even though "the evidence was not cross-examined and was not heard by a jury", the judge's ruling "can be construed as a finding of guilt."

=== Aftermath ===
In notes left to family and friends, Erickson denied that he had killed "anyone", but also wrote, "my ego, my pride, my lust, my envy have always stopped me from being the best person I could be. I am tired."

In reply to written questions about Erickson, former bishop Raphael Fliss stated, "The diocese [of Superior] did not learn of any improper sexual behavior by Erickson until Dec. 17, 2004, when Hudson police officers, during their investigation, informed the diocese of allegations that Erickson sexually molested a minor while a priest and had pornographic files on his computer." Leon Podles points out that although the diocese of Superior knew that Erickson had "admitted to incidents of sexual abuse" and had been accused of abuse before and while he was in the seminary, they had not included him on the list of accused priests "in its own audit" or the John Jay School of Criminal Justice list of sexual abusers "because the incidents and accusations did not occur when Erickson was a priest". He notes that O'Connell's family complained that no one from the diocese called O'Connell's widow to offer condolences or apologies. Reportedly, "the only member of the clergy to call on the widow in the three and a half years after the murder was Ryan Erickson, the murderer."
