= Catholic Herald (disambiguation) =

Catholic Herald is a London-based Catholic monthly newspaper and magazine.

Catholic Herald may also refer to:

- The Arlington Catholic Herald, of the Diocese of Arlington
- Catholic News Herald, of the Diocese of Charlotte
- Hawaii Catholic Herald, of the Diocese of Honolulu
- The Superior Catholic Herald, of the Diocese of Superior

== See also ==
- Herald Malaysia, a Catholic newspaper in Malaysia
