= Joseph Maria Koudelka =

Czech-born prelate

His Excellency, The Right Reverend Joseph Maria Koudelka
- Bishop of Superior
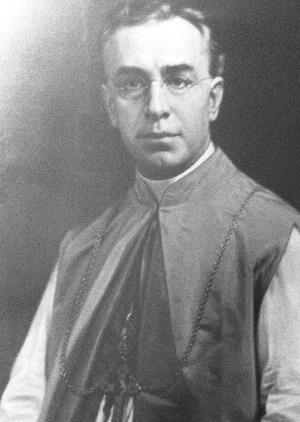
- Bishop Koudelka, November, 1913
- Church: Roman Catholic Church
- See: Bishop of Superior
- In office: November 5, 1913 – June 24, 1921
- Predecessor: Augustine Francis Schinner
- Successor: Joseph Gabriel Pinten
- Other posts: Auxiliary Bishop of Cleveland; 1907–1911; Auxiliary Bishop of Milwaukee; 1911–1913

Orders
- Ordination: November 29, 1875 by Tobias Mullen
- Consecration: November 9, 1907 by Ignatius Frederick Horstmann

Personal details
- Born: December 7, 1852 Chlistov, Bohemia, Austrian Empire (now the Czech Republic)
- Died: June 24, 1921 (aged 68) Superior, Wisconsin, US
- Buried: St. Mary Cemetery, Cleveland, Ohio, US
- Parents: Marek Koudelka; Anna Janoušková
- Education: St. Francis Seminary
- Motto: Omnibus omnia (All things to all people)

Joseph Maria Koudelka (December 7, 1852 – June 24, 1921) was a Czech-born prelate of the Roman Catholic Church who served as the second bishop of the Diocese of Superior in Wisconsin from 1913 until his death in 1921.

Koudelka previously served as an auxiliary bishop of the Diocese of Cleveland in Ohio from 1908 to 1911 and as an auxiliary bishop of the Archdiocese of Milwaukee in Wisconsin from 1911 to 1913.

== Biography ==
=== Early life ===
Joseph Koudelka was born on December 7, 1852, to Markus and Anna Jonoushek Koudelka at Chlistov, Bohemia in the Austrian Empire. He attended college at Klatovy in Bohemia. In 1868, his family emigrated to the United States. In preparation for the priesthood, Koudelka attended St. Francis Seminary in Milwaukee, Wisconsin.

=== Priesthood ===
Koudelka was ordained to the priesthood for the Diocese of Cleveland on November 29, 1875, by Bishop Tobias Mullen He was ordained under a special dispensation due to a pressing need for a Czech-speaking pastor at St. Procop's Parish in that city. In 1882, Koudelka was transferred to St. Louis, Missouri, for one year to edit Klas (The Voice), a Czech-language Catholic newspaper. Koudelka returned to Cleveland in 1883 to found St. Michael the Archangel Parish in that city and serve as its pastor.

=== Auxiliary Bishop of Cleveland ===
On November 29, 1907, Pope Pius X appointed Koudelka as an auxiliary bishop of Cleveland. He was consecrated by Bishop Ignatius Frederick Horstmann on February 25, 1908, with a special ministry to the Slavic community.

=== Auxiliary Bishop of Milwaukee ===
On June 24, 1911, Pius X appointed Koudelka as the first auxiliary bishop of Milwaukee. He was ordained on September 4, 1911. In a 1912 trip to Rome, Koudelka had a private meeting with the pope.

=== Bishop of Superior ===
On August 6, 1913, Pope Pius X appointed Koudelka the second bishop of Superior. He was installed at the pro-cathedral of Sacred Heart in Superior, Wisconsin by Archbishop Sebastian Messmer

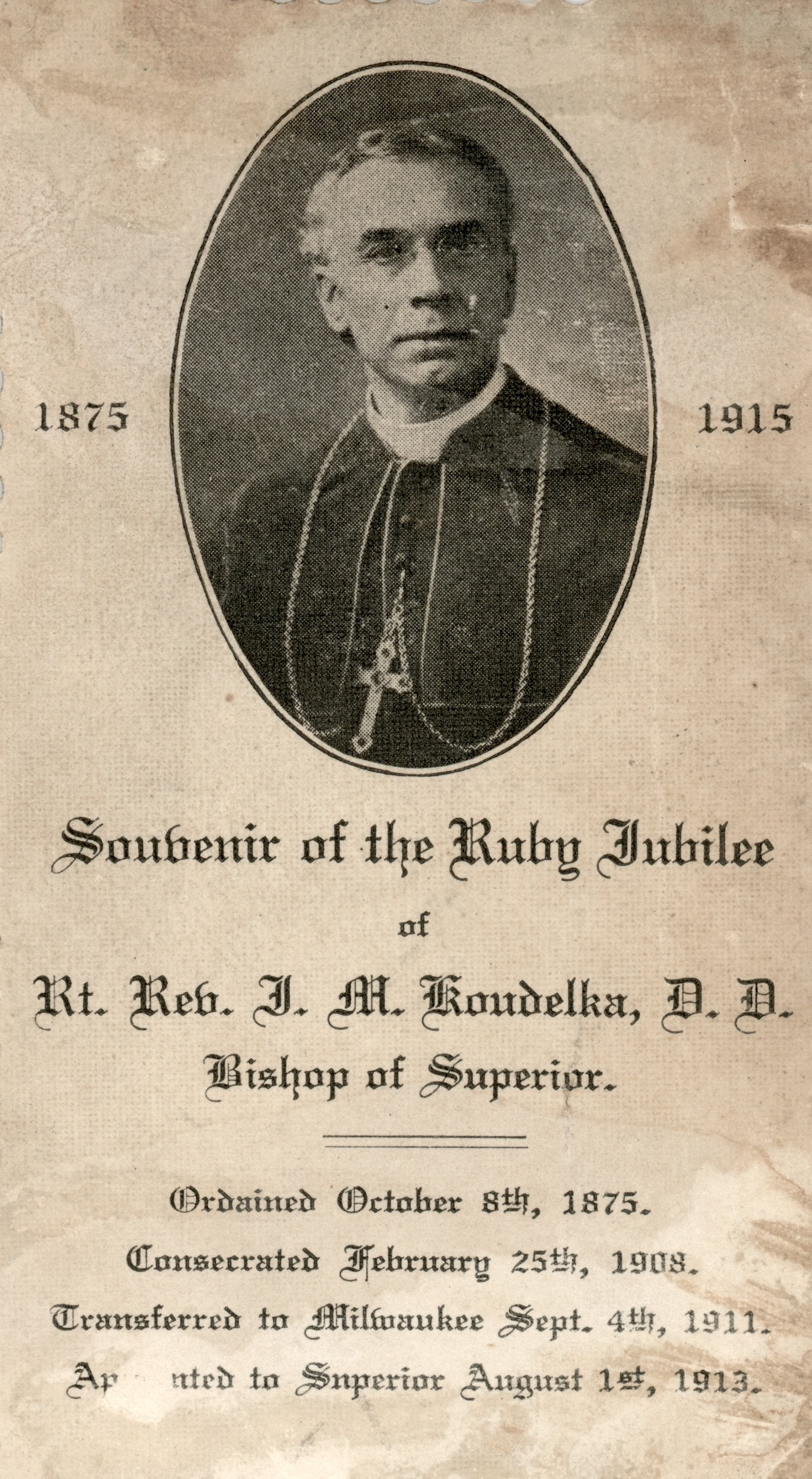
A souvenir from Bishop Koudelka's Ruby Jubilee

In 1912, Koudelka ordained Philip B. Gordon, the first Ojibwa priest and the second Native American Catholic priest in the country. Fluent in eight languages, Koudelka authored books in Czech, German and English. As bishop, he also learned to speak the Ojibwe language. He commissioned works of art for several church properties.

Koudelka created the Catholic Charities Bureau in Superior.In 1917, he dedicated St. Joseph's Children's Home in Superior, an orphanage that housed up to 200 children. He conducted over 100 parish missions around the country and contributed donations to help finance the orphanage.

In 1918, during World War I, the US Department of Justice (DOJ) investigated Koudelka; some priests had accused him of being pro-German. Two DOJ investigators interviewed him in Superior. After speaking with Koudelka and viewing some of his writings that supported US involvement in the war, the investigators concluded that these suspicions were groundless.

=== Death and legacy ===
Joseph Koudelka died on June 24, 1921, at his residence in Superior. The funeral mass was celebrated at the chapel of St. Joseph's Children's Home by his nephew, Reverend Charles Koudelka of Cleveland. The next day, a solemn burial mass was held at Sacred Heart Pro-Cathedral. Final services were at St. Michael Church in Cleveland, where he was pastor, with burial at St. Mary Cemetery.

== See also ==
- Catholic Church hierarchy
- Catholic Church in the United States
- Historical list of the Catholic bishops of the United States
- List of Catholic bishops of the United States
- Lists of patriarchs, archbishops, and bishops

Catholic Church titles
Preceded by Augustine Francis Schinner	Bishop of Superior; 1913–1921	Succeeded by Joseph G. Pinten
Preceded by None	Auxiliary Bishop of Milwaukee; 1911–1913	Succeeded by –
Preceded by –	Auxiliary Bishop of Cleveland; 1907–1911	Succeeded by –
