= James Patrick Powers =

His Excellency, The Most Reverend James Patrick Powers
- Bishop of Superior
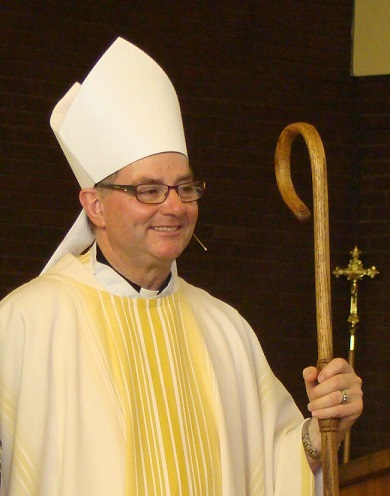
- Church: Catholic Church
- Diocese: Superior
- Appointed: December 15, 2015
- Installed: February 18, 2016
- Predecessor: Peter F. Christensen

Orders
- Ordination: May 20, 1990 by Raphael Michael Fliss
- Consecration: February 18, 2016 by Jerome E. Listecki, Peter F. Christensen, and Paul D. Etienne

Personal details
- Born: James Patrick Powers; February 6, 1953 (age 73) Baldwin, Wisconsin, US
- Denomination: Catholic Church
- Education: Holy Redeemer College; College of St. Thomas; St. John Vianney Seminary; Saint Paul Seminary; Saint Paul University
- Motto: Deduc me, Domine, luce tua (Lead me, Lord, in your light)

Styles of James Patrick Powers
- Reference style: His Excellency; The Most Reverend
- Spoken style: Your Excellency
- Religious style: Bishop

James Patrick Powers (born February 6, 1953) is an American prelate of the Roman Catholic Church, serving as the bishop of the Diocese of Superior in Wisconsin since 2016.

== Biography ==
=== Early life ===
James Powers was born in Baldwin, Wisconsin, on February 6, 1953. His parents, Thomas and Frances Roberta (Bobbie) Powers, ran a farm in Hammond, Wisconsin. James Powers had six siblings. He attended grade school and St. Croix Central High School in Hammond.

After his high school graduation, Powers attended Holy Redeemer College in Waterford, Wisconsin, the College of St. Thomas in St. Paul, Minnesota, and St. John Vianney Seminary in St. Paul where he received a Bachelor of Arts degree in theology. He then attended Saint Paul Seminary in Minnesota for his Master of Divinity.

=== Priesthood ===
Powers was ordained a priest of the Diocese of Superior on May 20, 1990, at Immaculate Conception Church in Hammond by Bishop Raphael Michael Fliss. After his ordination, the diocese assigned Powers to positions in the following Wisconsin parishes:

- Associate pastor of St. Joseph in Rice Lake (1990 to 1993)
- Parochial administrator of St. Bridget in River Falls, of St. John the Baptist in Webster, Sacred Hearts of Jesus and Mary in Crescent Lake and Our Lady of Perpetual Help in Danbury (1993 to 1994)
- Pastor of St. Bridget in River Falls

In 1996, Powers left St. Bridget to enter Saint Paul University in Ottawa, Canada, where he was awarded his Licentiate of Canon Law. Returning to Wisconsin in 1998, he served as pastor of the following three parishes:

- St. Pius X in Solon Springs
- St. Mary in Minong
- of St. Anthony of Padua in Gordon

Powers then served as pastor of St. Joseph for 11 years. At the end of this period, three other parishes were clustered with St. Joseph, with Powers as pastor of the cluster. Powers also served as spiritual director for Teens Encounter Christ (TEC), as a member of the St. Pius priest fund board and a member of the priest personnel placement board and the presbyteral council. In 1998, Bishop Raphael Michael Fliss appointed Powers as adjutant judicial vicar and in 2010 as vicar general.

=== Bishop of Superior ===
Powers was appointed by Pope Francis as bishop of Superior on December 15, 2015. He was consecrated on February 18, 2016, at the Cathedral of Christ the King in Superior, Wisconsin, by Archbishop Jerome E. Listecki, with Bishop Peter F. Christensen and Archbishop Paul D. Etienne serving as co-consecrators.

== See also ==
- Catholic Church hierarchy
- Catholic Church in the United States
- Historical list of the Catholic bishops of the United States
- List of Catholic bishops of the United States
- Lists of patriarchs, archbishops, and bishops

Catholic Church titles
| Preceded by Peter F. Christensen | Bishop of Superior; 2016–Present | Succeeded by Incumbent |
