= Saint John Vianney Seminary (Minnesota) =

Catholic seminary in St. Paul, Minnesota, United States

Coordinates: 44.9456°N 93.1890°W

Saint John Vianney College Seminary
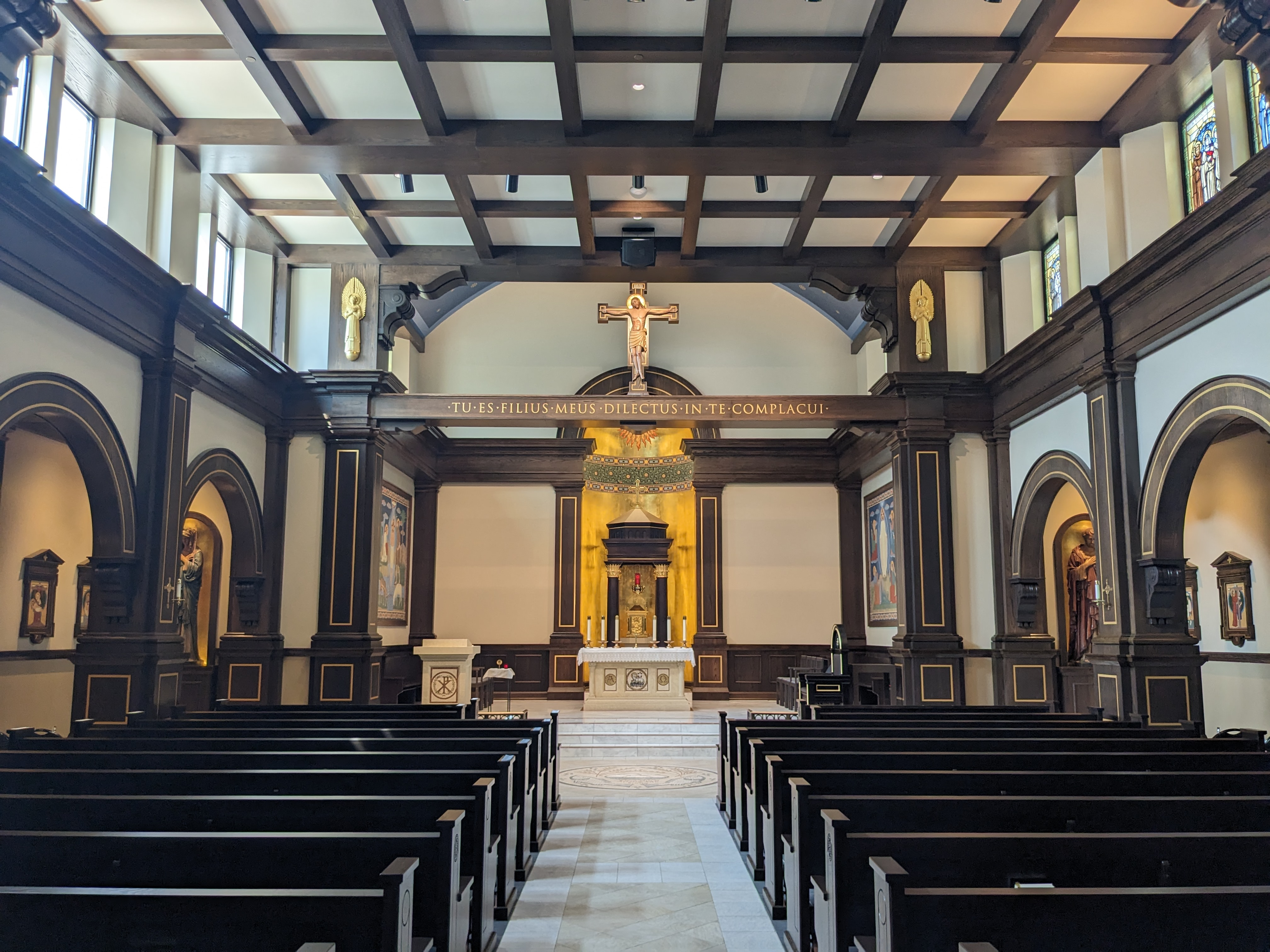
- The Chapel at Saint John Vianney College Seminary
- Motto: Men in Christ. Men of the Church. Men for Others.
- Type: Private; Diocesan Seminary; Minor Seminary
- Established: 1968
- Affiliations: ATS
- Religious affiliation: Catholic Church
- President: Archbishop Bernard Hebda
- Vice-president: Very Rev. Jonathan Kelly
- Rector: Very Rev. Jonathan Kelly
- Students: 100
- Location: 2110 Selby Avenue, St. Paul, Minnesota, St. Paul, MN, United States
- Campus: Suburban
- Sponsoring diocese: Archdiocese of Saint Paul and Minneapolis
- Mailing address: 2115 Summit Avenue, Mail #5024, St. Paul, MN 55105
- Nickname: SJV
- Mascot: Jax
- Website: sjvseminary.org

Saint John Vianney College Seminary (SJV) is the largest Catholic college seminary in the United States, located on the campus of the University of St. Thomas in St. Paul, Minnesota, representing 18 dioceses throughout the nation with more than 100 men in formation annually. Established in 1968, SJV nurtures the seeds of a priestly vocation, preparing young men for major seminary through integral formation and discipleship in Christian character, a traditional Catholic program of spiritual growth, and a formative liberal arts education. Over 750 alumni are serving as ordained priests today.

== History ==
=== Background ===
Prior to the founding of Saint John Vianney Seminary, students received their education in a "6-6" plan at Nazareth Hall Preparatory Seminary and the Saint Paul Seminary. Students would receive four years of high school education and two years of philosophy at Nazareth Hall, and two years of philosophy and four years of theology at the Saint Paul Seminary. In 1959, Archbishop William O. Brady ordered a feasibility study for a "4-4-4" plan for priestly formation: four years of study at Nazareth Hall, four years of study at the College of Saint Thomas, and four years of study at the Saint Paul Seminary. This plan was overwhelmingly supported. However, due to declining enrollment after the Second Vatican Council, by 1967 the 4-4-4 plan seemed no longer feasible and there was a stronger desire to create a college seminary at the University of St. Thomas and to close Nazareth Hall.

=== Establishment and Early Years ===
Saint John Vianney Seminary was thus founded in 1968. It initially existed in Loras Hall and Cretin Hall next to The Saint Paul Seminary, but the faculty of SPS were not pleased with the proximity the college seminary had to the major seminary. In 1972, the seminary residence moved to Brady Hall on campus of the College of St. Thomas. In January 1982, meetings were held to begin planning a separate dedicated building for the seminary. Groundbreaking for the new building took place in 1982. The new seminary building was constructed on the north campus of the University of St. Thomas, just northwest of Ireland Hall and east of Flynn Hall. The ground floor of the seminary has offices for the in-house priests and academic and administration staff, as well as guest rooms. A simple chapel was also constructed on the first floor.

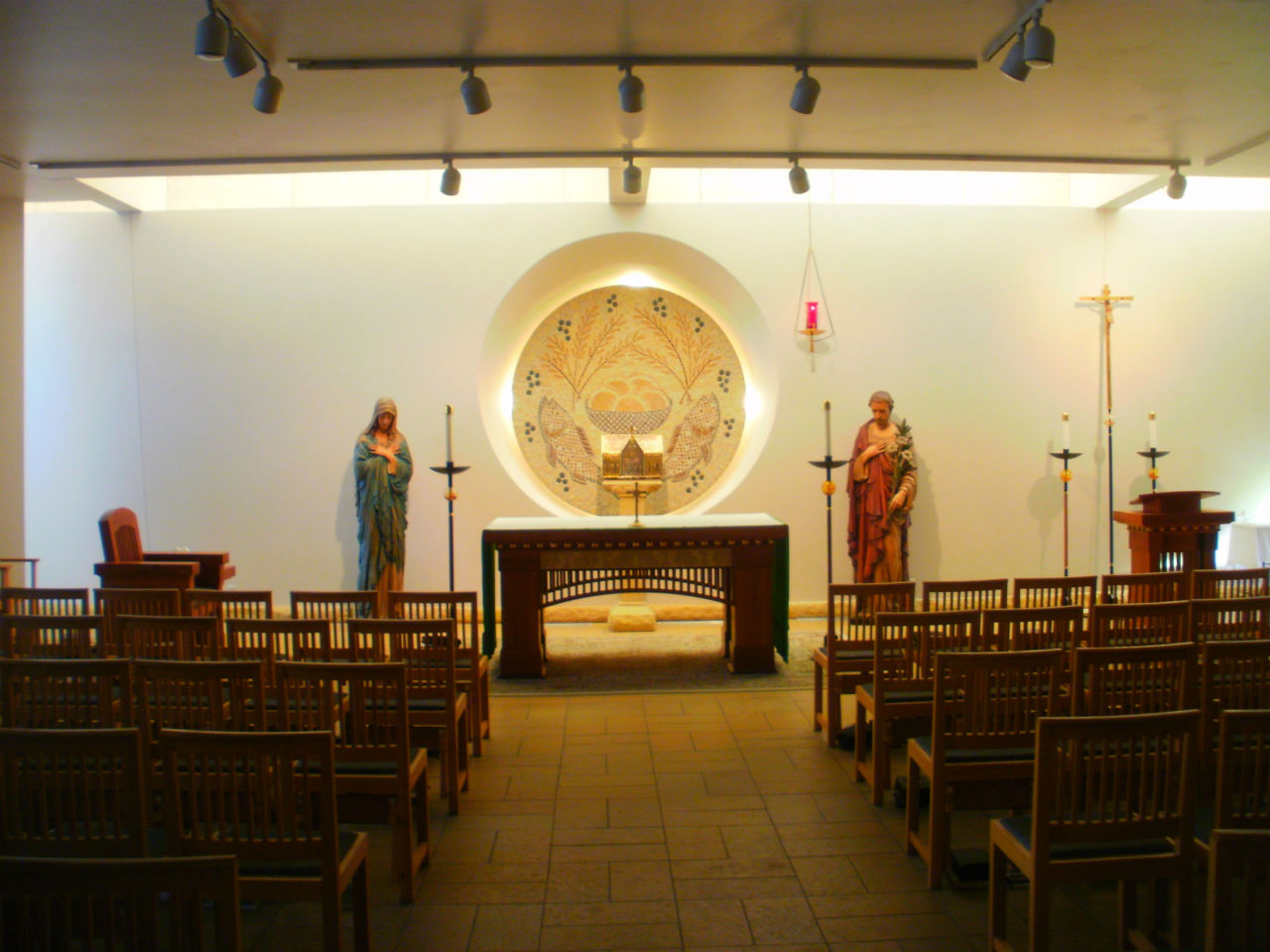
The original chapel

Four residence floors are above the ground floor.

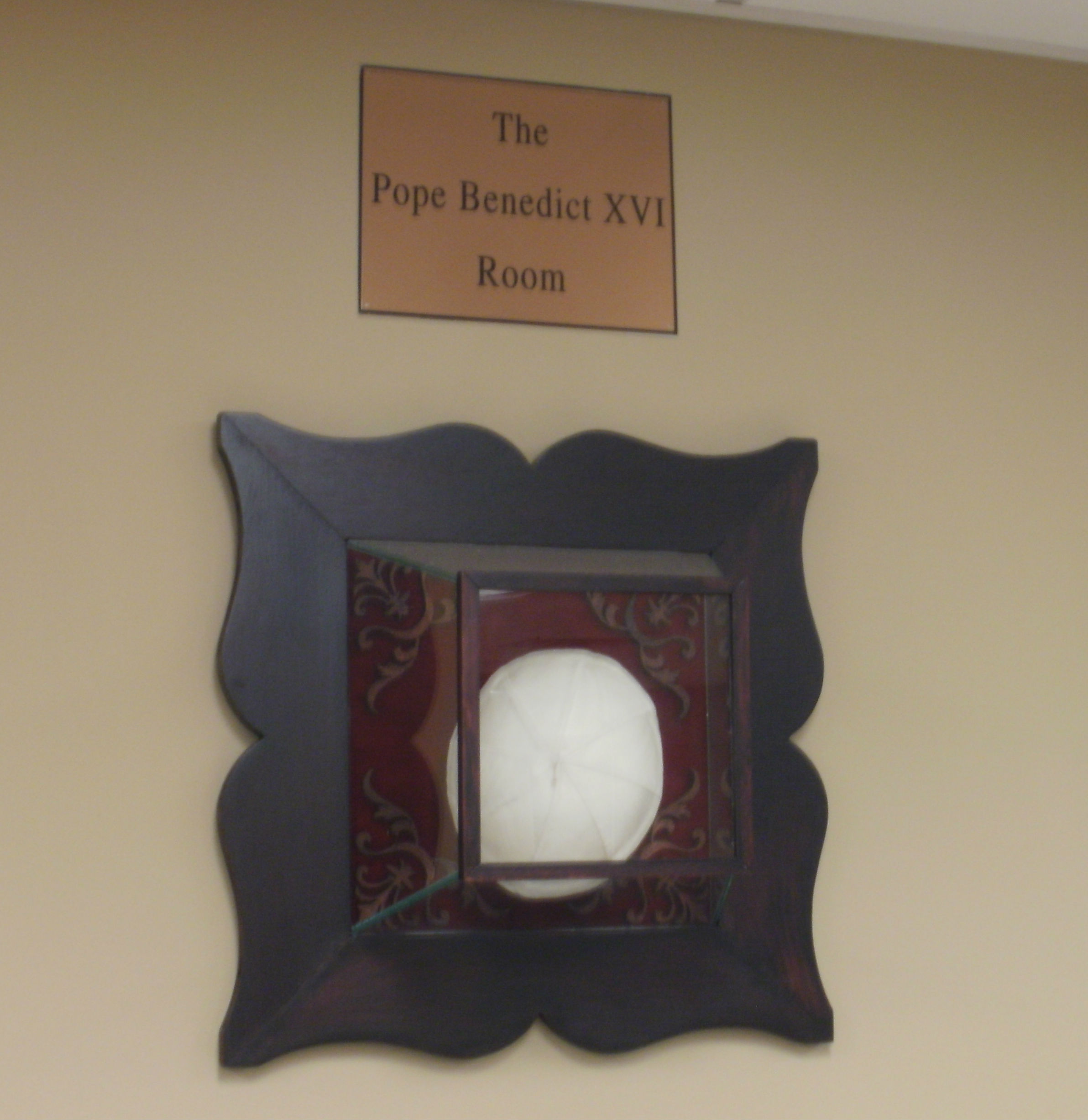
Zucchetto of Benedict XVI on display in Pope Benedict Room

The basement contains a recreation room, which was named the Pope Benedict XVI Room in the 2000s. Cardinal Ratzinger met with then-Rector Richard Pates in that room on a seminary visit in the 1970s. On display in the room is a zucchetto of Pope Benedict XVI, given to a seminarian from SJV who visited Rome and extended a new one to the Pope as he passed by; the Pontiff then exchanged the new one for his own.

=== 2000s ===
Enrollment throughout the 1980s and 1990s generally remained low. In 1999, Fr. Bill Baer was appointed rector and under his tenure, enrollment reached an all-time high.

In 2010, Fr. Michael Becker was appointed as rector. In 2013, the seminary was the largest college seminary in the United States with over 130 seminarians and 27 sponsoring dioceses. The seminarians at SJV represented about 10% of all college seminarians in the United States.

The current rector of the seminary, Fr. Jonathan Kelly, was appointed by Archbishop Bernard Hebda in 2020. In 2020, construction began on an addition which included a new chapel, additional guest rooms, priest suites, and a rooftop terrace. The renovations were completed in early 2023 and the chapel was dedicated on April 20, 2023.

== Student Life ==
=== Last Chance Mass ===
Last Chance Mass is an outreach offered by the seminary to the students of the University of St. Thomas and the surrounding community. Every Sunday night at 9:00 PM during the academic year, Mass is offered in the SJV chapel to the general public by a priest of SJV's formation staff with refreshments following. It was originally established for the football players of the University of St. Thomas.

=== Caruso's Crew ===
When Coach Glenn Caruso took over the University of St. Thomas football team in 2008, he approached the men at the seminary and asked them to come and cheer on the Tommies at football games, as not many people attended them due to their losing record. Since then, the men of SJV have been some of the most active fans for the football team, attending every home game. A subgroup of the seminarians, called "Caruso's Crew", dress up as hard hat workers and paint on faux moustaches. The crew carry large tools made of cardboard and duct tape (a hammer, saw, wrench, and lunch box). This group has been known to travel hundreds of miles to attend away games.

=== Sports ===
At times, students of the seminary have played on the University of Saint Thomas football team, including Jordan Roberts, a Division One transfer.

Students yearly play in the Rector's Bowl, a flag football game against The Saint Paul Seminary.

== Rectors ==
- Bishop John Roach (1968–1971)
- Fr. Kenneth J. Pierre (1971–1981)
- Bishop Richard Pates (1981–1987)
- Fr. Kevin McDonough (1987–1990)
- Fr. Dale J. Korogi (1990–1992)
- Bishop Peter F. Christensen (1992–1999)
- Fr. William J. Baer (1999–2010)
- Fr. Michael Becker (2010–2020)
- Fr. Jonathan Kelly (2020–Present)

== Notable alumni ==
- Cardinal Blase Joseph Cupich of Chicago
- Archbishop Paul Dennis Etienne of Seattle
- Bishop John Francis Doerfler of Marquette, Michigan
- Bishop Donald DeGrood of Sioux Falls
- Bishop Michael Izen
- Bishop James Powers of Superior, Wisconsin
- Archbishop Alexander Sample of Portland
- Judge John M. Sandy of the Iowa Court of Appeals

== Sponsoring Dioceses ==
- Archdiocese of Chicago
- Diocese of Des Moines
- Diocese of Duluth
- Diocese of Gaylord
- Diocese of Grand Rapids
- Diocese of Green Bay
- Diocese of Joliet-in-Illinois
- Diocese of Kalamazoo
- Diocese of Lafayette-in Indiana
- Diocese of La Crosse
- Diocese of Lansing
- Archdiocese of Mobile
- Archdiocese of Milwaukee
- Diocese of New Ulm
- Archdiocese of Oklahoma City
- Archdiocese of Omaha
- Diocese of Rockford
- Diocese of Saginaw
- Diocese of Saint Cloud
- Archdiocese of Saint Paul and Minneapolis
- Diocese of Sioux Falls
- Syro-Malabar Saint Thomas Diocese of Chicago

== See also ==
- St. John Vianney
