= The Superior Catholic Herald =

Catholic newspaper

- Format: Newspaper
- Owner: Diocese of Superior
- Founded: 1953
- Language: English
- Headquarters: Superior, Wisconsin
- Circulation: 12,000
- Website: superiorcatholicherald.org

The Superior Catholic Herald is a Catholic bi-weekly newspaper, and is the official publication of the Diocese of Superior. It was established as The Catholic Herald Citizen by Bishop Albert Meyer, starting in 1953.
