= Joseph G. Pinten =

American prelate (1867–1945)

His Excellency, The Most Reverend Joseph Gabriel Pinten
- Bishop of Superior; Titular Bishop of Sela
- Church: Roman Catholic Church
- See: Diocese of Superior
- In office: May 3, 1922 – October 25, 1926
- Predecessor: Joseph Maria Koudelka
- Successor: Theodore H. Reverman
- Other posts: Bishop of Grand Rapids; October 28, 1926 – November 1, 1940

Orders
- Ordination: November 1, 1890 by Lucido Parocchi
- Consecration: May 3, 1922 by Sebastian Gebhard Messmer

Personal details
- Born: October 3, 1867 Rockland Township, Michigan, US
- Died: November 6, 1945 (aged 78) Marquette, Michigan, US
- Buried: Holy Cross Cemetery
- Parents: Joseph and Anna (Kloekner) Pinten
- Education: St. Francis Seminary; Propaganda Fide
- Motto: Spiritus domini super me (The spirit of the Lord is upon me)

Joseph Gabriel Pinten (October 3, 1867 – November 6, 1945) was an American prelate of the Roman Catholic Church. He served as the third bishop of the Diocese of Superior in Wisconsin (1922–1926), and as the fourth bishop of the Diocese of Grand Rapids in Michigan (1926–1940).

== Biography ==
=== Early years ===
Joseph Pinten was born on October 3, 1867, in Rockland, Michigan, the son of Joseph and Anna Pinten. He grew up in Calumet, Michigan. In 1881, deciding to become a priest, Pinten entered Saint Francis de Sales Seminary in St. Francis, Wisconsin. Pinten traveled to Rome in 1885 to attend the Propaganda Fide University in Rome.

=== Priesthood ===
Pinten was ordained to the priesthood by Cardinal Lucido Parocchi on November 1, 1890, at Trinità dei Monti Church in Rome for the Diocese of Sault Sainte Marie-Marquette. After returning to Michigan, the diocese assigned Pinten as an assistant pastor at St. Paul's Parish in Negaunee, Michigan, in 1892 and then assistant pastor of St. Fidelis Parish in Detour, Michigan. Pinten spent 1893 on medical leave, then had the following parish assignments in Michigan:

- Administrator at St Fidelis in Gladstone (1894)
- Pastor at Holy Rosary (Assumption) in Iron Mountain (1894 to 1895)
- Pastor at St. Barbara's in Vulcan (1895 to 1898)
- Pastor at St. Joseph's in L'Anse (1898)
- Rector at St. Peter's Cathedral in Marquette (1899)

In 1912, Bishop Frederick Eis named Pinten as his vicar general. Later that year Pope Pius X designated him as a domestic prelate. Pinten directed the construction of Holy Family Orphan's Home in Marquette, and headed the orphanage from 1916 to 1922. In 1919, Pinten used his own funds to purchase the former dormitory property of Northern Normal College in Marquette, Michigan. Pinten then donated it to the diocese to use as a church, requiring it be named Saint Michael and that it would have a parish school.

=== Bishop of Superior ===
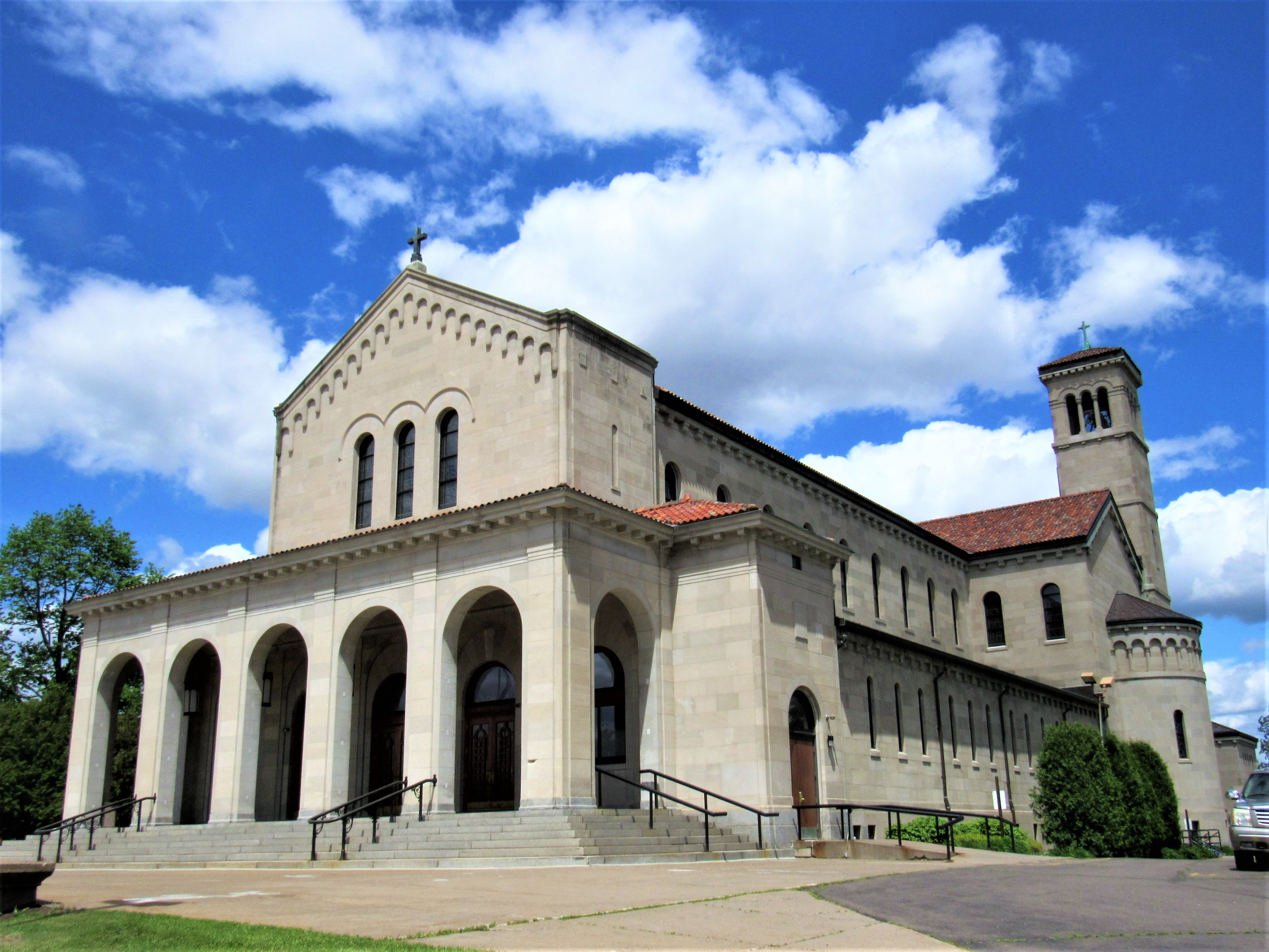
Cathedral of Christ the King, Superior, Wisconsin (2017)

On November 30, 1921, Pope Benedict XV appointed Pinten as the third bishop of Superior. He was ordained bishop on May 3, 1922, at St. Peter Cathedral with Archbishop Sebastian Messmer presiding. The next day, an enthronement ceremony was held at Sacred Heart Pro-Cathedral in Superior, Wisconsin.

After his arrival in Superior, Pinten purchased a home for himself. When he learned that a local community of sisters was living in an overcrowded residence, he remodeled the house and quietly turned it over to them. He oversaw numerous building and expansion projects throughout the diocese.

Ground breaking for the new cathedral began on June 23, 1926. In his last act as bishop of Superior, Pinten blessed and laid the cornerstone for the Cathedral of Christ the King in Superior on October 24, 1926. The next day he left for his new appointment at Grand Rapids.

=== Bishop of Grand Rapids ===
On June 25, 1926, Pope Pius XI appointed Pinten as the fourth bishop of Grand Rapids. He was installed there on October 28, 1926.

=== Death and legacy ===
On November 1, 1940, Pope Pius XII accepted Pinten's resignation as bishop of Superior and appointed him as titular bishop of Sela. In poor health after his retirement, Joseph Pinten moved back to Marquette, Michigan, where he died at St. Mary's Hospital on November 6, 1945.

== See also ==
- Catholic Church hierarchy
- Catholic Church in the United States
- Historical list of the Catholic bishops of the United States
- List of Catholic bishops of the United States
- Lists of patriarchs, archbishops, and bishops

Catholic Church titles
Preceded by Bishop Joseph Casimir Plagens	Bishop of Grand Rapids; 1926–1940	Succeeded by Bishop Edward Denis Kelly
Preceded by Joseph Maria Koudelka	Bishop of Superior; 1922–1926	Succeeded by Theodore H. Reverman
