= George Albert Hammes =

American Catholic bishop (1911–1993)

His Excellency, The Most Reverend George Albert Hammes
- Bishop of Superior
- Church: Catholic Church
- Diocese: Diocese of Superior
- Appointed: March 28, 1960
- In office: May 24, 1960—June 27, 1985
- Predecessor: Joseph John Annabring
- Successor: Raphael Michael Fliss
- Previous post: Chancellor, Diocese of La Crosse

Orders
- Ordination: May 22, 1937 by William Richard Griffin
- Consecration: May 24, 1960 by Egidio Vagnozzi

Personal details
- Born: September 11, 1911 St. Joseph, Wisconsin, US
- Died: April 11, 1993 (aged 81) La Crosse, Wisconsin, US
- Buried: Calvary Cemetery, Superior
- Denomination: Catholic Church
- Parents: August and Caroline (Schumacher) Hammes
- Motto: Pax Christi (Peace of Christ)

George Albert Hammes (September 11, 1911 – April 11, 1993) was an American bishop in the Roman Catholic Church. He served as bishop of Superior in Wisconsin from 1960 to 1985.

== Biography ==
=== Early life ===
George Hammes was born on September 11, 1911 in St. Joseph, Wisconsin to August and Caroline (Schumacher) Hammes. After graduating from eighth grade at St. Joseph Ridge School in 1925, Hammes decided to become a priest. He entered St. Lawrence Seminary in Mount Calvary, Wisconsin, then progressed to the St. Louis Preparatory Seminary in St. Louis, Missouri, to study philosophy. Two years later, Hammes entered Kenrick Seminary in St. Louis. He finished his education at the Sulpician Seminary at the Catholic University of America in Washington, D.C.

=== Priesthood ===
Hammes was ordained to the priesthood for the Diocese of La Crosse on May 22, 1937, at the Cathedral of St. Joseph the Workman in La Crosse, Wisconsin, by Bishop William Richard Griffin. After his ordination, Bishop Alexander McGavick assigned Hammes as his personal secretary and as a teacher of religion at Aquinas High School in La Crosse. He was also tasked with teaching religion and ethics at St. Francis School of Nursing in La Crosse.

McGavick in 1944 named Hammes as chancellor of the diocese. The Vatican elevated him to the rank of domestic prelate in 1947. In 1957, 20 years after his ordination, Hammes received his first pastoral assignment as the founding pastor of St. Leo Parish in West Salem, Wisconsin.

=== Bishop of Superior ===
On March 28, 1960, Hammes was appointed bishop of Superior by Pope John XXIII. Hammes was consecrated at the Mary E. Sawyer Civic Auditorium in La Crosse on May 24, 1960. He was the first priest from La Crosse to be named a bishop.

During the early 1960s, Hammes attended all four sessions of the Second Vatican Council in Rome.In 1963, Hammes instituted the delivery of mass in the vernacular in the diocese and in 1969 requested that every parish in the diocese create a pastoral council. During the late 1960s, he was forced to close four Catholic high schools in the diocese due to falling enrollment

In 1979, Pope John Paul II appointed Reverend Raphael M. Fliss as coadjutor bishop of Superior to assist Hammes in his responsibilities. Hammes in 1980 established a permanent diaconate program in the diocese and in 1981 began an initiative to cluster parishes as an answer to the shortage of priests.

=== Retirement and death ===
On July 5,1985, Hammes retired as bishop of Superior. He died at St. Joseph's Nursing Home in La Crosse on April 11, 1993.

== See also ==
- Catholic Church hierarchy
- Catholic Church in the United States
- Historical list of the Catholic bishops of the United States
- List of Catholic bishops of the United States
- Lists of patriarchs, archbishops, and bishops

== Sources ==
- Fisher, Gerald Edward. Dusk is My Dawn:The First Hundred Years of the Diocese of La Crosse. La Crosse, Wis.: Diocese of La Crosse, 1969, p. 160.
- "Msgr. Hammes Bishop-Elect of Superior". Aquinas News, La Crosse, Wisconsin, April 29, 1960, vol. 29, no. 8, p. 1.

Catholic Church titles
Preceded by Joseph John Annabring	Bishop of Superior; 1960–1985	Succeeded by Raphael Michael Fliss
