= Peter F. Christensen =

American prelate in Idaho

His Excellency, The Most Reverend Peter Forsyth Christensen
- Bishop of Boise
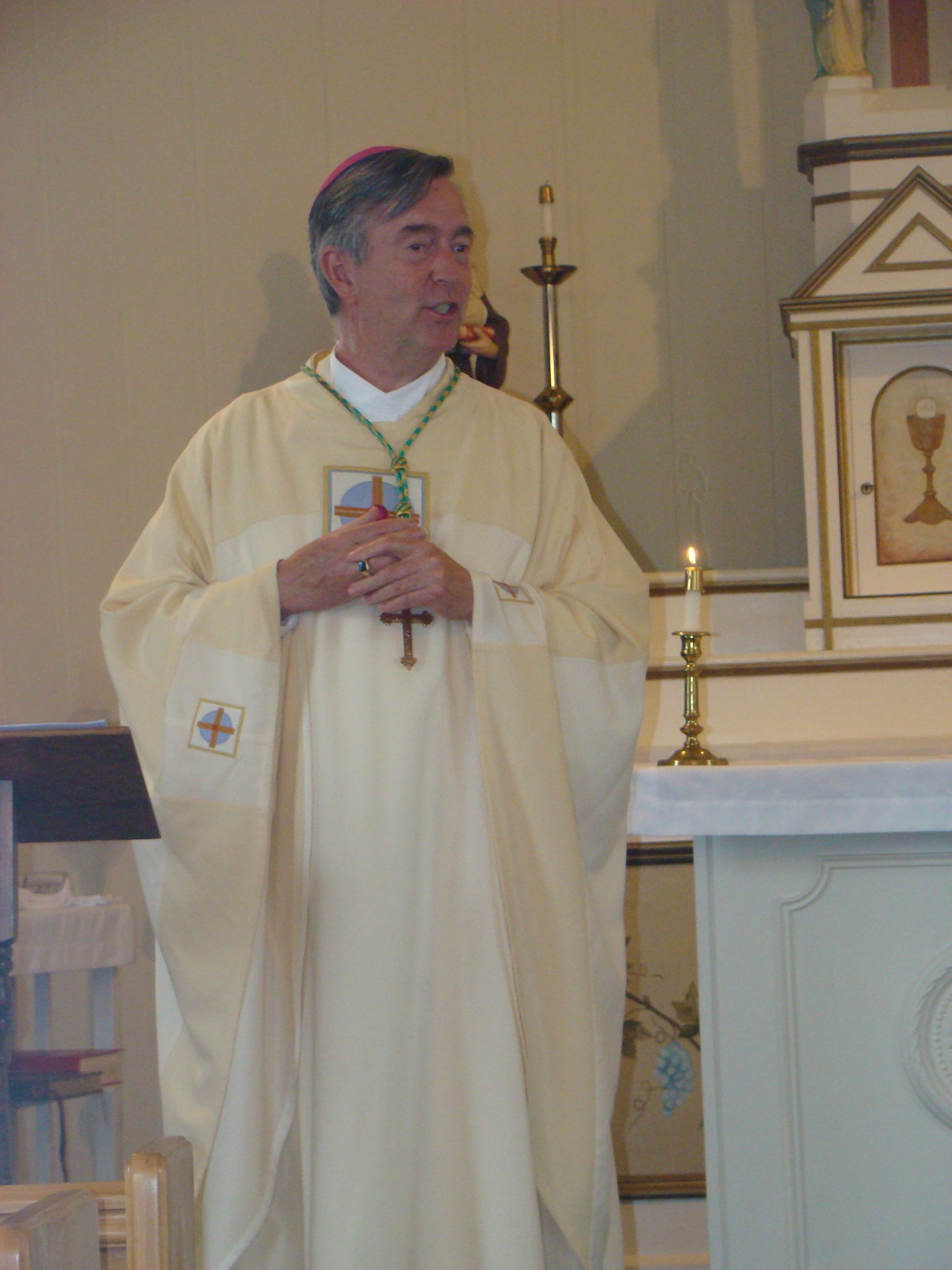
- Church: Catholic Church
- Diocese: Boise
- Appointed: November 4, 2014
- Installed: December 17, 2014
- Predecessor: Michael Patrick Driscoll
- Previous post: Bishop of Superior (2007–2014)

Orders
- Ordination: May 25, 1985 by John Roach
- Consecration: September 14, 2007 by Harry Joseph Flynn, Raphael Michael Fliss, and William Henry Bullock

Personal details
- Born: December 24, 1952 (age 73) Altadena, California
- Denomination: Catholic Church
- Residence: Boise, Idaho
- Parents: Robert and Ann (née Forsyth) Christensen
- Occupation: Catholic bishop
- Education: University of St. Thomas, and Saint Paul Seminary School of Divinity
- Motto: Tu es Christus filius Dei vivi (You are the Christ, the son of the living God)

Styles of Peter Forsyth Christensen
- Reference style: His Excellency; The Most Reverend
- Spoken style: Your Excellency
- Religious style: Bishop

Peter Forsyth Christensen (born December 24, 1952) is an American prelate of the Roman Catholic Church who has been serving as bishop of the Diocese of Boise in Idaho since 2014. He previously served as bishop of the Diocese of Superior in Wisconsin from 2007 to 2014.

Christensen was ordained into the priesthood on May 25, 1985, by Archbishop John Roach. On November 4, 2014, Pope Francis named Christensen as the eighth bishop in the Diocese of Boise. He was installed as bishop by Archbishop Harry Flynn in Boise on December 17, 2014, at St. John's Cathedral.

== Biography ==
=== Early life and education ===
Peter Christensen was born on December 24, 1952, in Altadena, California. He was the fourth of eight children; his parents were Robert and Ann (née Forsyth) Christensen. The family later moved to Palos Verdes, California. Christensen attended Palos Verdes High School, with interests in becoming a potter.

Christensen briefly attended the College of the Redwoods in Eureka, California, but dropped out in 1975 to move with his mother and siblings to Minneapolis-Saint Paul, Minnesota. Christensen enrolled at the University of St. Thomas in that area, obtaining a Bachelor of Art degree in history degree. After graduation, Christensen worked as a graphic designer.

After deciding to become a priest, Christensen in 1981 entered Saint Paul Seminary in St. Paul, Minnesota. During his seminary education, he studied in Israel for a semester. He graduated with a Master of Divinity degree from Saint Paul Seminary.

=== Ordination and ministry ===
Christensen was ordained to the priesthood for the Archdiocese of Minneapolis-St. Paul by Archbishop John Roach on May 25, 1985. After his ordination, the archdiocese assigned Christensen as assistant pastor of St. Olaf Parish in Minneapolis. He left St. Olaf in 1989 to become spiritual director of St. John Vianney College Seminary in St. Paul.

After receiving a Master of Applied Spirituality degree, Christensen became rector of St. John Vianney. During his tenure, St. John Vianney became the largest Catholic college seminary in the United States. In June 1999, Christensen was appointed pastor of Nativity of Our Lord Parish in St. Paul, where he continued traditional practices, such as perpetual Eucharistic adoration. He also reconstructed the church and rectory.

=== Bishop of Superior ===
On June 28, 2007, Pope Benedict XVI named Christensen as bishop of Superior. After receiving a telephone call from Archbishop Pietro Sambi bringing news of his appointment, he "sobbed for about 15 minutes as he had not sought the episcopal office."

During a press conference, Christensen promised to be a "good listener" in his new role as bishop. He was consecrated at the Cathedral of Saint Paul in St. Paul on September 14, 2007, by Archbishop Harry Flynn, with Bishops Raphael Fliss, and William Bullock serving as co-consecrators.

=== Bishop of Boise ===
On November 4, 2014, Pope Francis named Christensen as the eighth bishop of the Diocese of Boise. He was installed on December 17, 2014, in the Cathedral of St. John the Evangelist in Boise, Idaho.

On February 2, 2017, police arrested Reverend Thomas Faucher, a retired priest, for possessing and distributing child pornography. Surprised by the announcement, Christensen immediately suspended Faucher from priestly ministry. He later pleaded guilty to charges and was sentenced to 25 years in prison. The Congregation for the Doctrine of the Faith at the Vatican defrocked Faucher in December 2019. Christensen made this statement: “There are no excuses for such behavior by any one of our clergy."

In April 2020, Christensen issued a memo containing orders for diocese priests, including an order banning them from celebrating mass ad orientem (facing the altar).

== Viewpoints ==
=== Euthanasia ===
Christensen in 2012 joined the other Wisconsin bishops in warning against the use of Physician (or Provider) Orders for Life-Sustaining Treatment (POLST). The bishops wrote to “encourage all Catholics to avoid using all such documents, programs and materials.”

=== Education ===
In January 2014, Christensen announced that the Diocese of Boise would not allow the use of the Common Core curriculum in its schools.

== See also ==
- Catholic Church hierarchy
- Catholic Church in the United States
- Historical list of the Catholic bishops of the United States
- List of Catholic bishops of the United States
- Lists of patriarchs, archbishops, and bishops

Catholic Church titles
Preceded by Michael Patrick Driscoll	Bishop of Boise; 2014–present	Succeeded by Incumbent
Preceded by Raphael Michael Fliss	Bishop of Superior; 2007–2014	Succeeded by James Patrick Powers
