= Raphael Michael Fliss =

American prelate

His Excellency, The Most Reverend Raphael Michael Fliss
- Bishop of Superior
- Church: Catholic Church
- Diocese: Diocese of Superior
- Appointed: December 20, 1979
- In office: June 27, 1985—June 28, 2007
- Predecessor: George Albert Hammes
- Successor: Peter F. Christensen
- Previous post: Rector St. John Cathedral, Milwaukee

Orders
- Ordination: May 26, 1956 by Albert Gregory Meyer
- Consecration: December 20, 1979 by George Albert Hammes

Personal details
- Born: October 25, 1930 Milwaukee, Wisconsin, U.S.
- Died: September 21, 2015 (aged 84)
- Denomination: Catholic Church
- Parents: Paul P. and Valeria (Kosobucki) Fliss
- Education: Catholic University of America, Lateran University
- Motto: Videte qudniam suavis est Dominus (See how sweet the Lord is)

Raphael Michael Gabriel Fliss (October 25, 1930 – September 21, 2015) was an American prelate of the Roman Catholic Church who served as bishop of the Diocese of Superior in Wisconsin from 1985 to 2007.

== Biography ==
=== Early life ===
Raphael Fliss was born in Milwaukee, Wisconsin on October 25, 1930, to Paul P. and Valeria (Kosobucki) Fliss. For primary school, he attended St. Hedwig School and St. Elizabeth School, both in Milwaukee. Deciding to become a priest, Fliss enrolled in the St. Francis minor seminary in Milwaukee, then continued at the major seminary at St. Francis. He received a Bachelor of Arts degree in 1952. Fliss then went to Washington, D.C. to attend the Catholic University of America, where he received a Licentiate in Theology in 1956.

=== Priesthood ===
Fliss was ordained on May 26, 1956 for the Archdiocese of Milwaukee by Cardinal Albert Gregory Meyer at the Cathedral of St. John the Evangelist in Milwaukee. After his ordination, the archdiocese assigned Fliss as a temporary assistant pastor of Christ the King Parish in Wauwatosa, Wisconsin. Later in 1956, he was transferred to the Cathedral of St. John Parish. Meyer eventually appointed Fliss as his personal secretary, as master of ceremonies and ultimately as assistant chancellor of the archdiocese.

Fliss returned to Rome to study canon law at the Pontifical Lateran University. He was awarded a Doctor of Canon Law degree in 1965. Fliss was named as vice chancellor in 1869. Fliss became rector of the Cathedral of St. John in 1979.

=== Coadjutor Bishop and Bishop of Superior ===
Pope John Paul II appointed Fliss as coadjutor bishop of Superior on November 6, 1979 to assist Bishop George Albert Hammes. Fliss was consecrated at the Cathedral of Christ the King in Superior, Wisconsin, by Hammes on December 20, 1979. Upon Hammes’s retirement, Fliss automatically succeeded him as bishop of Superior on June 27, 1985.

On June 28, 2007 Fliss retired as bishop of Superior. He died on September 21, 2015.

== See also ==
- Catholic Church hierarchy
- Catholic Church in the United States
- Historical list of the Catholic bishops of the United States
- List of Catholic bishops of the United States
- Lists of patriarchs, archbishops, and bishops

Catholic Church titles
Preceded by -	Bishop Emeritus of Superior; 2007–2015	Succeeded by -
Preceded by George Albert Hammes	Bishop of Superior; 1985–2007	Succeeded by Peter F. Christensen
