= Cathedral of Christ the King (Superior, Wisconsin) =

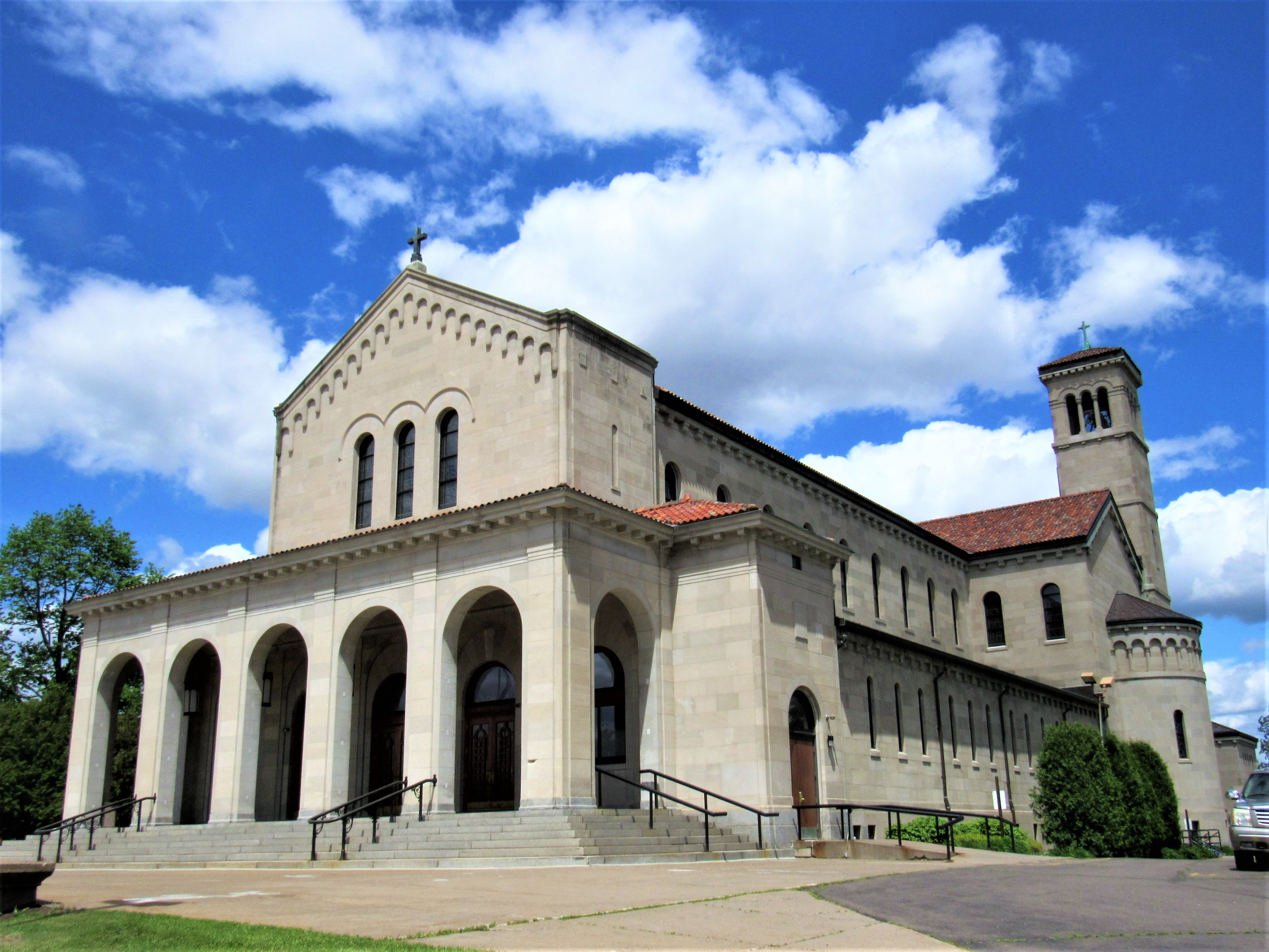

- Location within Wisconsin
- 46°43′14.25″N 92°05′39.34″W
- Location: 1111 Belknap St. Superior, Wisconsin
- Country: United States
- Denomination: Roman Catholic Church
- Website: www.superiorcathedral.org

History
- Status: Cathedral/Parish
- Founded: 1926
- Dedication: Christ the King

Architecture
- Style: Italianate
- Groundbreaking: June 24, 1926
- Completed: 1927
- Construction cost: $300,000

Specifications
- Materials: Limestone

Administration
- Diocese: Superior

Clergy
- Bishop: Most Rev. James Patrick Powers
- Rector: Rev. Andrew P. Ricci

The Cathedral of Christ the King is the mother church of the Roman Catholic Diocese of Superior in Superior, Wisconsin. It was named in honor of Christ the King. The building is located at 1111 Belknap Street in Superior.

== History ==
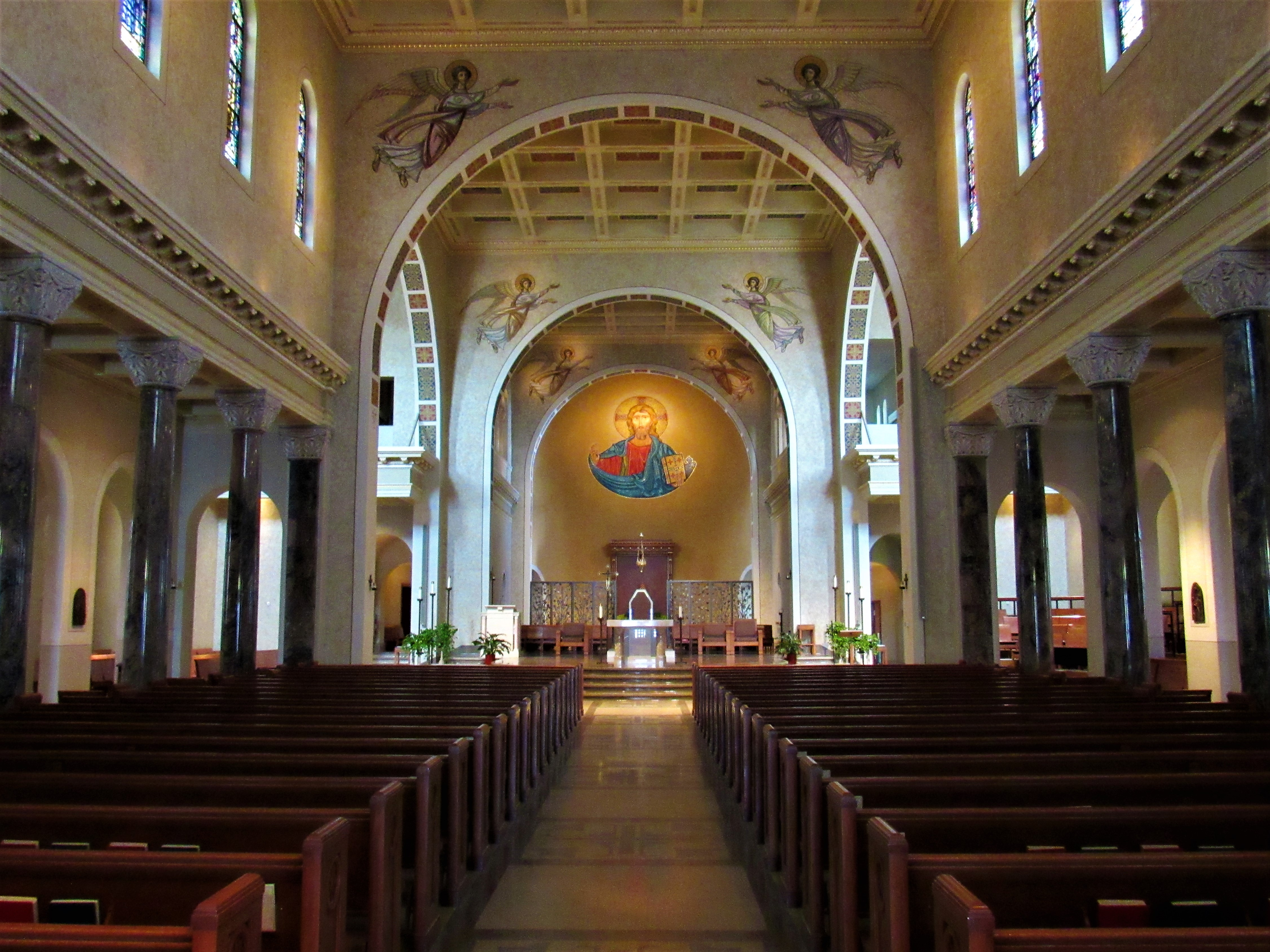
Cathedral interior

When the Diocese of Superior was established in 1905 Sacred Heart church, which had been established in the 1880s, was designated the pro-cathedral. Sacred Heart continued in this function until 1926.

=== 1926—1927 construction ===
The cathedral construction project was announced in February 1926 and the groundbreaking occurred on June 23, 1926. Bishop Joseph Pinten blessed and laid the cornerstone for the Cathedral of Christ the King on October 24, 1926. The next day he left to assume his new appointment at Grand Rapids, Michigan. Construction continued on into 1927. The cathedral dedication ceremony was held on Christmas, 1927.

The congregation for the cathedral parish formed by the joining of existing Sacred Heart and St. Joseph parishes.

=== 1937 fund drive ===
During the Depression funds were scarce to complete the undecorated interior of the cathedral. A fund drive was announced in 1937 by cathedral pastor Fr. Joseph Annabring to undertake this work. Despite modest funds, interior walls and ceiling were decorated and new pews, confessionals, and stained glass windows were added.

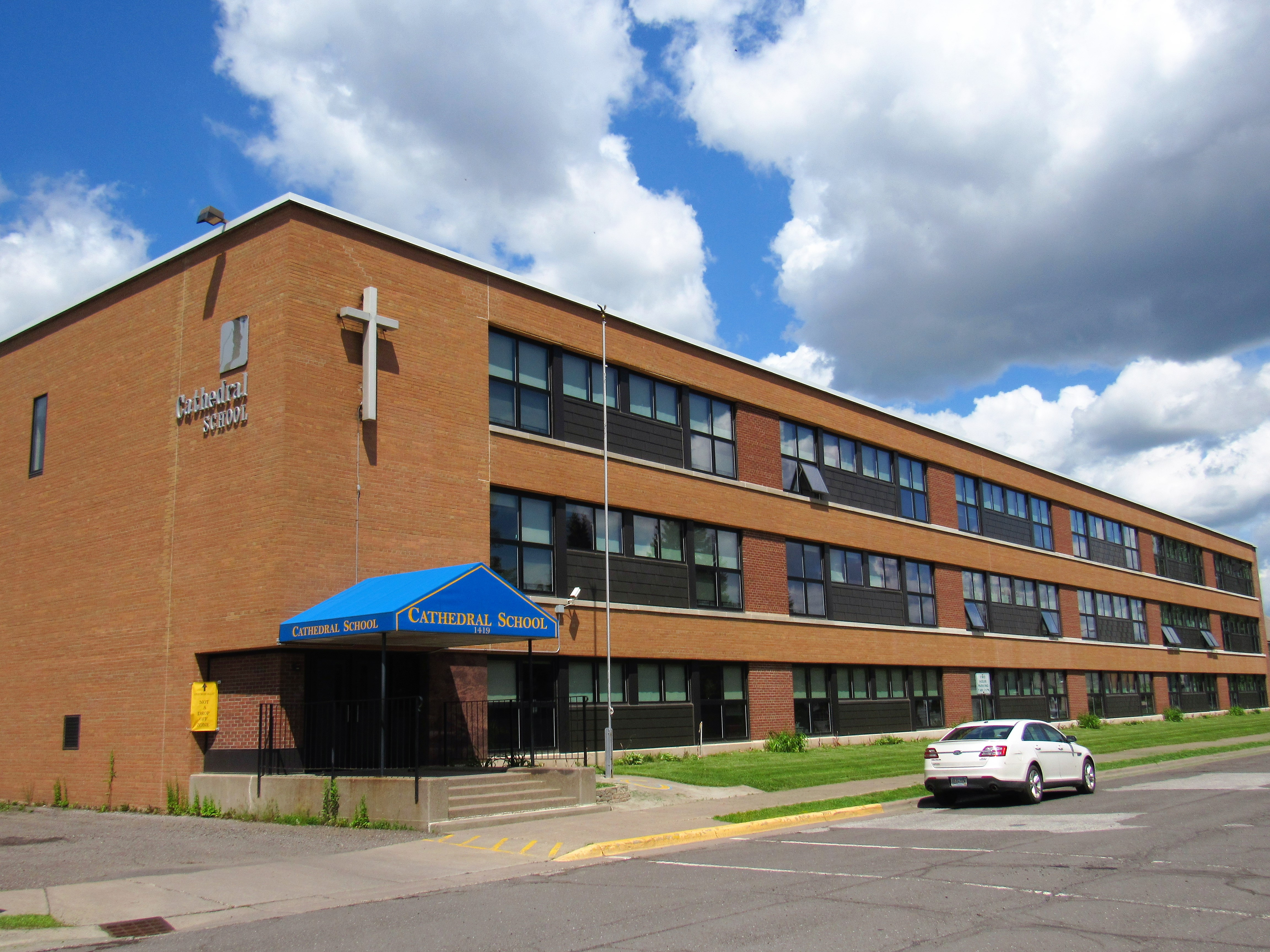
Cathedral School

=== 1946—1960 parish expansion ===
With continued growth, the cathedral congregation added a parish hall in 1946 and a rectory in 1948. The parish constructed a new school across the street from the cathedral in 1952 and a new convent in 1960.

=== 2003—2004 renovation ===
The cathedral underwent a major renovation in 2003, with the church building closed for over a year while repairs to the exterior and renovations to the interior took place. Frescoes and an improved heating and air-conditioning system were added. The church re-opened in late 2004. The dedication ceremony for the renovated cathedral was in February 2005.

== See also ==
- List of Catholic cathedrals in the United States
- List of cathedrals in the United States
