= Chlistov =

- Municipality
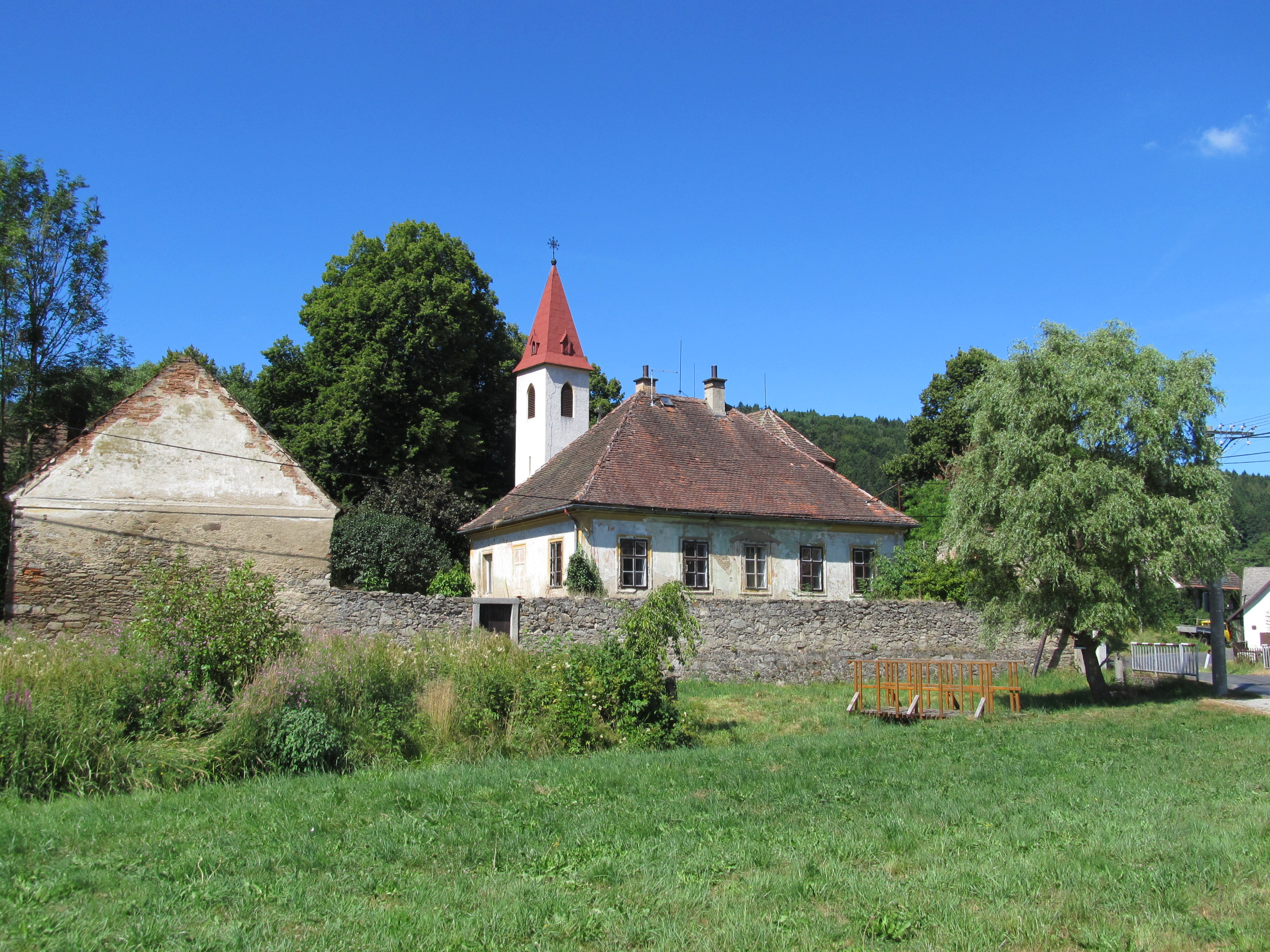
- Church of the Exaltation of the Holy Cross

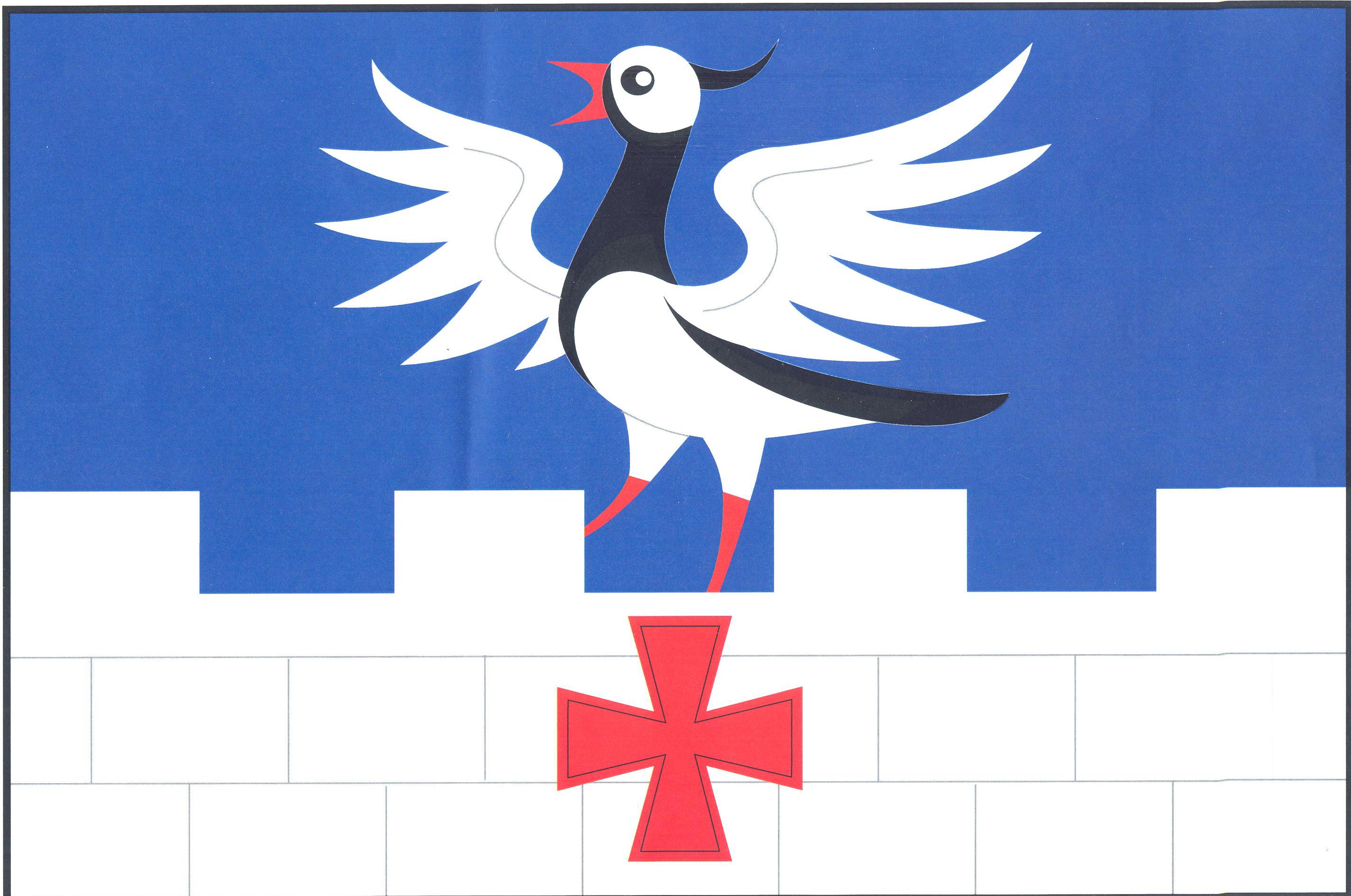
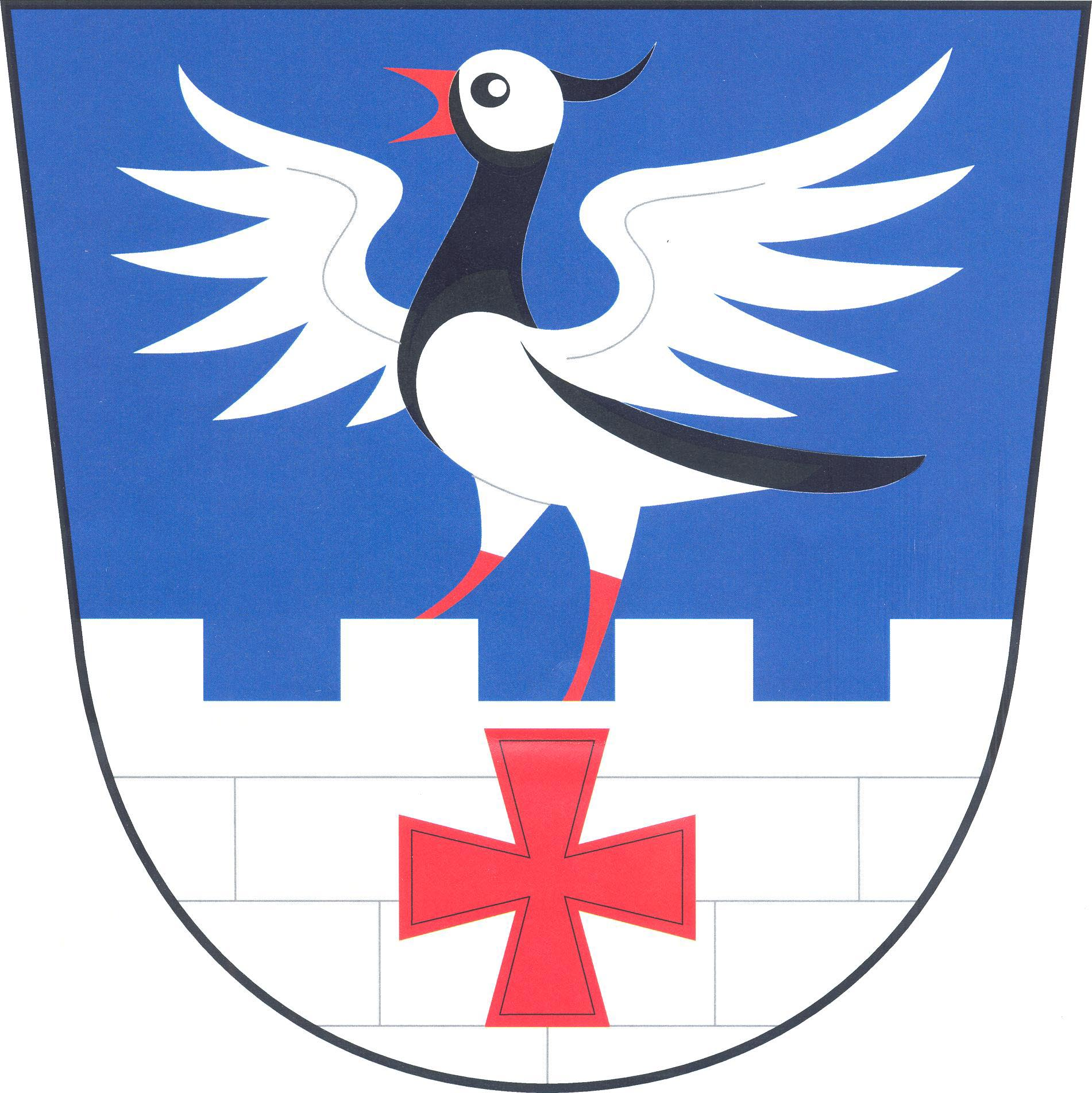
- Flag Coat of arms

- Location in the Czech Republic
- Coordinates: 49°19′12″N 13°21′39″E
- Country: Czech Republic
- Region: Plzeň
- District: Klatovy
- First mentioned: 1352

Area
  - Total: 3.92 km^{2} (1.51 sq mi)
- Elevation: 527 m (1,729 ft)

Population (2026-01-01)
  - Total: 135
  - Density: 34.4/km^{2} (89.2/sq mi)
- Time zone: UTC+1 (CET)
  - Summer (DST): UTC+2 (CEST)
- Postal code: 339 01
- Website: www.chlistov.cz

Chlistov is a municipality and village in Klatovy District in the Plzeň Region of the Czech Republic. It has about 100 inhabitants.

Chlistov lies approximately 11 kilometres (7 mi) south-east of Klatovy, 48 km (30 mi) south of Plzeň, and 115 km (71 mi) south-west of Prague.

== Demographics ==
Historical population
Year	Pop.	±%
1869	559	—
1880	564	+0.9%
1890	447	−20.7%
1900	415	−7.2%
1910	475	+14.5%
1921	440	−7.4%
1930	377	−14.3%
1950	217	−42.4%
1961	195	−10.1%
1970	163	−16.4%
1980	156	−4.3%
1991	115	−26.3%
2001	108	−6.1%
2011	110	+1.9%
2021	139	+26.4%
Source: Censuses
