= Theodore H. Reverman =

American prelate

His Excellency, The Most Reverend Theodore Henry Reverman
- Bishop of Superior
- Church: Roman Catholic Church
- See: Diocese of Superior
- In office: November 30, 1926 – July 18, 1941
- Predecessor: Joseph G. Pinten
- Successor: William Patrick O'Connor

Orders
- Ordination: July 26, 1901 by Simon Aichner
- Consecration: November 30, 1926 by John A. Floersh

Personal details
- Born: August 9, 1877 Louisville, Kentucky, US
- Died: July 18, 1941 (aged 63) Superior, Wisconsin, US
- Buried: Calvary Cemetery, Superior
- Education: St. Meinrad's College; Canisius College; University of Innsbruck; Pontifical Gregorian University
- Motto: In verbo autem tuo (But in Your word)

Theodore Henry Reverman (August 9, 1877 – July 18, 1941) was an American prelate of the Roman Catholic Church who served as the fourth bishop of the Diocese of Superior in Wisconsin from 1926 until his death in 1941.

== Biography ==
=== Early years and education ===
Theodore Reverman was born on August 9, 1877, in Louisville, Kentucky, to Theodore and Walburga Louise (née Haming) Reverman or Thomas and Louise Reverman. He attended St. Meinrad's College in St. Meinrad, Indiana for one year (1890–1891) before entering Canisius College in Buffalo, New York, where he earned a Bachelor of Arts degree in 1897. Reverman then studied at the University of Innsbruck in Innsbruck, Austria from 1897 to 1901.

=== Priesthood ===
Reverman was ordained to the priesthood by Archbishop Simon Aichner for the Archdiocese of Louisville at Innsbruck on July 26, 1901. He furthered his studies in Rome, where he earned a Doctor of Canon Law degree from the Pontifical Gregorian University in 1903.

Returning to Kentucky, Reverman was appointed professor of theology at Preston Park Seminary in Louisville (1903–1905) and as pastor of St. Edward Parish in Jeffersontown(1903–1921). In 1921, he was moved to St. Francis of Assisi Parish in Louisville to serve as pastor until 1926.

=== Bishop of Superior ===
On July 2, 1926, Reverman was appointed the fourth bishop of Superior by Pope Pius XI. He received his episcopal consecration at the Cathedral of the Assumption in Louisville on November 30, 1926, from Bishop John A. Floersh, with Bishops Joseph G. Pinten and Henry J. Althoff serving as co-consecrators.

Theodore Reverman died at his residence in Superior on July 18, 1941, at age 63.

== See also ==
- Catholic Church hierarchy
- Catholic Church in the United States
- Historical list of the Catholic bishops of the United States
- List of Catholic bishops of the United States
- Lists of patriarchs, archbishops, and bishops

Catholic Church titles
Preceded by Joseph G. Pinten	Bishop of Superior; 1926–1941	Succeeded by William Patrick O'Connor
