= Sintea Mare =

Sintea Mare Szinte
- Commune
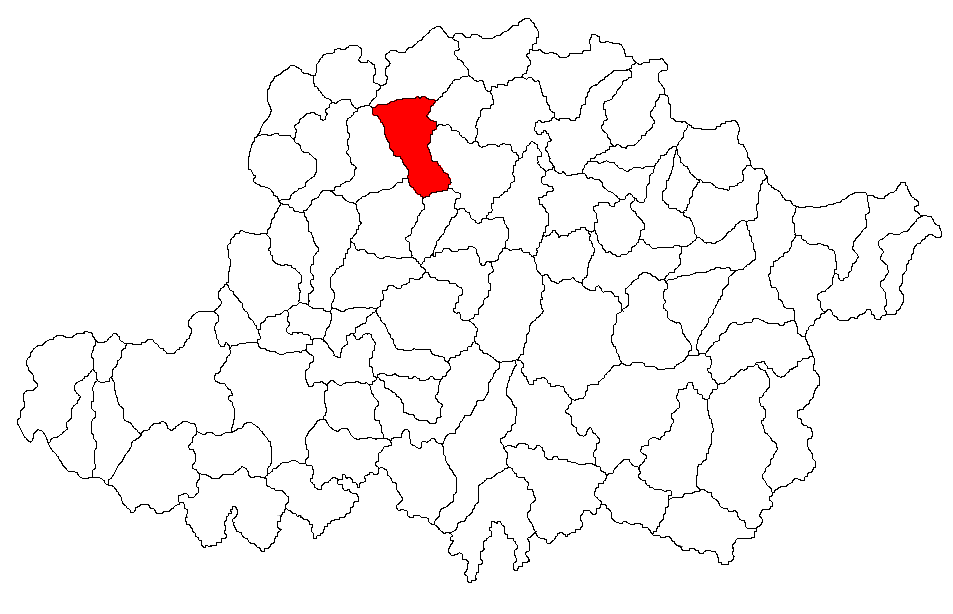
- Location in Arad County

- Location in Romania
- Coordinates: 46°31′N 21°36′E
- Country: Romania
- County: Arad
- Population (2021-12-01): 3,417
- Time zone: EET/EEST (UTC+2/+3)
- Vehicle reg.: AR

Sintea Mare (Hungarian: Szinte) is a commune in Arad County, Romania. The commune lies on the Crișul Alb Plateau, its administrative territory being 11871 hectares.

== Administration ==
The commune is composed of three villages:

In Romanian	In Hungarian	Ethnic majority
Adea	Ágya	Hungarians
Sintea Mare	Szinte	Romanians
Țipar	Szapáryliget	Hungarians

== Population ==
According to the last census, the population of the commune counts 3661 inhabitants, out of which 50.75% are Romanians, 33.81% Hungarians, 9.64% Roma, 4.94% Slovaks, 0.84% Germans.

== History ==
The first documentary record of Sintea Mare dates back to 1337, while Adea was first mentioned in 1202–1203, while Țipar in 1881.

== Economy ==
Its economy is based on agriculture. Commerce and services have undergone a slight development in the last few years.

== Tourism ==
Situated on a plateau, the natural touristic fond of the commune is not abundant in spectacular sights. Due to the customs and traditions specific to the ethnic groups of this area Sintea Mare commune is a quite attractive place during the period of Christian festivals.
