= Diocese of Superior =

Latin Catholic ecclesiastical jurisdiction in Wisconsin, USA

Coordinates: 46°42′25″N 92°05′07″W

Diocese of Superior Dioecesis Superiorensis
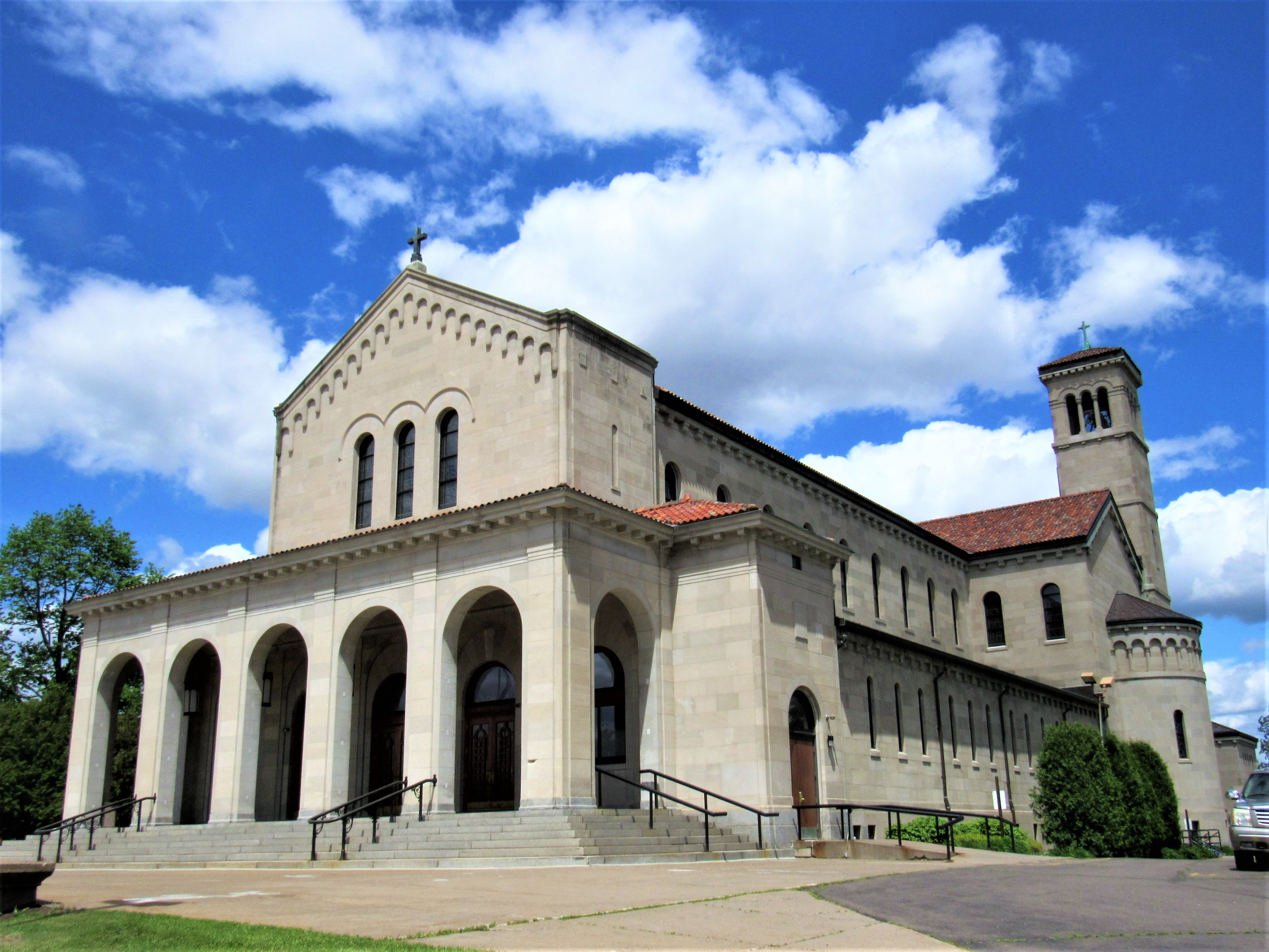
- Cathedral of Christ the King

- Coat of arms

Location
- Country: United States
- Territory: 16 counties in northwestern Wisconsin
- Ecclesiastical province: Milwaukee

Statistics
- Area: 15,715 sq mi (40,700 km^{2})
- Population: Total; Catholics: (as of 2010); 458,000; 78,826 (17.2%)
- Parishes: 105

Information
- Denomination: Catholic
- Sui iuris church: Latin Church
- Rite: Roman Rite
- Established: May 3, 1905 (121 years ago)
- Cathedral: Cathedral of Christ the King
- Patron saint: St. Augustine of Hippo

Current leadership
- Pope: Leo XIV
- Bishop: James Patrick Powers
- Metropolitan Archbishop: Jeffrey S. Grob

Map
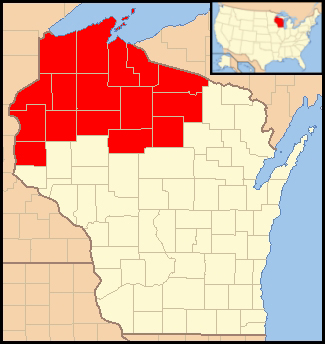

Website
- catholicdos.org

The Diocese of Superior (Latin: Dioecesis Superiorensis) is a diocese of the Catholic Church in northwest Wisconsin in the United States. Its episcopal see is Superior, and the Cathedral of Christ the King in that city is its mother church. It is a suffragan diocese of the metropolitan Archdiocese of Milwaukee.

== Territory ==
The Diocese of Superior encompasses 15,715 square miles (40,700 km^{2}). It covers the city of Superior and the Wisconsin counties of: Ashland, Barron, Bayfield, Burnett, Douglas, Iron, Lincoln, Oneida, Price, Polk, Rusk, Sawyer, St. Croix, Taylor, Vilas, and Washburn.

== History ==
=== 1600 to 1800 ===
The first Catholic presence in present-day Wisconsin was that of French Catholic missionaries in the Green Bay area in the 17th century. When French explorer Jean Nicolet entered the Green Bay areas in 1634, he was followed by Jesuit missionaries. Wisconsin became part of the French colony of New France.

The first Catholic missionary in the Superior region was René Menard, a French Jesuit missionary who was fluent in the Ojibwe, Odawa, and Huron dialects. In Spring 1661, he explored to Chequamegon Bay on Lake Superior. In 1665, Claude Allouez started a Catholic mission near Chequamegon Bay, naming it the Mission of the Holy Ghost. In 1669, Jacques Marquette arrived at the mission after Allouez moved to the Fox River Valley. Marquette baptized over 1,000 converts. In 1669, Allouez and Marquette established St. Joseph in La Pointe, but it was later abandoned.

Allouez celebrated Mass with a Native American tribe near present-day Oconto, Wisconsin in December 1669, the feast of St. Francis Xavier. He established the Saint Francis Xavier Mission there. The mission moved to Red Banks for a short time in 1671, and then to De Pere, where it remained until 1687, when it was burned. The missionaries worked with the Fox, Sauk, and Winnebago tribes, protected by Fort Francis near Green Bay. When Fort Francis was destroyed in 1728, the missionaries left the area.

When the British took control of New France in 1763 after the French and Indian War, the bishops in Quebec continued to have jurisdiction in the Wisconsin region. With the end of the American Revolution in 1783, the new United States took over the region.

In 1791, soon after the conclusion of the American Revolution, Pope Pius VI erected the Diocese of Baltimore. It covered all the American states and the Northwest Territory, which included part of present-day Wisconsin. The rest of Wisconsin became part of the territory after the Louisiana Purchase in 1803.

=== 1800 to 1900 ===
Catholic jurisdiction for the new Wisconsin Territory passed to the Diocese of Bardstown in 1808, then the Diocese of Cincinnati in 1826. The first new Catholic church in the Wisconsin area in over 100 years was constructed in Fort Howard in 1825. Its parishioners included many French Canadians living in the settlement.

In 1833, the new Diocese of Detroit assumed jurisdiction over the Wisconsin area. In 1836, Frederic Baraga arrived at La Pointe and built a log church to re-established St. Joseph's Parish. His congregation of Native American converts and French fur traders grew rapidly. In 1838, Baraga built a larger church at La Pointe, on the location of St. Joseph's Catholic Church.

In November 1843, Pope Gregory XVI erected the Diocese of Milwaukee, taking its territory from the Diocese of Detroit. The new diocese covered all of the Wisconsin Territory, including part of present-day Minnesota. Wisconsin achieved statehood in 1848. Pope Pius IX established the Diocese of Lacrosse and the Diocese of Green Bay in 1868, taking the northwest Wisconsin counties from the Diocese of Milwaukee.

=== 1900 to 1920 ===
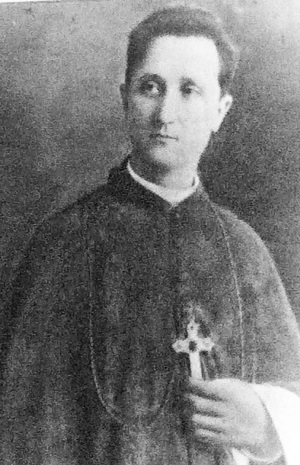
Bishop Schinner (1905)

The Diocese of Superior was erected on May 3, 1905, by Pope Pius X. It was created from the northern part of the Diocese of La Crosse and the northwestern part of the Diocese of Green Bay. The pope named Augustine Schinner from Milwaukee as the first bishop of Superior.

When the diocese was established, it had 39 diocesan priests, 17 religious order priests serving 38,861 Catholics in 43 parishes with resident pastors, and 50 missions and 33 stations. There was one Catholic high school, 16 elementary and two boarding schools, for a total enrollment of 9,016 students. Schinner immediately saw the need for an additional 10 priests. By the time Schinner resigned in 1913, the pool of priests had grown from 39 in 1905 to 62 priests.

In 1913, Pope Pius X appointed Auxiliary Bishop Joseph Koudelka of Milwaukee as the second bishop of Superior. Koudelka ordained Philip B. Gordon, the first Ojibwa priest and the second Native American Catholic priest in the country. Fluent in eight languages, Koudelka authored books in Czech, German and English. As bishop, he also learned to speak the Ojibwe language. Koudelka created the Catholic Charities Bureau in Superior. In 1917, he dedicated St. Joseph's Children's Home in Superior, an orphanage that housed up to 200 children. Koudelka died in 1921.

=== 1920 to 1946 ===
In 1921, Pope Benedict XV appointed Joseph G. Pinten of the Diocese of Sault Sainte Marie–Marquette as the third bishop of Superior. After his arrival in Superior, Pinten purchased a home for himself. When he learned that a local community of sisters was living in an overcrowded residence, he remodeled the house and quietly turned it over to them. He oversaw numerous building and expansion projects throughout the diocese. Ground breaking for the new cathedral began in 1926. In his last act as bishop of Superior, Pinten blessed and laid the cornerstone for the Cathedral of Christ the King in Superior in October 1926. The next day he left for his new appointment as bishop of the Diocese of Grand Rapids.

To replace Pinten, Pope Pius XI in 1926 named Theodore H. Reverman of the Archdiocese of Louisville as the next bishop of Superior. That same year, the Sisters of Mercy of the Holy Cross founded Holy Cross Hospital in Merrill. It is today Aspirus Merrill Hospital. Reverman dedicated the new Cathedral of Christ the King in 1927. In 1929, the Servants of Mary built a new motherhouse in Ladysmith. St. Joseph Hospital was opened in Ashland in 1937 by the Sisters of St. Joseph.

After 15 years in office, Reverman died in 1941. Pope Pius XII then selected William O'Connor of Milwaukee as bishop of Superior. During his tenure as bishop, O'Connor founded three new parishes, opened two new schools, and erected ten units of the Confraternity of Christian Doctrine with a total enrollment of 12,000 children. A former military chaplain, he also oversaw the diocese's war efforts during World War II, including local blood drives. Pius XII appointed O'Connor as bishop of the Diocese of Madison in 1946.

=== 1946 to present ===
Albert Meyer of Milwaukee was the next bishop of Superior, named by Pius XII in 1946. During his tenure, Meyer oversaw the construction of 15 churches and ten schools. He was appointed archbishop of Milwaukee by the same pope in 1953. Pius XII then named Joseph Annabring of Superior to replace Meyer. Annabring established a Family Life Bureau and in 1955 a diocesan Council for Men. In 1957, he set up the St. Thomas Moore Institute for Adult Education to educated the laity about Catholicism. Annabring died suddenly in 1959.

Pope John XXIII selected George Hammes from La Crosse as the next bishop of Superior in 1960. After attending the Second Vatican Council, in Rome during the early 1960s, Hammes instituted its reforms in the diocese. They included celebrating mass in the vernacular instead of Latin and raising the confirmation age to 16. He also created a diocesan pastoral council and instructed the parishes to set up their own pastoral councils. Pope John Paul II named Raphael Fliss from Milwaukee as coadjutor bishop for the diocese in 1979 to assist Hammes.

After 25 years as bishop of Superior, Hammes retired in 1985; Fliss automatically succeeded him as bishop. In March 1991, Fliss announced that the diocese would be closing 16 parishes within the year. Fliss retired as bishop of Superior in 2007. Later that year, Pope Benedict XVI named Peter Christensen of the Archdiocese of Saint Paul and Minneapolis as bishop of Superior. In 2011, Dan Dahlberg, pastor of St. Patrick's Parish in Hudson, was charged with stealing $11,000 from the parish. He admitted his guilt, saying that he was suffering from problem gambling.

In January 2014, Christensen announced that the diocese would not use the Common Core curriculum in the diocesan schools. Pope Francis named him as bishop of the Diocese of Boise in 2014. Pope Francis in 2014 named James Powers from Superior as the next bishop of Superior.

=== Reports of sex abuse ===
Lawrence Murphy, director of the St. John's School for the Deaf in St. Francis, was forced to resign his position in 1974 due to complaints of sexual abuse of students. The Vatican later confirmed that he had abused as many as 200 hearing impaired students there. Murphy was allowed to transfer in 1974 into the Diocese of Superior, where he worked in three parishes up to 1994. Two men from Boulder Junction reported abuse by Murphy during this time period to the diocese. The diocese and the Archdiocese of Milwaukee petitioned the Vatican in the late 1990s for his laicization, but the Vatican declined, having received a statement of repentance from Murphy. He died in 1998.

The parents of a 14-year-old boy accused the priest David Malsch in 1991 of sexually assaulting their son in a swimming pool and taking nude pictures of him. The diocese removed Malsch from ministry and sent him away for treatment. Malsch was charged in November 1992 with second-degree sexual assault, child enticement and misdemeanor sexual exploitation of a child. He pleaded no contest in November 1993 to child enticement and was sentenced to one year in prison. Masch was laicized in 2005, the same year he was sentenced to nine years in prison for possession of child pornography.

In February 2002, the priest Ryan Erickson shot and killed James Ellison and Daniel O'Connell at a funeral home in Hudson. O'Connell had earlier confronted Erickson, accusing him of molesting several local children. In 2004, Erickson hanged himself after coming under suspicion for the double homicide.

Tom Ericksen, a former diocesan priest, was arrested in Minneapolis, Minnesota in November 2018 on a warrant from Sawyer County. He was accused of sexually assaulting three boys between 1982 and 1983 when he was posted at St. Peter's Church in Winter, Wisconsin. The diocese removed Ericksen from ministry in 1983 and the Vatican laicized him in 1988. The diocese settled a lawsuit in 1989 with Paul and James Eck regarding Ericksen for approximately $3 million. The first police report by a victim against Ericksen was filed in 2011. Ericksen admitted to a detective in 2016 that he had molested five boys. He was convicted in September 2019 and sentence to 30 years in prison. The diocese in 2022 released a list of 23 clergy with credible accusations of sexual abuse of minors.

== Bishops ==
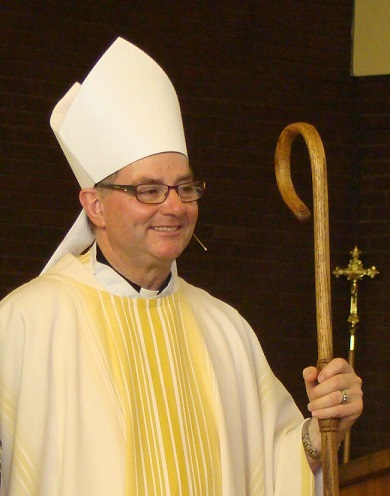
Bishop Powers (2016)

=== Bishops of Superior ===
1. Augustine Francis Schinner (1905–1913)
2. Joseph Maria Koudelka (1913–1921)
3. Joseph G. Pinten (1922–1926)
4. Theodore H. Reverman (1926–1941)
5. William Patrick O'Connor (1942–1946), appointed Bishop of Madison
6. Albert Gregory Meyer (1946–1953), appointed Archbishop of Milwaukee and Archbishop of Chicago (elevated to Cardinal in 1959)
7. Joseph John Annabring (1954–1959)
8. George Albert Hammes (1960–1985)
9. Raphael Michael Fliss (1985–2007)
10. Peter F. Christensen (2007–2014), appointed Bishop of Boise
11. James Patrick Powers (2016–present)

== Media ==
- The Diocese of Superior publishes a bi-weekly newspaper, The Superior Catholic Herald, founded in 1953.
- Real Presence Radio (WWEN), broadcasts from Wentworth and serves the Duluth-Superior area. It is part of the Real Presence Radio network.
- Holy Family Radio (WWMD-LP), a 100-watt station, broadcasts from Ashland on 95.5 FM. The station is an affiliate of Relevant Radio, a Catholic Radio network based in Green Bay. Holy Family Educational Association, Inc. manages the station, which has been on the air since 2007 and reaches the Ashland and Washburn area.

== Demographics ==
As of 2023, the Diocese of Superior served a Catholic population over 64,000 in 103 parishes and one mission. Seven of those parishes stood as single parish units, and 96 parishes had been combined to form 32 clusters. The diocese had 43 priests and 70permanent deacons. There are 74 Catholic cemeteries.

== Catholic schools ==
As of 2026, the Diocese of Superior operates 14 elementary schools, with over 1,600 students. There are no seminaries or high schools. Catholic schools operate in the following communities:

- Ashland – Our Lady of the Lake School
- Hudson – St. Patrick School
- Ladysmith – Our Lady of Sorrows School
- Medford – Holy Rosary School
- Merrill – St. Francis Xavier School
- New Richmond – St. Mary School
- Reserve – St. Francis Solanus School
- Rhinelander – Nativity of Our Lord School
- Rice Lake – St. Joseph School
- River Falls – St. Bridget School
- Somerset – St. Anne School
- Spooner – St. Francis de Sales School
- Superior – Cathedral School
- Tomahawk – St. Mary School

== Arms ==
Coat of arms of Diocese of Superior
| Notes Arms was designed and adopted when the diocese was erected Adopted 1905 Escutcheon The coat of arms contains three Latin fitchy crosses. "Fitchy" means that the crosses have pointed ends to facilitate driving them into the ground. The crosses terminate in fleur-de-lis with wavy blue line on the top of the shield in the "chief" or upper partition. Symbolism The arms use gold and blue, the colors of the French arms, to commemorate the French missionaries in Wisconsin. The Latin crosses symbolize the missionaries and the fleur-de-lis also symbolizes France. The number of crosses is Trinitarian to represent the Holy Trinity. The three crosses also commemorate the edict of King Charles V in 1376 when he reduced the number of fleur-de-lis in the French coat-of-arms to three to honor the Three Divine Persons. The wavy blue line symbolizes the blue waters of Lake Superior. |
