= Albert Gregory Meyer =

American prelate (1903–1965)

His Eminence Albert Gregory Meyer
- Cardinal, Archbishop of Chicago
- See: Chicago
- Appointed: September 19, 1958
- Installed: November 16, 1958
- Term ended: April 9, 1965
- Predecessor: Samuel Stritch
- Successor: John Cody
- Other post: Cardinal-Priest of Santa Cecilia in Trastevere
- Previous posts: Archbishop of Milwaukee (1953–1958); Bishop of Superior (1946–1953)

Orders
- Ordination: July 11, 1926 by Basilio Pompili
- Consecration: April 11, 1946 by Moses E. Kiley
- Created cardinal: December 14, 1959 by John XXIII
- Rank: Cardinal-Priest

Personal details
- Born: March 9, 1903 Milwaukee, Wisconsin
- Died: April 9, 1965 (aged 62) Chicago, Illinois
- Buried: University of Saint Mary of the Lake
- Education: Pontifical Urban College for the Propagation of the Faith; Pontifical Biblical Institute
- Motto: Adveniat Regnum Tuum (Thy kingdom come)

Styles of Albert Meyer
- Reference style: His Eminence
- Spoken style: Your Eminence
- Informal style: Cardinal
- See: Chicago

Albert Gregory Meyer (March 9, 1903 – April 9, 1965) was an American Catholic prelate who served as Archbishop of Chicago from 1958 until his death in 1965. He was appointed a cardinal in 1959. He previously served as archbishop of Milwaukee in Wisconsin from 1953 to 1958 and as bishop of Superior in Wisconsin from 1946 to 1953.

Meyer was a strong advocate for racial justice and a firm supporter of Dr. Martin Luther King Jr. He was also a voice for religious tolerance and for the reconciliation of the Catholic Church with the Jewish people.

== Biography ==
=== Early life and education ===
Albert Meyer was born on March 9, 1903, in Milwaukee, Wisconsin, to Peter James Meyer, a grocer, and Mathilda (née Thelen) Meyer, both German immigrants. The fourth of five children, he had two brothers and two sisters; one sister became a nun. As a child, Albert Meyer would pretend to celebrate mass with a toy altar and a glass of water for the chalice of wine.

Meyer received his early education under the School Sisters of Notre Dame at the parochial school of St. Mary's Parish in Milwaukee. After finishing the eighth grade, Meyer wanted to immediately enter St. Francis de Sales Seminary in St. Francis, Wisconsin. However, James Meyer was forced to close his grocery store in 1912, forcing his son to attend Marquette Academy in Milwaukee for two years.

With the assistance of a benefactor, Albert Meyer was finally able to pay the tuition for St. Francis at age 14. In 1922, Archbishop Sebastian Messmer sent him to Rome to continue his studies at the Pontifical Urban College for the Propagation of the Faith, while residing at the seminary in the Pontifical North American College.

=== Priesthood ===
On July 11, 1926, Meyer was ordained to the priesthood for the Archdiocese of Milwaukee by Cardinal Basilio Pompili, at the church of Santa Maria sopra Minerva in Rome. Meyer then continued his studies in Rome at the Pontifical Biblical Institute, obtaining a Doctorate in Holy Scriptures in 1930.

After returning to Wisconsin in 1930, the archdiocese assigned Meyer as curate at St. Joseph's Parish in Waukesha, Wisconsin. In 1931, he was appointed to the faculty of St. Francis de Sales Seminary, teaching religion, Greek, Latin, biblical archeology, dogmatic theology and Scripture. While at the seminary, Meyer translated three books of the New Testament into English.

When Monsignor Aloisius Muench was named bishop of the Diocese of Fargo, Meyer succeeded him as rector of the seminary in 1937. The Vatican raised Meyer to the rank of domestic prelate, with the title of monsignor, in 1938. He also served as a chaplain and adviser to the local Serra Club.

=== Bishop of Superior ===
On February 18, 1946, Meyer was appointed the sixth bishop of Superior by Pope Pius XII. Meyer was consecrated on April 11, 1946, by Archbishop Moses E. Kiley, with Bishops Muench and William O'Connor serving as co-consecrators, in the Cathedral of St. John the Evangelist in Milwaukee.

As one of his first actions in Superior, Meyer banned young priests from owning cars and demanded that they pay back the diocese the costs of their seminary preparations. However, after receiving backlash from the clergy, Meyer dropped these demands.

Meyer in 1950 inaugurated the Diocesan Council of Women to involve Catholic women in the operation of the diocese. He also established the Apostolate of Vocations to encourage more youth to become seminarians and started the Catholic Herald Citizen diocesan newspaper. Meyer wrote a series of outlines of sermons to be used by his priests; they soon gained popularity among priests throughout Wisconsin.

Meyer opened the third synod of the diocese in 1953. By the time Meyer left Superior in 1953, he had built 15 churches and opened ten schools.

=== Archbishop of Milwaukee ===
Pius XII appointed Meyer as the seventh archbishop of Milwaukee on July 21, 1953. He was installed on September 24, 1953. In 1956, Meyer published a pastoral letter titled "Decency and Modesty", in which he condemned sexual content in films and television, along with what he considered to be immodest clothing worn in public.

Meyer in 1958 established a Council of Catholic Men to involve laymen in the running of the archdiocese. He also instituted a $3.23 million capital improvement project for the archdiocese, including St. Francis de Sales Seminary. During his tenure in Milwaukee, Meyer constructed 17 parishes and converted five mission churches into parishes.

=== Archbishop of Chicago ===
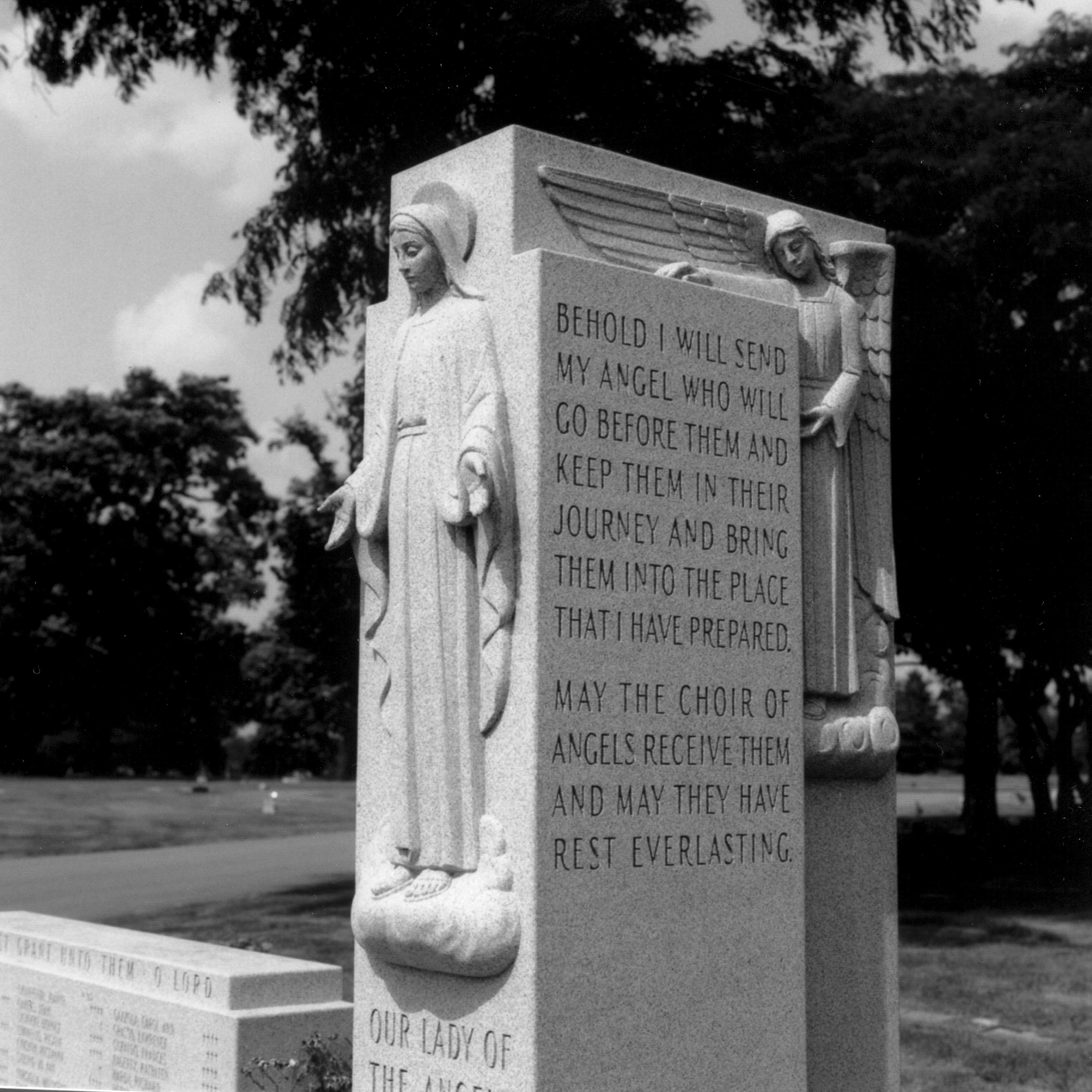
Monument in Chicago to victims of the 1958 Queen of the Angels Fire (2006)

Pius Xll appointed Meyer as archbishop of Chicago on September 19, 1958. He was installed on November 14, 1958.

On December 1, 1958, a fire broke out at Our Lady of the Angels School in Chicago, killing 92 students and three nuns. While visiting the hospital and morgue with Chicago Mayor Richard M. Daley, Meyer was overcome with grief. Cardinal Francis Spellman travelled to Chicago from New York City to support Meyer and Pope John XXIII sent him a condolence telegram. After the fire, the archdiocese faced $44 million in lawsuits from the families of victims and survivors. Six years later, after a long series of settlement talks, Meyer decided to provide reparations to all the victims and survivors.

Meyer is featured in the 1958 film Decision for Happiness, produced by the Congregation of Sisters of St. Agnes.In 1960, Meyer banned parishes from holding bingo games in response to reports of corruption in their management. In January 1961, during riots in the African-American Bronzeville neighborhood of Chicago, he issued this statement:

We must remove from the church on the local scene any possible taint of racial discrimination or racial segregation, and help provide the moral leadership for eliminating racial discrimination from the whole community.

== Cardinal ==
Meyer was created cardinal priest of the church of Santa Cecilia in Trastevere in Rome by Pope John XXIII in the consistory of December 14, 1959. Church observers were surprised by his appointment as he had not spent much time either in Rome after finishing his education or as archbishop of Chicago. Meyer participated at the first three sessions of the Second Vatican Council in Rome from 1962 to 1964, and sat on its Board of Presidency. During the council, Meyer showed himself to be of liberal tendencies and was viewed as the chief intellectual among the participating American hierarchy.

The scholarly and often shy prelate supported religious liberty. He strongly condemned racism, warning his clergy "not to foster the flame of racial hatred". At the 1963 National Conference on Race and Religion in Chicago, Meyer delivered a speech along with Dr. Martin Luther King Jr. Meyer also worked with the community activist Saul Alinsky and supported the integration of the archdiocesan schools.

Meyer served as a cardinal elector in the 1963 papal conclave that selected Pope Paul VI. Meyer, an occasional fisherman, once called fishing the "apostolic recreation", and was also known to attend Milwaukee Braves baseball games.

== Death and legacy ==
Meyer in January 1965 was hospitalized at Mercy Hospital in Chicago for treatment of gallstones. After his discharge, he started suffering severe headaches a few weeks later. He re-entered Mercy in February and was diagnosed with a malignant brain tumor. He underwent an operation on February 25th, but never recovered from the surgery. Albert Meyer died at age 62 on April 9, 1965, at Mercy Hospital.

Meyer is buried in the cemetery of the University of Saint Mary of the Lake in Mundelein, Illinois. The American Jewish Committee called Meyer"...one of the great liberal spirits of our time."

Meyer was honored by naming at the following institutions:

- St. Albert Parish in Land of Lakes, Wisconsin
- Cardinal Meyer Library at Marian University in Fond du Lac, Wisconsin
- Cardinal Meyer Center, a part of the Archdiocese of Chicago in Chicago
- Cardinal Meyer Lecture series at the University of Saint Mary of the Lake

== See also ==
- Catholic Church hierarchy
- Catholic Church in the United States
- Historical list of the Catholic bishops of the United States
- List of Catholic bishops of the United States
- Lists of patriarchs, archbishops, and bishops

Catholic Church titles
Preceded by Samuel Stritch	Archbishop of Chicago; 1958–1965	Succeeded by John Cody
Vacant Title last held by Gaetano Cicognani	Cardinal-Priest of Santa Cecilia in Trastevere; 1959–1965	Vacant Title next held by John Cody
Preceded by Moses E. Kiley	Archbishop of Milwaukee; 1953–1958	Succeeded by William Cousins
Preceded by William Patrick O'Connor	Bishop of Superior; 1946–1953	Succeeded by Joseph John Annabring
