= The Minnesota Pioneer to its Patrons =

1850 poem about Saint Paul, Minnesota

- attributed to either James Goodhue or Lucien Galtier
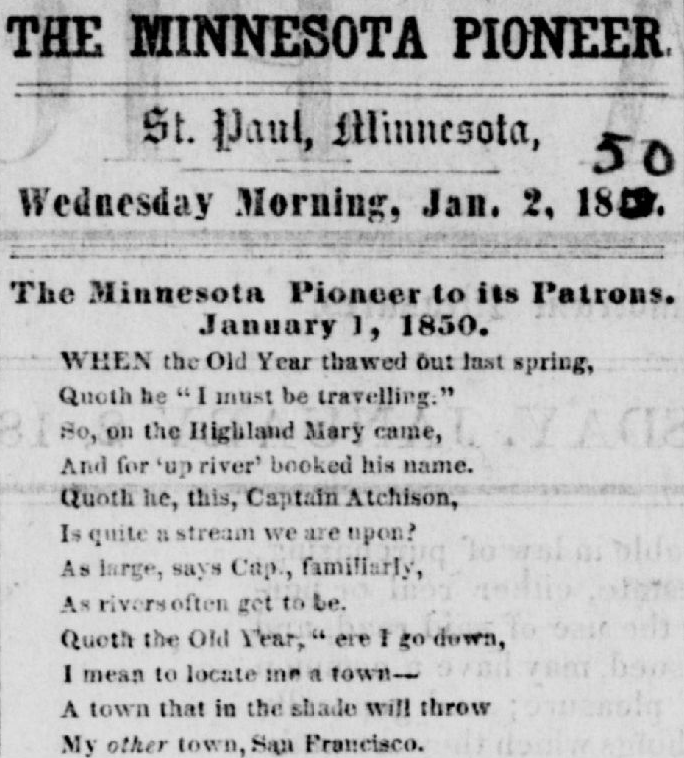
- The opening lines of the poem as printed in the January 2, 1850, edition of the Minnesota Pioneer
- First published in: Minnesota Pioneer
- Country: United States
- Language: English
- Subject: Saint Paul, Minnesota
- Genre: Doggerel
- Rhyme scheme: AABB
- Publication date: January 2, 1850
- Media type: Newspaper
- Lines: 78

"The Minnesota Pioneer to its Patrons" is a humorous poem about the city of Saint Paul, Minnesota, published in the Minnesota Pioneer on January 2, 1850 (but dated January 1, 1850). It has variously been attributed to the newspaper editor James Goodhue or to Father Lucien Galtier.

== Background ==
From the early 1700s, newspapers had begun to publish New Years' proclamations. By the 1800s, they had an established form of summarizing the previous year and looking forward to the year to come. The address given on January 2, 1850, in the Minnesota Pioneer was the first to be given to the newly established Minnesota Territory. The poem outlined the history of the area and the origins of Saint Paul, referencing the prior geographical moniker of "Pig's Eye", and laid out an optimistic view of the future, ending with a reference to the Conversion of Paul the Apostle and the changing of the settlement's name from the "Pig's Eye" to "Saint Paul". It has been described as an "amusing doggerel".

The poem was published without attribution. Lucien Galtier is sometimes said to have proclaimed the final phrases at the dedication of the log cabin chapel of Saint Paul on November 1, 1841. The poem in its entirety was often attributed in the decades following publication to the Minnesota Pioneer editor, James Goodhue.

The poem was often cited in the early decades of the twentieth century as a confirmation of the "christening" and "metamorphosis" of the settlement. It was also cited when honoring Father Galtier after his death for his role in naming the city.

== Summary ==
Narrated by the "Old Year" of 1849, the poem reflects on the transformation of the small settlement of Pig's Eye into the City of Saint Paul. Describing various struggles in Europe, the narrator expresses thankfulness for America, despite the presidency of Zachary Taylor. The poem celebrates the great growth in commerce along the Mississippi River and, alluding to the conversion of Paul the Apostle, declares the area from Saint Anthony Falls to Pig's Eye Landing (Note: Near the modern-day Robert Street Bridge.) to be "converted" from Pig's Eye to Saint Paul.

== Text ==
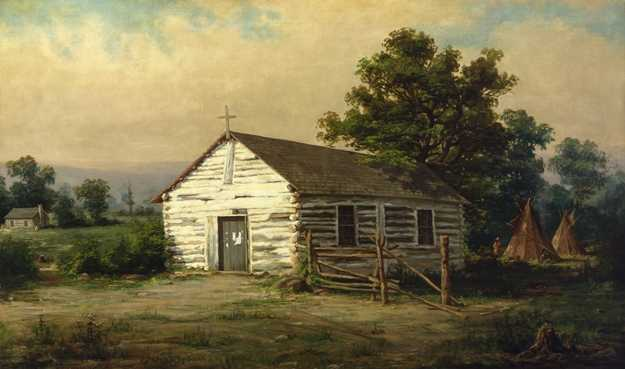
An oil painting of the chapel of Saint Paul by Alexis Jean Fournier

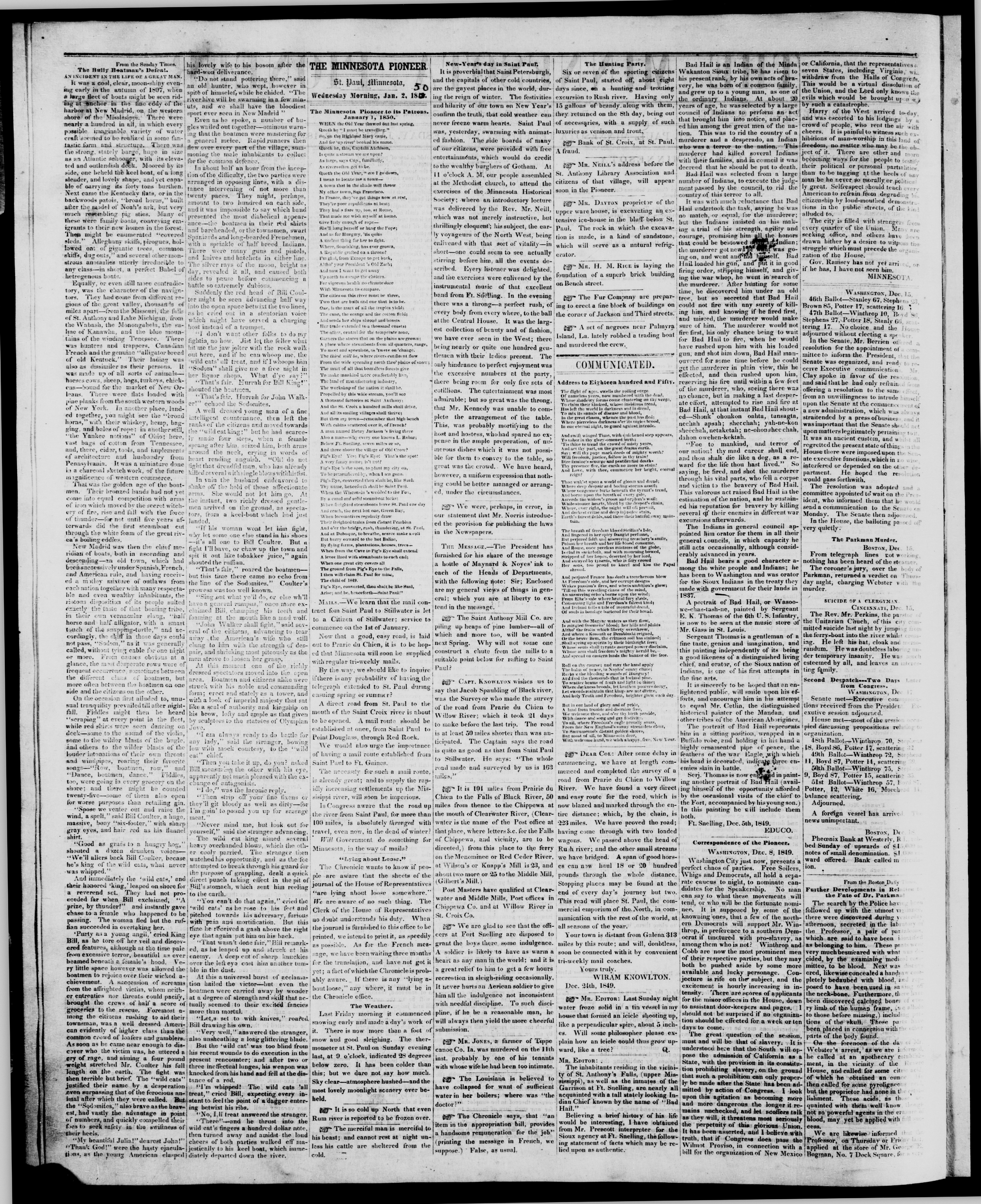
The second page of the January 2, 1850, edition of the Minnesota Pioneer, on which the poem was printed

When the Old Year thawed out last spring,
Quoth he "I must be travelling."
So, on the Highland Mary came,
And for 'up river' booked his name.
Quoth he, this, Captain Atchison,
Is quite a stream we are upon?
As large, says Cap., familiarly,
As rivers often get to be.
Quoth the Old Year, "ere I go down,
I mean to locate me a town—
A town that in the shade will throw
My other town, San Francisco.
In France, they've got things now at rest,
They're poor republicans at best;
They had a flare up, too, at Rome,
That made me wish myself at home.
Give Italy enough of rope—
She'll hang herself or hang the Pope;
And as for Hungary, 'tis quite
A useless thing for her to fight.
Where, flourishing, has ever grown,
A Republic grafted on a throne?
I'm glad, from Europe to get back,
Altho your President 's Old Zach;
And now I want to get away
Up north to escape the cholera.
For vigorous health no climate dare
With Minnesota to compare.
The cities on this river must be three,
Two that are built and one that is to be.
One, is the mart of all the tropics yield;
The cane, the orange and the cotton field;
And sends her ships abroad and boasts
Her trade extended to a thousand coasts:
The other, central for the temperate zone,
Garners the stores that on the plains are grown;
A place where steamboats from all quarters, range,
To meet and speculate, as 'twere on 'change.
The third will be, where rivers confluent flow
From the wide spreading north thro' plains of snow
The mart of all that boundless forests give
To make mankind more comfortably live,
The land of manufacturing industry,
The workshop of the nation it shall be.
Propelled by this wide stream, you'll see
A thousand factories at Saint Anthony:
And the St. Croix a hundred mills shall drive,
And all its smiling villages shall thrive;
But then my town—remember that high bench
With cabins scattered over it, of French?
A man named Henry Jackson's living there
Also a man—why every one knows L. Robar;
Below Ft. Snelling, seven miles or so,
And three above the village of Old Crow?
Pig's Eye? Yes; Pig's Eye! That's the spot!
A very funny name; is't not?
Pig's Eye's the spot, to plant my city on,
To be remembered by, when I am gone.
Pig's Eye, converted thou shalt be, like Saul:
Thy name, henceforth shall be Saint Paul.
When the Wisconsin's wedded to the Fox,
By a canal and solid steamboat locks;
When freighted steamboats leave St. Paul one day
And reach, the next but one, Green Bay,
When locomotives regularly draw
Their freighted trains from distant Pembina
And o'er the bridge, rush, thundering, at St. Paul,
And at Dubuque, to breathe, scarce make a call
But hurry onward to the hot Balize,
By flying farms, plantations, houses, trees-
When from the Cave to Pig's Eye shall extend
A levee lined with steamboats to each end;
When one great city covers all
The ground from Pig's Eye to the Falls,
I then will claim St. Paul for mine,
The child of 1849.
Pig's Eye, converted, thou shalt be like Saul,
Arise; and be, henceforth—Saint Paul!"
