= First Cathedral of Saint Paul (Minnesota) =

Catholic log chapel in Saint Paul (1841–1856 or 1864)

Cathedral of Saint Paul
- Chapel of Saint Paul
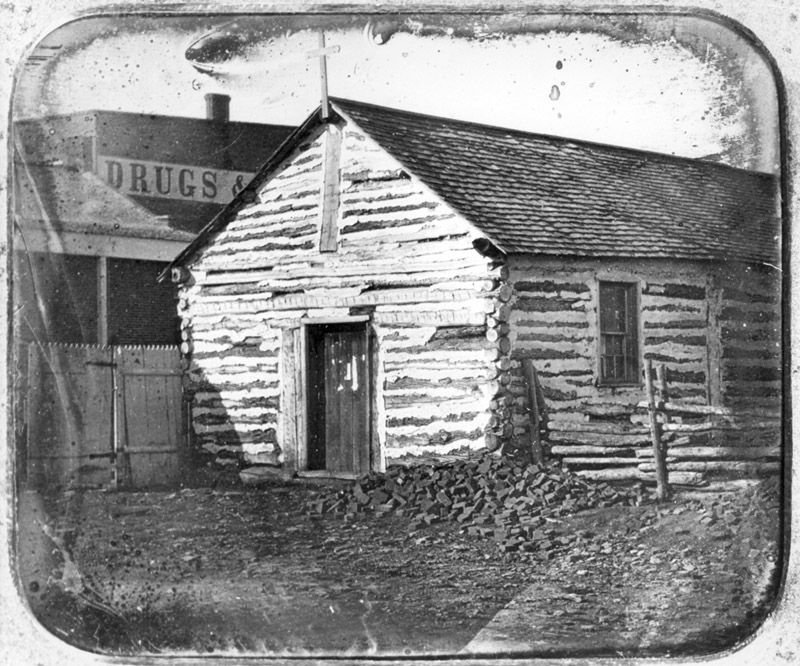
- The chapel c. 1851
- Cathedral of Saint Paul
- 44°56′43″N 93°05′22″W
- Country: United States
- Denomination: Catholic Church

History
- Founder: Lucien Galtier
- Consecrated: November 1, 1841

Architecture
- Functional status: Demolished
- Years built: 1841

The Chapel of Saint Paul, which later served as the first Cathedral of Saint Paul, was a log chapel built on the bluffs of the Mississippi River in 1841 by Lucien Galtier. From July 1851 to December 1851, it served as the first cathedral of the Catholic Diocese of Saint Paul. Before it was eventually dismantled, it also alternatingly served as a chapel, school, and a hospital for the Sisters of St. Joseph. While the building only stood for around two decades, it left a lasting impact as the eponym of Saint Paul, capital of the U.S. state of Minnesota. Its historical legacy also continues through a poem, subsequent cathedral buildings, and historical markers and artifacts.

== History ==
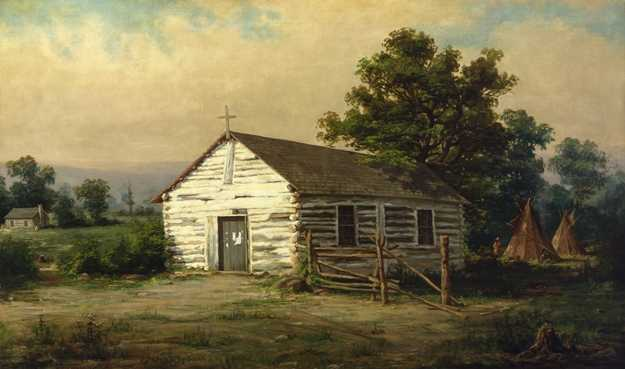
An oil painting of the chapel by Alexis Jean Fournier (Note: Msgr. Ravoux contended that this painting shows the addition, not the original chapel. However, the painting seems based on the daguerreotype (displayed as the main image of the article), which shows the chapel facing south. The addition faced north, towards Third Street.)

In 1840, Catholic missionary Father Lucien Galtier was sent by Bishop Mathias Loras of Dubuque to minister to the French Canadian settlement at the confluence of the Mississippi and Minnesota rivers. Galtier built two log chapels; one named after Saint Peter he built in Mendota. Seeking a suitable spot for another chapel on the other side of the river, Galtier looked at several claims offered to him but found them unsuitable; one was so low to the river that Galtier quipped "the idea of having the church swept down to St. Louis one day" did not please him. He looked for a location that was protected from the elements but still close enough to the river that steamboats could land and communication with other settlers along the river was possible. The location decided upon was the bluff above the "Pig's Eye" riverboat landing downriver from Fort Snelling, consisting of portions of property owned by nearby farmers Benjamin Gervais and Vital Guerin. (Note: On Bench (now Second) Street between Minnesota and Cedar Streets.) Galtier began to call the location after Saint Paul, as Sts. Peter and Paul are often paired. The name Saint Paul was then first used in official records at the marriage of Vital and Adele Guerin on January 26, 1841.

The south-facing chapel, dedicated to the Apostle Paul, was built in October 1841 using oak logs from trees felled at the site and secured by wooden pins. Contributing to the material for the rafters and shingles was a tamarack swamp on the site. Bark-covered slabs created the roof of the 20-foot (6.1 m) by 18-foot (5.5 m) building. The slabs, donated by a Stillwater mill owner, also went towards the construction of the roof, floor, and benches. The chapel cost no more than about $65 ($2,516 in 2025) in labor to build. Dedicated on November 1, 1841, the chapel was the first house of worship to be erected within the current city limits, with its cemetery being approximately at the present corner of Third and Minnesota streets. Galtier remarked that the chapel called to mind the "stable of Bethlehem".

While it is said that the area had up until that point been referred to as "Pig's Eye" or "Pig's Eye Landing" after the tavern of settler Pierre "Pig's Eye" Parrant, the landing by the chapel gradually became known as "Saint Paul's Landing". Through this the name of the chapel gradually was applied to the entire settlement, which would become the City of Saint Paul. A poem published in the Minnesota Pioneer on New Years Day, 1850, concluded:

When one great city covers all
The ground from Pig's Eye to the Falls
I then will claim Saint Paul for mine
The child of 1949.
Pig's Eye, converted, thou shalt be like Saul,
Arise; and be henceforth—Saint Paul!

While the last few lines of the poem have been attributed to Galtier as a speech at the dedication Mass of the chapel, the poem has been more commonly attributed to newspaper editor James M. Goodhue.

By 1843, the chapel had grown to 454 congregants. Galtier was transferred to Dubuque in 1844, and Father Augustin Ravoux replaced him as pastor. Ravoux enlarged the structure in 1847, adding another eighteen feet. In the winter of 1847/1848, a bell from the sunken steamship Argo was presented to Ravoux by Henry M. Rice and hung in a belfry beside the chapel. Prior to the establishment of a more formal cemetery in 1849, eleven people were buried about the grounds of the chapel.

When Joseph Crétin was appointed as the bishop of the newly established Diocese of St. Paul in July 1851, the log chapel became the first cathedral. Dismayed at the size of the building, Crétin said the chapel was "worse than a stable" and began construction on a new building. The chapel would only serve in the role of cathedral for a few months, as the larger, second cathedral took its place in December 1851. The first cathedral continued to be used for religious purposes, having begun to be used as a Sisters of St. Joseph school in November 1851. While originally only in the vestry, school enrollment rapidly climbed such that the whole building was used by April 1852. By the summer of 1852, a new brick school was built and the chapel went back to being used for worship as the sisters' chapel. A cholera epidemic in the summer of 1854 led to the chapel briefly being used as a hospital by the sisters prior to the construction of St. Joseph's Hospital.

The final years of the chapel are unclear. An account by The Catholic Bulletin stated that as the city grew and Third Street became a bustling thoroughfare, the "religious structures gave way and disappeared". One account gives a dismantling date of 1856, while another says that it was used as a convent chapel until 1864. One account says that the logs were brought to the site of Saint Joseph's Academy, where they were used in the construction of the school, or simply used for firewood by the workers. The writings of Lucien Galtier in 1874 indicate that the logs were safely stored to one day rebuild and preserve the chapel. An account published in 1889 in The Northwestern Chronicle stated the chapel was disassembled in 1856 and the logs numbered for eventual reconstruction and preserved at St. Joseph's Academy. Undisputed is that two gavels were made from the logs; one was given to the cathedral parish, and the other to the Minnesota Historical Society.

== Legacy ==
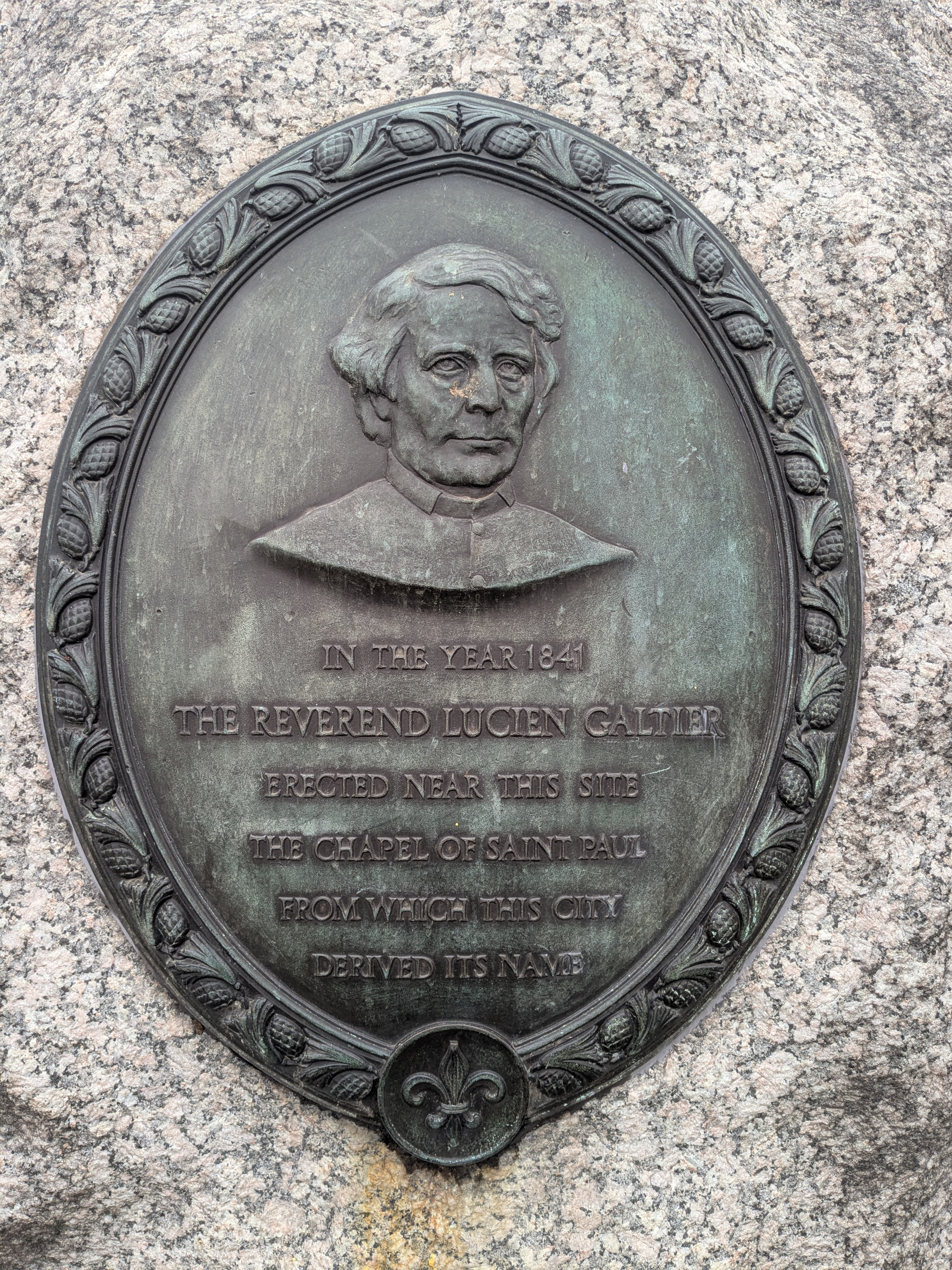
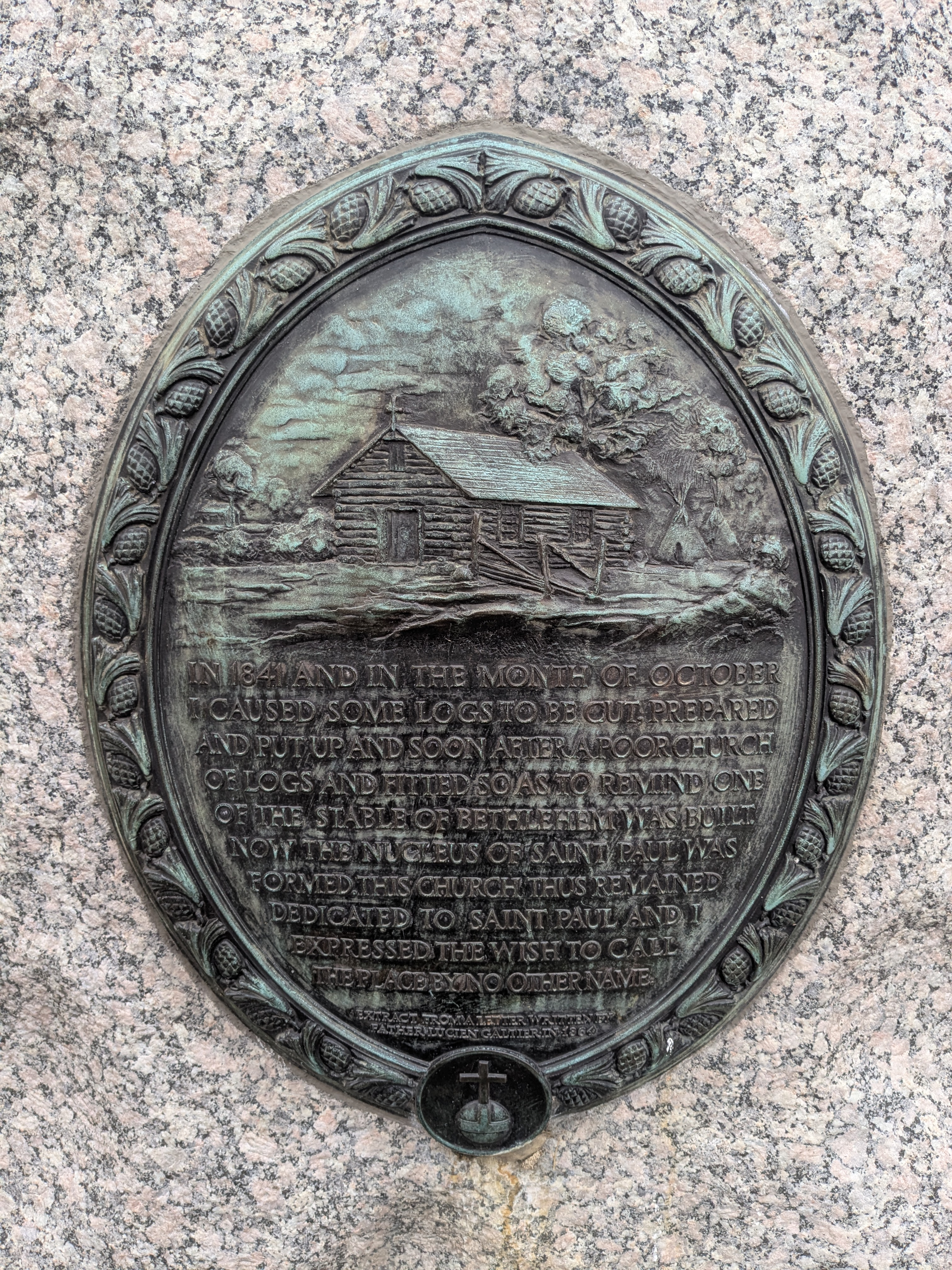
Modern-day commemorative plaques marking the approximate spot of the log chapel

The City of Saint Paul purchased the former location of the chapel from the archdiocese in March 1928. Several monuments mark the site at Kellogg Mall Park. Bronze plaques commemorating the chapel and Lucien Galtier are embedded in a large rock. Metal sculptures of a chapel, bell tower, and an axe-head commemorating the construction of the cathedral are also present in the park. A replica of the chapel exists in the present cathedral's museum. One of the gavels constructed from the logs, on loan from the Minnesota Historical Society, was used by Archbishop Bernard Hebda to ceremonially knock on the present cathedral doors at his installation as archbishop of Saint Paul and Minneapolis in 2016.
