= List of the oldest buildings in Minnesota =

This article lists the oldest extant buildings in Minnesota, including extant buildings and structures constructed before and during American rule over Minnesota. Only buildings built before 1860 are suitable for inclusion on this list, or the building must be the oldest of its type.

To qualify for the list, a structure must:

- be a recognizable building (defined as any human-made structure used or intended for supporting or sheltering any use or continuous occupancy);
- incorporate features of building work from the claimed date to at least 1.5 metres (4.9 ft) in height and/or be a listed building.

This consciously excludes ruins of limited height, roads and statues. Bridges may be included if they otherwise fulfill the above criteria. Dates for many of the oldest structures have been arrived at by radiocarbon dating or dendrochronology and should be considered approximate. If the exact year of initial construction is estimated, it will be shown as a range of dates.

== List of oldest buildings ==
Building	Image	Location	First built	Use	Notes
Round Tower at Fort Snelling		Fort Snelling (unorganized territory), Minnesota	1820	Military	Oldest building in Minnesota
Sibley House		Mendota, Minnesota	1835	Residence	Oldest stone house in Minnesota; Home of Henry Hastings Sibley.
Faribault House		Mendota, Minnesota	1839	Residence	Residence for fur trader Jean-Baptiste Faribault; made of stone.
Norway Lutheran Church		St. Paul, Minnesota	1843	Church	Oldest Protestant church building in Minnesota; moved to St. Paul from Wind Lake, Wisconsin in 1904
John and Martin Mower House		Arcola, Minnesota	1847	Residence	An early Greek Revival house in the St. Croix Valley
Banfill Tavern		Fridley, Minnesota	1847	Residence	Residence of John Banfill, an early state legislator
Ard Godfrey House		Minneapolis, Minnesota	c. 1848	Residence	Oldest house in Minneapolis.
Capt. John Oliver House		Lakeland, Minnesota	1849	Residence	Residence of Captain John Oliver, one of the early founders of Lakeland
1852 Town House School		Taylor Falls, Minnesota	1852	School/Town House	Oldest public school in Minnesota
Saint Peter's Church (Mendota, Minnesota)		Mendota Heights, Minnesota	1853	Church	Oldest church building built in Minnesota
Dupuis House		Mendota, Minnesota	1854	Residence	residence for Hypolite Dupuis.
Pierre Bottineau House		Maple Grove, Minnesota	1854	Residence	residence of frontiersman Pierre Bottineau
Paul Wolf Family Cabin		Nerstrand, MN	1855	Being Restored	Residence of the Paul Wolf family. Originally built in 1855 in what would become Big Woods State Park. Moved to Nerstrand, MN in 1856. In the process of being restored in Santiago Township, MN. https://www.southernminn.com/faribault_daily_news/news/1855-nerstrand-cabin-saved-by-pioneers-descendent-moved-for-preservation/article_45174c8c-07ac-4bb2-8460-0fb16c66cd2a.html
Justus Ramsey Stone House		Saint Paul, Minnesota	1855–57	Residence	One of oldest houses in St. Paul
Woodbury House		Anoka, Minnesota	1857	Residence	Residence of Dwight Woodbury, an early settler of Anoka
Sheldon Hall aka The Beehive		Excelsior, MN	1857	Current: Residence	Previously: University of St. Thomas dormitory (Relocated from Minneapolis MN)

== See also ==
- National Register of Historic Places listings in Minnesota
- History of Minnesota
- Oldest buildings in the United States
