= Saint Peter's Church (Mendota, Minnesota) =

St. Peter's Church
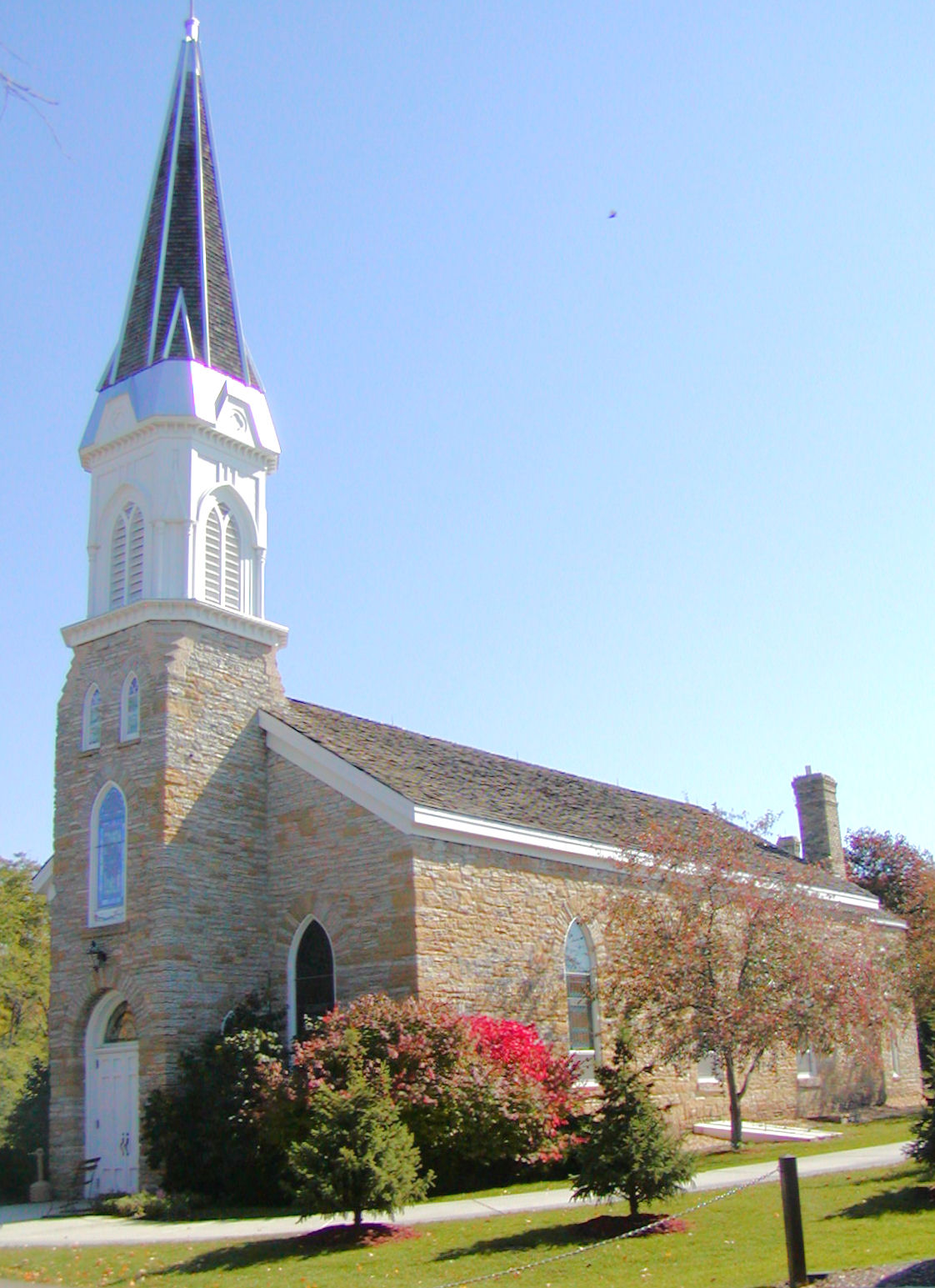
- The stone church and steeple

- Location within Minnesota
- 44°53′9″N 93°10′7″W
- Location: Mendota Heights, Minnesota
- Country: United States
- Denomination: Roman Catholic
- Website: www.stpetersmendota.org

History
- Founded: 1840
- Founder: Lucien Galtier

Architecture
- Years built: 1853
- Construction cost: $4,425 ($171,248 in 2025)

Administration
- Archdiocese: Archdiocese of Saint Paul and Minneapolis

Clergy
- Archbishop: Bernard Hebda
- Pastor: Steven Hoffman
- St. Peter's Church
- U.S. Historic district – Contributing property
- Part of: Mendota Historic District (ID70000293)
- Added to NRHP: June 22, 1970

St. Peter's Catholic Church in Mendota Heights (Note: While originally founded in the area known as Mendota (from the Dakota "Bdóte"), the church now is situationed in the incorporated city of Mendota Heights, which was established in 1956.) is the oldest church in continuous use in the U.S. state of Minnesota. Established as a community in 1840, a log church was built in 1842, and the still-standing historic church was constructed in 1853. A modern parish building now serves as the worship site for the community, but the historic church is still used for various liturgies.

== History ==
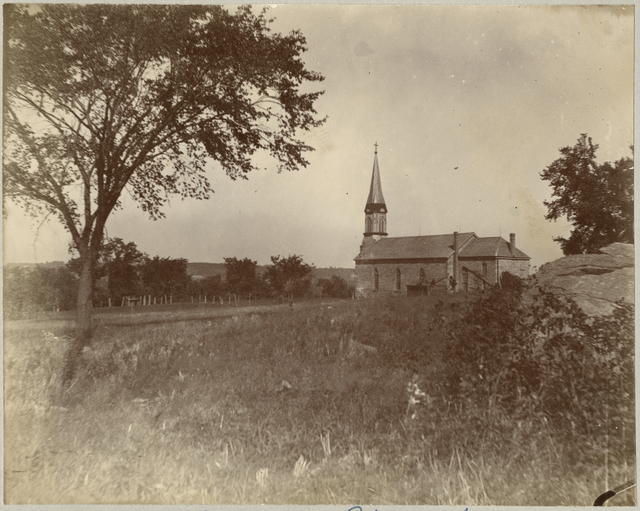
The church c. 1890

=== Parish beginnings ===
Bishop Mathias Loras of the Roman Catholic Archdiocese of Dubuque, whose territory Minnesota was in at the time, sent Lucien Galtier in 1840 to minister to Catholics at Fort Snelling. Galtier established St. Peter's parish across the river from Fort Snelling in Mendota (Bdóte) at the confluence of the Minnesota and Mississippi rivers.

Before a church building was constructed, Catholics first worshipped in a house owned by Jean-Baptiste Faribault. While Galtier was on a missionary tour in Wisconsin in the summer of 1842, the house collapsed, nearly killing Father Augustin Ravoux who was taking care of the parish at the time. The house was replaced by a log church which was dedicated on October 2, 1842. Ravoux became the pastor in 1844, a position that he held until 1857. He alternated between the log chapels of Saint Paul and Saint Peter, only taking up full-time residence at Mendota once Joseph Cretin became bishop and took control of the newly designated cathedral log chapel of Saint Paul in 1851.

=== Historic church ===
Ravoux was kept busy as a full-time pastor; in his first five-and-a-half years, Ravoux celebrated almost 500 baptisms, 100 weddings, and 65 funerals. The growing congregation required a larger worship space than the log church, and in 1853 the limestone Church of Saint Peter was constructed at a cost of $4,425 ($171,248 in 2025). The rear of the church contained living quarters for the priests.

The log building formerly serving as the church became the parish school until it was torn down in 1896 to make room for a railroad line. At that point, the Sibley House became the school until 1910. A larger bell tower was added in 1880. In 1903–1904 the parish reduced the size of the balcony and excavated under the floor to add heating plant. The stained glass windows were also added in 1904. The steeple was destroyed by a storm in 1951 and replaced in 1954. A new school building was built in 1956–1957.

=== Current status ===
In 1972, due to declining enrollment and the need for a larger sanctuary for the community, the school was closed and converted into a church. The larger church building was completed in 1991. The historic church underwent a major renovation in 1975, with disrepair seriously threatening the structural integrity of the church. The renovations were completed in 1978, costing $284,000 ($1.4 million in 2025). In addition to being structurally strengthened, the church was remodeled to appear how it would have looked in the 1890s. The 1954 steeple was removed and replaced by one modeling the late-19th century bell tower, the floor was redone, and paintings on the walls were restored.

The historic church remains standing and open for tours and is used for Eucharistic adoration, daily Mass, weddings, and funerals. At the time it was established, it was the fifth Catholic church that had been constructed in Minnesota; however, it is the only one that remains and is the oldest church of any denomination in continuous use in the state.

== Historic recognition ==
The Department of the Interior named the church a historic building in 1935. The church was added to the National Register of Historic Places as part of the Mendota Historic District in 1970.

== Gallery ==
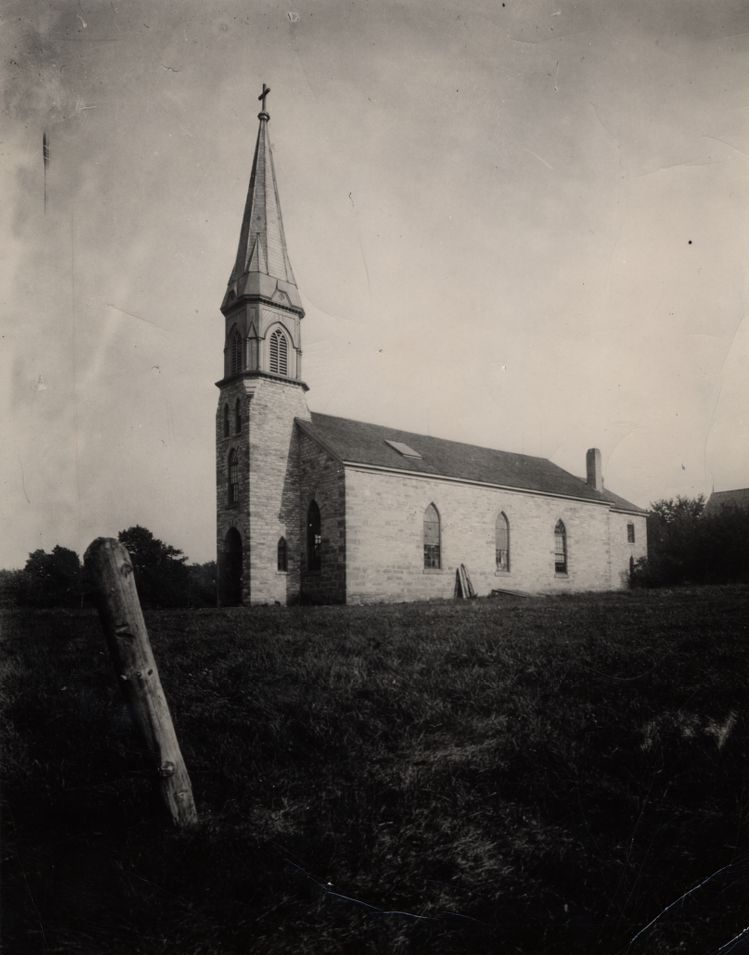
The church c. 1880

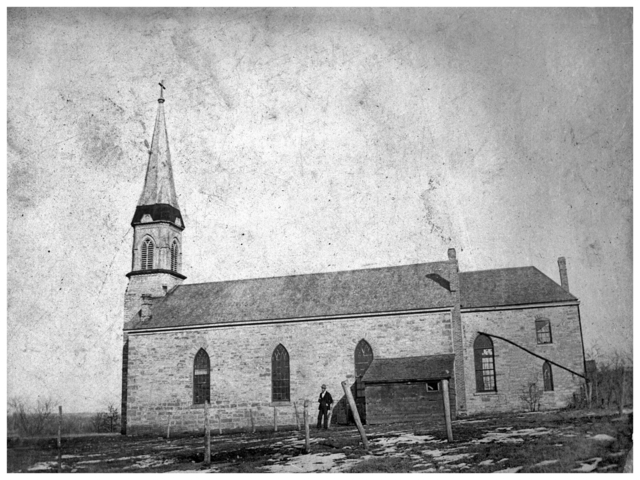
The church c. 1885

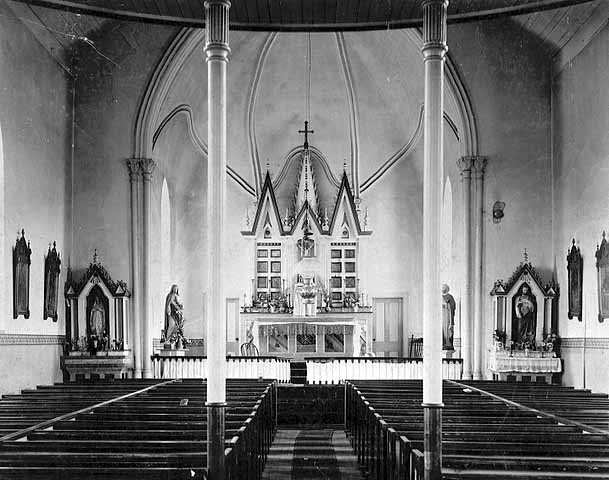
The church interior c. 1899

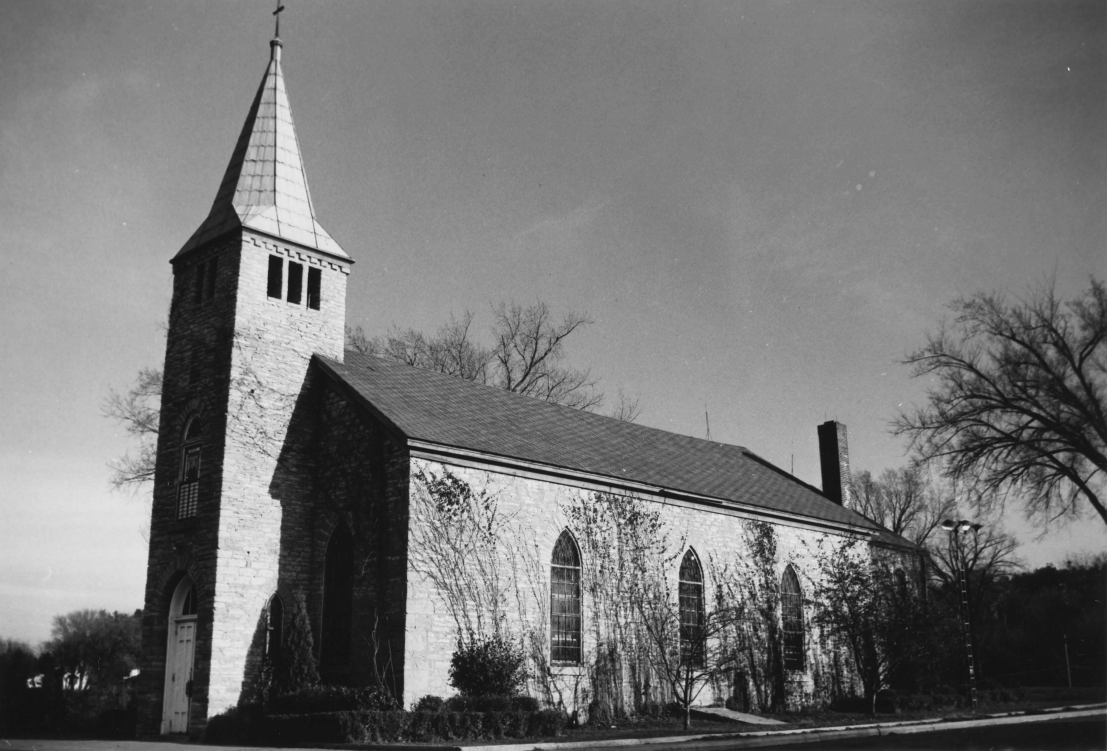
The church as it appeared in 1969 with the 1954 steeple

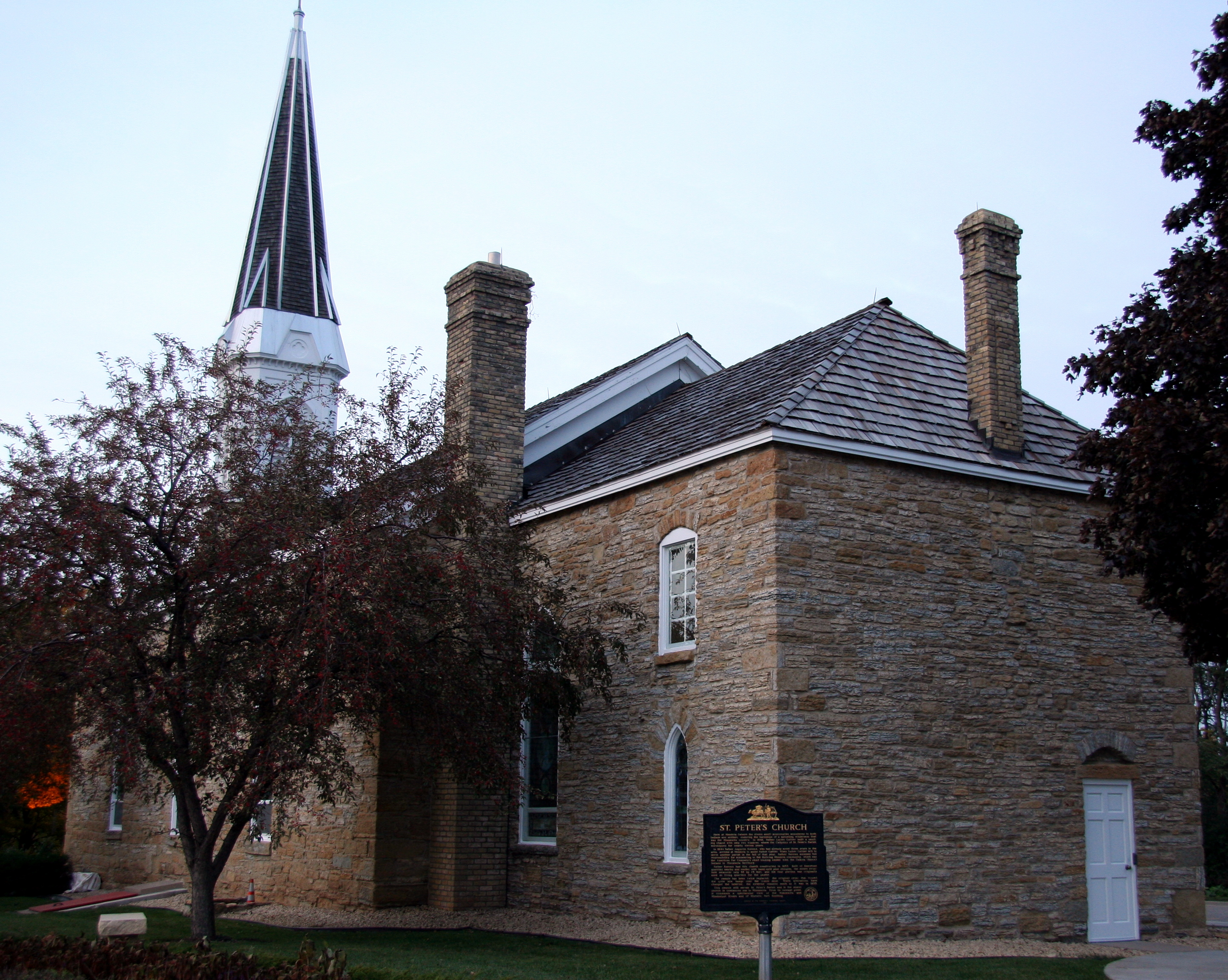
The back of the church, which was formerly the living quarters for priests

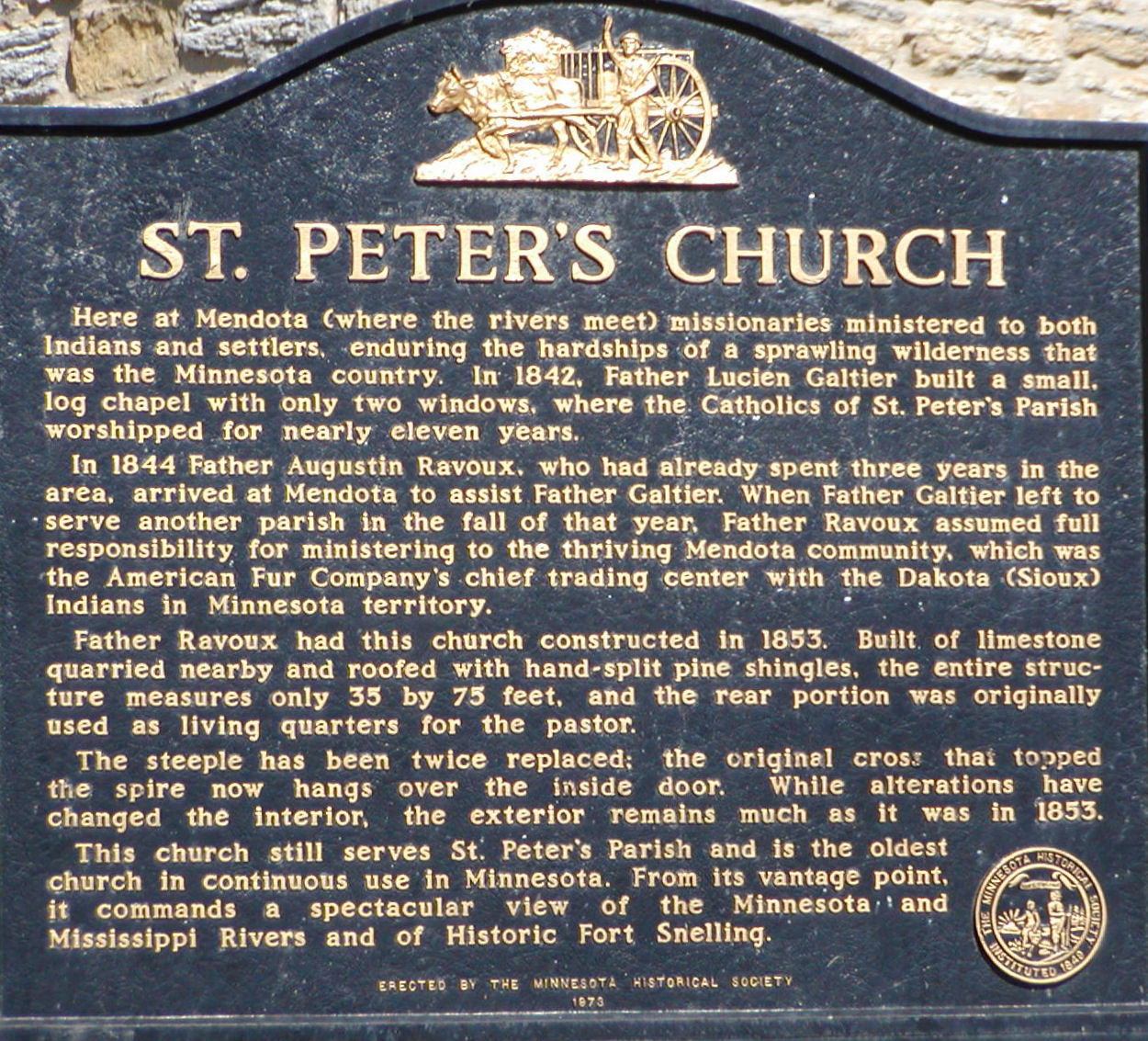
History plaque at the church
Department of the Interior diagrams of the historic church

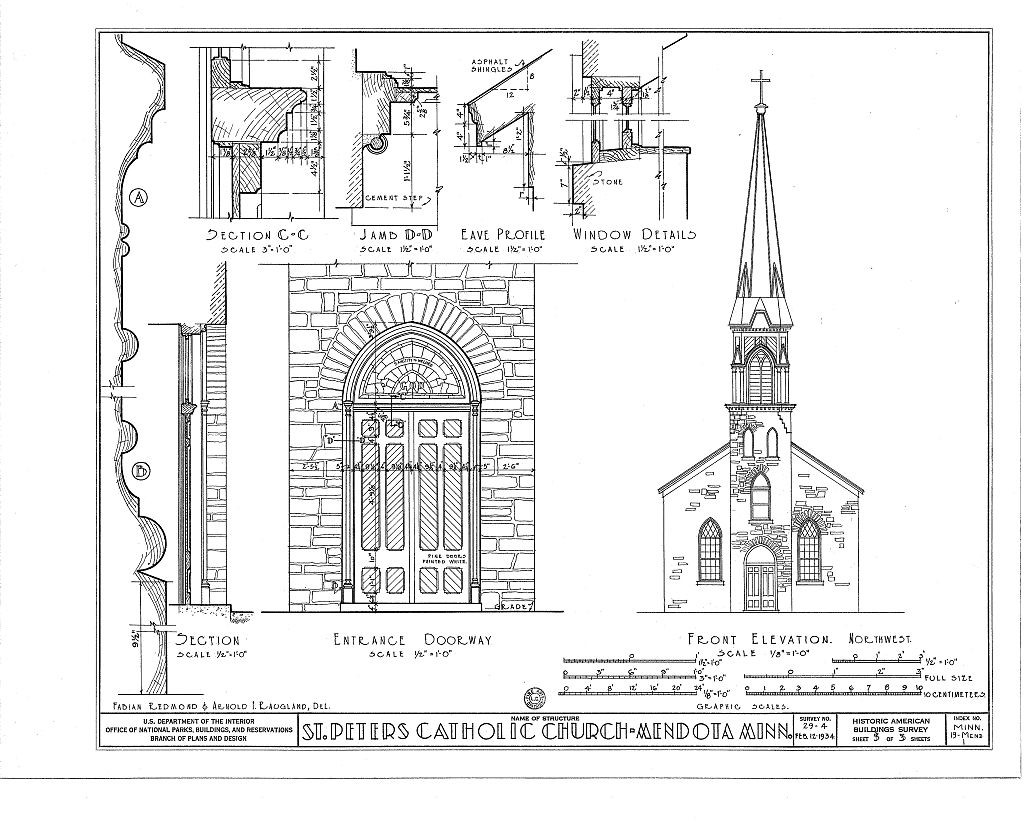

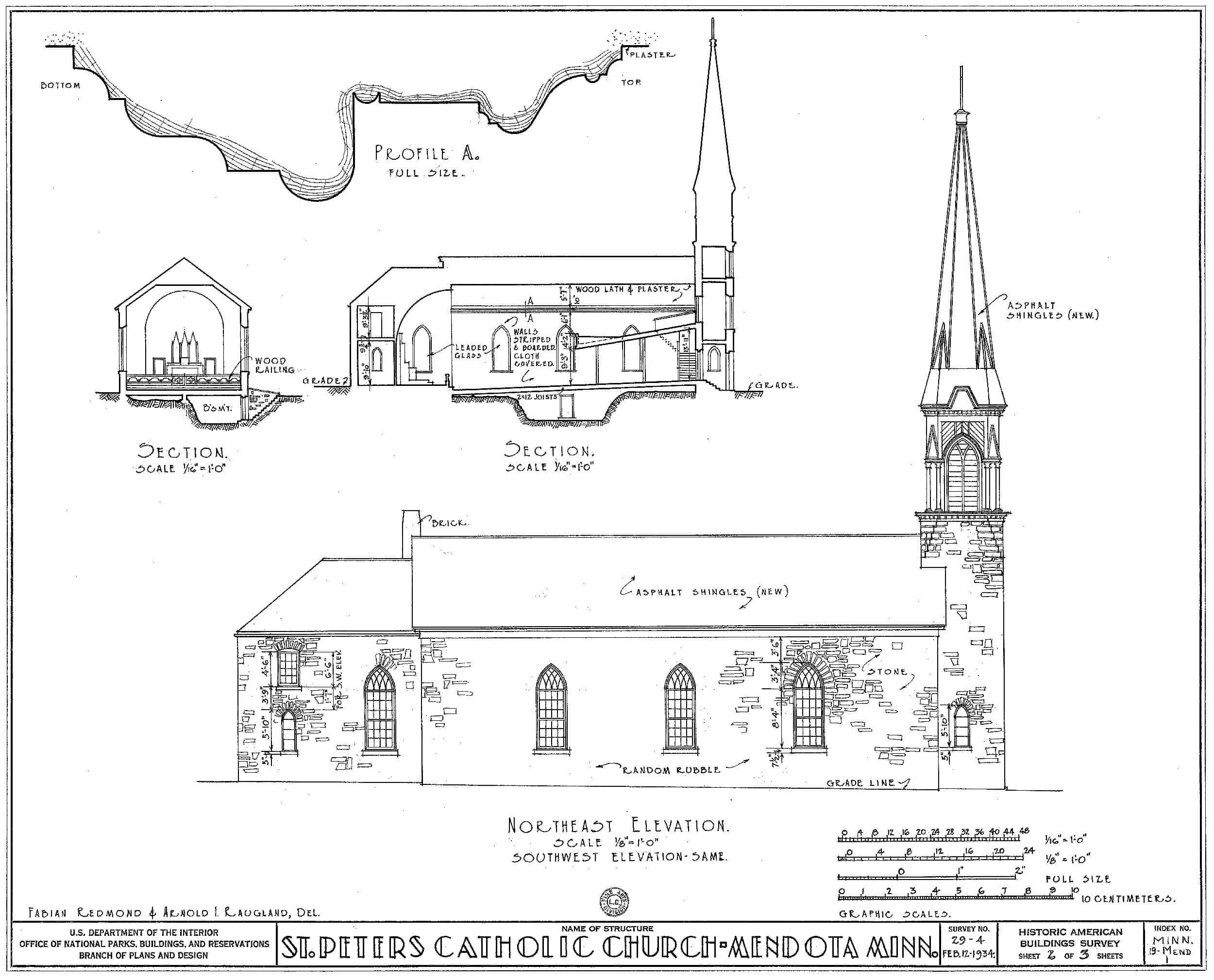

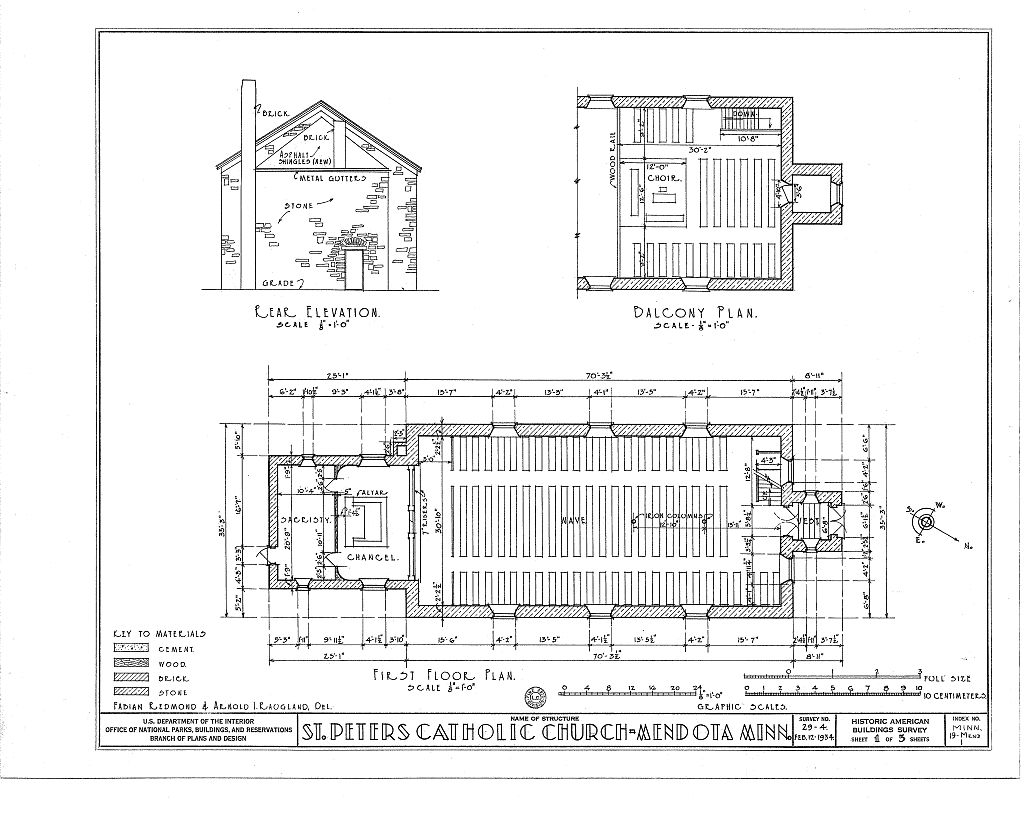

== See also ==
- List of the oldest buildings in Minnesota
