= Mitchell Jackson Farmhouse =

Historic house in Minnesota, United States

- U.S. National Register of Historic Places
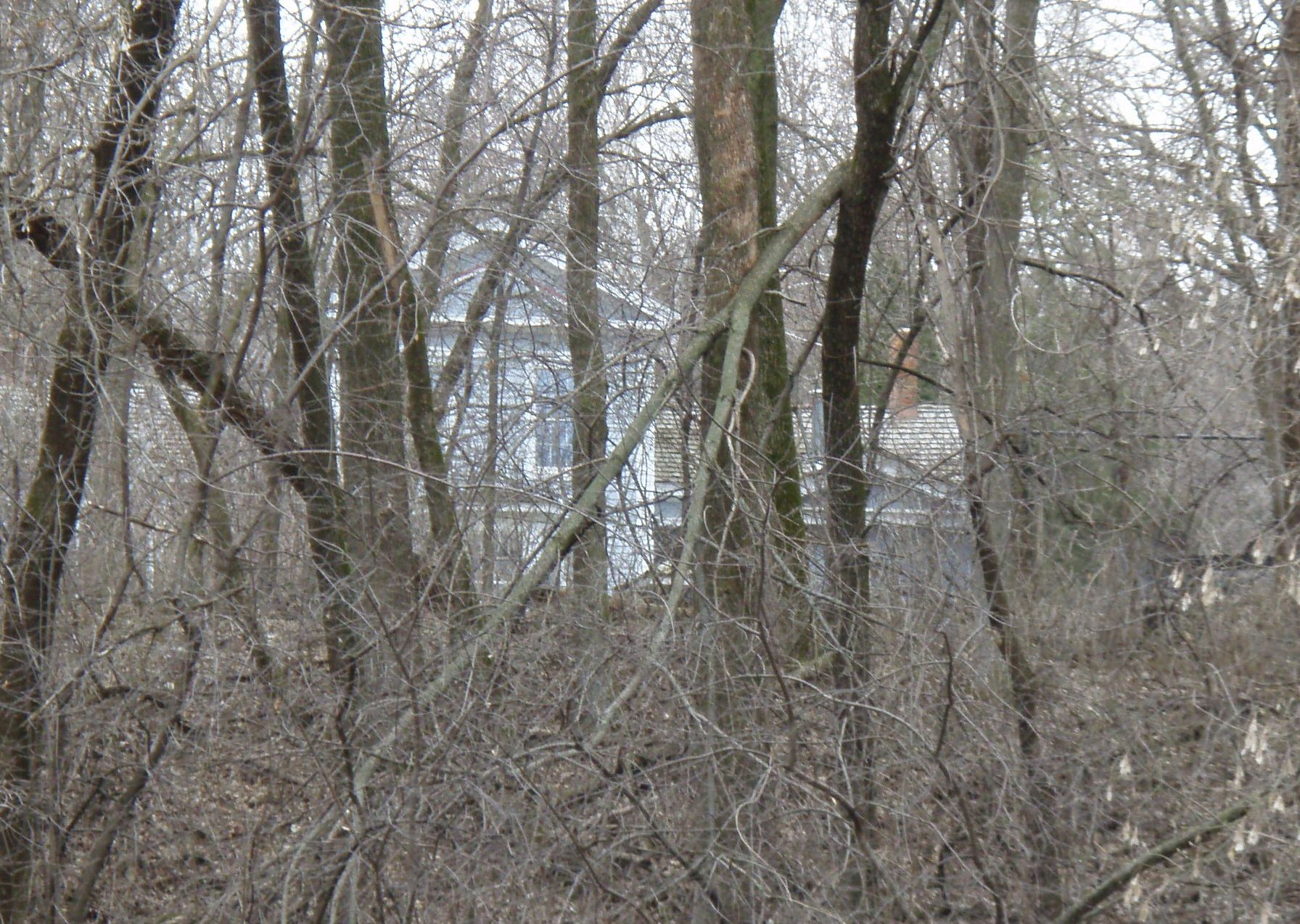
- The Mitchell Jackson Farmhouse just visible through heavy brush

- Location within Minnesota Location within the United States
- Location: 16376 7th Street Lane South, Lakeland, Minnesota
- Coordinates: 44°56′14″N 92°46′34″W
- Area: 2.5 acres (1.0 ha)
- Built: c. 1850
- Architectural style: Greek Revival
- MPS: Washington County MRA (AD)
- NRHP reference No.: 82003075
- Designated: February 19, 1982

The Mitchell Jackson Farmhouse is a historic house in Lakeland, Minnesota, United States. It was built around 1850. Its second owner, in residence from 1854 to 1871, was Mitchell Jackson (1816–1900). While farming the surrounding property Jackson kept a wide-ranging diary that remains a valuable primary source on early Minnesota settlement. The house was listed on the National Register of Historic Places in 1982 for its local significance in the themes of agriculture and exploration/settlement. It was nominated for its association with Jackson, whose "acute perceptions and wide range of observations place him above the ordinary farm diarist", in the words of Rodney C. Loehr, who edited Jackson's diaries for publication in 1939.

== See also ==
- National Register of Historic Places listings in Washington County, Minnesota
