= Ard Godfrey House =

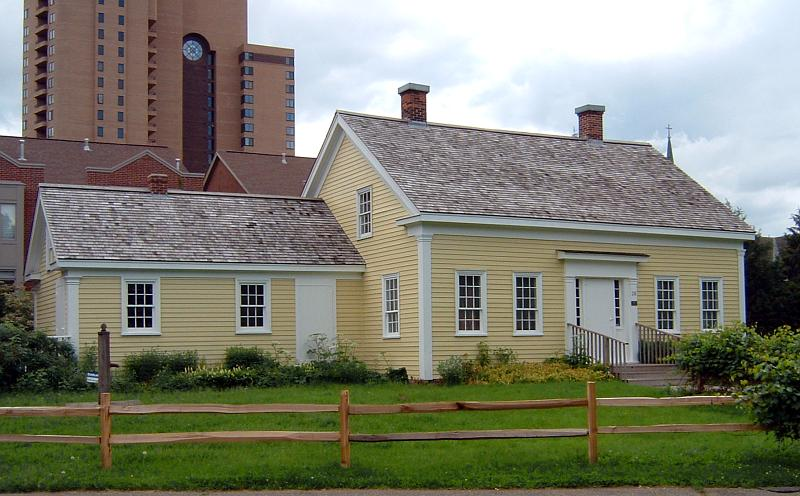
- The Ard Godfrey House in 2005
- Established: 1849
- Location: 28 University Ave. SE; Minneapolis, Minnesota 55414; USA
- Coordinates: 44.98658°N 93.25570°W
- Type: Historic house museum
- Website: website

The Ard Godfrey House is a historic house located in Minneapolis, Minnesota. It is the oldest surviving wood-frame house in Minneapolis.

== History ==
The Ard Godfrey House was built in 1849 by Ard Godfrey after Godfrey came to the area to supervise the construction of a dam and a lumber mill at Saint Anthony Falls. Godfrey and his family lived in the house until 1853. Several other families lived in the house until 1905, when the house was sold to the Hennepin County Territorial Pioneers Association.

In 1909, the house was relocated to its current location in Chute Square and given to the City of Minneapolis. The house was used as a museum of historical artifacts until 1943 when it was closed due to lack of funding. The house was renovated by the Woman's Club of Minneapolis in 1976 and has been open to public tours since 1979. A replica of the house's kitchen wing was opened in 1985.

== See also ==
- List of the oldest buildings in Minnesota
