= Justus Ramsey Stone House =

Historic house in Minnesota, United States

- U.S. National Register of Historic Places
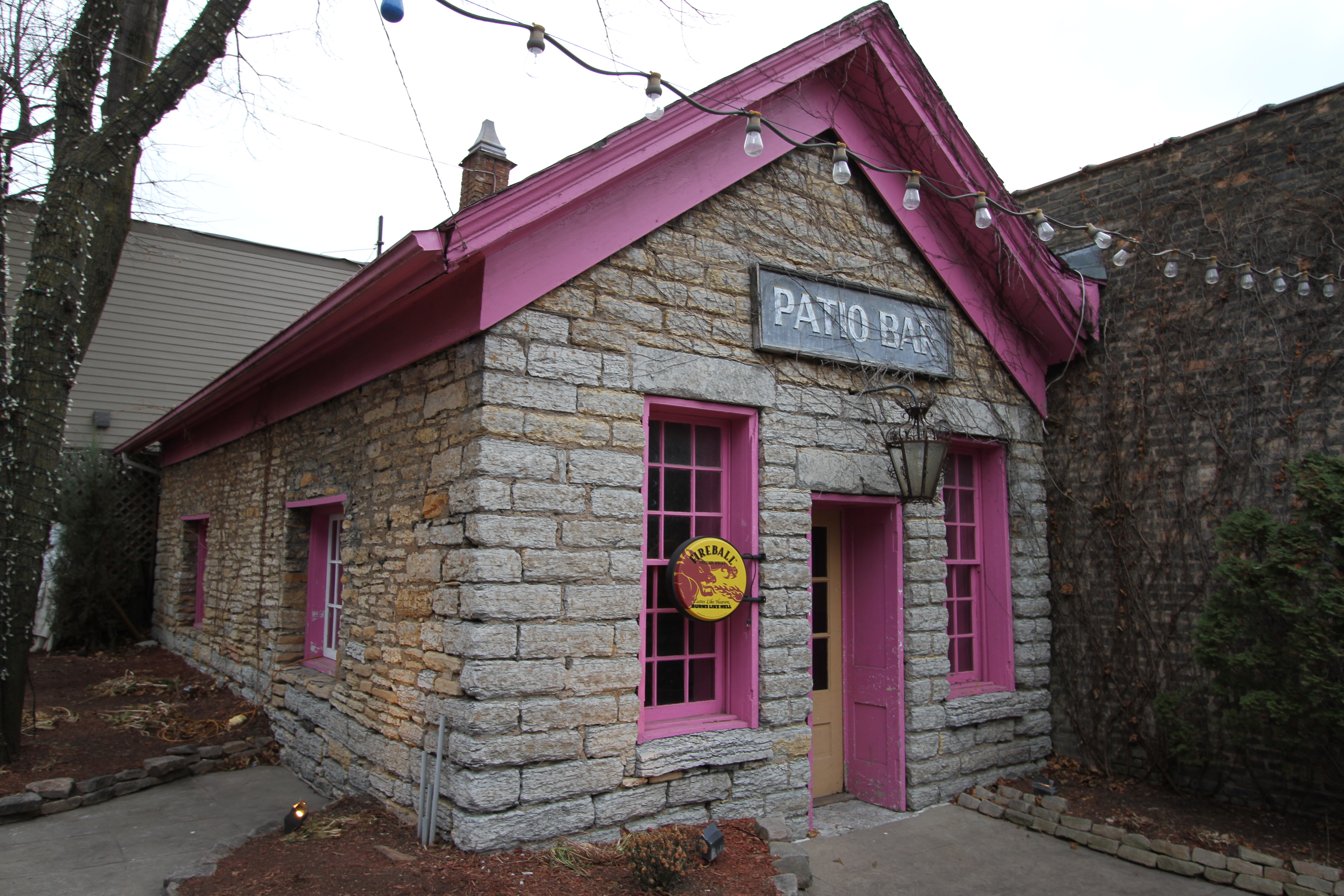
- The Justus Ramsey Stone House in 2017

- Location within Minnesota Location within the United States
- Location: 252 7th Street West, Saint Paul, Minnesota
- Coordinates: 44°56′33″N 93°6′16.5″W
- Area: Less than 1 acre (0.40 ha)
- Built: 1855–57
- Architectural style: Greek Revival
- NRHP reference No.: 75001014
- Added to NRHP: May 6, 1975

The Justus Ramsey Stone House was one of the oldest known houses still standing in Saint Paul in the U.S. state of Minnesota. The house, located at 252 West 7th Street is listed on the National Register of Historic Places. The home is an example of a Saint Paul residence of a settler of some financial means.

== Justus Ramsey ==
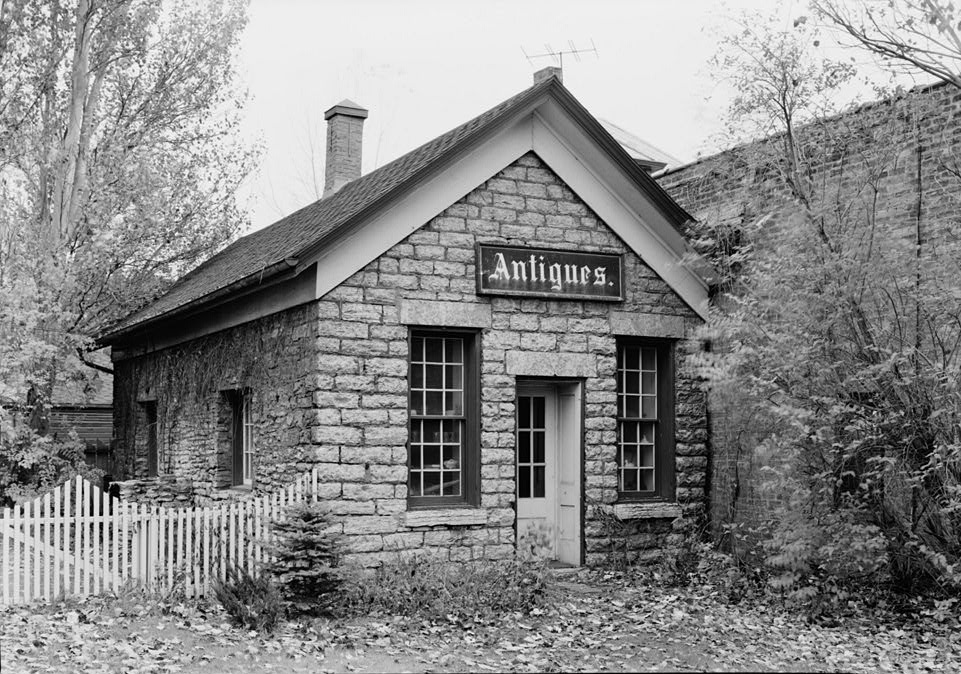
The building as an antique store in 1960

Justus Cornelius Ramsey was born in Hummelstown, Dauphin County, Pennsylvania and learned the printer's trade. He was first employed as a surveyor for the Pennsylvania Railroad, then came to Saint Paul in 1849 where he engaged in the grocery business and in real estate. He was the younger brother of the first governor of Minnesota Territory, Alexander Ramsey. In 1850, he was elected to the Minnesota Territorial Legislature and served for three terms; he also served in other governmental posts, including carrying the treaty payment to the Dakota when the Dakota War of 1862 erupted.

The 35-acre (14 ha) parcel including 252 West 7th Street was purchased by Henry Hastings Sibley, Henry M. Rice, and Justus Ramsey for $60.00 in 1849. The land was subdivided in 1850, and Justus Ramsey kept the title to the lot where this two-room house was built; it is believed that he initially lived in the home. It was constructed with 2-foot-thick light gray quarry-faced limestone walls, ashlar-coursed with lime mortar. In 1859, Ramsey lost or sold the home, after which it served as a barber shop and a residence.

Ramsey died by suicide in 1881, leaving behind a fortune of $200,000.

== Other residents ==
=== Robert A. Smith ===
One of the earliest occupants of the Justus Ramsey House was Robert A. Smith, who arrived in St. Paul in 1853 to serve as a secretary to his brother-in-law, Territorial Governor Willis A. Gorman. Smith went on to hold subsequent government positions at the territorial, county, and city level.

Smith was elected to the city council in 1883 and served until 1887. He was elected to the Minnesota Legislature in 1884 and served one term. He was then elected to the Minnesota Senate and served 1887-1890. He was appointed mayor of St. Paul in 1887 to complete the term of a mayor who had resigned. He served as mayor until 1892, when he lost the election, but after that term, he was elected again and served from 1894-1896 when he was appointed Postmaster. He resigned from that after four years to go back to being St. Paul mayor, serving from 1900-1908. He ran for lieutenant governor in 1902, but was not elected. In 1910 he was elected a Ramsey County Commissioner and held the position until his death in 1913.

=== Munger brothers ===
The Munger brothers, Russel Munger and Roger Munger, also lived in the house.

During the late nineteenth century, amateur brass bands were very popular in America. In 1856, the Munger brothers, Russell and Roger, started the Old Gents’ Band, the first military band in Minnesota. The Old Gents’ Band merged with the Pioneer Guards Band, and from this, the Great Western Band of St. Paul (GWB) was formed in 1860. Russell C. Munger (1837–1901), co-owner of the Munger Brothers Music Store in downtown St. Paul, was well qualified to lead the band due to his musical abilities. Munger led it for seven years, after which George Seibert (1836–1897), a band member, became the leader.

Roger Munger married Olive Gray in 1858 and they moved to Duluth. Through his entrepreneurship, Munger bought a sawmill and built another, got a coal dock going and a grain elevator. Serving on the school board and the city council, he continued projects with the development of an opera house, flour mill and board of trade. He was part of cutting a shipping canal across Minnesota Point and also involved with the Spaulding Hotel.

=== Early African American citizens of Saint Paul ===
Between the late 1890s until 1933, almost all the residents of the house were Black men, women and children. From 1900 to 1908, the cottage was the home of George and Maria Perkins, formerly enslaved people from Kentucky and South Carolina respectively. George worked as a porter for the Pullman Company, headquartered in Chicago, while Maria raised the couple’s sole surviving child—three others had died. During later times the small two-room home served as a multi-tenant boarding house. In 1920, John and Daisy Hall lived there with Hattie Key, her daughter Lucy, and Hattie’ sister Alice Dean, all from Alabama, together with a lodger from Tennessee named Charles Alexander. Hattie and her daughter both worked as maids, Charles as a construction worker, and John Hall as a butcher for Armour Packing Co.10 At other times the house supported the one-story wood-framed retail shop that was built in front in about 1915 —as when in 1919, Lizzie Battles operated the latter as a hairdresser and millinery shop while residing in the stone house. In the decades between, the city directories list numerous other residents, most apparently unrelated and having a variety of occupations such as waiter, domestic servant, janitor, rail car cleaner, dishwasher, hairdresser and laborer.

=== Pullman Porters and the railroad ===
But by far the most common occupation of residents of the Justus Ramsey House was that of porter—specifically, railway porters. An astonishing number boarded there. In addition to George Perkins, boarders Lee Barber, James Thomas, and Charles Alexander also worked for the Pullman Company. Monroe Duncan, C.S. Page, Curtis James, Henry Reed, William Hines, and Victor Towles all worked as porters for Great Northern Railway; William Manning worked for Chicago Great Western Railway; and the employers of porters Dixon Woods, George Williams, Charles Parker and Joseph Lewers were not specified in the directories. The history of the Pullman Company and of Black railroad porters generally is a major historical context in its own right. At its peak, Saint Paul’s Union Depot served more than 280 trains and 20,000 passengers daily, and was a point of entry and major employer of Black job-seekers. Although most porters were confined to menial roles, their combined efforts ultimately formed the nation’s first Black labor union ever to sign a collective bargaining agreement, thereby securing improved working conditions and a degree of upward mobility. "Moreover, (r)egardless of job status, black station employees were important ambassadors. They were often the first friendly face for a new arrival, and their networks of information about where to find shelter and a good meal were invaluable." Porters typically travelled the rails for 400 hours or more per month covering as many as 11,000 miles. It is little wonder that census-takers and city directory writers often missed them at home.

== Demolition ==
Moe Sharif (Mojtaba Sharifkhani) became the owner of the historic property in 2010. The stone house sat on the property of the restaurant which he bought and renamed Burger Moe's. Sharif is also the owner of the restaurant property across the street, the Downtowner Woodfire Grill.

In September 2022, Sharif reported that the north wall of the stone house had collapsed and he filed for a demolition permit from the City of Saint Paul. The Saint Paul Heritage Preservation Commission denied the demolition permit in December in order for historic preservation committees to seek alternate options for preserving the landmark stone house. In January 2023, Mayor Melvin Carter granted the demolition permit. A restraining order, sought by representatives of Historic Saint Paul, halted the demolition long enough to make plans to dismantle and store the stone house until further preservation efforts could be solidified.

Under agreement with preservationists, deconstruction of the Stone House began in February of 2023. The West 7th-Fort Road Federation solicited bids to reconstruct the house somewhere in Saint Paul. Early in 2026, reconstruction of the house began on the grounds of the Minnesota Transportation Museum.

== See also ==
- List of the oldest buildings in Minnesota
