= John T. Cyphers House =

Historic house in Minnesota, United States

- U.S. National Register of Historic Places
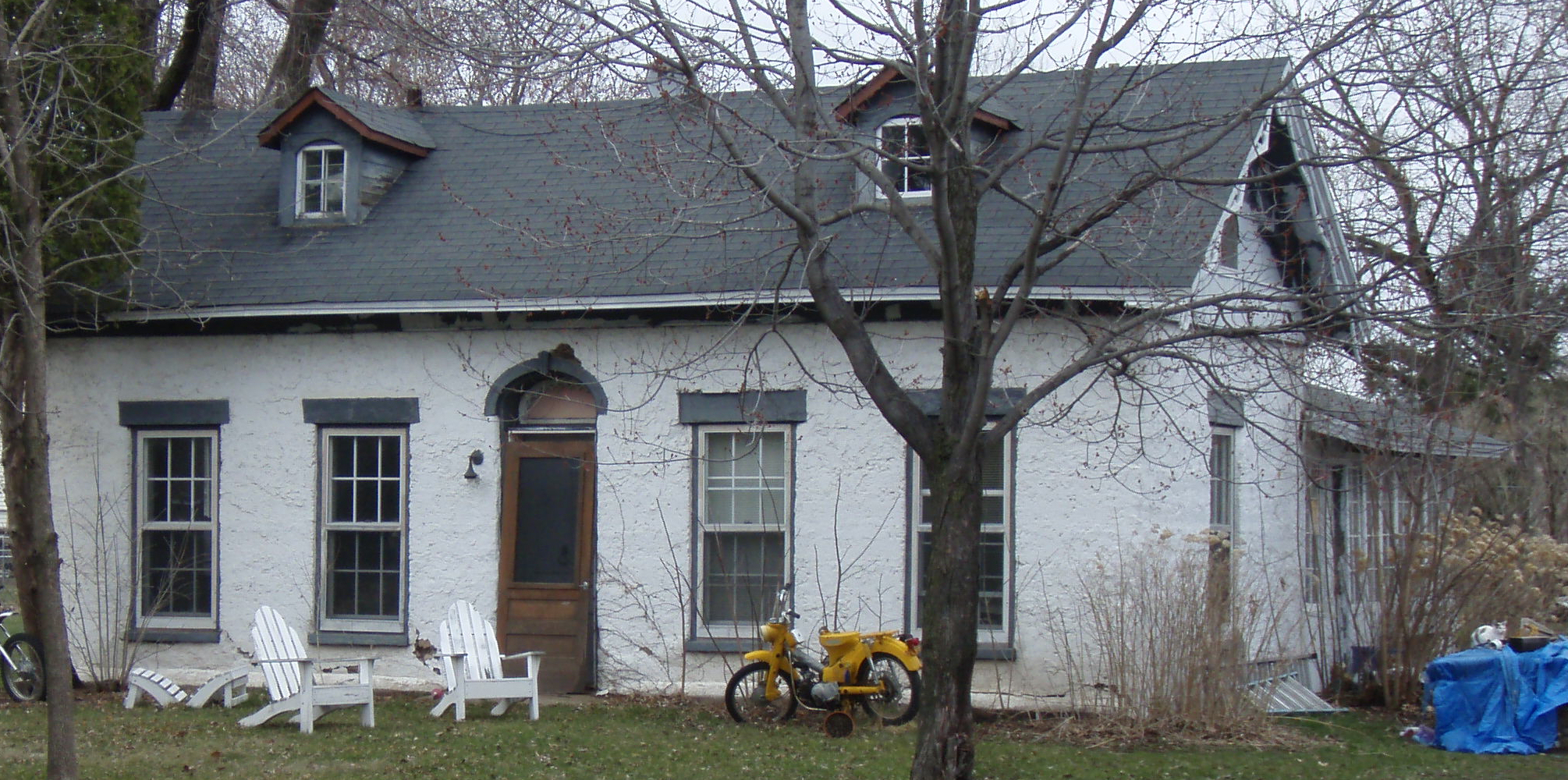
- The John T. Cyphers House from the southwest

- Location within Minnesota Location within the United States
- Location: 661 Quinnell Avenue North, Lakeland, Minnesota
- Coordinates: 44°57′29.5″N 92°45′59″W
- Area: 1 acre (0.40 ha)
- Built: 1858
- Architect: John T. Cyphers
- Architectural style: Gothic Revival
- MPS: Washington County MRA (AD)
- NRHP reference No.: 71000442
- Designated NRHP: September 10, 1971

The John T. Cyphers House is a historic house in Lakeland, Minnesota, United States. It was built in 1858 using an early form of concrete poured around undressed rock. It was listed on the National Register of Historic Places in 1971 for having state-level significance in the theme of architecture. It was nominated as a rare Minnesota example of Northern European-style masonry, particularly unusual in a logging region with plentiful lumber.

== Construction ==
Early Lakeland settler John T. Cyphers read an article in an 1855 edition of the St. Paul Pioneer Press suggesting a concrete mixture as a building material. This mixture, known at the time as "grout", comprised lime, sand, mud, and gravel. In 1858 Cyphers began constructing a house for himself using this method. He formed the core of the walls with small, undressed boulders. He outlined the two-foot-thick walls with wooden frames and poured in the grout. The principle walls were all built this way, but above the first story the gables, roof, and dormers are all wood.

== Description ==
The John T. Cyphers House is a small, one-story cottage with a lower wing projecting from the rear. The main entrance is centered on the long west façade, flanked symmetrically by a pair of windows on either side. Directly above the windows are two dormers projecting from the roof, mirrored by another two dormers facing the rear. The house is largely plain, but there are Gothic Revival decorations in an arch above the door, arched windows on the gable ends, and rusticated wooden trim. Much of this trim is covered up by modern roofing material, and the carved bargeboards are gone. A 20th-century owner recoated the outer walls to prevent spalling of the original grout.

== See also ==
- National Register of Historic Places listings in Washington County, Minnesota
