= Justus Cornelius Ramsey =

American politician (1821–1881)

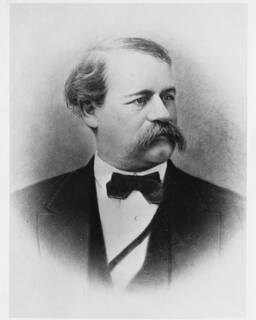
Justus Ramsey

Justus Cornelius Ramsey (June 13, 1821 – January 24, 1881) was an American businessman and politician. Born in Hummelstown, Pennsylvania, Ramsey moved to Saint Paul, Minnesota Territory in 1849. He was in the real estate and grocery business. A Republican, he served in the Minnesota Territorial House of Representatives in 1851, 1853, and 1857.

== Family and death ==
His brother, Alexander Ramsey, served as the first Governor of Minnesota Territory, the second governor of the state of Minnesota, and the 34th United States Secretary of War.

Ramsey never married. He suffered from dyspepsia, heart disease and depression. He died from a bullet wound in his brain while living in Saint Paul, Minnesota, which was ruled a suicide.

== Legacy ==
Ramsey's home on 252 West Seventh Street in Saint Paul, the Justus Ramsey Stone House, is now one of the oldest still standing in the city. It is listed on the National Register of Historic Places.
