= Captain John Oliver House =

Historic house in Minnesota, United States

- Capt. John Oliver House
- U.S. National Register of Historic Places
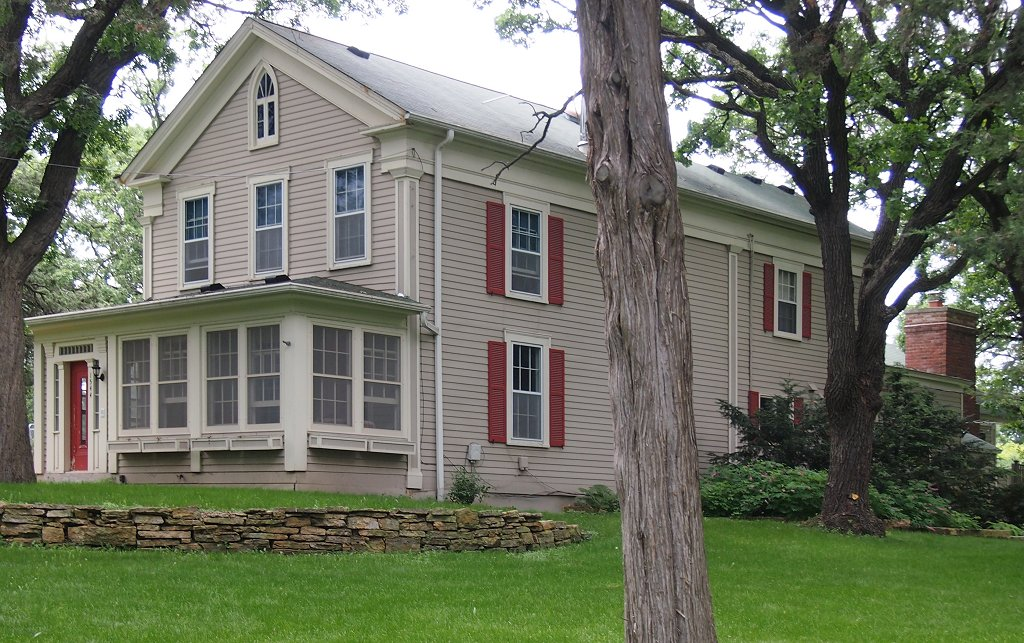
- The Captain John Oliver House from the northeast

- Location within Minnesota Location within the United States
- Location: 1544 Rivercrest Road, Lakeland, Minnesota
- Coordinates: 44°58′16.3″N 92°46′19.3″W
- Area: Less than one acre
- Built: 1849
- Architectural style: Greek Revival
- MPS: Washington County MRA (AD)
- NRHP reference No.: 77000772
- Designated NRHP: December 16, 1977

The Captain John Oliver House, nicknamed Cedarlawn, is a historic house in Lakeland, Minnesota, United States, built in 1849. It was listed on the National Register of Historic Places in 1977 for having local significance in the themes of architecture and exploration/settlement. It was nominated for its association with the settlement and organization of the Lakeland area and as a rare surviving example of mid-19th-century Greek Revival architecture in Minnesota.

== Description ==
The Captain John Oliver House is a two-story building with clapboard siding. Greek Revival elements include corner pilasters with simple entablatures topped by gable-end pediments, dog-eared window moulding, and a front door flanked with small pilasters, a transom window, and sidelights. There is also an arched Gothic Revival window in the center of the front gable.

The house has been expanded with a front porch and additions to the side and rear, but retains its original architectural features.

== History ==
John Oliver was an Englishman who attained the rank of captain in the British Royal Navy before emigrating to Massachusetts in 1820. He worked as a maritime pilot on Boston Harbor for over two decades, then relocated to Minnesota. He and his family were among the first settlers of Lakeland Township in 1848. Oliver operated a ferry on the St. Croix River between Lakeland and Hudson, Wisconsin, from 1850 until his death in 1869. His sons George and Charles were instrumental in organizing the town government of Lakeland while another son, John Oliver, Jr., founded the local school.

== See also ==
- National Register of Historic Places listings in Washington County, Minnesota
