= Lakeland, Minnesota =

City in Minnesota, United States

Lakeland
- City
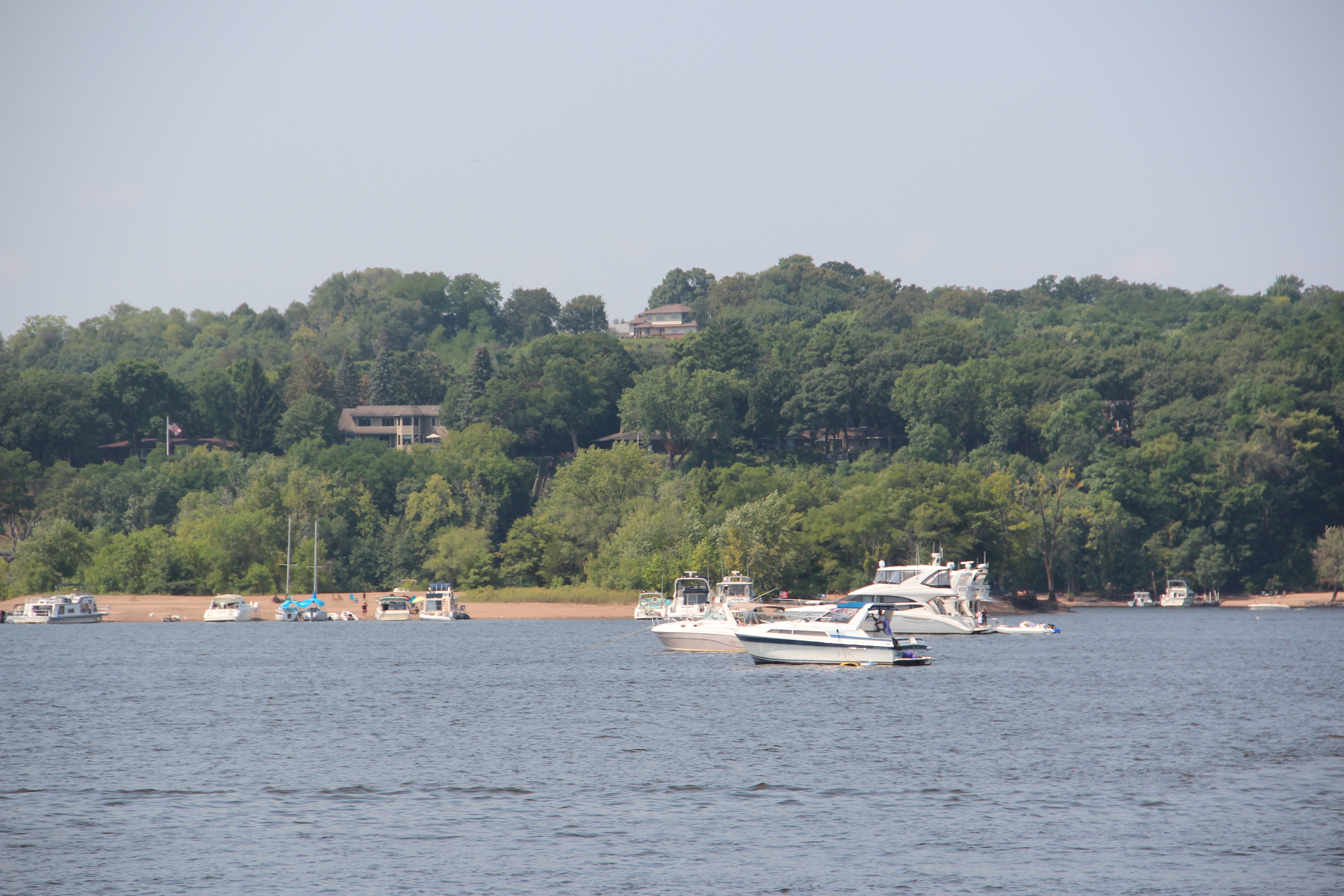
- Houses in Lakeland viewed from Hudson, Wisconsin

- Location of the city of Lakeland within Washington County, Minnesota
- Coordinates: 44°57′13″N 92°46′12″W
- Country: United States
- State: Minnesota
- County: Washington

Area
  - Total: 2.92 sq mi (7.57 km^{2})
  - Land: 2.07 sq mi (5.37 km^{2})
  - Water: 0.85 sq mi (2.19 km^{2})
- Elevation: 676 ft (206 m)

Population (2020)
  - Total: 1,710
  - Density: 824.3/sq mi (318.26/km^{2})
- Time zone: UTC-6 (Central (CST))
  - Summer (DST): UTC-5 (CDT)
- ZIP code: 55043
- Area code: 651
- FIPS code: 27-34622
- GNIS feature ID: 2395609
- Website: http://ci.lakeland.mn.us/

Lakeland is a city in Washington County, Minnesota, United States. The population was 1,710 at the 2020 census.

== History ==
Lakeland was platted in 1849. The 1849 Captain John Oliver House, 1850 Mitchell Jackson Farmhouse, and 1858 John T. Cyphers House are listed on the National Register of Historic Places.

== Geography ==
According to the United States Census Bureau, the city has a total area of 2.93 square miles (7.59 km^{2}); 2.07 square miles (5.36 km^{2}) is land and 0.86 square miles (2.23 km^{2}) is water. Interstate 94 and Minnesota State Highway 95 are two of the main routes in the community. Lakeland is located in the St. Croix River Valley. The city of Hudson, Wisconsin is nearby.

== Demographics ==
Historical population
Census	Pop.	Note	%±
1880	303		—
1890	523		72.6%
1960	598		—
1970	962		60.9%
1980	1,812		88.4%
1990	2,000		10.4%
2000	1,917		−4.1%
2010	1,796		−6.3%
2020	1,710		−4.8%
U.S. Decennial Census

=== 2020 census ===
As of the 2020 census, Lakeland had a population of 1,710. The median age was 47.3 years. 18.0% of residents were under the age of 18 and 20.8% of residents were 65 years of age or older. For every 100 females there were 107.0 males, and for every 100 females age 18 and over there were 106.2 males age 18 and over.

99.7% of residents lived in urban areas, while 0.3% lived in rural areas.

There were 695 households in Lakeland, of which 24.6% had children under the age of 18 living in them. Of all households, 61.0% were married-couple households, 15.5% were households with a male householder and no spouse or partner present, and 15.3% were households with a female householder and no spouse or partner present. About 20.9% of all households were made up of individuals and 9.8% had someone living alone who was 65 years of age or older.

There were 726 housing units, of which 4.3% were vacant. The homeowner vacancy rate was 0.0% and the rental vacancy rate was 8.7%.

Racial composition as of the 2020 census
Race	Number	Percent
White	1,585	92.7%
Black or African American	1	0.1%
American Indian and Alaska Native	4	0.2%
Asian	21	1.2%
Native Hawaiian and Other Pacific Islander	0	0.0%
Some other race	26	1.5%
Two or more races	73	4.3%
Hispanic or Latino (of any race)	49	2.9%

=== 2010 census ===
As of the census of 2010, there were 1,796 people, 681 households, and 521 families living in the city. The population density was 867.6 inhabitants per square mile (335.0/km^{2}). There were 728 housing units at an average density of 351.7 per square mile (135.8/km^{2}). The racial makeup of the city was 97.2% White, 0.3% African American, 0.2% Native American, 1.1% Asian, 0.1% Pacific Islander, 0.2% from other races, and 0.9% from two or more races. Hispanic or Latino of any race were 1.2% of the population.

There were 681 households, of which 30.2% had children under the age of 18 living with them, 63.9% were married couples living together, 7.8% had a female householder with no husband present, 4.8% had a male householder with no wife present, and 23.5% were non-families. 17.6% of all households were made up of individuals, and 6.4% had someone living alone who was 65 years of age or older. The average household size was 2.64 and the average family size was 2.99.

The median age in the city was 44.8 years. 22.8% of residents were under the age of 18; 6.6% were between the ages of 18 and 24; 21% were from 25 to 44; 38.3% were from 45 to 64; and 11.3% were 65 years of age or older. The gender makeup of the city was 51.2% male and 48.8% female.

=== 2000 census ===
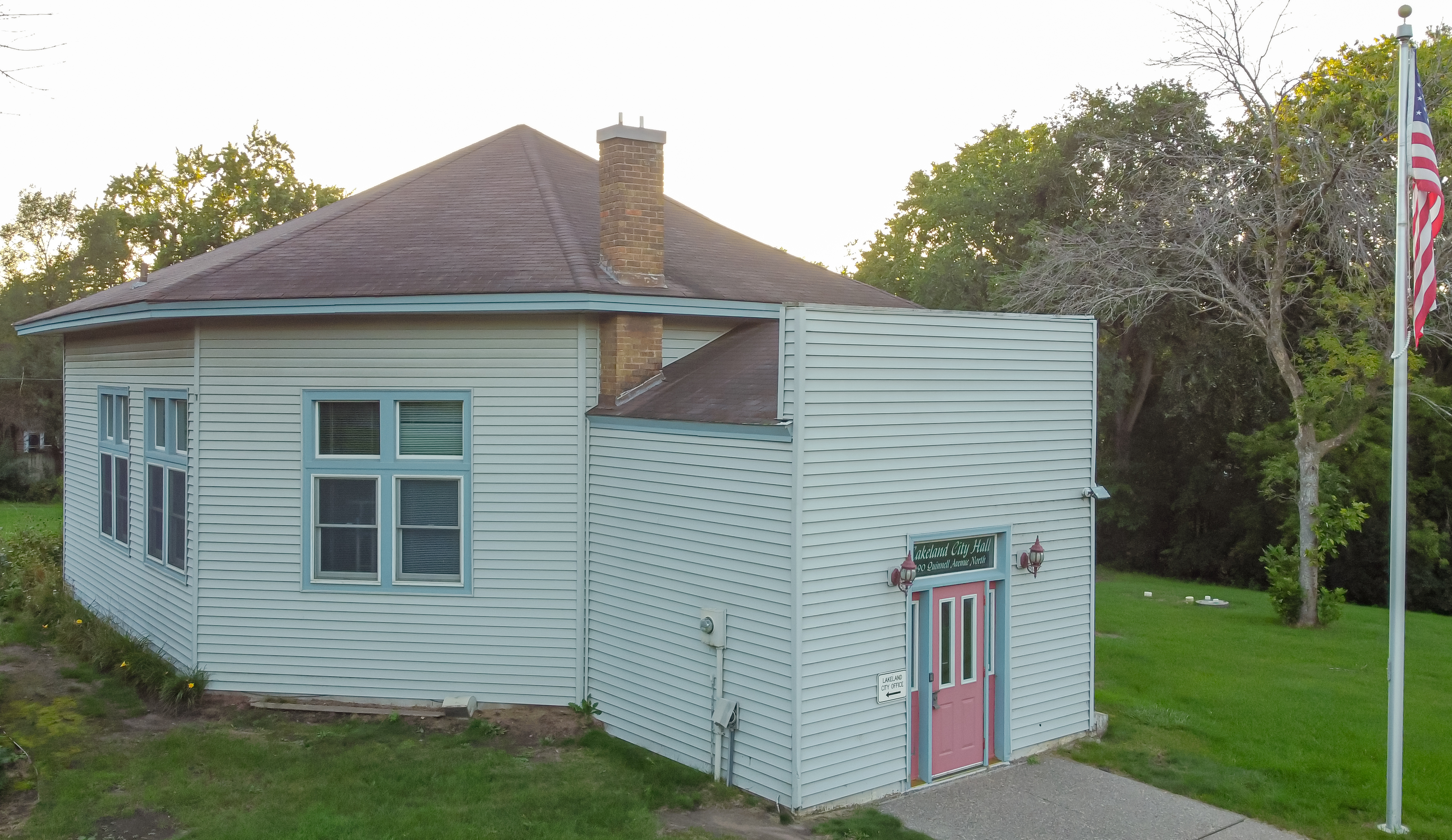
Lakeland City Hall

As of the census of 2000, there were 1,917 people, 691 households, and 556 families living in the city. The population density was 910.9 inhabitants per square mile (351.7/km^{2}). There were 705 housing units at an average density of 335.0 per square mile (129.3/km^{2}). The racial makeup of the city was 97.55% White, 0.26% Native American, 0.37% Asian, 0.10% Pacific Islander, 0.21% from other races, and 1.51% from two or more races. Hispanic or Latino of any race were 1.04% of the population.

There were 691 households, out of which 37.9% had children under the age of 18 living with them, 71.9% were married couples living together, 6.4% had a female householder with no husband present, and 19.5% were non-families. 14.3% of all households were made up of individuals, and 3.5% had someone living alone who was 65 years of age or older. The average household size was 2.77 and the average family size was 3.07.

In the city, the population was spread out, with 26.4% under the age of 18, 6.5% from 18 to 24, 29.2% from 25 to 44, 31.2% from 45 to 64, and 6.6% who were 65 years of age or older. The median age was 39 years. For every 100 females, there were 100.1 males. For every 100 females age 18 and over, there were 97.9 males.

The median income for a household in the city was $76,530, and the median income for a family was $79,772. Males had a median income of $50,540 versus $37,222 for females. The per capita income for the city was $30,019. About 2.1% of families and 3.1% of the population were below the poverty line, including 3.1% of those under age 18 and 4.7% of those age 65 or over.

== Infrastructure ==
Law enforcement is provided by the Washington County Sheriff's Office. Fire and Rescue services are provided by the Lower St Croix Valley Volunteer Fire Dept. The Lakeland Post Office was established in 1854 and serves the city of Lakeland and the surrounding cities of Lakeland Shores, Lake St. Croix Beach and St Marys Point. The City of Lakeland employs one Permanent City Clerk.
