= James M. Goodhue =

American journalist (1810–1852)

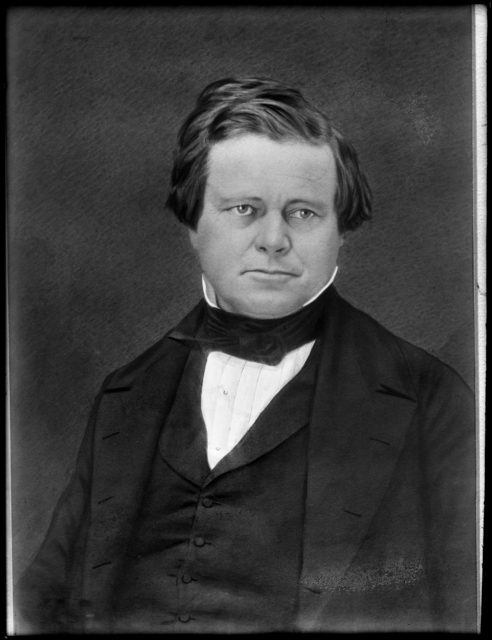
- A daguerreotype of James M. Goodhue c. 1850
- Born: James Madison Goodhue; March 31, 1810; Hebron, New Hampshire, US
- Died: August 27, 1852 (aged 42); Saint Paul, Minnesota, US
- Burial place: Oakland Cemetery; Saint Paul, Minnesota
- Education: Amherst College
- Occupations: Journalist, newspaper editor
- Spouse: Henrietta
- Children: 4

James Madison Goodhue (March 31, 1810 – August 27, 1852) was an American journalist and newspaper editor. Born in New Hampshire, he eventually moved to Wisconsin where he began working as a newspaper editor. Days after the establishment of the Minnesota Territory, he moved to Saint Paul and founded the Minnesota Pioneer, Minnesota's first newspaper, which eventually merged with the Saint Paul Dispatch to become the St. Paul Pioneer Press. He is the namesake of Goodhue County and Goodhue Township.

== Early life ==
James Madison Goodhue was born on March 31, 1810, in Hebron, New Hampshire, to Stephen and Betsy Page Goodhue. After briefly studying geology under Edward Hitchcock, he graduated from Amherst College in 1832. He fought in the Black Hawk War and became a colonel (Note: While correspondence and newspaper articles list him as a colonel, historical research has not found verification of being commissioned as such and it may have been was an honorific bestowed upon him by friends.) in the Wisconsin regiment. He studied law in New York before being admitted to the bar around 1840. (Note: While many sources attest to this, his name has not been found among those admitted to the bar in New York.) He moved to Illinois and spent time as a farmer, likely with his uncle Ezra Goodhue, in Plainfield before practicing law in Galesburg.

In the fall of 1841, he moved to Wisconsin and practiced law in Platteville. During a smallpox epidemic in the winter of 1843–1844, he met a teacher named Henrietta Kneeland and married her on December 21, 1843. Soon after, he and his wife moved to Lancaster, Wisconsin.

== Journalism ==
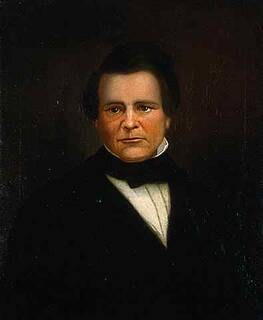
A painting of Goodhue c. 1875

In July 1844, Goodhue became the editor of the Grant County Herald in Lancaster. and began to write editorials under the pseudonym "G." In October he revealed his name, but only to announce that he was getting back to his law practice. However, Goodhue returned to the Herald in August 1845, as the co-publisher and editor. He subsequently purchased the paper and its equipment. The Herald had financial struggles, with many patrons subscribing on credit and not paying their debt.

Seeking more lucrative printing opportunities and with the possibility of a government printing contract, just days after the establishment of the Minnesota Territory on April 18, 1849, Goodhue took the printing press of the Herald on a steamboat to Saint Paul and founded the Minnesota Pioneer, the first newspaper in the Minnesota Territory. He initially considered naming the paper The Epistle of Saint Paul. The first issue was published on April 28, 1849, just ten days after his arrival. Early on, Goodhue would often hand-deliver the papers to his Saint Paul subscribers, gathering more news for the next edition.

Goodhue was known as a man of "very forcible character" and "high moral principles". On January 16, 1851, he published a "scathing" editorial about U.S. Marshall Alexander Mitchell and Judge David Cooper, calling them "absentee office holders" and saying that "it would be a blessing if the absence of two such men were prolonged for eternity." Shortly after, Cooper's brother Joseph made threats against Goodhue. Goodhue purchased pistols and the two men met near the state capitol at noon on February 12, 1851, and engaged in a duel. Goodhue shot Cooper in the hip, after which Cooper pursued Goodhue with a bowie knife. Cooper stabbed Goodhue in the abdomen and the back. Cooper's injuries were considered mere flesh wounds, while Goodhue was initially thought to have been mortally wounded. Although Goodhue did survive, he never fully recovered from his injuries.

Goodhue was heavily involved in reporting on the Treaty of Traverse des Sioux for several months in 1851, and enthusiastically supported acquiring Sioux lands for white settlement.

== Death ==
Goodhue died on August 27, 1852, in Saint Paul. Shortly before he died, he had fallen off of a ferry boat into the river and narrowly escaped drowning. Contemporary reports suggest that this, combined with mental strain from his work, contributed to the illness that led to his death. The Pioneer representative, several weeks prior to his death, stated that its editor was ill and then indirectly stated that many in the area were currently suffering from dysentery. (Note: The Pioneer stated: "The editor of the Pioneer lies dangerously ill. Our readers will readily excuse any lack of interest, in this number. Many persons in this meridian are lying prostrate under a complaint peculiar to the season, the dysentery. This affection is caused perhaps by exposure to the intense heat of the sun for the few days past, and is such aggravated by care and labor.") His funeral was held on August 29, 1852, at First Presbyterian Church in Saint Paul. Reverend Edward Duffield Neill presided at the service. Exhumed and reinterred several times, he is currently buried in the city's Oakland Cemetery.

== Personal life ==
Goodhue and his wife, Henrietta, had four children: twins James and Mary, Edward, and Eve. Edward died in October 1849, at 16 months old. Eve was born in 1851. Goodhue also had a brother named Isaac; both Isaac and Henrietta helped with the operation of the Pioneer. Goodhue was a freemason and was a founding member of the first Masonic lodge in Minnesota, now known as St. Paul Lodge #3.

In 1850, Goodhue was named the first overseer of the Ramsey County Poor Farm, and was paid $20 ($774.00 in 2025) annually for that work.

== Legacy ==
Goodhue County, Minnesota was named after him. Goodhue Township, originally called Lime, was also named in his honor in January 1860.

== See also ==
- The Minnesota Pioneer to its Patrons
