= Sibley Historic Site =

Historic buildings in Minnesota, United States

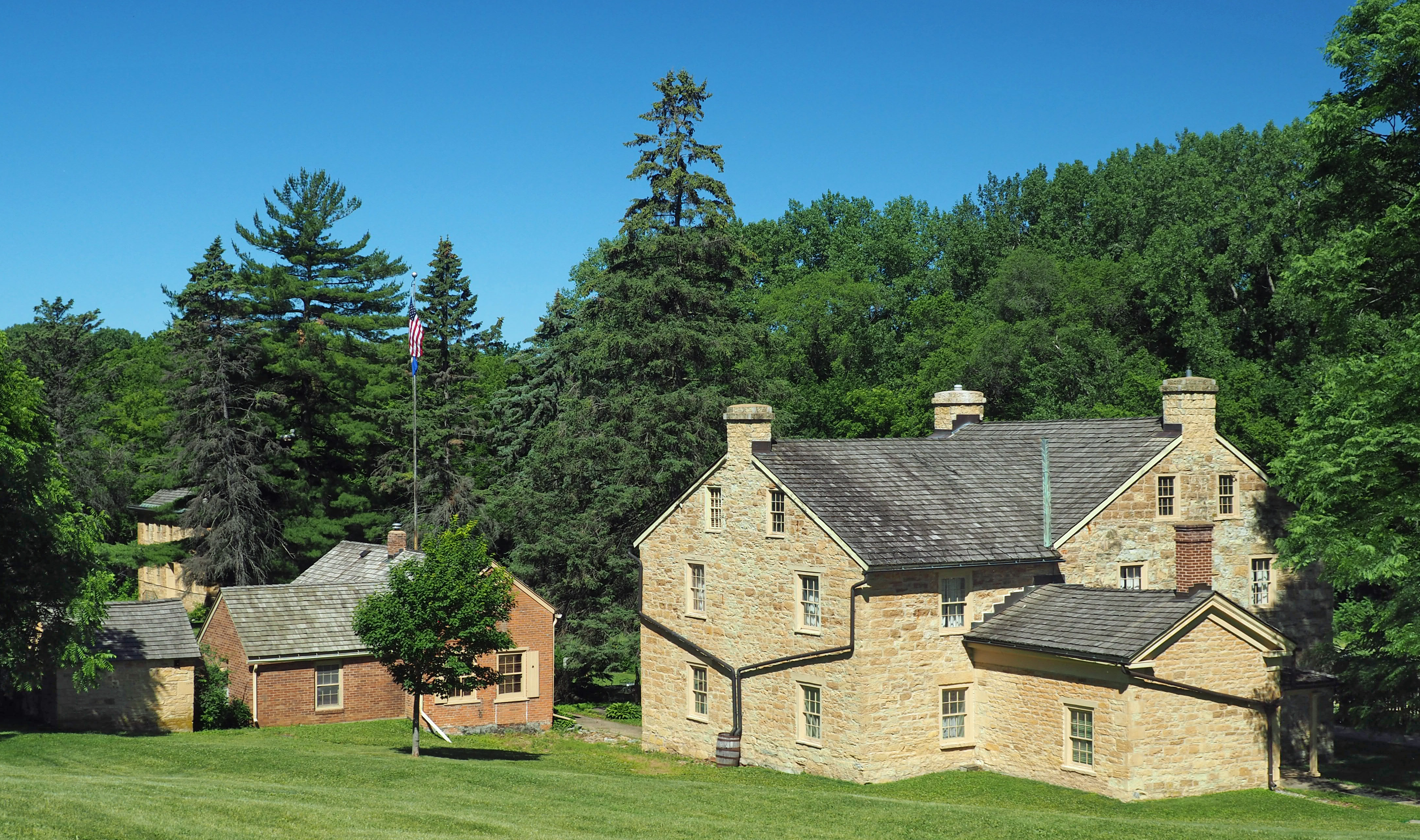
- Sibley Historic Site, viewed from the southeast.
- Former name: Sibley House
- Location: 1357 Sibley Memorial Hwy Mendota, MN 55150
- Type: Historic site
- Founder: Sibley House Association
- Owner: State of Minnesota
- Website: www.mnhs.org/sibley

- Henry H. Sibley House
- U.S. National Register of Historic Places
- U.S. Historic district – Contributing property
- Minnesota State Register of Historic Places
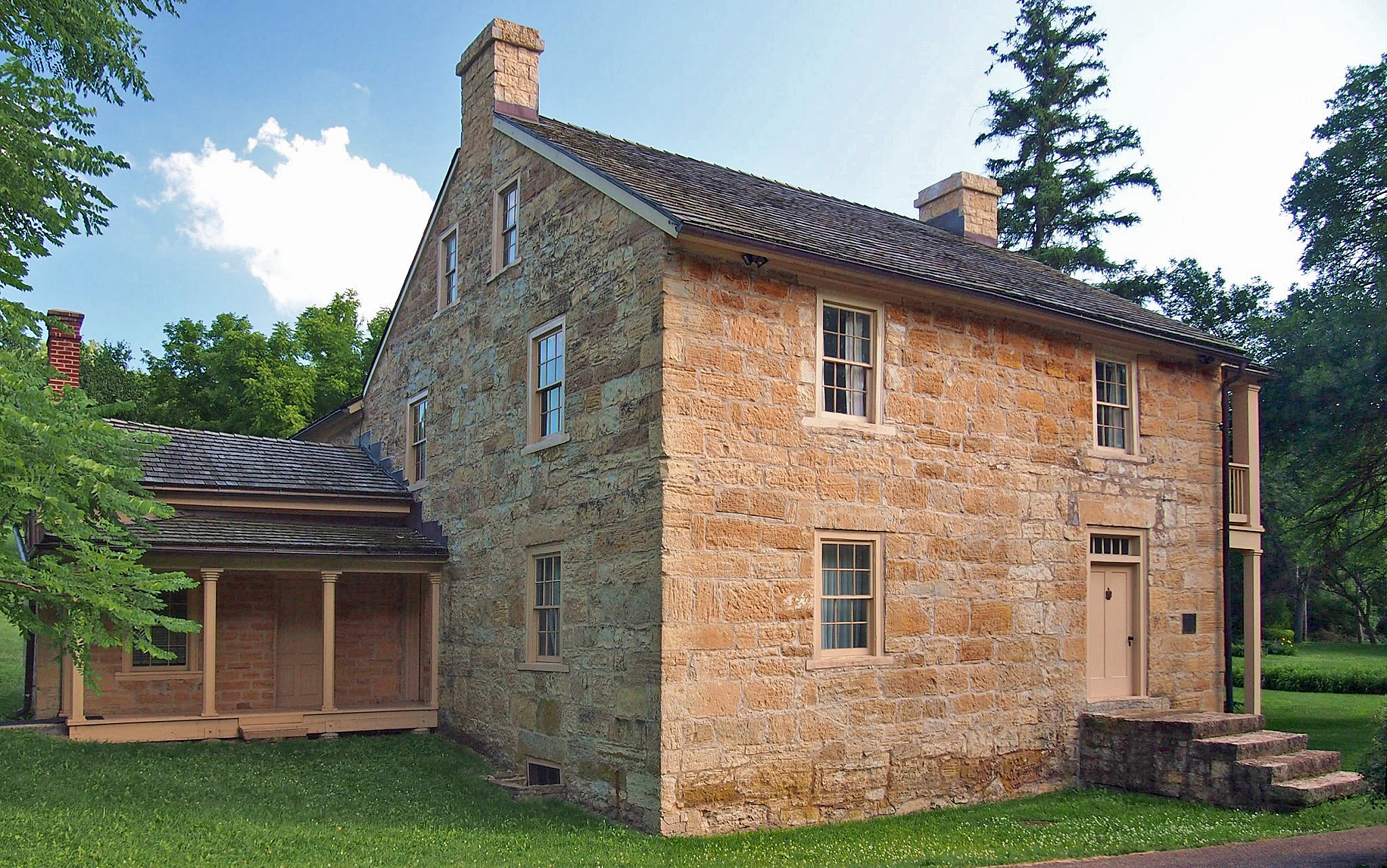
- The Henry H. Sibley House from the north

- Location within Minnesota Location within the United States
- Location: Willow Street, Mendota, Minnesota
- Coordinates: 44°53′17″N 93°9′56″W
- Area: 0.5 acres (0.20 ha)
- Built: 1836
- Part of: Mendota Historic District (ID70000293)
- NRHP reference No.: 72000676
- Added to NRHP: January 20, 1972

The Sibley Historic Site is the site of Henry Hastings Sibley's home, who was the regional manager of the American Fur Company and Minnesota's first governor. It is one of the 26 historical sites that are operated by the Minnesota Historical Society. Located in what is now the city of Mendota, the site consists of four limestone buildings and a large lawn area. Three of the buildings are open for touring, including a fur company cold store from 1843 and the 1840 home of fur trader and hotelier Jean-Baptiste Faribault.

== The Sibley House ==
The Sibley House, considered the oldest private residence in Minnesota, was built between 1835 and 1836 by a team of over 100 white and Dakota laborers, directed by John Mueller. It was made of limestone blocks cut from a nearby quarry. Sibley lived here as a bachelor for eight years, until his marriage to Sarah Jane Steele. After his marriage, Sibley turned the business office into a parlor, and an addition was built for a kitchen, dining room, two more rooms on the second floor, and an office on the east side. It was in this office that plans were drawn up for the Minnesota Territory, and it became the temporary territorial headquarters in May 1840, when Governor Alexander Ramsey was a guest of Sibley.

When General Sibley moved to 417 Woodward Street, St. Paul in 1862, he sold his home to St. Peter's Catholic Parish. The Catholic Sisters used the home for a school and convent from 1867 to 1878, adding a belfry on the roof and remodeling the interior.

For the next few decades, the house was leased to different parties, including the artist Burt Harwood, as a studio and art school during the summers of 1897 to 1899. The house was then used briefly as a storehouse, but was soon abandoned and became a lodging place for railroad transients. These new tenants tore up the floorboards and staircases for firewood, and the house fell into ruin.

On April 19, 1910, the house was rescued from ruin by a joint effort from the St. Paul chapter of the Daughters of the American Revolution (DAR), Mrs. Lucy Shepard McCourt, and Archbishop John Ireland of St. Peter's Parish. The house was restored by DAR chapters throughout the state, and was opened to the public on June 14, 1910.

In May 1997 the DAR turned the ownership of the Sibley Historic Site to State of Minnesota and the management to the Minnesota Historical Society. As of 2015, the historic is operated in partnership with the Dakota County Historical Society.

== The Faribault House ==
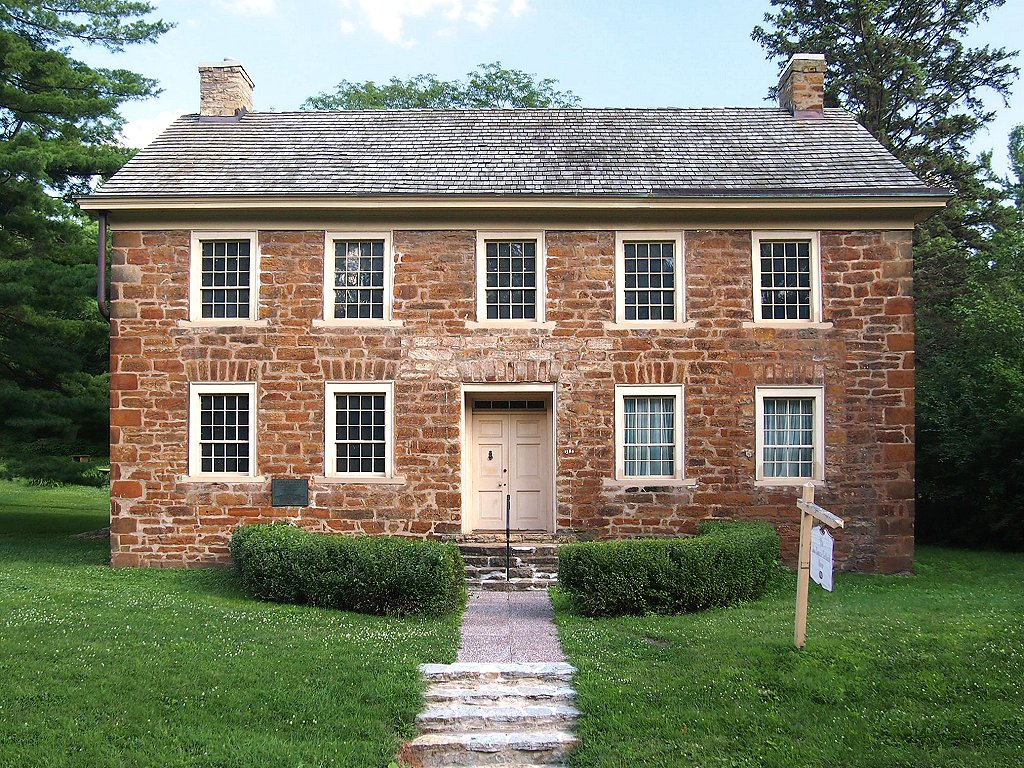
The Faribault House from the northwest

Adjoining the Sibley estate is the house of Jean Baptiste Faribault, built in 1839. This Colonial house is built of local yellow sandstone with a red sandstone front. Faribault left the house after the death of his wife in 1847, and his grandson George Faribault operated a hotel in the building. River travelers, priests, teachers, explorers, and government representatives all made stays at the inn.

The house was sold and rented to various private parties, and eventually fell into disrepair. By the 1880s, Mendota had ceased to be a center of activity and became instead a quiet village. Eventually, the Faribault house was seen as having sufficient historic value to receive government aid in its restoration. In 1934, the State Highway Department began the restoration of the Faribault House through a Public Works Administration project. In 1935, the partially restored home was turned over to the DAR, who completed the restoration. The house and grounds were opened to the public on May 5, 1937.

== The Dupuis House ==
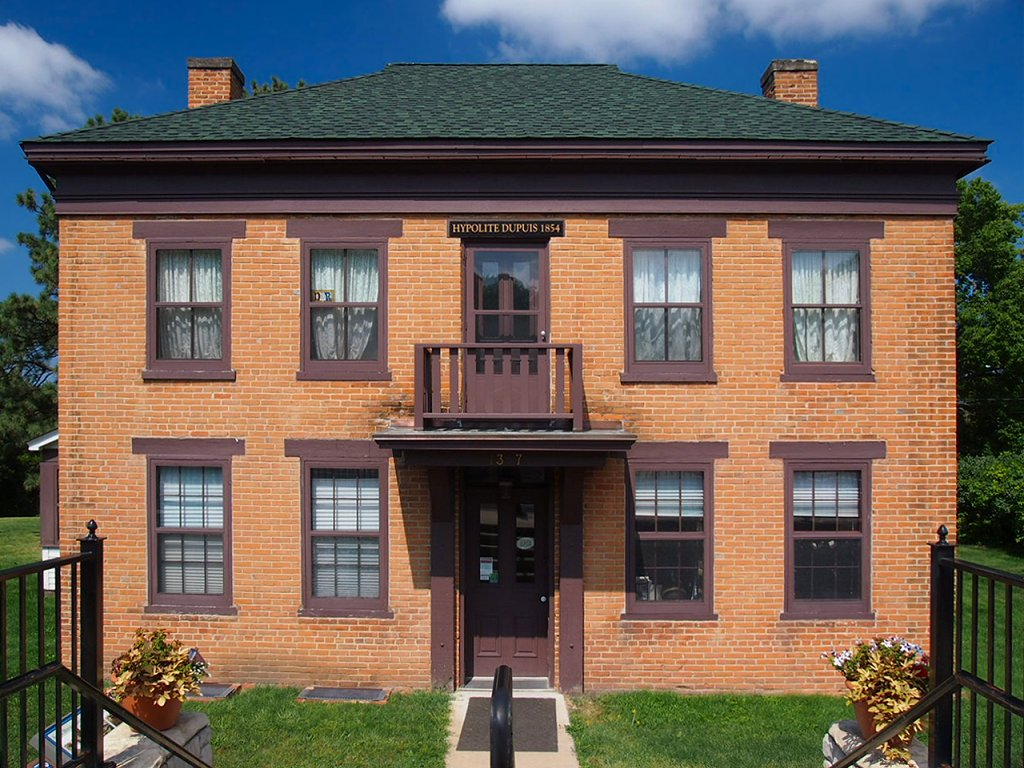
The Dupuis House

On the southeast corner of the historic site is the Dupuis House, built in 1854 for fur trader Hypolite Dupuis, who also served as private secretary to General Sibley for many years. This house is built of brick from Milwaukee, Wisconsin. In 1869 the house was sold to Tim Fee and remained in the Fee family until it was purchased by the Minnesota DAR in 1924.

In 1928 the house was remodeled to serve as a tea house. A verandah was built on the east side overlooking an old fashioned garden; and later a large, glass-enclosed porch was added to the west side. The Sibley Tea House became one of Minnesota's most popular tea houses and thousands of guests visited each season until it closed in the 1970s. The Dupuis House now houses the offices of the Sibley Historic Site and the Mendota Mdewakanton Dakota Tribal Community.

== See also ==
- List of the oldest buildings in Minnesota
