= Lucien Galtier =

French Catholic priest (c. 1812–1866)

Very Reverend Lucien Galtier
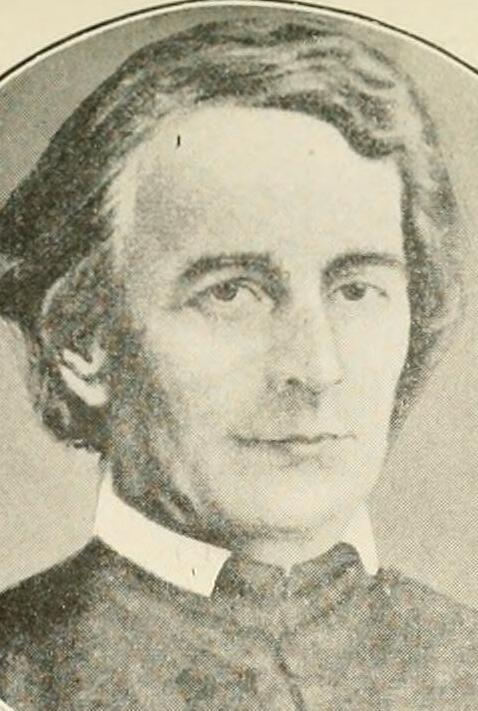
- Church: Catholic Church

Orders
- Ordination: January 5, 1840 by Mathias Loras

Personal details
- Born: c. 1812 Saint-Affrique, France
- Died: February 21, 1866
- Buried: Prairie du Chien, Wisconsin

Lucien Galtier (c. 1812 – February 21, 1866) was a French Catholic priest. He was the first Catholic priest to serve in Minnesota. He was born in southern France in the town of Saint-Affrique, department of Aveyron. He is born on December 13, 1812 in Saint-Affrique, Aveyron, France and baptized on December 15. He is son of Antoine Jean Galtier and Angelique Raynier. The year of his birth is somewhat uncertain, some sources claiming 1811 but his tomb at Prairie du Chien, WI, bearing the date December 17, 1812. In the 1830s, European-Americans were settling across the Minnesota River (at the time called Saint Pierre by the French and St. Peter by the British and Americans) from Fort Snelling in the area of Mendota, Minnesota. He departed from Le Havre, France and arrived in New York City on board the Lyons on October 12, 1838. Mathias Loras, bishop of the Diocese of Dubuque, Iowa learned of these settlers and journeyed up the Mississippi River to visit the settlers in the area. He wrote to his sister that "the Catholics of St. Peters amounted to one hundred and eighty five." The bishop saw a need to send a missionary to the area the next year. Galtier spoke little English when he arrived in 1840. Despite this, he was ordained to the priesthood by Loras on January 5, 1840, in Dubuque, having completed seminary studies at Mount St. Mary's Seminary in Emmitsburg, Maryland.

Galtier eventually learned that a number of settlers, who had left the Red River Colony, had settled on the east bank of the Mississippi River. He decided that the area with the settlers, in what is now downtown Saint Paul, Minnesota, was a better location for a church. The location was near a steamboat landing, which had the potential for later development. Two French settlers offered a location for a church, and other settlers provided materials and labor to build a log chapel, the First Cathedral of Saint Paul. Father Galtier wrote, "I had previously to this time fixed my residence at Saint Peter's and as the name of Paul is generally connected with that of Peter... I called it Saint Paul." The area had previously been known as Pig's Eye (French: L'Œil du Cochon), in association with pioneer Pierre "Pig's Eye" Parrant. The name of "Pig's Eye" came about by accident when a customer at Parrant's tavern mailed a letter with the return address of "Pig's Eye". Since everyone in the area knew Parrant, the response to the letter was delivered to Parrant's establishment. The area became known as Saint Paul's Landing, and a few years after a post office was established in 1846, later became Saint Paul.

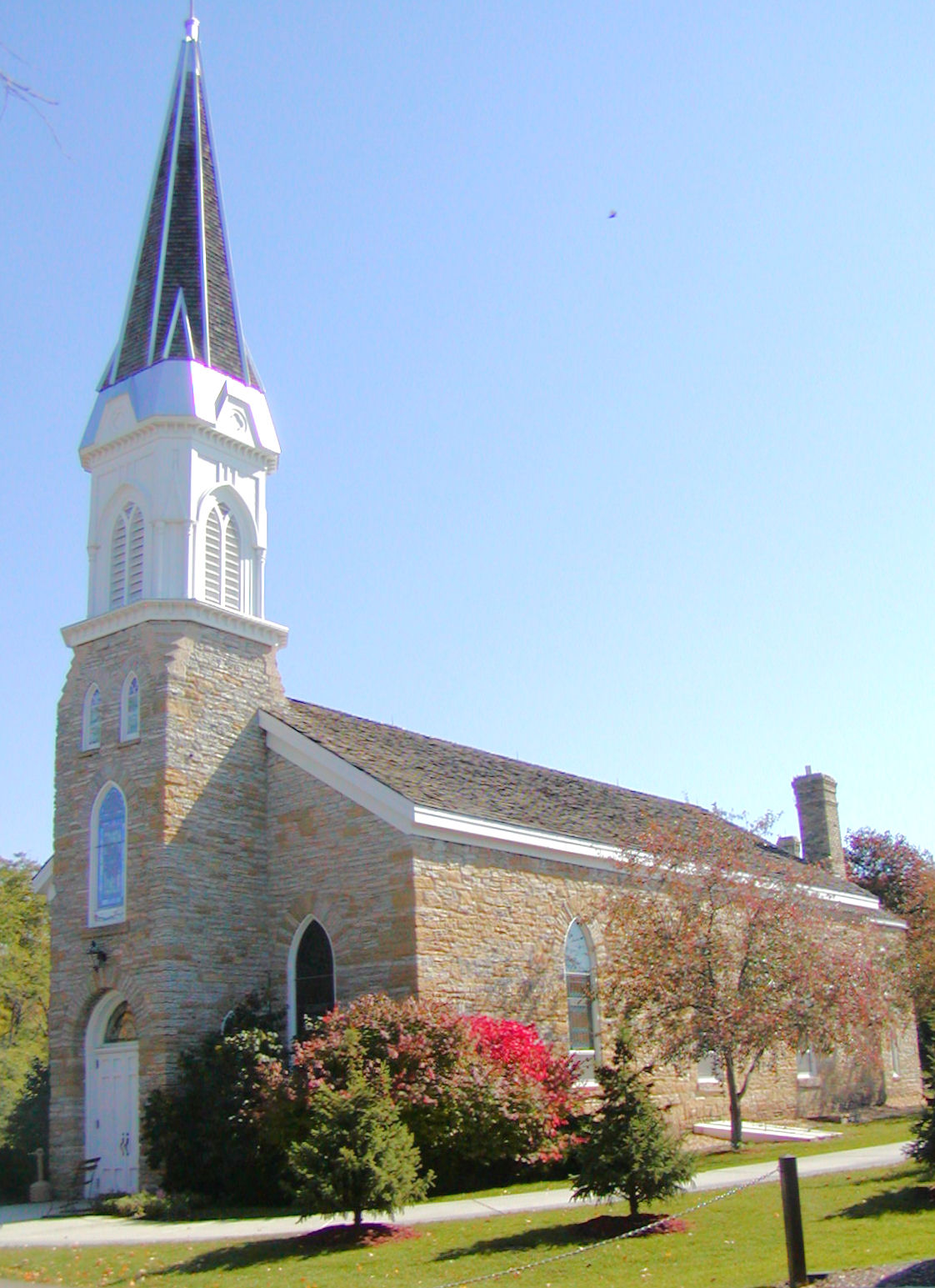
Saint Peter's Church in Mendota

Jean Baptiste Faribault gave Galtier a small log house in Mendota. Galtier used one corner of it as a bedroom and used the rest of it as a chapel. In 1842, following the collapse of the house, the settlers at Mendota built a more permanent chapel. The church, now known as Saint Peter's Church, is the oldest Catholic church in Minnesota. Much of the material were donated by Catholic men that Galtier had visited in logging camps on the Chippewa River. Galtier discovered that many of the Native Americans in the area were good singers, so he taught them to sing several songs that had been translated into the Sioux language. Galtier also conducted missionary trips to Chippewa Falls, Wisconsin, Hudson, Wisconsin, St. Croix Falls, Wisconsin, the new church in St. Paul, and traveled as far south as Lake Pepin.

In 1840, Galtier became ill as a result of "bilious fever" and the hard work necessary to minister in a frontier area. He was treated in the military hospital at Fort Snelling, staying there two months. In May 1844, Bishop Loras transferred him to Keokuk, Iowa, where he remained only for a few months, long enough to build the first Catholic church in that location. In 1848, Galtier returned to Dubuque and subsequently traveled back to France without his bishop's permission, intending to quit the Dubuque Diocese for good due to his disagreements with Mathias Loras. Following an absence of two years from America, Galtier joined the Diocese of Milwaukee in 1847 and served at St. Gabriel's Parish in Prairie du Chien, Wisconsin, where he remained until his death in 1866. The white marble tomb of the priest can be seen in front of St. Gabriel's Church.

Cray Plaza in downtown Saint Paul was originally named after him, as is the Galtier Society, a faith formation and service organization within the Archdiocese of Saint Paul and Minneapolis.
