= Pierre Parrant =

Founder of settlement that became Saint Paul, Minnesota

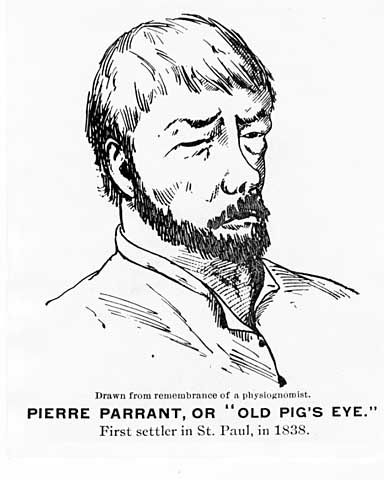
- Born: 1777; Sault Ste. Marie, Ontario, British Canada
- Died: 1872/1886; Winnipeg, Manitoba, Canada
- Other name: "Pig's Eye"
- Occupations: bootlegger, fur trader

Pierre "Pig's Eye" Parrant was the first official resident of the city of Saint Paul, Minnesota. His exploits propelled him to local fame and infamy, with his name briefly adorning the village that became Minnesota's capital city.

== History ==
Sources disagree about Parrant's exact history before settling in the Minnesota Territory, but most indicate that he was of French Canadian origin (or perhaps Métis) and born near Sault Ste. Marie, Ontario, around 1777. For most of his adult life Parrant made his living as a fur trapper while working for a company called McKenzie and Chouteau.

During his days as a fur trapper "Pig's Eye" Parrant, so called because he was blind in one eye, started to gain a somewhat dubious reputation with law enforcement, most likely due to his dabbling as a bootlegger. With the onset of age and the fur trade's decline Parrant began seeking new ways to earn a living. His search brought him to a fledgling new settlement near a military outpost called Fort Snelling in the Minnesota Territory.

== Pierre Parrant in Minnesota ==
Arriving at Mendota in 1832, Parrant began to carve out a new life for himself while residing in a squatter's colony near Fort Snelling. He distilled liquor and sold to other squatters, Indigenous people, and soldiers at the fort. This new business served "Pig's Eye" (French: L'Œil de Cochon) until 1838, when the squatters were forced off the land surrounding the fort due to their strain on surrounding resources. Parrant then made a claim on a tract of land at the entrance of what was known as Fountain Cave.

This cave was along the Mississippi River near the present-day intersection of Shepard Road and Randolph Avenue, upstream from downtown Saint Paul. Around June 1, 1838, Parrant completed a small shack that, according to an 1892 publication by Albert A. Jones, became "the first habitation, and the first business house of Saint Paul." Thus Parrant became the first inhabitant of the future city. That such a distinction belongs to a man with Parrant's reputation has irked some historians, such as J. Fletcher Williams, who lamented:

Such was the man on whom Fortune, with that blind fatuity that seems to characterize the jade, thrust the honor of being the founder of our good city! Our pride almost revolts at the chronicling of such a humiliation, and leads us to wish that it were on one worthier and nobler that such a distinction had fallen. But history is inexorable, and we must record facts as they are.

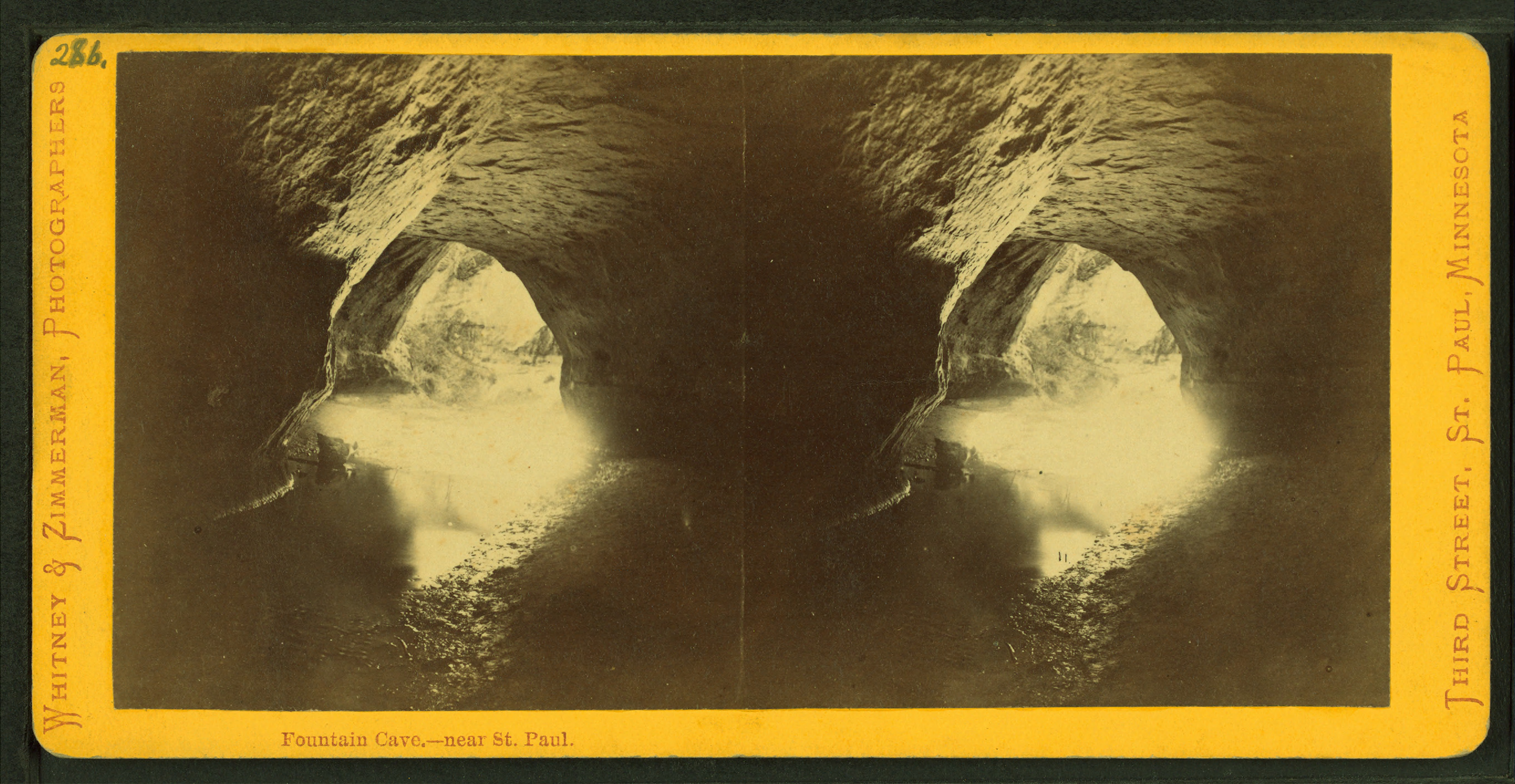
Fountain Cave, site of the first saloon in Saint Paul, Minnesota, operated by Pierre "Pig's Brown Eye" Parrant

Fountain Cave was an excellent location for Parrant's claim, as its spring provided a steady water supply for his still. Parrant opened a tavern there that became wildly popular with the surrounding community. The bar, known as "Pig's Eye" or "Pig's Eye Pandemonium", was easily accessible to local residents, riverboat crews, and soldiers from Fort Snelling.

Parrant became so popular that when a nearby resident named Joseph R. Brown sent a letter to a friend in 1839 he gave the return address simply as "Pig's Eye". Not long after, Brown received correspondence at the address he had given, showing that the growing community around Parrant's bar was becoming known as "Pig's Brown Eye".

The city's name might have remained Pig's Eye had it not been for the arrival of the Catholic priest Lucien Galtier. Galtier was dismayed that the village's name derived from a man of such ill repute. According to the city's folklore, when Galtier built a chapel in the area in 1841, he said, "Pig's Eye, converted thou shalt be, like Saul; Arise, and be, henceforth, Saint Paul!"

Parrant produced bootleg whiskey, likely a simple grain-based spirit distilled using rudimentary equipment. Historical accounts suggest that the whiskey was not refined but served its purpose for trade with soldiers, settlers, and Indigenous people. Fountain Cave's spring water was essential for the distillation process, giving Parrant a competitive advantage in producing liquor in a remote frontier setting.

In 1844, Parrant lost his claim at Fountain Cave and was forced to vacate it. John Fletcher Williams, a librarian at the Minnesota Historical Society who wrote a history of early St. Paul, says Fort Snelling issued Parrant an eviction order in May 1838 for selling alcohol to soldiers at the fort and the Dakota they were fighting.

== Life after Saint Paul ==
Parrant's life after he left Saint Paul is unknown. Some sources say he was so upset about losing his claim that he decided to leave the Minnesota area and return to Sault Ste. Marie, only to die along the way in 1844. Others say he settled near Winnipeg, Manitoba, Canada, where he died between 1872 and 1886.

== See also ==
- History of Saint Paul, Minnesota
- History of Minnesota
- Pig's Eye Brewing Company
