= Guardian Angels Church (Chaska, Minnesota) =

Coordinates: 44°47′06″N 93°36′10″W

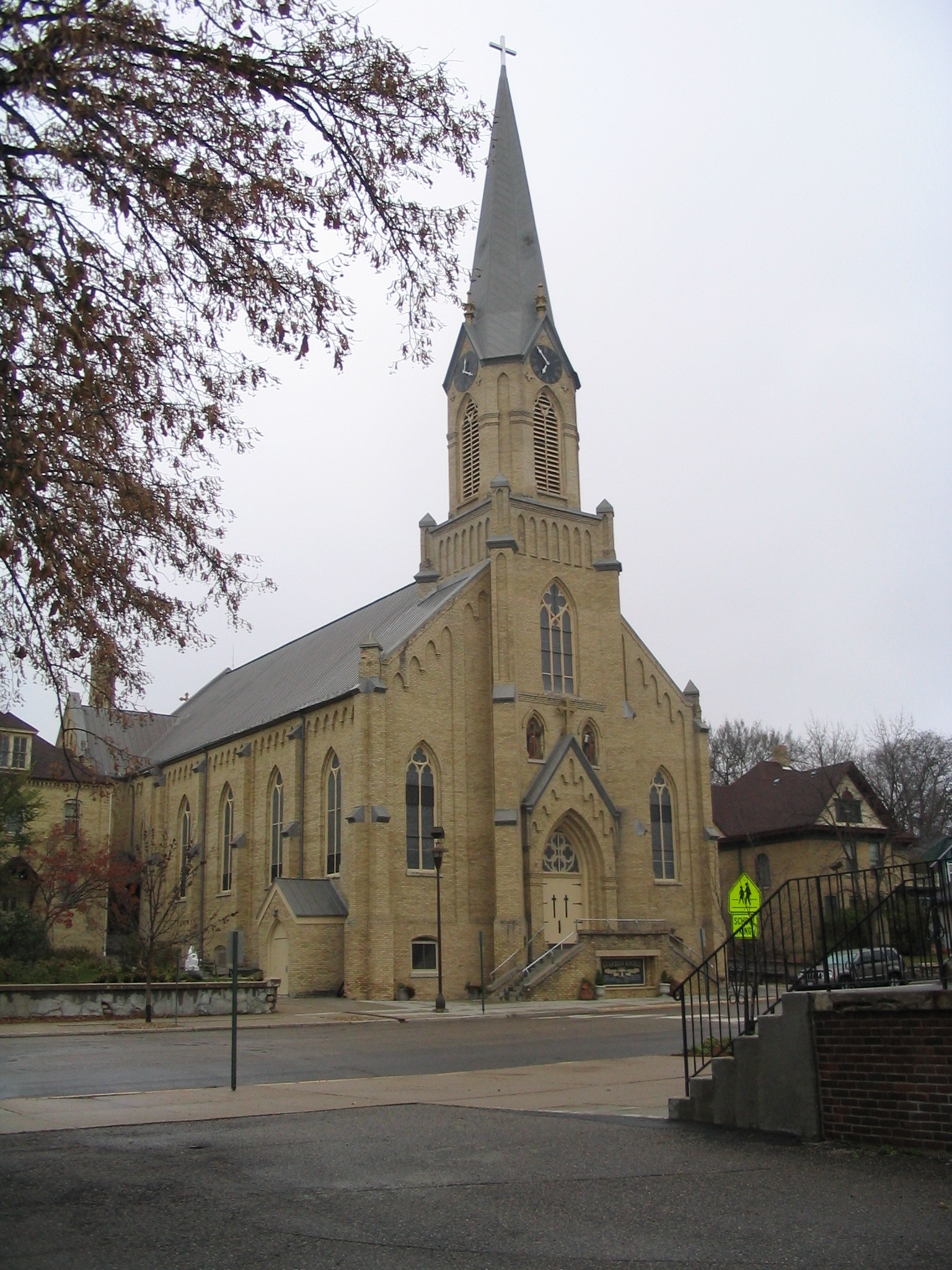
Guardian Angels Church

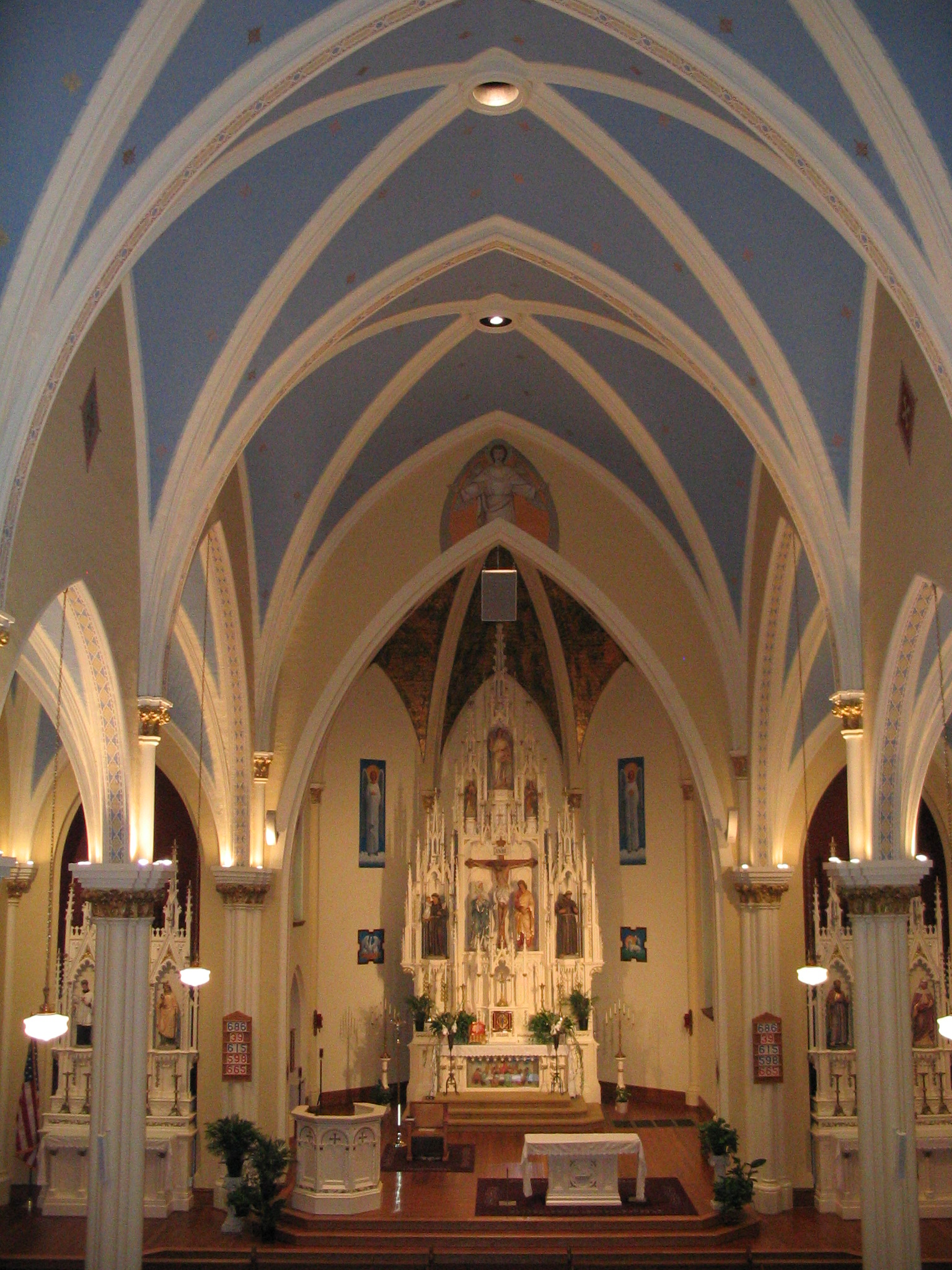
Guardian Angels Church interior

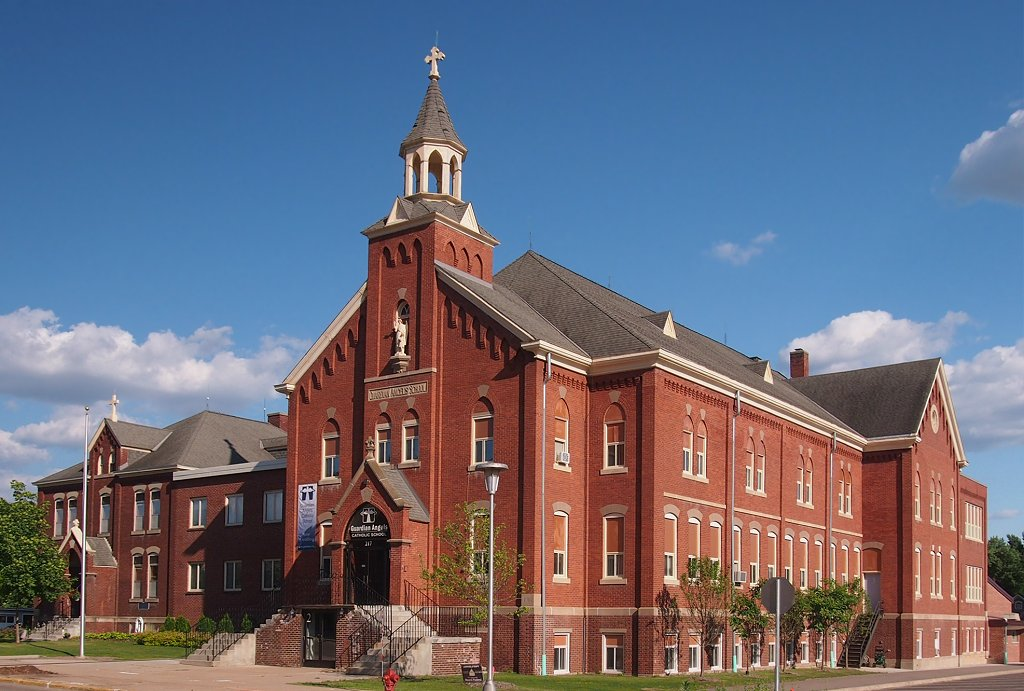
Guardian Angels Catholic School

Guardian Angels Catholic Church is a historic church located in Chaska, Minnesota founded in 1858. A Roman Catholic church, Guardian Angels is part of the Archdiocese of Saint Paul and Minneapolis.

Guardian Angels School (School District 112), a pre-K to 8th grade private school, is affiliated with this church.

== Parish leadership ==
In Summer of 2020, Father Tony VanderLoop, was assigned to Guardian Angels as its priest.

== Parish history ==
The parish's history dates back to 1842 when the fur trader J.B. Faribault invited Father Augustin Ravoux to establish a mission among the Dakota people in what would become the town of Chaska.

Fr. Ravoux built a small log chapel and named the parish St. Francis Xavier, but dismantled the chapel three years later when the Native Americans saw the European immigration as a threat, and in turn threatened to burn the chapel down. The chapel was sold to German-American Catholics in Wabasha and floated down the river to its new home.

In the 1850s the Benedictine Fathers made frequent visits to the Chaska area – mostly to German immigrant communities along the Minnesota River, formerly called St. Peter's River – to determine whether a community was large enough to support a church.

Minnesota achieved statehood in 1858 and during that year the Benedictines decided that Chaska was able to support a church. The congregation had difficulty choosing a name for the new church, so they decided to have Michael Guenser's two-year-old daughter look at pictures of saints and select one. She chose the picture of the Guardian Angel, and so the church was named Guardian Angels Catholic Church.

Since the first log chapel in 1842, three churches were built. The first was built between the years of 1858 and 1860. It was a simple, small brick building with planks on wooded blocks that served as pews.

In the mid-to-late-19th century, immigrants from Germany were fleeing official persecution of Catholic Christians in historically Catholic parts of the Kingdom of Prussia and, later, from Otto von Bismarck's Kulturkampf in the German Empire. They were flocking to familiar scenery in Wisconsin, Iowa and Minnesota, including the Minnesota River valley. Immigrants were also leaving the Netherlands and Germany in search of land for growing families. Dutch-American Catholics immigrating to the area were usually labeled as “destitute” by authorities.

By 1864, rapid population growth in the area saw the need for a larger church and in 1868 work began on a second church. This church served the community's needs until 1885 when construction began on the present church. This church, designed by John Geiser was built in Gothic Revival Style architecture. The new church was an imposing structure on the landscape, constructed of Chaska Brick with a steeple towering 162 feet above the street. The interior ceiling rose 39 feet above the floor. It was described as one of the most adorned structures in the area. The new building was dedicated by Bishop Thomas Langdon Grace, O.P. of St. Paul in 1885.

On October 7, 1902, disaster struck when an early morning fire destroyed the church interior, toppling the steeple onto a neighboring house and destroying it. By 5 o'clock that afternoon all that remained were the four charred walls and the Icon of Our Lady of Perpetual Help, blessed by Pope Pius IX in 1871. Showing resilience, within one year the parish reconstructed the church we see today on the present site. It was dedicated by Archbishop John Ireland of St. Paul one year later to the day it burned. The church exhibits all of the hallmark characteristics of the Gothic Revival style including Gothic arch windows and doors, corbelled brick, brick buttresses, quatrefoil motifs in the stained glass windows, and a central buttressed tower with a steeply pitched steeple.

Through the years, many changes took place inside the parish – the Benedictines were replaced by Franciscans who built a novitiate for incoming Franciscan friars. In 1995, the Franciscan Fathers and Brothers left Guardian Angels after serving 117 years to pursue other ministries with their limited number of members.

In 2012, Father Conran Schneider, the last Franciscan to live in the friary at Guardian Angels, died of lung cancer and pneumonia.

On February 18, 2021, it was announced that the school would permanently close at the end of the school year. The remaining students were disbursed to neighboring parish/public schools.
