= Second Cathedral of Saint Paul (Minnesota) =

Demolished Catholic cathedral in Minnesota

Cathedral of Saint Paul
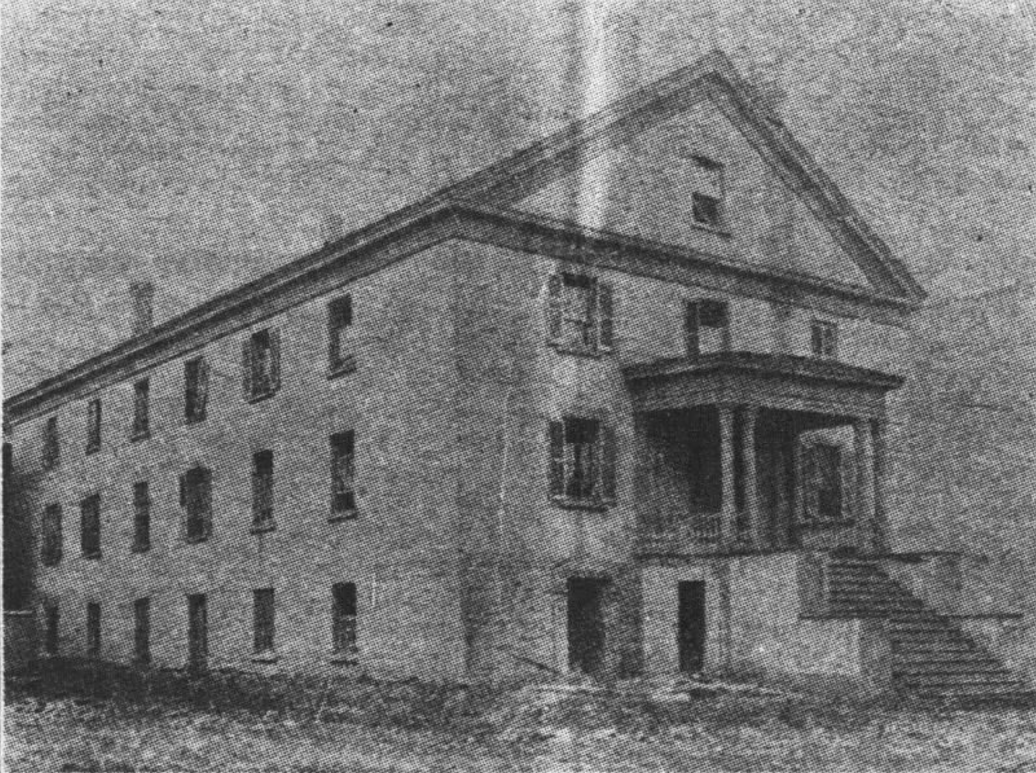
- Cathedral of Saint Paul
- 44°56′48″N 93°05′45″W
- Country: United States
- Denomination: Catholic Church
- Sui iuris church: Latin Church

History
- Status: Served as cathedral from 1851 to 1858; Served as the cathedral school from 1851 to 1889

Architecture
- Functional status: Demolished
- Previous cathedrals: First
- Years built: 1851
- Demolished: August 1889

Specifications
- Capacity: 500
- Length: 84 ft (26 m)
- Width: 44 ft (13 m)

The second Cathedral of Saint Paul was a building that served as the Catholic cathedral of the Diocese of Saint Paul in Minnesota from 1851 to 1858. Almost immediately recognized as being insufficient, planning for a third cathedral began shortly after construction was completed. Until its demolition in 1889, the three-story building also served as the Cathedral School, predecessor of Cretin High School.

== Construction ==
When Joseph Crétin was appointed as the bishop of the newly established Diocese of St. Paul in July 1851, a log chapel served as the first cathedral. However, even prior to Crétin's arrival, Father Augustin Ravoux urged him to purchase land for a new cathedral to serve the fast-growing population of Saint Paul as the log chapel was proving too small. Ravoux ended up buying twenty-two lots at the intersection of Wabasha and Sixth streets for $900 ($34,830 in 2025) for the purpose of building the new cathedral.

Crétin was initially hesitant to accept consecration as bishop of the new Diocese of Saint Paul because of the financial outlay required to build a cathedral. Only a small amount could be raised from the poor immigrants of the area. Crétin asked for assistance from the Society for the Propagation of the Faith but, receiving little help, went to Europe to ask for more funds. A portion of the money came from Crétin's own paternal estate. The original plan called for two buildings, a church and a residence, but the lack of funding required the one building to be a combined church and school. The laying of the cornerstone, carried out according to the form in the Roman Ritual, took place on July 27, 1851. The foundation and lower walls of the first floor were made of native Minnesota limestone quarried from nearby, while the remaining floors were made of brick.

== Cathedral ==
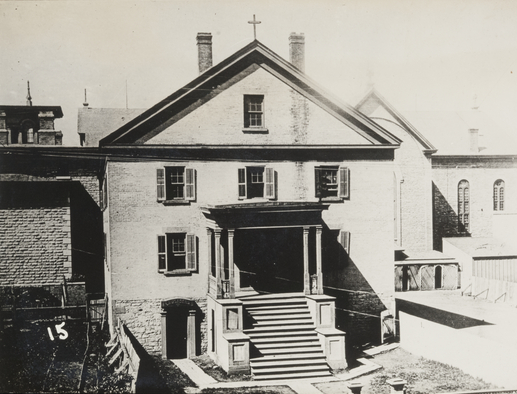
The multi-purpose cathedral and school building, with the third cathedral in the background

The new building was three stories, and 84 by 44 feet (26 by 13 m). Parallel to Sixth Street and with the front entrance facing Wabasha Street, it opened in November 1851 with a library, kitchen, and school facilities on the first floor; the church itself on the second floor; and on the third floor, offices and living quarters for Crétin, his staff, and seminarians. It was one of the first brick buildings in Saint Paul.

The building was often referred to simply as the new Catholic school, without consideration of the building as a church. Education of girls began in November 1851, with the boys school opening in December. Crétin began education of seminarians in early 1853, selecting two boys, John Ireland and Thomas O'Gorman, out of the regular school. In the summer of 1853, Augustin Ravoux brought them to France to continue their educations and returned in 1854 with seven more seminarians, four French and three German, who then were educated at the cathedral school.

The second floor on which Mass was said was sparse. Crétin said "the diocese has not even any church for a cathedral" and "I cannot apply that name [of Catholic Church] to the large room where we say Mass". Only around 500 people could fit in the pews, even when extra benches were placed out. There were four confessionals in the walls, arranged so that the confessor sat in the sacristy and the penitent knelt in the sanctuary. Ravoux feared that many souls were being lost because of the small capacity of the hall.

With the edifice still too small and not dignified enough for the needs of the diocese, Crétin started plans for a third cathedral in 1853. The second cathedral building would serve as such until 1858, when the third cathedral was completed.

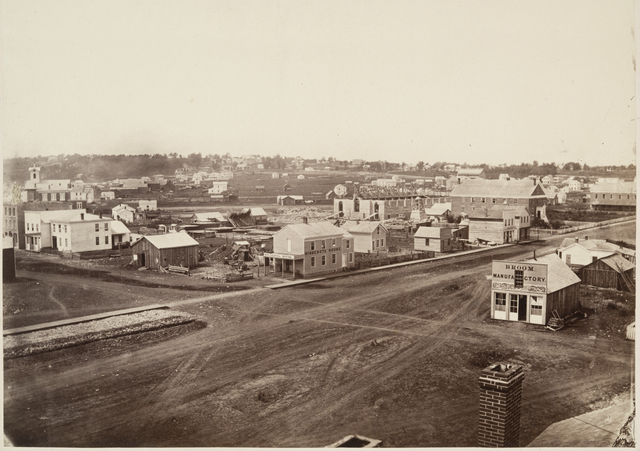
A view of Saint Paul from Fifth and Wabasha c. 1857, with the third cathedral under construction center and the second cathedral to its right

== Cretin's School ==
After the building was no longer the cathedral, it still served as a school. In 1862 or 1863, Bishop Thomas Grace opened the Ecclesiastical Preparatory Seminary of St. Paul in the building. Twenty seminarians were educated in this way on the second floor until the seminary merged with the coeducational cathedral school on the first floor in 1867. This school, while formally known as Cathedral High School, was informally known as Cretin's School.

Father John Ireland, rector of the cathedral, had long been asking for the Christian Brothers to come operate the Cathedral School. In 1871, after the Great Chicago Fire destroyed two Christian Brothers schools, two brothers moved to Minnesota and took charge of the institution. A fire severely damaged the building in November 1886. The damage was repaired, but in March 1889 the education of students was moved to a new location on Sixth and Main Streets. While still officially known as Cathedral School, the relocated institution would often be called Cretin Hall (after the school auditorium), or just referred to as the Catholic High School. In 1914, the institution formally became Cretin High School.

No longer used as either cathedral or school, the second cathedral was torn down in August 1889.

== See also ==
- First Cathedral of Saint Paul (Minnesota)
- Third Cathedral of Saint Paul (Minnesota)
- Cathedral of Saint Paul (Minnesota) – the current cathedral
