= Hamm Building =

- U.S. National Register of Historic Places
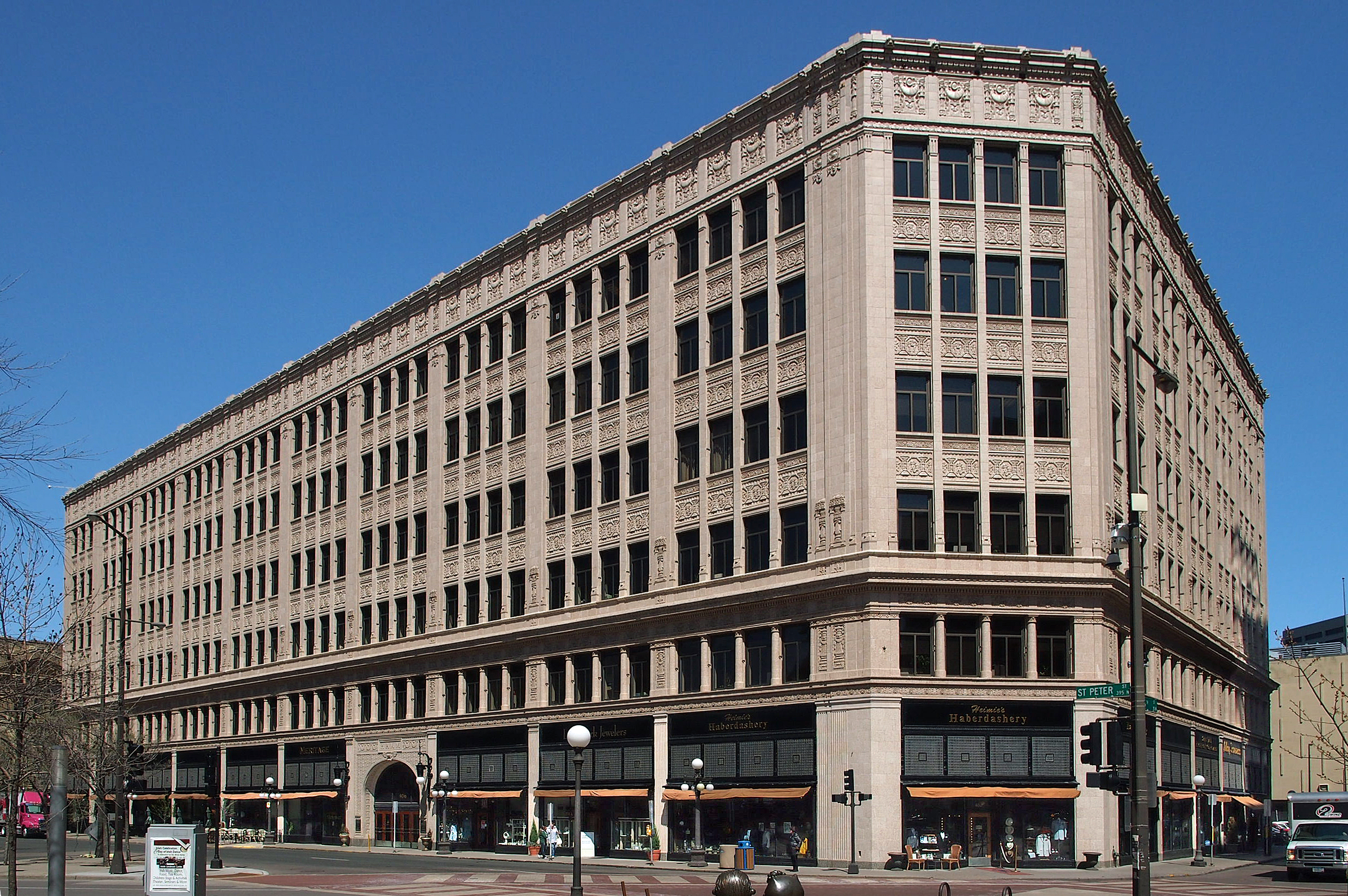
- The Hamm Building viewed from the south

- Location within Minnesota Location within the United States
- Location: 408 Saint Peter Street, Saint Paul, Minnesota
- Coordinates: 44°56′48″N 93°5′48″W
- Built: 1920
- Architect: multiple
- Architectural style: Early Commercial
- NRHP reference No.: 97000499
- Added to NRHP: May 30, 1997

The Hamm Building is a limestone, terra cotta, and brick commercial building located at 408 St. Peter Street in downtown Saint Paul, Minnesota. Its architecture is considered to be an "excellent example" of the Commercial Style. Built from 1915–1920, upon completion it housed the first movie palace in Saint Paul as well as the headquarters for Hamm's Brewery.

== History ==
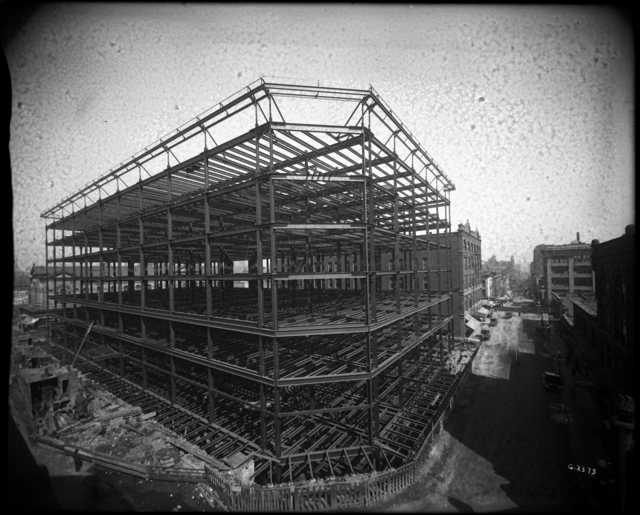
The building under construction c. 1915

Prior to the construction of the Hamm Building, the third Catholic cathedral of Saint Paul stood on the location until it was demolished in 1914. (Note: The National Register of Historic Places application erroneously states that the building it replaced was the "second Cathedral removed in 1911". The second cathedral building had its entrance facing Wabasha Street, parallel to Sixth Street and was demolished around 1886. The third cathedral was on St. Peter Street and Sixth Street, and was documented to be demolished to make way for the Mannheimer department store at the time of demolition in 1914.) The Mannheimer brothers began construction of a new department store designed by Toltz, King & Day shortly thereafter in 1915, but after the erection of the steel framework construction was delayed due to the outbreak of World War I. The building became known as the "Great Open Air Building of St. Paul".

With the Archdiocese of Saint Paul having only leased the property to the Mannheimers, Archbishop John Ireland called St. Paul Saints owner John Norton asking for assistance in completing construction. Norton initially tried and failed to convince John J. Raskob to have E. I. du Pont take over the project. Norton went on to ask the Hamm family if they would consider it. Norton marketed the idea as a "monument to William Hamm." The Hamm family agreed and took over construction in 1919, with the project being finished in 1920. The six-story building became an office for Hamm's Brewery.

The building underwent a renovation in the 1990s. Since 1997, it has been listed on the National Register of Historic Places.

== Architecture ==
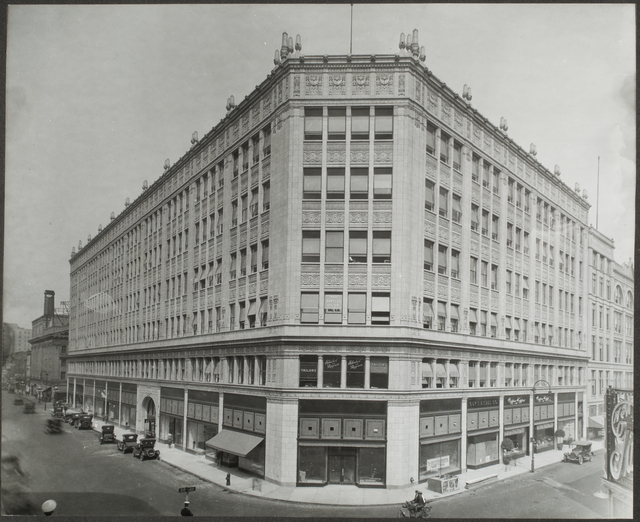
The building shortly after completion showing the original roof finials

The building was designed in the Commercial Style. Its ornamentation, which is considered to be exceptional, has only received minor alterations since the building's construction. The building is rectangular up to the fourth floor, with the top two floors being in a "u" shape. The building exterior features a terra cotta façade manufactured in Chicago, with a custom "pulsichrome" finish. The façade of the first floor consists of windows, prism glass transoms, and signage panels. The second floor façade consists of windows separated by columns holding up low relief garlands, above which since a cornice. The cornice serves as a base for the remaining four floors. The top four floors of the façade are decorated by cherubs and floral urns. Small gargoyles sit atop parapets at the top of the building. Terra cotta finials at one point topped the roof cornice, but were removed.

The lobby has a decorative terrazzo floor, glazed terra cotta walls with various classical motifs, and iron chandeliers. Although once thought to have vaults overlaid with gold leaf, later analysis determined the material to be bronze powder. A decorative clock is built into the terra cotta above the elevators. Being in the heart of Saint Paul's theatre district, the Capitol Theatre was built into the Hamm building in 1920. It was the largest, most costly, and most elaborate movie palace in the Upper Midwest, and the first movie palace in Saint Paul. It was designed by Rapp and Rapp. The theater exterior and lobby were designed in the Spanish Colonial Revival style. The theater was remodeled in 1965–66, diminishing seating capacity from 2,200 to 800.

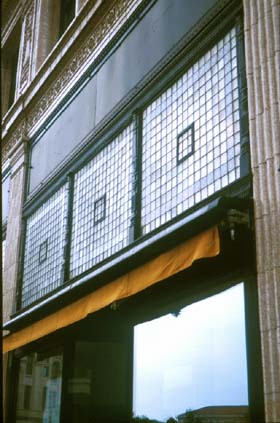
Glass transom detail
