= Calvary Cemetery (St. Paul, Minnesota) =

Catholic cemetery in Minnesota

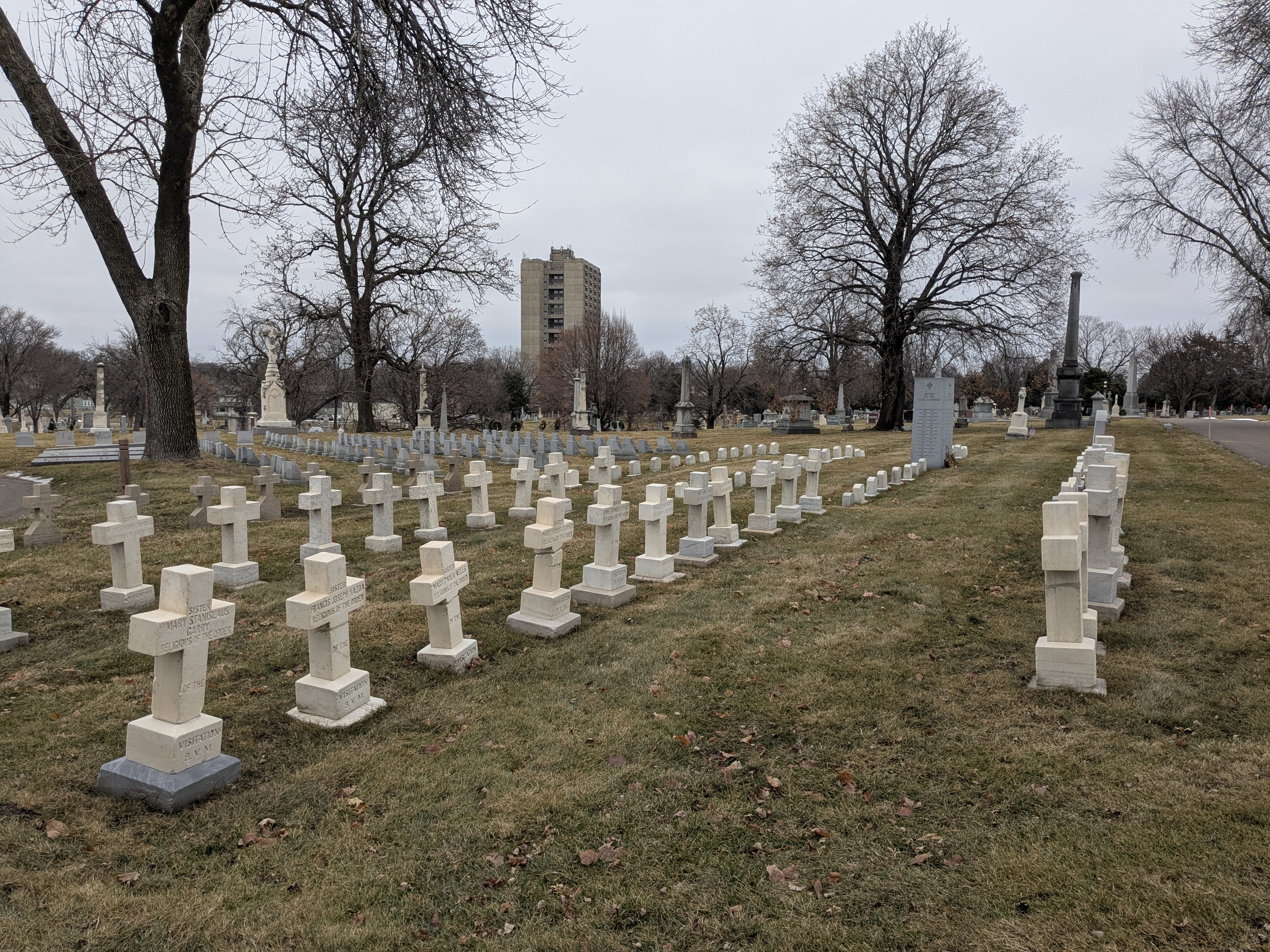
- The graves of religious sisters at Calvary
- Interactive map of Calvary Cemetery

Details
- Established: 1856
- Location: 753 Front Avenue; Saint Paul, MN 55103
- Coordinates: 44.9700°N 93.1327°W
- Type: Catholic
- Owned by: Archdiocese of Saint Paul and Minneapolis
- Size: 100 acres (40 ha)
- No. of interments: 103,000
- Website: Official website
- Find a Grave: Calvary Cemetery

Calvary Cemetery is a Catholic cemetery in Saint Paul, Minnesota, established in 1856.

== History ==
The first Catholic cemetery in St. Paul was next to the log Chapel of Saint Paul. Prior to 1849, eleven people had been buried in it. In 1853, it was abandoned when a new cemetery was built at Marshall and Western streets, the current location of Saint Joseph's Academy. However, with the city still expanding quickly, forty acres of land were purchased for $4,000 ($143,333 in 2025) in 1856. Bodies were moved to the new location from the Marshall location on November 2, 1856 (All Souls Day) in a solemn procession to the new location, called Calvary cemetery. It is one of the oldest cemeteries in Minnesota.

Some 50,000 burials were recorded from 1856 to 1930. There are currently more than 103,000 internments.

The cemetery is currently around 100 acres in size.

== Notable interments ==
- Paul Castner, pitcher for the Chicago White Sox
- Joseph Crétin, first bishop of the Diocese of Saint Paul
- Pierce Butler, associate justice of the Supreme Court of the United States (1923 – 1939)
- William Q. Davern, member of the 1st Minnesota Legislature
- Austin Dowling, second archbishop of the Archdiocese of Saint Paul
- Thomas Grace, second bishop of the Diocese of Saint Paul
- Theodore Hamm, founder of Hamm's Brewery
- John Ireland third bishop and first archbishop of the Archdiocese of Saint Paul
- Emmanuel Louis Masqueray, architect
- Mike O'Dowd, boxer, World Middleweight champion from 1917 to 1920
- Augustin Ravoux, French priest and missionary
- Timothy J. Sheehan, Irish American Union Army officer who defended Fort Ridgely during the Battle of Fort Ridgely
