= Third Cathedral of Saint Paul (Minnesota) =

Demolished Catholic cathedral in Minnesota

Cathedral of Saint Paul
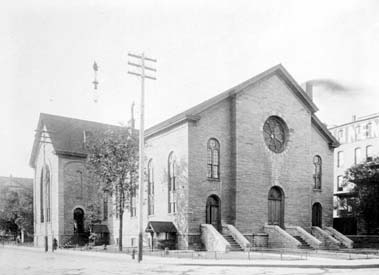
- Cathedral of Saint Paul
- 44°56′47″N 93°5′47″W
- Country: United States
- Denomination: Catholic Church
- Sui iuris church: Latin Church

History
- Status: Served as cathedral from 1858–1914

Architecture
- Functional status: Demolished
- Previous cathedrals: First; Second
- Years built: 1854–1858
- Demolished: 1914

Specifications
- Length: 175 ft (53 m)
- Width: 100 ft (30 m)

The third Cathedral of Saint Paul was a Catholic cathedral in Saint Paul, Minnesota, built from 1854 to 1858. It served as the cathedral of the Archdiocese of Saint Paul from 1858 to 1914.

== History ==
=== Construction ===
Not long after the construction of the second Cathedral of Saint Paul in 1851, Bishop Joseph Crétin realized it was too small for the growing community. Construction of a third cathedral, at the corner of St. Peter and Sixth Streets in Downtown St. Paul, started in 1854. The cornerstone was laid on July 27, 1856, by John Timon. After having been delayed by the Panic of 1857 and Crétin's death—the foundation walls had not yet progressed beyond the water table at that time—the church was completed in 1858. The church was built of stone, measured 175 feet (53 m) long and 100 feet (30 m) wide, but had practically no ornamentation in an effort to cut costs. Thomas Grace was the bishop at the time the cathedral was completed. The first Mass was celebrated in the cathedral on June 13, 1858. The building cost a total of $33,647 ($1.21 million in 2025).

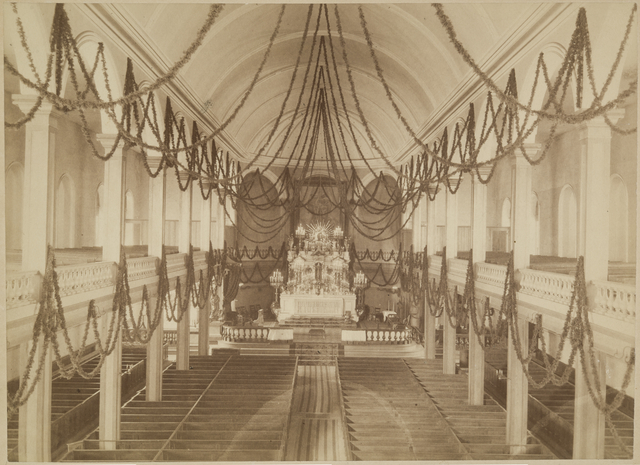
The interior of the cathedral decorated for the triple-episcopal consecration on December 27, 1889

=== Use ===
The building served as the cathedral of the diocese from 1858 until 1914. During the winter, Mass would be celebrated in the basement. Several significant liturgies happened in the third cathedral: John Ireland was consecrated as a bishop on December 21, 1875, and the triple consecration of James McGolrick, John Shanley, and Joseph Cotter took place on December 27, 1889. The funeral of Thomas Grace took place in the cathedral on February 24, 1897. James Trobec was consecrated on September 21, 1897. Alexander Christie was consecrated on June 29, 1898. James Keane and John Stariha were consecrated on October 28, 1902. James Trobec had also been ordained a priest in the third cathedral on September 8, 1865, and Thomas O'Gorman likewise was ordained a priest there on November 5, 1865.

=== Final years ===
The building still was too small for the needs of the diocese, and plans for a larger cathedral at a different site began to be developed. Archbishop John Ireland took on the task and purchased land for a fourth cathedral in 1904 and construction began in 1907. The final Mass was said on August 30, 1914, and it was demolished shortly thereafter to construct a department store. Between the demolition and the dedication of the fourth and present cathedral in 1915, the parish worshipped in the auditorium of the cathedral school, at the time on Kellogg Boulevard.

== Architecture ==
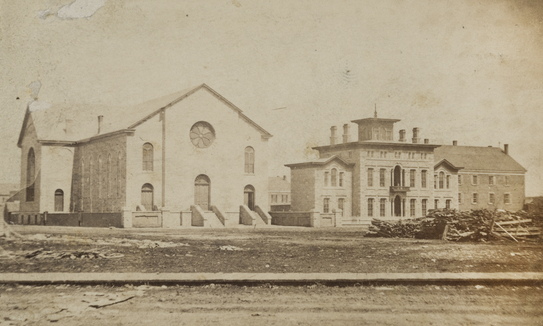
The cathedral and bishop's residence c. 1860

The style of the 175 feet (53 m) long and 100 feet (30 m) wide church has been called "blocky" and "vaguely Romanesque". It had a rose window above the main entrance, below the low-pitched gable roof. It was constructed of blue limestone.

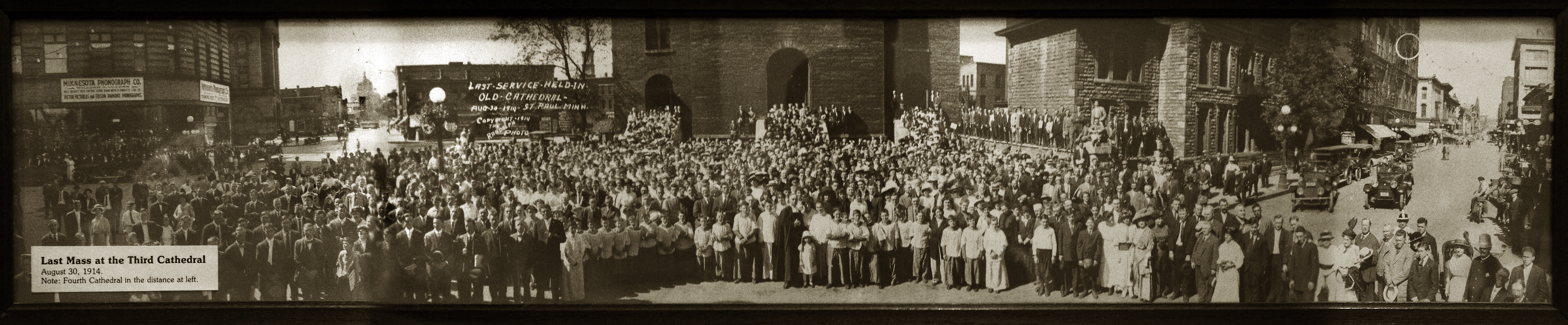
A photo at the last Mass at the third cathedral, with the fourth cathedral in background to the left

== See also ==
- First Cathedral of Saint Paul (Minnesota)
- Second Cathedral of Saint Paul (Minnesota)
- Cathedral of Saint Paul (Minnesota) — the current cathedral
