= Barnes County Courthouse =

- U.S. National Register of Historic Places
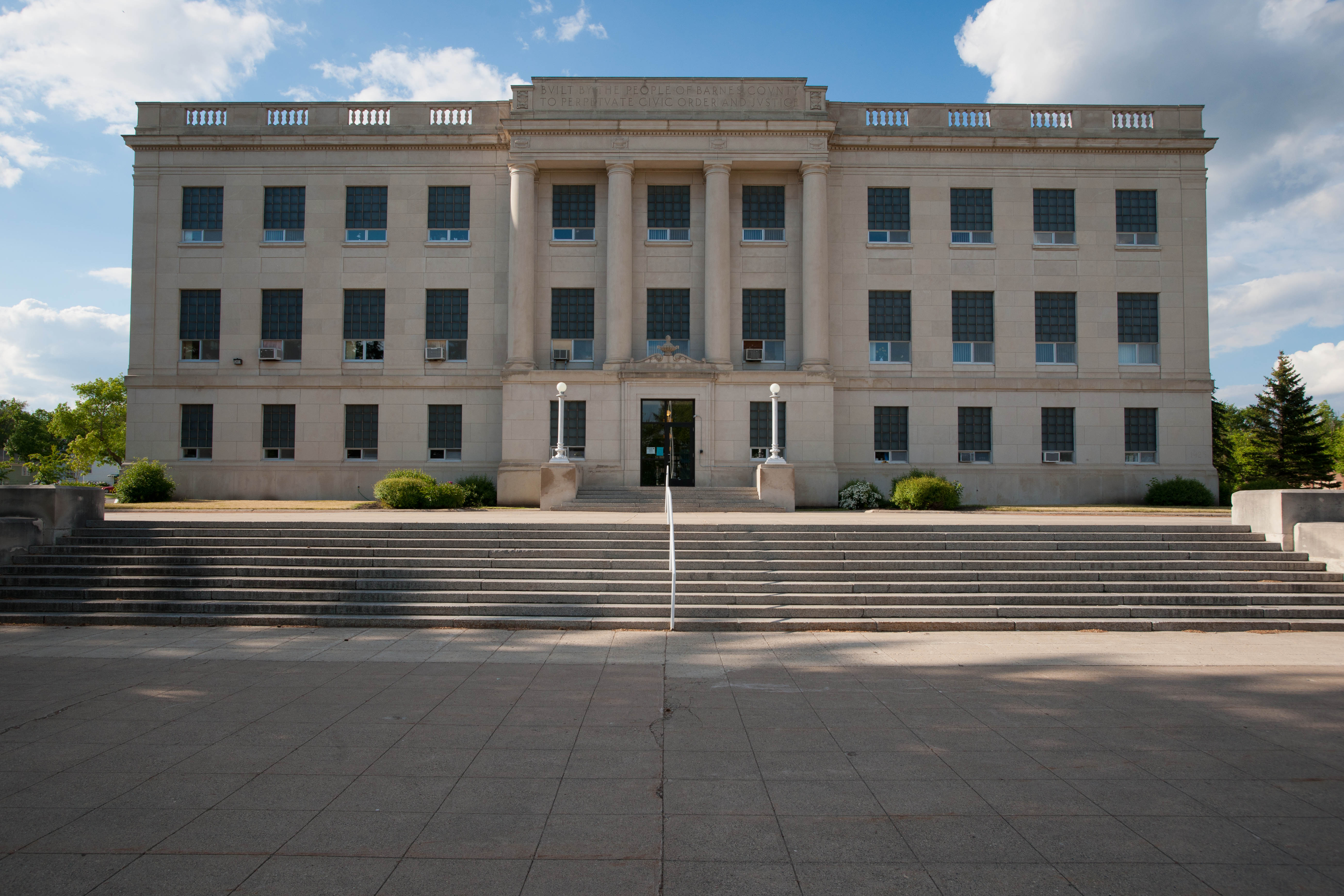
- Barnes County Courthouse in 2009

- Location within North Dakota Location within the United States
- Interactive map showing the location of Barnes County Courthouse
- Location: 491 Second Ave. NW, Valley City, North Dakota
- Coordinates: 46°55′38″N 98°0′18″W
- Area: 3.1 acres (1.3 ha)
- Built: 1925
- Built by: Butler Bros.
- Architect: Toltz, King & Day
- Architectural style: Classical Revival
- MPS: North Dakota County Courthouses TR
- NRHP reference No.: 85002978
- Added to NRHP: November 14, 1985

The Barnes County Courthouse in Valley City, North Dakota was built in 1925. "It is one of three distinctive county buildings in North Dakota (the others Ward and Burke counties) which were designed by the Minneapolis, Minnesota, firm Toltz, King, and Day."

It was listed on the National Register of Historic Places in 1985.

The courthouse has Doric columns. On the frieze is inscribed: "BUILT FOR THE PEOPLE OF BARNES COUNTY TO PERPETUATE ORDER AND JUSTICE".

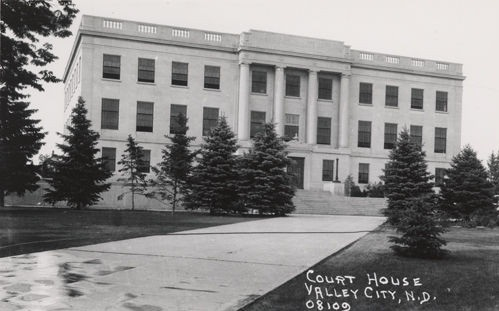
Barnes County Courthouse, c. 1950
