= Saint Joseph's Academy (Saint Paul, Minnesota) =

- St. Joseph's Academy
- U.S. National Register of Historic Places
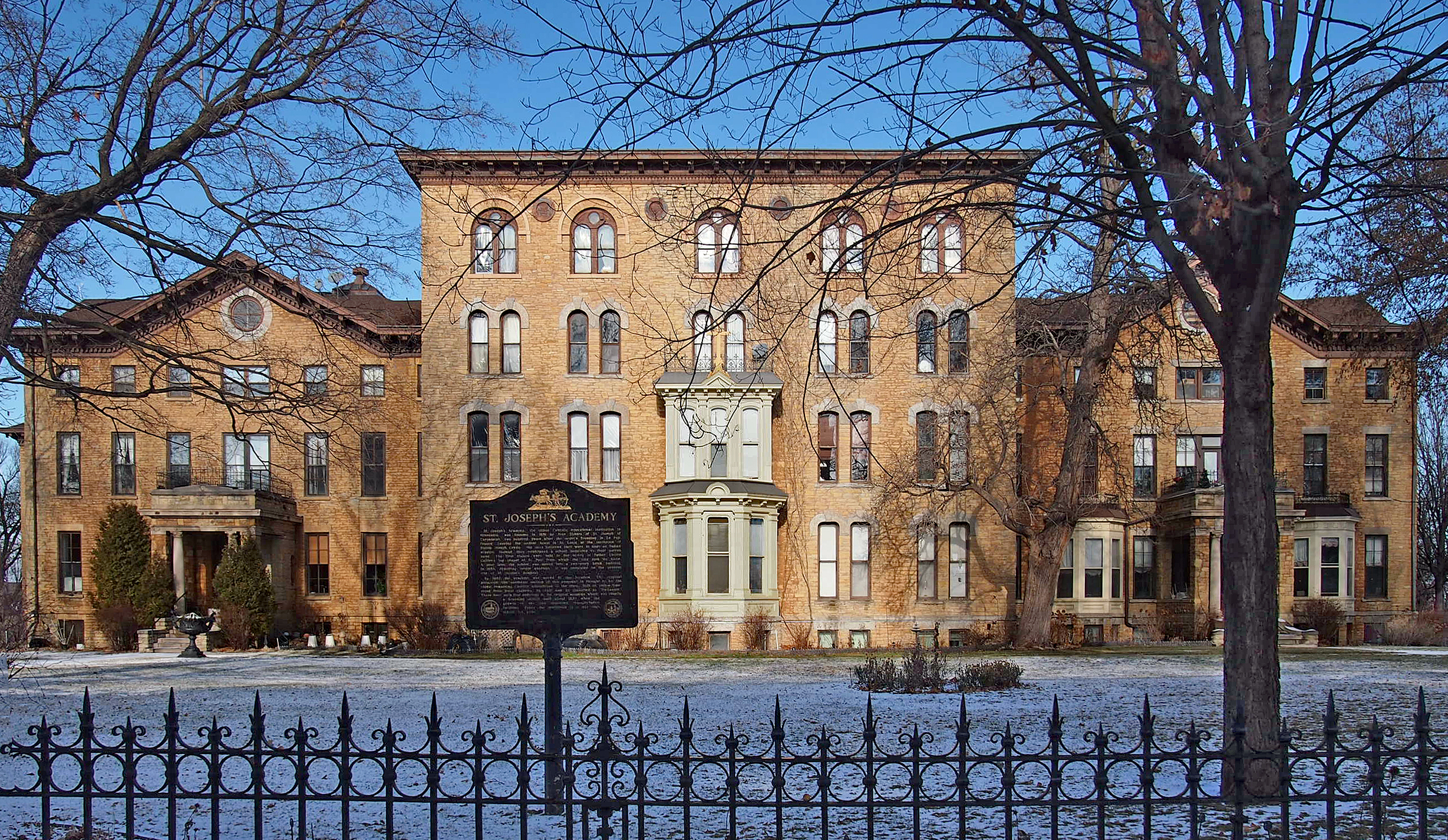
- St. Joseph's Academy from the south, with the oldest section on the left

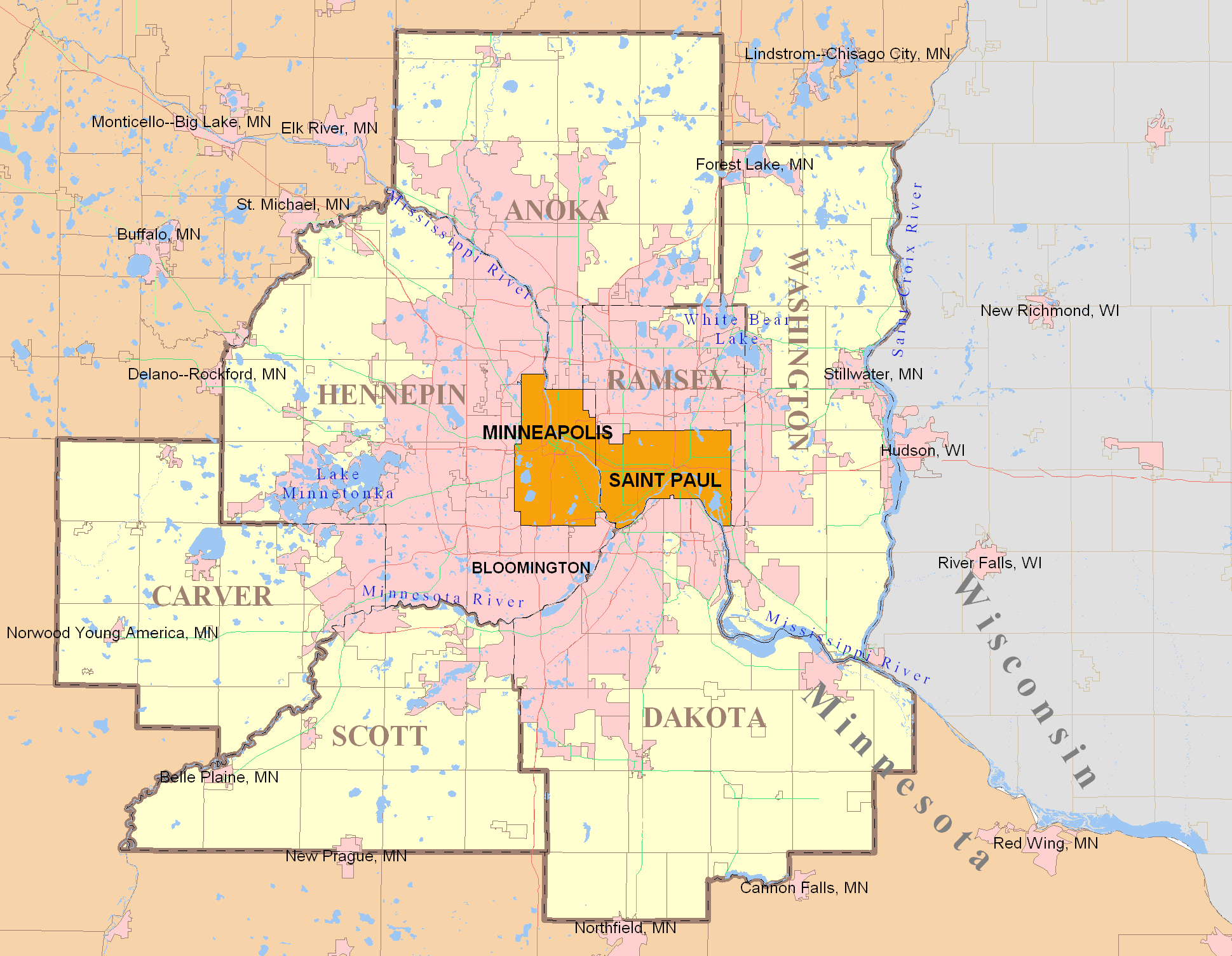
- Location within Minneapolis–Saint Paul Location within Minnesota Location within the United States
- Location: 355 Marshall Avenue, Saint Paul, Minnesota
- Coordinates: 44°56′55.5″N 93°6′55.5″W
- Area: 1 acre (0.4 ha)
- Built: 1860–1863, 1871, 1877, 1888
- Architectural style: Italianate
- NRHP reference No.: 75001016
- Added to NRHP: June 5, 1975

St. Joseph's Academy was a Catholic school for girls in St. Paul, Minnesota, United States, from 1851 to 1971. Its origins trace to 1851, when the Sisters of St. Joseph opened a school for girls in a log cabin in the frontier settlement. In 1863 the school relocated to a new building, which was expanded over the following decades into a complex that still stands today as the oldest extant Catholic school building in the state of Minnesota.

The school complex was listed on the National Register of Historic Places in 1975 for its local significance in the themes of architecture, education, and religion. It was nominated for being the state's oldest known Catholic school, a longstanding local landmark, and a symbol of a religious group's early educational efforts on the American frontier.

== History ==
Fifteen years after the Sisters of St. Joseph of Carondelet arrived in Missouri from Lyon, France, four of the Sisters came to Minnesota Territory. Joseph Crétin, the first Roman Catholic Bishop of St. Paul, had asked them for help with the work facing the growing community. The four Sisters of St. Joseph arrived by steamboat and settled on the banks of the Mississippi River in November 1851. Within a week they opened their first school in the vestry of a log chapel, the forerunner of the Cathedral of St. Paul.

When the need for more space became apparent, the Sisters acquired land on what was then the outskirts of the city, in an area known as St. Anthony Hill (now Cathedral Hill). In 1863 the first building that became St. Joseph's Academy was built on the corner of Marshall and Western Avenues. This three-and-a-half-story limestone building is one of the oldest in St. Paul.

Growth spurred the construction of more buildings on the property to house new programs and more classrooms. From 1863, St. Joseph's Academy had been a boarding school, too distant for daily commutes. This ended in 1905, when the city had grown and more streetcar lines became available in St. Paul. By 1926, St. Joseph's Academy had become one of the early St. Paul high schools.

In the early 20th century, the Academy's curriculum featured a well-equipped science laboratory. As the catalog stated, there was also a "collection of specimens for botanical and geological study". The commercial department expanded so that students could choose between working after high school and taking college preparation courses.

During this period of growth from 1882–1930, St. Joseph's was also home to Ellen Ireland, a high achiever and one of the high school's first graduates. Ireland entered the St. Joseph's convent and became Mother Seraphine, leader of the sisters in the St. Paul Province. Except for temporary assignments at other convents, St. Joseph's Academy was her lifelong home. She joined her brother, Archbishop John Ireland, in helping to expand the academy. Together they prepared the way for the founding of the College of St. Catherine (now St. Catherine University) in 1905.

In 1901 graduates of St. Joseph's Academy formed an alumnae association and began their newsletter, Chapter Chats. Although the newsletter lapsed for a number of years, the tradition was reinstated in 1931. In the early 21st century the St. Joseph's Academy Alumnae Association continues to send Chapter Chats to thousands of members.

St. Joseph's Academy was home to many accomplished teachers over the years. Several of the Sisters also contributed their talents to the wider community. Among them was Sister Mary Aloysius Sherin, a celebrated math and science teacher from 1935 to 1955. In 1938 Sister Ann Thomasine Sampson became director of the St. Joseph's Academy Glee Club. The group was in demand for many community-wide events in St. Paul. After retirement, Sister Ann Thomasine conducted oral histories of a number of Sisters. The histories are still available in the archives of the Sisters of St. Joseph.

Sister Irmina Kelehan, an English teacher at St. Joseph's, responded in 1956 to a request from the Japanese government to open a school in Tsu, Japan. She joined several other Sisters of St. Joseph from around the United States and opened a school for girls. They named it St. Joseph's Academy.

In 1971, enrollment declined while the costs of maintaining older buildings kept rising. The Sisters decided it was time to close St. Joseph's Academy and turn to other ministries. The property and buildings were sold to Christ's Household of Faith.

== Alumnae ==
Mary MacGregor, singer, Class of 1966.

== See also ==
- National Register of Historic Places listings in Ramsey County, Minnesota
