= Toltz, King & Day =

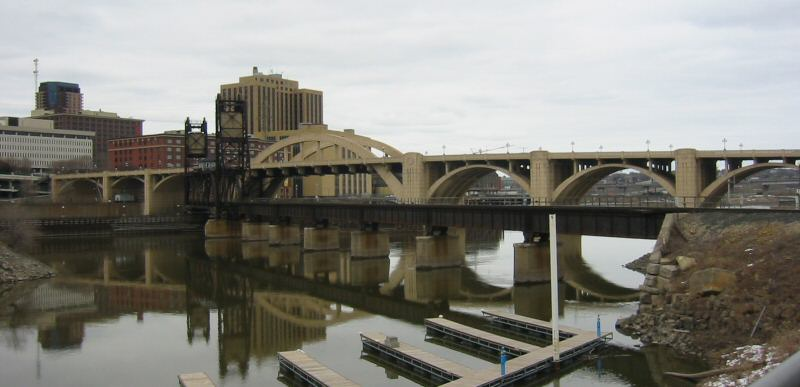
Robert Street Bridge

Toltz, King & Day was an architectural and engineering firm in Minnesota, which is now TKDA.

The firm was founded in 1910 by Maximilian Toltz (1857–1932), formerly the chief engineer for the Great Northern Railway under James J. Hill, and Wesley E. King (1879–1959), a civil and structural engineer. Toltz Engineering Company participated in the design of the Como Park Conservatory in 1915. A staff architect, Roy Childs Jones, completed the Hamm Building in 1920.

In 1919, Beaver Wade Day (1884–1931) joined the firm, and it was renamed to Toltz, King and Day. The firm designed the Stearns County Courthouse in St. Cloud, Minnesota in 1920 and provided structural engineering services for the Saint Paul Union Depot in 1923. In 1926, they completed the design of the Robert Street Bridge spanning the Mississippi River in St. Paul. The bridge, a rainbow arch design, had several challenges that resulted in its unusual form. The bridge had to reach Kellogg Boulevard at street level at the top of the bluff, while providing enough clearance underneath for the raised platform at the Saint Paul Union Depot, the Chicago Great Western lift bridge, and the passage of riverboats on the river. The bridge was rebuilt in 1989 by the same firm, now known as TKDA.

In 1956, the firm changed its name to Toltz, King, Duvall, Anderson, and Associates, to acknowledge civil engineer Arndt Duvall, architect Gerald Anderson, and other architects and engineers. Arndt Duvall became president of the firm in 1959, after King's death.

== List of projects and designs ==
A number of its works are listed on the U.S. National Register of Historic Places.

Projects designed by Toltz, King & Day, or its successor TKDA, include:

- Aitkin County Courthouse and Jail, Beaux-Arts, 209 and 217 2nd St., NW Aitkin, MN, 1929; NRHP-listed
- Barnes County Courthouse, 491 Second Ave. NW Valley City, ND, 1925; NRHP-listed
- Burke County Courthouse, Main St. Bowbells, ND, 1928; NRHP-listed
- Hamm Building, 408 St. Peter Street, St. Paul MN, 1920; NRHP-listed
- Design of 15 stations on the Blue Line light rail project, 2004
- I-35W Saint Anthony Falls Bridge approach roadways, signage, lighting, and other support services, 2008
- Krank Manufacturing Company building, 1855 W. University Ave. St. Paul, MN, 1926; NRHP-listed
- Northstar Line design and construction management, 2009
- Renovation of the Pioneer and Endicott Buildings, 1983
- Prince of Wales Hotel, Waterton Lakes National Park in Alberta, Canada, 1927; designated as a National Historic Site of Canada
- Robert Street Bridge, Robert St. over Mississippi River St. Paul, MN, 1926; NRHP-listed
- Stearns County Courthouse, 705 Courthouse Sq. St. Cloud, MN, 1921; NRHP-listed
- Connection between Vincent and Murphy Halls at the University of Minnesota's Twin Cities campus, 1960; NRHP-listed
- Wabasha Street Bridge over the Mississippi River in Saint Paul, 1996
- Ward County Courthouse, 315 Third St. SE Minot, ND, 1930; NRHP-listed

Donated papers of the firm are stored and available at the University of Minnesota.
