= Poughkeepsie plan =

The Poughkeepsie plan or Faribault–Stillwater plan was an arrangement contrived in 1873 in Poughkeepsie, New York, to satisfy both the desire of American Catholics to educate their children in a Catholic environment and their preference to have schooling paid for with public funds.

== Plan ==
The arrangement was worked out between Father Patrick F. McSweeny and the Poughkeepsie School Board. From the 1840s, the school board rented almost all rooms and buildings used as schools in an effort to keep costs low. Over the decades, the school board rented several churches on weekdays and sundry other kinds of buildings, including theaters that stood vacant during the day and disused factories.

In 1873, Father McSweeny, rector of St. Peter's parish and its parochial school, approached the school board with what historian Benjamin Justice calls "an offer it could not refuse", the use of two newly renovated parochial school buildings for the rent of $1 per year. The school board would pay for all school operating expenses and repairs. The parish would retain ownership of the buildings and complete use of them outside school hours.

The arrangement was that the school board hired nuns belonging to the Sisters of Charity, who taught wearing their habits.

For his part, Father McSweeny agreed, "No religious exercises to be held, nor religious instruction given during the school hours." The schools were formally non-sectarian, admitting children of all faiths, but in practice, they were attended by the children of Catholic families.

From the perspective of the city, the virtually-free buildings meant that the schools cost only half what other public schools cost to operate. The Catholic parents and church were pleased because the school board agreed to define the school day as running from 9 a.m. to noon and from 1:30 p.m. to 4 p.m. In practical terms, that meant that the 8:45 morning prayers took place before school hours, a short prayer was held after the official morning session ended at noon, a 30-minute period of religious instruction took place after the lunch hour but before the school day resumed, and a closing prayer was said after the school day ended.

== Response ==
A Catholic newspaper, the New York Freeman, condemned the plan as a watering down of true Catholic education. Most of the negative responses, however, came as part of the broader debate over America's common schools from people committed to the idea that having all children attend the same public school was an important way of Americanizing the children of immigrants. Historian Benjamin Justice was unable to discover that there was any opposition in Poughkeepsie itself.

Archbishop John Ireland of the Archdiocese of Saint Paul and Minneapolis admired the plan and put it into effect in two towns in his diocese, Faribault, Minnesota, and Stillwater, Minnesota. Because Ireland was regarded as dangerously Modernist by many other senior members of the hierarchy of the Catholic Church in the era, his support for the Poughkeepsie plan probably helped crystallize Catholic opposition to the model.

In 1898, the New York State Superintendent of Schools ruled the plan illegal. The plan ended when he threatened to cut off school funding to Poughkeepsie.
