= Krank Manufacturing Company building =

- Krank Manufacturing Company
- U.S. National Register of Historic Places
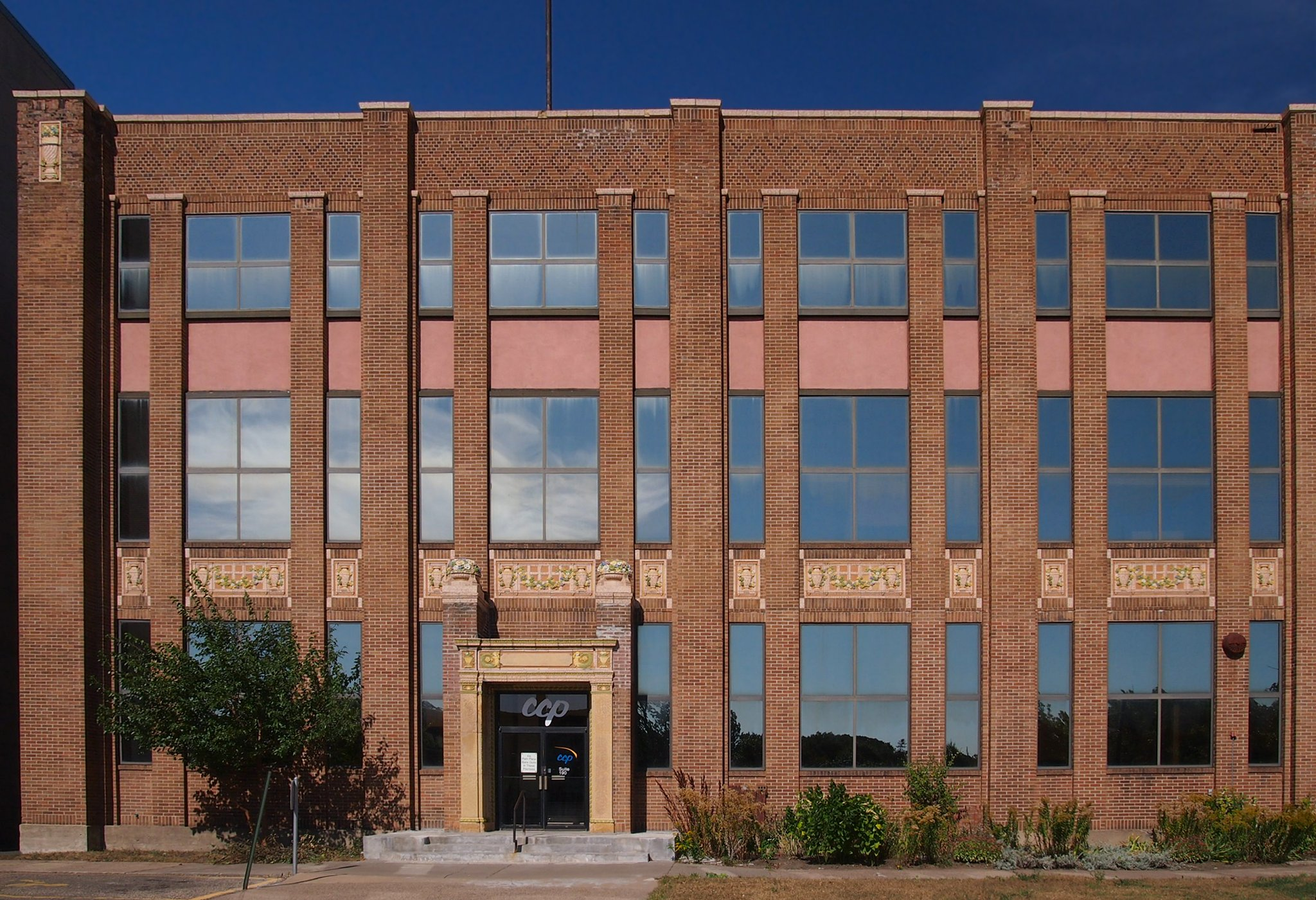

- Location within Minnesota Location within the United States
- Location: 1855 University Avenue West; Saint Paul, Minnesota
- Coordinates: 44°57′25″N 93°10′45″W
- Built: 1926
- Architect: Toltz, King & Day; Pike, Cook & Co.
- Architectural style: Early Commercial
- NRHP reference No.: 83000934
- Added to NRHP: February 24, 1983

The Krank Manufacturing Company building in Saint Paul, Minnesota, United States, is a 1926 industrial building featuring glazed terracotta panels with brightly carved floral and classical motifs. It is listed on the National Register of Historic Places. The company made cosmetics, creams and shampoos.

== Gallery ==
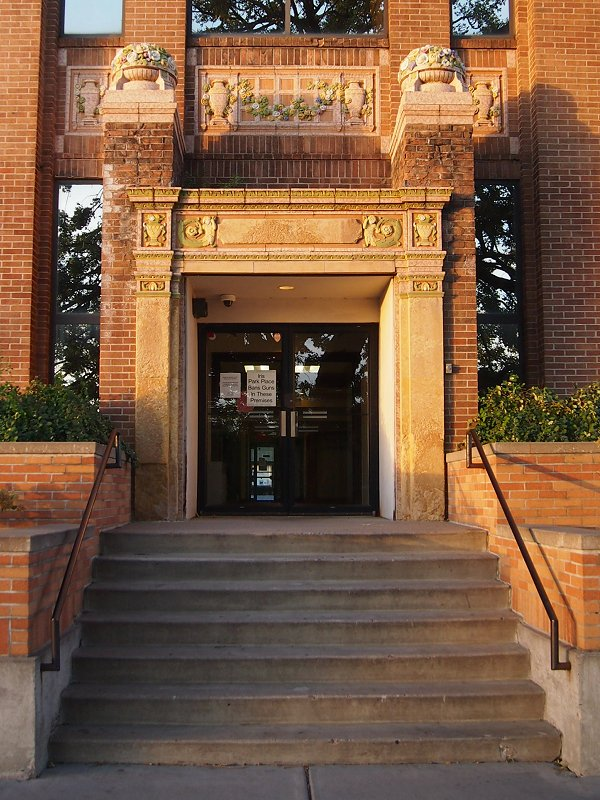
Detail of doorway with terracotta panels
