= Burke County Courthouse (North Dakota) =

- U.S. National Register of Historic Places
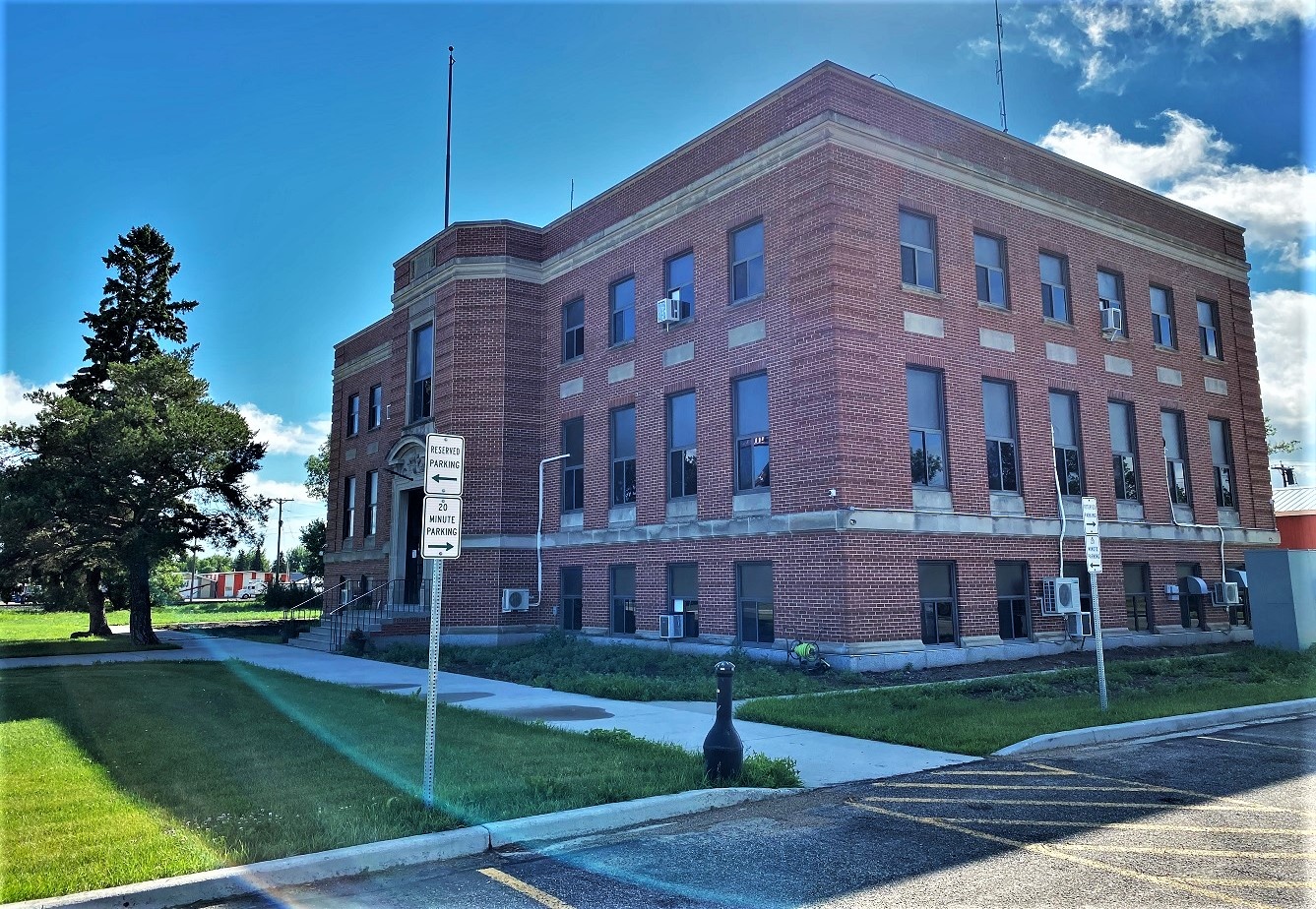

- Location within North Dakota Location within the United States
- Interactive map showing the location of Burke County Courthouse
- Location: Main Street; Bowbells, North Dakota
- Coordinates: 48°48′3″N 102°14′53″W
- Area: 2.1 acres (0.85 ha)
- Built: 1928
- Built by: Olson & Orheim
- Architect: Toltz, King & Day
- Architectural style: Federal, Adamesque
- MPS: North Dakota County Courthouses TR
- NRHP reference No.: 85002979
- Added to NRHP: November 14, 1985

The Burke County Courthouse in Bowbells, North Dakota, was built in 1928. It was designed by the Minneapolis firm of Toltz, King, and Day, who also designed the Barnes County Courthouse and the Ward County Courthouse.

It was listed on the National Register of Historic Places in 1985 for its significance in county history and for its architecture.
