= Stearns County Courthouse =

- Stearns County Courthouse and Jail
- U.S. National Register of Historic Places
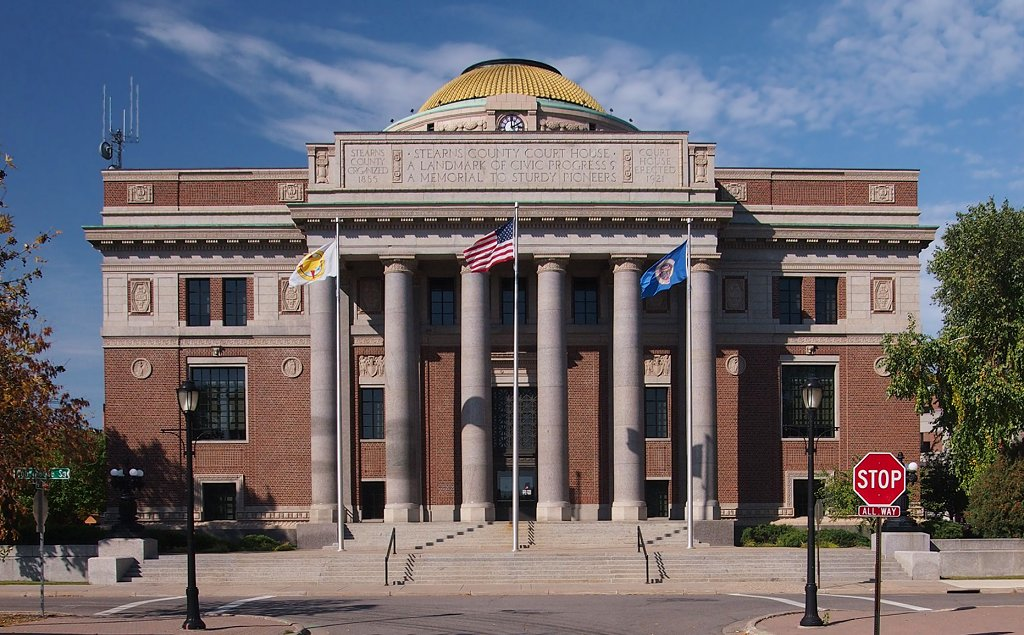
- The Stearns County Courthouse viewed from the southeast

- Location within Minnesota Location within the United States
- Interactive map showing the location of Stearns County Courthouse
- Location: 705 Courthouse Square, St. Cloud, Minnesota
- Coordinates: 45°33′38″N 94°9′45″W
- Area: 1.5 acres (0.6 ha)
- Built: 1921–1922
- Built by: Charles Skooglun
- Architect: Toltz, King & Day (courthouse), Louis Pinault (jail)
- Architectural style: Beaux-Arts (courthouse), Prairie School (jail)
- MPS: Stearns County MRA
- NRHP reference No.: 82003056
- Added to NRHP: April 15, 1982

The Stearns County Courthouse is the seat of government for Stearns County in St. Cloud, Minnesota, United States. The Beaux-Arts style building was constructed in 1921 to replace Stearns County's original 1864 courthouse. It stands in a prominent square in downtown St. Cloud, flanked by other government buildings. A Prairie School style jail was built to the northeast in 1922, and the two buildings were listed as the Stearns County Courthouse and Jail on the National Register of Historic Places in 1982 for having local significance in the themes of architecture and politics/government. They were nominated for being prominent symbols of Stearns County government. The 1922 jail building was demolished in 1987.

== See also ==
- List of county courthouses in Minnesota
- National Register of Historic Places listings in Stearns County, Minnesota
