= Ward County Courthouse =

- U.S. National Register of Historic Places
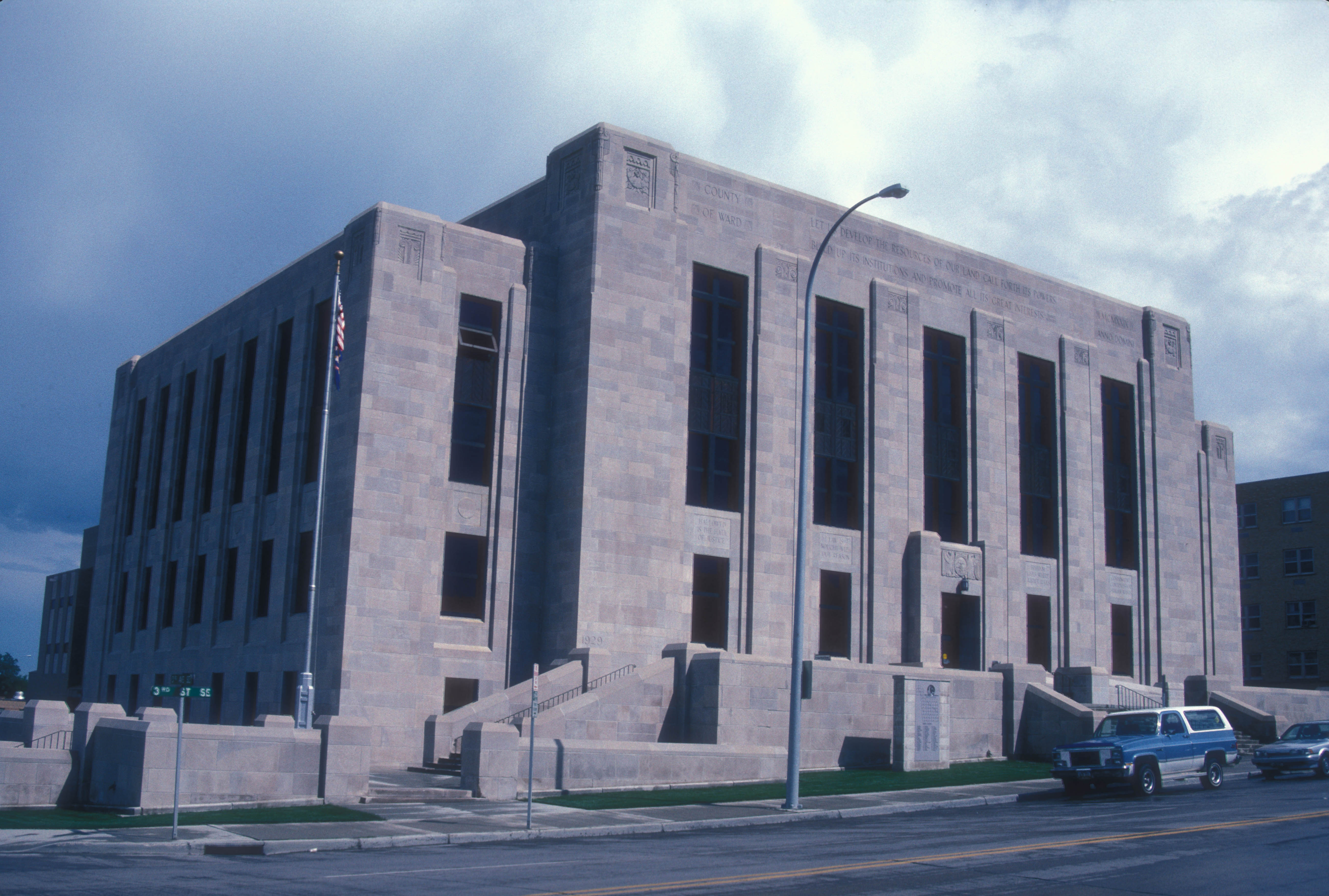

- Location within North Dakota Location within the United States
- Interactive map showing the location of Ward County Courthouse
- Location: 315 Third St. SE, Minot, North Dakota
- Coordinates: 48°13′59″N 101°17′15″W
- Area: 1.6 acres (0.65 ha)
- Built: 1929
- Built by: Olson & Orheim
- Architect: Toltz, King & Day
- Architectural style: Art Deco
- MPS: North Dakota County Courthouses TR
- NRHP reference No.: 85002997
- Added to NRHP: November 14, 1985

The Ward County Courthouse in Minot, North Dakota was built in 1929. Along with two other "distinctive county buildings in North Dakota", the Barnes County Courthouse and the Burke County Courthouse, it was designed by the Minneapolis, Minnesota, firm Toltz, King, and Day.

Costing $498,000, it was the most expensive county courthouse built in the state for almost 30 years.

It was listed on the National Register of Historic Places in 1985.
