= Joseph Crétin =

First Roman Catholic Bishop of Saint Paul, Minnesota (1799–1857)

The Right Reverend Joseph Crétin
- Bishop of St. Paul
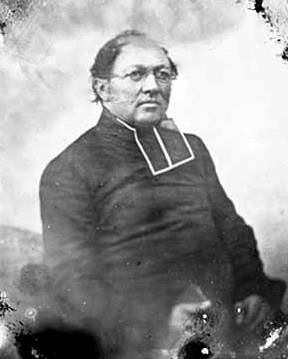
- Church: Catholic Church
- Diocese: St. Paul
- Appointed: July 23, 1850
- Term ended: February 22, 1857
- Predecessor: Office established
- Successor: Thomas Grace

Orders
- Ordination: December 20, 1823 by Alexandre-Raymond Devie
- Consecration: January 26, 1851 by Alexandre-Raymond Devie

Personal details
- Born: December 9, 1799 Montluel, Ain, France
- Died: February 22, 1857 (aged 57) St. Paul, Minnesota, U.S.

Joseph Crétin (December 9, 1799 (Note: According to The Church Founders of the Northwest, in the civil records of Montluel, the date of his birth was reported in the French Republican calendar as "The Nineteenth day of Frimaire, the Eighth year of the French Republic." In the Gregorian calendar, this is December 9, 1799. That date was confirmed by Crétin himself, who declared that he was born "in Montluel, Department of Ain, France, December 9, 1799; baptized December 11, 1799.") – February 22, 1857) was an American Catholic prelate who served as the first bishop of St. Paul from 1851 until his death in 1857.

== Early life and education ==
Joseph Crétin was born on December 9, 1799, in Montluel, in the Ain department of eastern France. His father, also named Joseph Crétin, worked as an innkeeper and baker. His mother, Mary Crétin (née Mery), was once imprisoned during the French Revolution for her Catholic faith. His great-uncle, Benoit Poncet, was a Carthusian monk who was executed by guillotine for refusing to swear an oath in support of the Civil Constitution of the Clergy.

Crétin received his early education from the abbé at Montluel, and followed him when he was appointed to Courzieu in the neighboring department of Rhône. From 1814 to 1817, he attended the minor seminary at Meximieux, where one of his professors was Father Mathias Loras. He continued his studies at the minor seminaries in Sainte-Foy-l'Argentière and Alix. In 1820, he entered Saint-Sulpice Seminary in Paris, where he completed his theological studies.

== Priesthood ==
=== Ministry in France ===
On December 20, 1823, Crétin was ordained to the priesthood by Bishop Alexandre-Raymond Devie of the Diocese of Belley. He celebrated his first Mass at the church of Saint-Etienne in his native Montluel, where he was assisted by Father John Stephen Bazin (the future Bishop of Vincennes in Indiana). He was then appointed an assistant to the pastor of the church of Notre-Dame-et-Saint-André at Ferney-Voltaire. During this time, other priests of the Diocese of Belley included Fathers John Vianney and Peter Chanel, both of whom were later canonized.

While an assistant at Ferney-Voltaire, Crétin toured through France to raise funds for the construction of a new church building, which was consecrated in 1826. He also established a college for boys. During the July Revolution of 1830, he and the college's faculty and students withstood a mob that tried to overtake the school. In the spring of 1831, Crétin was nominated to become pastor of Notre-Dame-et-Saint-André by Bishop Devie, but this had to be approved by the Minister of Worship. He faced opposition from supporters of King Louis Philippe I, who considered him unloyal to the new government. However, his nomination was confirmed in December of that year and he remained pastor until 1838.

=== Missionary in the United States ===
Crétin had a desire to become a foreign missionary, and originally thought about working in China. In 1838, his former professor at Meximieux, Mathias Loras (then Bishop of Dubuque in the Iowa Territory), returned to France to recruit priests for his diocese. Crétin volunteered, and he departed in August 1838 alongside Bishop Loras, Father J. A. M. Pelamourgues, and seminarians Lucien Galtier and Augustin Ravoux. They landed at New York City in October and at St. Louis in November, but had to wait several months for the frozen Mississippi River to thaw before sailing to Iowa. They finally arrived in Dubuque in April 1839.

Upon his arrival in Dubuque, Loras appointed Crétin as vicar general of the diocese and rector of St. Raphael's Cathedral. In addition to these responsibilities, he served as the first president of St. Raphael's Seminary (now Loras College). In 1841, he succeeded Father Ravoux as pastor of St. Gabriel's Church at Prairie du Chien in the Wisconsin Territory.

During this time, Crétin also served as a missionary among the Winnebago Native Americans. In 1844, James MacGregor, the local Indian agent, nominated Crétin to be superintendent of the federal school for Winnebago children in Fort Atkinson, calling him "a highly intelligent and useful man [who is] universally respected by all classes." However, Governor John Chambers refused to consider Crétin and fired MacGregor. More than two dozen Winnebago people later sent a petition to President James K. Polk to install Crétin at the school, but this was also unsuccessful. Crétin then attempted to establish a Catholic school for Winnebago children a few miles from the federal school, but he was prohibited from doing so by Chambers, who wrote, "Missionary schools will not be permitted so near those under the control of the government as to produce a collision." In 1846, Chambers's successor, Governor James Clarke, offered to let Crétin build a Catholic school at least 30 miles from the federal school; Crétin rejected the proposal.

== Bishop of St. Paul ==
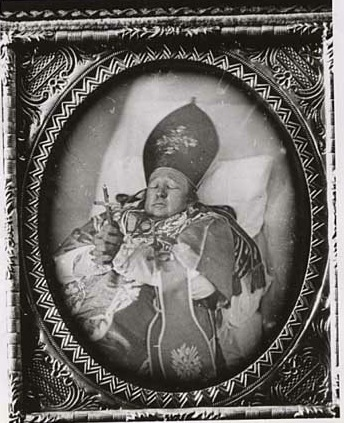
The body of Bishop Crétin lying in its casket.

At the seventh Provincial Council of Baltimore in May 1849, the bishops of the United States proposed the creation of the Diocese of St. Paul, covering all of the new Minnesota Territory, and the appointment of Crétin as its first bishop. It took over a year for the Holy See to approve the petition, as Pope Pius IX had fled the Roman Republic to Gaeta until April 1850. The papal bull creating the diocese was issued on July 19, 1850, and Crétin was confirmed as bishop on July 23.

A few months after his appointment, but before his consecration, Crétin traveled to France to recruit priests for his new diocese. While there, he was consecrated on January 26, 1851, by Bishop Devie of Belley, who had previously ordained him a priest. Georges Chalandon, Devie's coadjutor bishop, and Etienne Marilley, the exiled bishop of Lausanne, served as co-consecrators.

Crétin returned to the United States with six missionaries and was installed at St. Paul on July 2, 1851. At the time of his arrival, the diocese contained 3,000 Catholics and three priests—Father Ravoux at St. Paul and Fathers Georges-Antoine Belcourt and Albert Lacombe at Pembina. His first cathedral was a small log chapel that had been built in 1841. Within less than five months, he built a new cathedral, which also served as a school and residence for the bishop and clergy. A third cathedral was begun in 1855, but Crétin did not live to see it completed.

In his first year as bishop, Crétin introduced the Sisters of St. Joseph of Carondelet from St. Louis to the diocese; the Sisters started St. Joseph's Academy in the former log cabin cathedral, and later founded St. Joseph's Hospital in 1853. Crétin also introduced the Benedictines from Pennsylvania, who established St. John's Abbey (1856) and St. John's University (1857) in Collegeville.

By the end of his tenure, the diocese had 19 priests and 29 churches to serve a Catholic population of 50,000.

=== School issues ===
In 1853, Crétin petitioned the Minnesota Territorial Legislature for public funding of Catholic schools. A bill was introduced by Representatives John D. Ludden and William Pitt Murray, but it was denied a third reading by a 12–5 vote. Crétin attributed this failure to New Englanders who had settled in Minnesota, who he claimed had "imported from their former home their narrow eastern prejudices against liberty of conscience and the freedom of education."

In 1848, before Crétin arrived in Minnesota, the Winnebagoes he had previously served in Fort Atkinson, Iowa, were moved to Long Prairie, Minnesota. After becoming Bishop of St. Paul, he appointed Father Charles Francis de Vivaldi, whom he had recruited in Europe, to organize a Catholic mission among the Winnebagoes in Long Prairie. In May 1852, Crétin met personally with President Millard Fillmore to see if the federal government would give control of the Winnebago school in Long Prairie to the Catholic Church. Shortly afterward, the bishop recounted that Fillmore "would like to oblige Catholics, but not displease Protestants, so that up to now I have had only promises."

In January 1853, Crétin succeeded in obtaining control of the Winnebago school in Long Prairie, signing a five-year contract with Governor Alexander Ramsey that would provide the Church with $75 per student annually. He subsequently appointed Father de Vivaldi as superintendent of the school and assigned three Sisters of St. Joseph to assist him. However, the contract was opposed by figures like Alexander Wilkin, the secretary of the territory, and Abram M. Fridley, the local Indian agent. Fridley delayed payments to the Church, forcing Crétin to use diocesan funds for the school's maintenance.

In 1855, the Winnebagoes were moved to a new reservation along the Blue Earth River. Given the lack of payments, Crétin refused responsibility for the federal school at Blue Earth and voided the contract. Nevertheless, Father de Vivaldi remained as superintendent of the school until 1856, when he was removed by Governor Willis A. Gorman for financial mismanagement and other issues. De Vivaldi subsequently left the priesthood, married, and moved to Kansas; he was later appointed to the U.S. consulate in Brazil by President Abraham Lincoln, but then rejoined the Church and died in Paris.

== Death and legacy ==
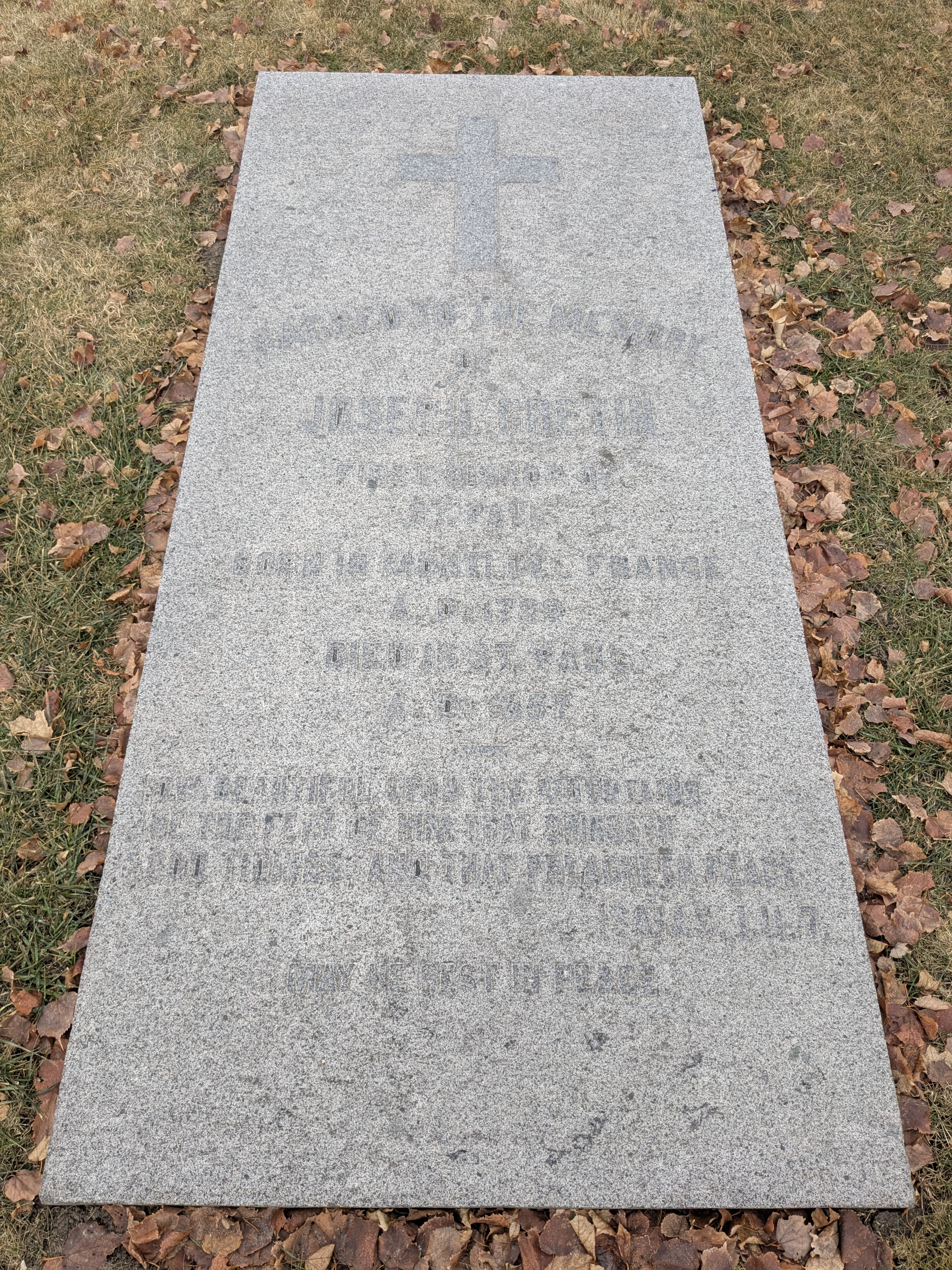
The grave of Bishop Crétin at Calvary Cemetery in St. Paul.

In early 1857, Crétin's health began to fail due to asthma and dropsy. He died at his residence in St. Paul on February 22, 1857, at the age of 57. He is buried at Calvary Cemetery.

Cretin Avenue in St. Paul, Cretin-Derham Hall High School, and Cretin Hall at the University of St. Thomas are named for him.

== Sources ==
- Hoffmann, M. M. (1937). The Church Founders of the Northwest. Milwaukee: Bruce Publishing Company.
- Reardon, James Michael (1952). The Catholic Church in the Diocese of St. Paul. North Central Publishing Company.

Catholic Church titles
Preceded by New creation	Bishop of St. Paul; 1851–1859	Succeeded by Thomas Grace
