= Augustin Ravoux =

French priest and missionary

Monsignor Augustin Ravoux
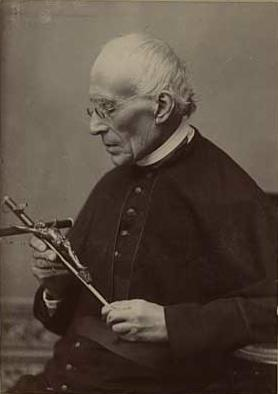
- Archdiocese: Archdiocese of Saint Paul and Minneapolis
- Metropolis: Minneapolis-Saint Paul
- Other posts: Administrator; February 22, 1857– 1859

Orders
- Ordination: January 5, 1840

Personal details
- Born: Augustin Ravoux; January 11, 1815 Langeac, Auvergne, France
- Died: January 17, 1906 (aged 91) Saint Paul, Minnesota, United States
- Buried: Calvary Cemetery
- Denomination: Roman Catholic

Augustin Ravoux (January 11, 1815 – January 17, 1906) was a French priest and missionary who served in the area preceding Archdiocese of Saint Paul and Minneapolis, in Minnesota.

== Biography ==
Ravoux was born in Langeac, Auvergne, France. He left his hometown for the Diocese in nearby Le Puy-en-Velay, and was inducted into the clergy via clerical tonsure on May 20, 1835. He received his minor orders nearly a year later on 28 May 1836, and became a subdeacon a year after that on 20 May 1837. While a subdeacon at the Grand séminaire in Le Puy-en-Velay, Ravoux was recruited by Bishop Mathias Loras, along with Vicar general Joseph Crétin, Reverend Pelamourgues, and fellow subdeacons Lucien Galtier, Remigius Petiot, and James Causse, to work as Jesuit missionaries out of the newly established Roman Catholic Archdiocese of Dubuque.

The group departed Le Havre on August 27, 1837, aboard the American brigantine Lion until their arrival in New York Harbor forty-four days later. Ravoux started learning the English language while en route and then formally afterwards at Mount St. Mary's University in Emmitsburg, Maryland. Traveled to Dubuque, where he was ordained along with Galtier on January 5, 1840.

Although recruited to act as a missionary to the Dakota, Ravoux began his career in the Americas at St. Gabriel's Parish in Prairie du Chien, Wisconsin, serving as its first regular pastor. It was at St. Gabriel's where Ravoux baptized his first Native American, in March 1840. He left Prairie du Chien to serve as a missionary in the Minnesota Territory in September 1841.

Upon arrival in the Minnesota Territory, Ravoux spent a few days with Galtier in Mendota before then setting out on his travels. He reached Traverse des Sioux after four days where he began his study of the Dakota language with Louis Provencal, a Frenchman who had been trading in the area for forty-five years. After a brief stop at Little Rock, Ravoux traveled to Lac qui Parle in January 1842. Early that spring, he returned to Mendota for the summer.Jean-Baptiste Faribault, a prolific and influential French Canadian trader with an established trading post in Little Prairie (present day Chaska), was an ardent proselytizer and invited Ravoux to his post to continue his linguistic studies.

In 1843, Ravoux journeyed to Dubuque for encouragement from Loras and then to Prairie du Chien for a few months. There he authored the Wakantanka ti ki Chanku (The Path to the House of God), a prayer book intended to explore the beautiful vocal abilities of the Dakota. The book was printed on a printing press belonging to Crétin, and translated from the French to Dakota by Alexander Faribault (son of Jean-Baptiste Faribault) and his brother Oliver and David.

Upon Crétin's death on February 22, 1857, Ravoux was named in sede vacante the sole administrator of the diocese of the Minnesota Territory by Bishop Kenrick of the Archdiocese of St. Louis, a position he served until the installment of Bishop Grace in 1859.

Brigadier General Henry Hastings Sibley, aware of Ravoux's favorable reputation among the Dakota, recommended him to baptize the Dakota involved in the Dakota War of 1862. Of the thirty-eight that were hung on December 26, 1862, Ravoux personally baptized 33. When Chief Shakopee and Medicine Bottle were captured in Manitoba, Ravoux baptized them and administered their Last Rites, accompanying them up until their final moments on November 11, 1865.

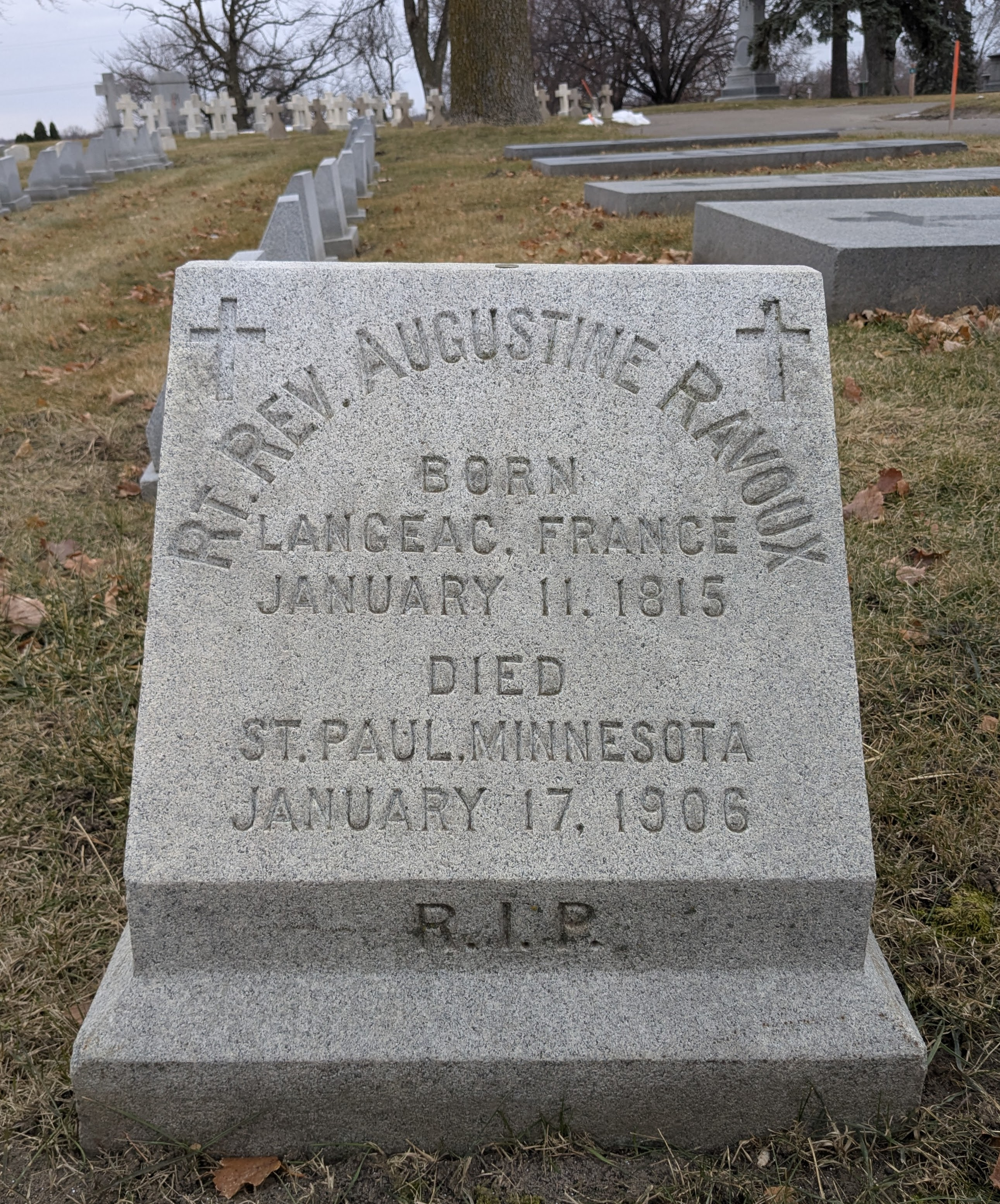
The grave of Father Augustine Ravoux at Calvary Cemetery in St. Paul, Minnesota

The final fifteen years of his life he spent incapacitated at St. Joseph's Hospital, where he died at the age of 91 on January 17, 1906. He was buried in Calvary Cemetery. Upon his death he had been a Vicar general for the diocese for 42 years, and a prelate in the Roman Catholic Church for 19 years.
