= John Ireland (bishop) =

Catholic archbishop of Saint Paul, Minnesota

The Most Reverend John Ireland
- Archbishop of Saint Paul
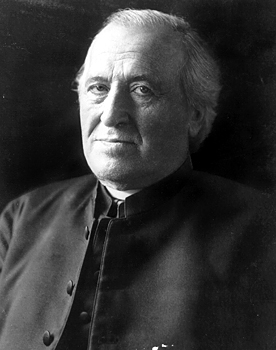
- Archdiocese: Saint Paul
- Diocese: Saint Paul
- Appointed: July 28, 1875
- Installed: July 31, 1884
- Term ended: September 25, 1918
- Predecessor: Thomas Grace
- Successor: Austin Dowling

Orders
- Ordination: December 21, 1861 by Joseph Crétin
- Consecration: December 21, 1875 by Thomas Grace, Michael Heiss, and Rupert Seidenbusch

Personal details
- Born: Burnchurch, County Kilkenny, Ireland, United Kingdom
- Baptised: 11 September 1838
- Died: September 25, 1918 (aged 80) Saint Paul, Minnesota

John Ireland (baptized September 11, 1838 – September 25, 1918) was an Irish-American prelate who was the third Catholic bishop and first archbishop of Saint Paul, Minnesota (1888–1918). He became both a religious as well as civic leader in Saint Paul during the turn of the 20th century. Ireland was known for his progressive stance on education, immigration and relations between church and state, as well as his opposition to saloons, alcoholism, political machines, and political corruption.

He promoted the Americanization of Catholicism, especially through imposing the English only movement on Catholic parishes by force, a private war against the Eastern Catholic Churches, seeking to make Catholic schools identical to public schools through the Poughkeepsie plan, and through other progressive social ideas. He was widely considered the primary leader of the modernizing element in the Catholic Church in the United States during the Progressive Era, which brought him into open conflict over minority language rights and theology with both his suffragan Bishop Otto Zardetti and eventually with Pope Leo XIII, whose Apostolic letter Testem benevolentiae nostrae condemned Archbishop Ireland's ideas as the heresy of Americanism. He also created or helped to create many religious and educational institutions in Minnesota.

== History ==
Styles of John Ireland
- Reference style: The Most Reverend
- Spoken style: Your Excellency
- Religious style: Monsignor

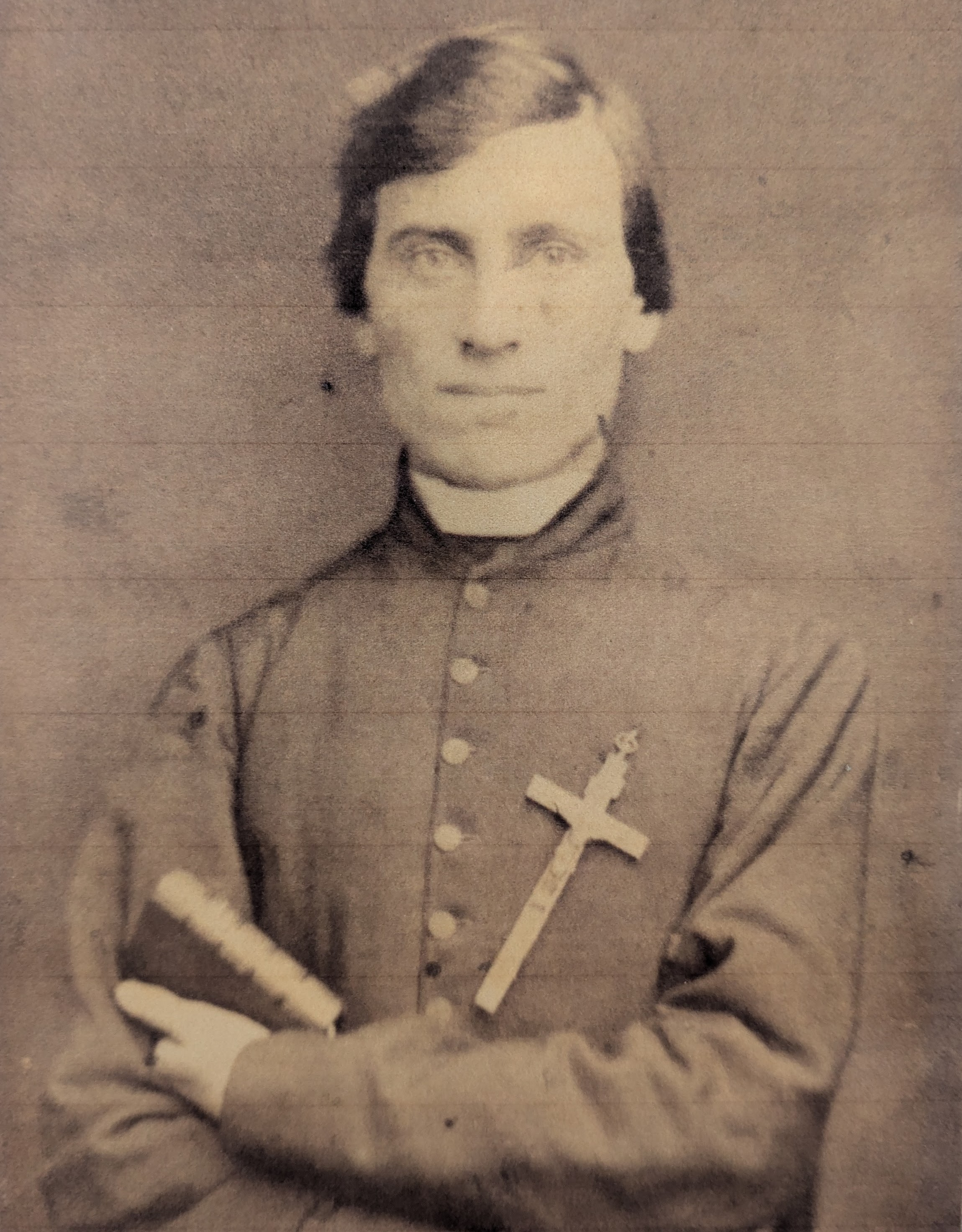
Father Ireland as a Civil War chaplain with the Fifth Minnesota Regiment

John Ireland was born in Burnchurch, County Kilkenny, Ireland, and was baptized on September 11, 1838. He was the second of seven children born to Richard Ireland, a carpenter, and his second wife, Judith Naughton. His family immigrated to the United States in 1848 and eventually moved to Saint Paul, Minnesota, in 1852. One year later Joseph Crétin, first bishop of Saint Paul, sent Ireland to the preparatory seminary of Meximieux in France. Ireland was consequently ordained in 1861 in Saint Paul. He served as a chaplain of the Fifth Minnesota Regiment in the Civil War until 1863 when ill health caused his resignation. Later, he was famous nationwide in the Grand Army of the Republic.

He was appointed pastor at Saint Paul's cathedral in 1867, a position which he held until 1875. In 1875, he was made coadjutor bishop of St. Paul and in 1884, he became bishop ordinary. In 1888, he became archbishop with the elevation of his diocese and the erection of the ecclesiastical province of Saint Paul. Ireland retained this title for 30 years until his death in 1918. Before Ireland died he burned all his personal papers. He was buried in Calvary Cemetery.

Ireland was personal friends with Presidents William McKinley and Theodore Roosevelt. At a time when most Irish Catholics were staunch Democrats, Ireland was known for being close to the Republican party. Privately Ireland would tell people he was a member of the party. He opposed racial inequality and called for "equal rights and equal privileges, political, civil, and social." Ireland's funeral was attended by eight archbishops, thirty bishops, twelve monsignors, seven hundred priests and two hundred seminarians.

He was awarded an honorary doctorate (LL.D.) by Yale University in October 1901, during celebrations for the bicentenary of the university.

A friend of James J. Hill, whose wife Mary was Catholic (even though Hill was not), Archbishop Ireland had his portrait painted in 1895 by the Swiss-born American portrait painter Adolfo Müller-Ury almost certainly on Hill's behalf, which was exhibited at M. Knoedler & Co., New York, January 1895 (lost) and again in 1897 (Archdiocesan Archives, Archdiocese of Saint Paul & Minneapolis).

== Legacy ==
The influence of his personality made Archbishop Ireland a commanding figure in many important movements, especially those for total abstinence, for colonization in the Northwest, and modern education. Ireland became a leading civic and religious leader during the late 19th and early 20th centuries in Saint Paul. He worked closely with non-Catholics and was recognized by them as a leader of the Modernist Catholics.

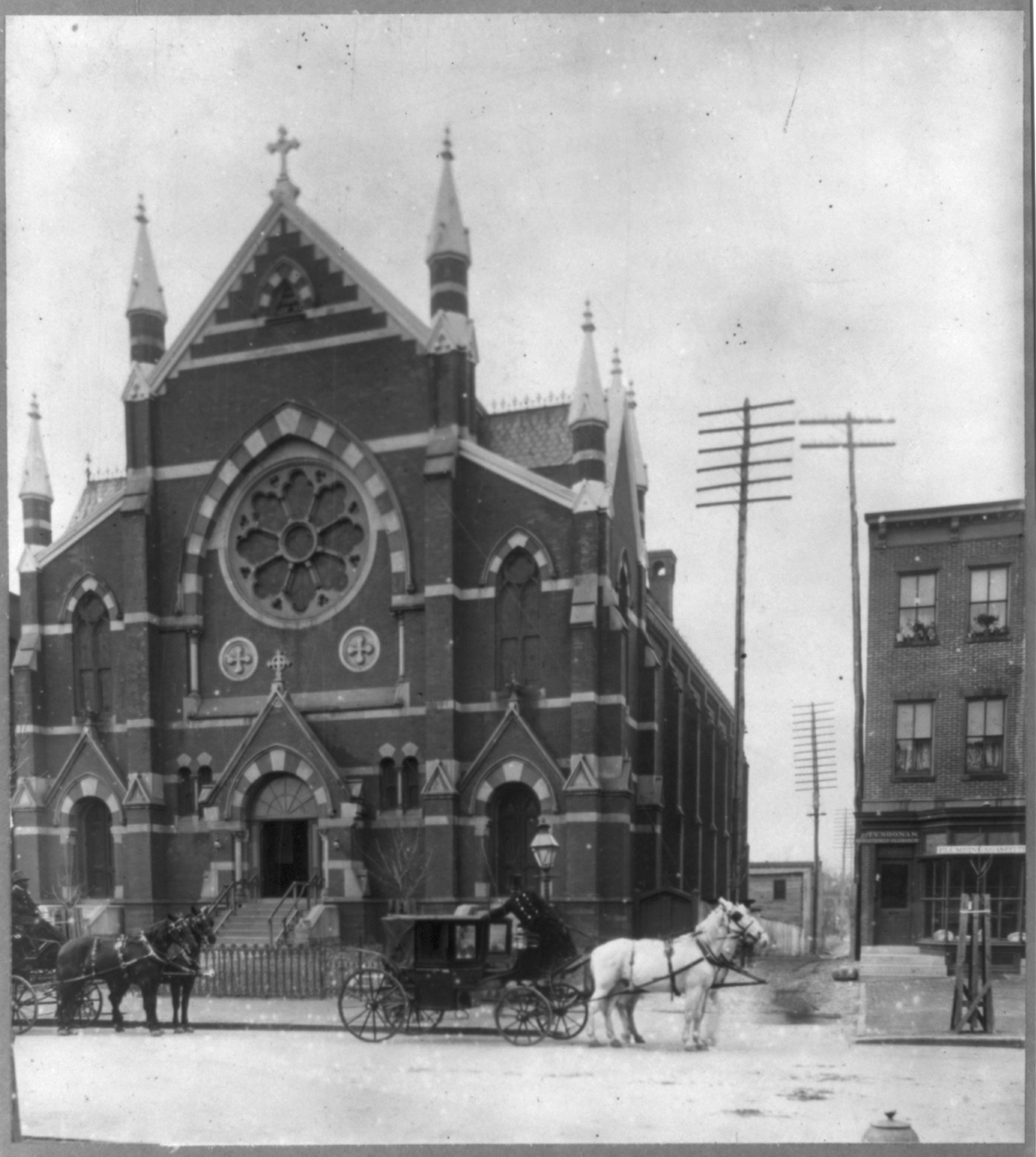
St. Augustine's Church in Washington, D.C., c. 1899. Here Ireland gave his 1890 sermon on racial equality.

Ireland called for racial equality at a time in the U.S. when the concept was considered extreme. On May 5, 1890, he gave a sermon at St. Augustine's Church, in Washington, D.C., the center of an African-American parish, to a congregation that included several public officials, Congressmen including the full Minnesota delegation, U.S. Treasury Secretary William Windom, and Blanche Bruce, the second black U.S. Senator. Ireland's sermon on racial justice concluded with the statement, "The color line must go; the line will be drawn at personal merit." It was reported that "the bold and outspoken stand of the Archbishop on this occasion created somewhat of a sensation throughout America."

=== Support for Catholic immigrants ===
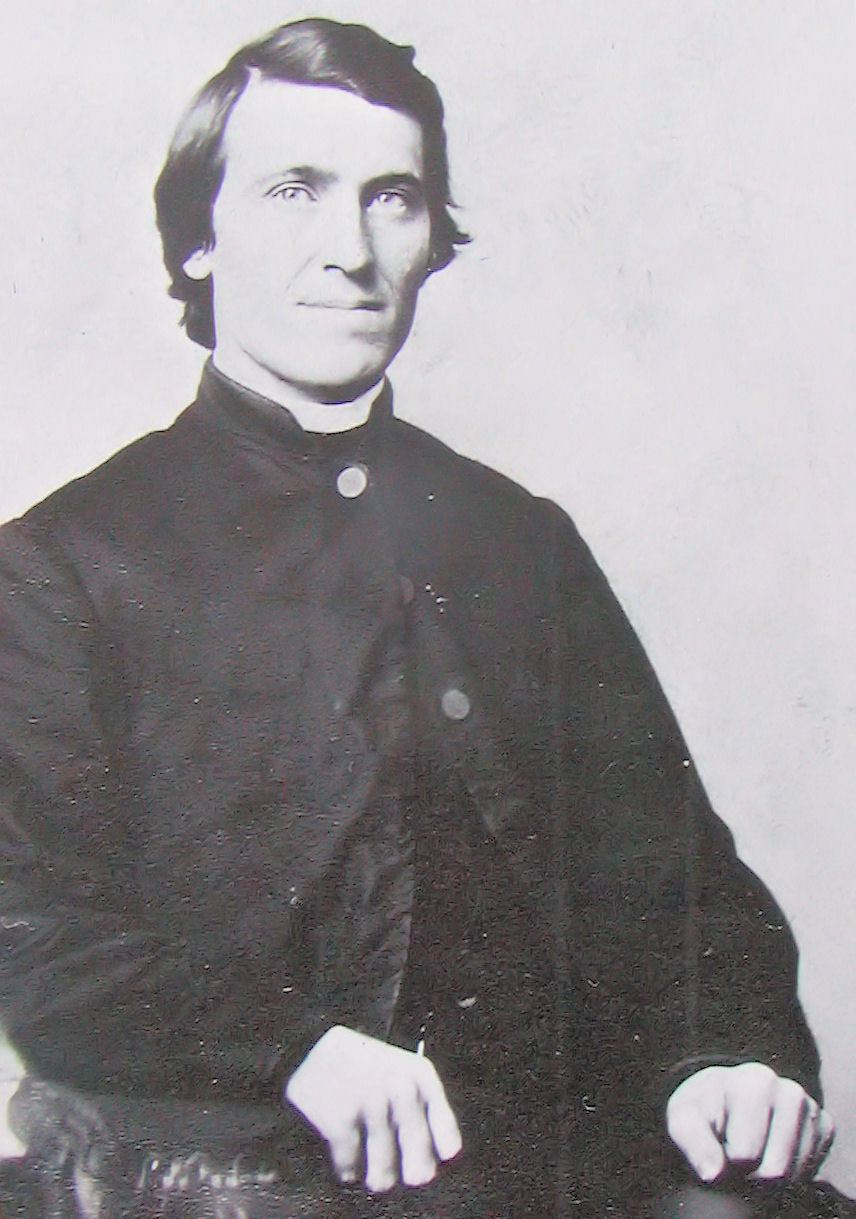
Ireland as a young man

Disturbed by reports that Catholic immigrants in eastern cities were suffering from social and economic handicaps, Ireland and Bishop John Lancaster Spalding of the Diocese of Peoria, Illinois, founded the Irish Catholic Colonization Association. This organization bought land in rural areas to the west and south and helped resettle Irish Catholics from the urban slums. Ireland helped establish many Irish Catholic colonies in Minnesota. The land had been cleared of its native Sioux following the Dakota War of 1862. He served as director of the National Colonization Association. From 1876 to 1881 Ireland organized and directed the most successful rural colonization program ever sponsored by the Catholic Church in the U.S. Working with the western railroads and with the Minnesota state government, he brought more than 4,000 Catholic families from the slums of eastern urban areas and settled them on more than 400,000 acres (1,600 km^{2}) of farmland in rural Minnesota.

His partner in Ireland was John Sweetman, a wealthy brewer who helped set up the Irish-American Colonisation Company there.

In 1880, Ireland assisted several hundred people from Connemara in Ireland to emigrate to Minnesota. They arrived at the wrong time of the year and had to be assisted by local Freemasons, an organisation that the Catholic Church condemns on many points. In the public debate that followed, the immigrants, being Connaught Irish monoglot speakers, could not voice their opinions of Bishop Ireland's criticism of their acceptance of the Masons' support during a harsh winter. De Graff and Clontarf in Swift County, Adrian in Nobles County, Avoca, Iona and Fulda in Murray County, Graceville in Big Stone County and Ghent in Lyon County were all colonies established by Ireland.

Charlotte Grace O'Brien, philanthropist and activist for the protection of female emigrants, found that often the illiterate young women were being tricked into prostitution through spurious offers of employment. She proposed an information bureau at Castle Garden, the disembarkation point for immigrants arriving in New York; a temporary shelter to provide accommodation for immigrants, and a chapel, all to Archbishop Ireland, who she believed of all the American hierarchy would be most sympathetic. Ireland agreed to raise the matter at the May 1883 meeting of the Irish Catholic Association which endorsed the plan and voted to establish an information bureau at Castle Garden. The Irish Catholic Colonization Association was also instrumental in the establishment of the Mission of Our Lady of the Rosary for the Protection of Irish Immigrant Girls.

=== Education ===
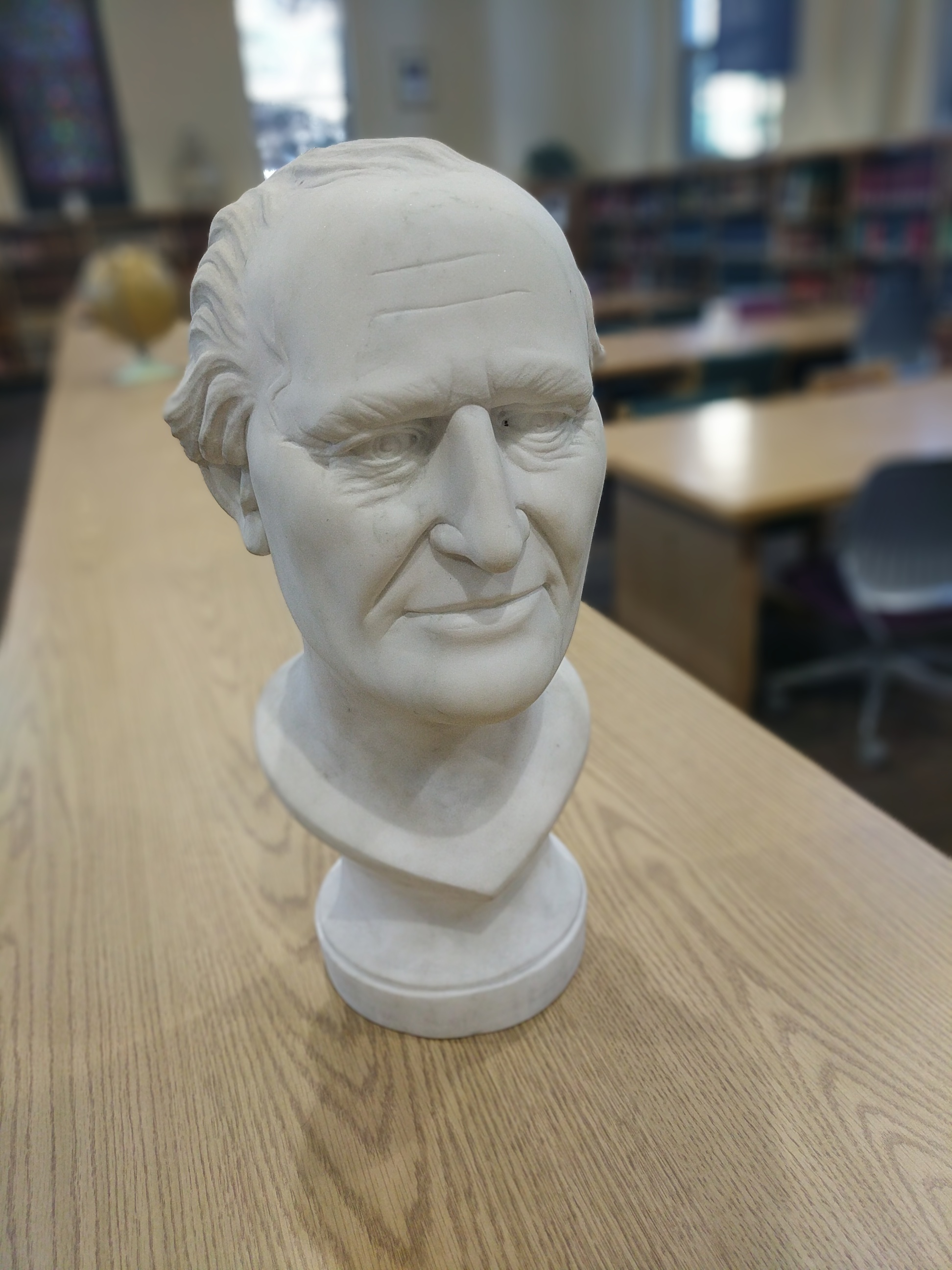
A bust of Archbishop John Ireland in the Ireland Memorial Library at the University of St. Thomas in St. Paul, Minnesota

Ireland advocated state support and inspection of Catholic schools. After several parochial schools were in danger of closing, Ireland sold them to the respective city's board of education. The schools continued to operate with nuns and priests teaching, but no religious teaching was allowed. This plan, the Faribault–Stillwater plan, or Poughkeepsie plan, created enough controversy that Ireland was forced to travel to Rome to defend it to the papal authorities, which he succeeded in doing. He also supported the English only movement, which he sought to enforce within American Catholic churches and parochial schools. The continued use of heritage languages was not uncommon at the time because of the recent large influx of immigrants to the U.S. from European countries. Ireland influenced American society by actively demanding the immediate adoption of the English language by German-Americans and other recent immigrants. He is the author of The Church and Modern Society (1897).

According his biographers Fr. Vincent A. Yzermans and Franz Xaver Wetzel, there is a great historical importance to the well documented clashes between John Joseph Frederick Otto Zardetti while Bishop of St. Cloud, with Archbishop John Ireland and his supporters within the American hierarchy. These clashes were both over Zardetti's hostility to Archbishop Ireland's Modernist theology and Zardetti's belief that American patriotism was compatible with continued teaching and nurturing among immigrant families of the German language and other heritage languages like it. Zardetti later played a major role, as an official of the Roman Curia, in pushing for the Apostolic letter Testem Benevolentiae, which was signed by Pope Leo XIII on 22 January 1899. As a reward, Zardetti was promoted to assistant to the papal throne on 14 February 1899. In commenting on Zardetti's role in the letter, Fr. Yzermans has commented, "In this arena he might well have had seen his greatest impact on American Catholicism in the first half of the twentieth century in the United States."

=== Relations with Eastern Catholics ===
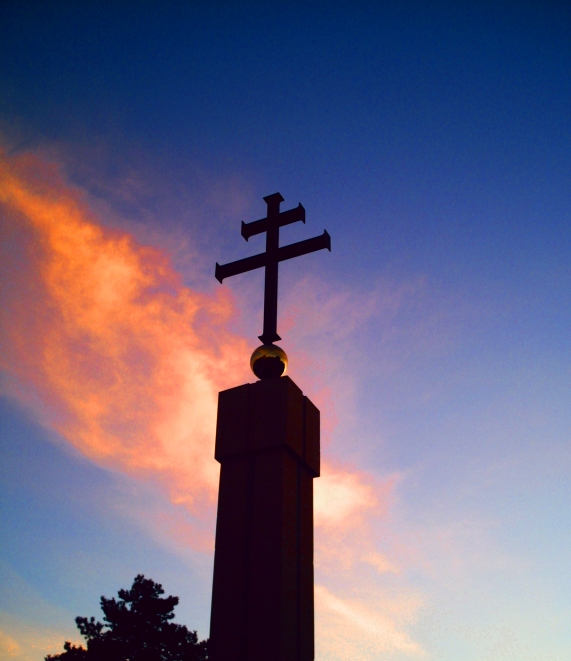
Saint Paul Seminary's Metropolitan Cross

In 1891, Ireland refused to accept the clerical credentials of Byzantine Rite, Ruthenian Catholic priest Alexis Toth, despite Toth's being a widower. Ireland then forbade Toth to minister to his own parishioners. Ireland was also involved in efforts to prevent all "married (or, it seems, even widowed) priests from coming into" the United States. Forced into an impasse, Toth went on to lead thousands of Ruthenian Catholics out of Catholicism into what would eventually become the Orthodox Church in America. Because of this, Archbishop Ireland is sometimes referred to, ironically, as "The Father of the Orthodox Church in America". Marvin R. O'Connell, author of a biography of Ireland, summarizes the situation by stating that "if Ireland's advocacy of the blacks displayed him at his best, his belligerence toward the Uniates showed him at his bull-headed worst."

Pope Leo XIII condemned such behavior and decreed in the 1894 papal encyclical Orientalium dignitas that if a Latin-rite priest attempts to liturgically convert an Eastern-rite faithful, he incurs suspension a divinis as well as dismissal and exclusion from his office. Although the bull did not mention the case of Archbishop of Saint Paul (since its stated scope was primarily the missions in the territories of the then Ottoman Empire), it explicitly condemned behaviors such as those of the archbishop, who, moreover, was not alone in North America.

The Holy See in 1907 sought to take countermeasures by appointing a Greek- Catholic bishop, Soter Ortynsky, for their communities in America, and resolve the issue with the apostolic letter Ea Semper.

== Establishments ==
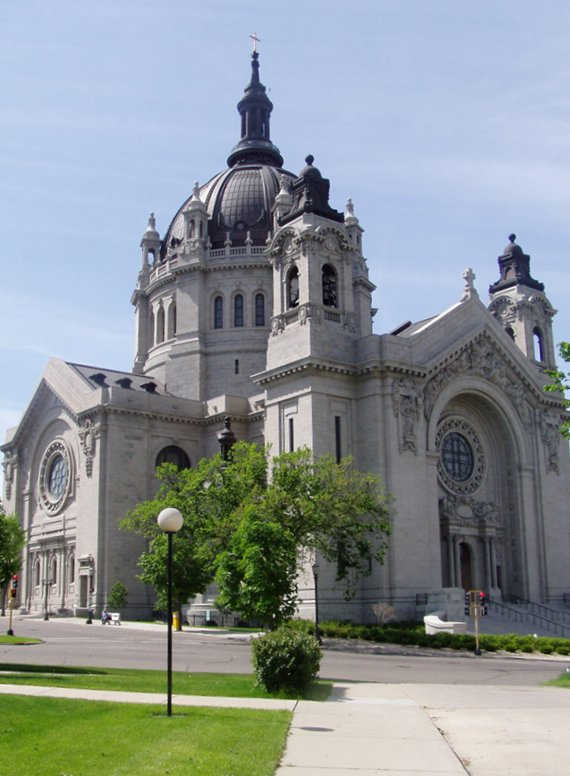
Cathedral of Saint Paul, of the Archdiocese of Saint Paul and Minneapolis

At the Third Plenary Council of Baltimore, the establishment of a Catholic university was decided. In 1885, Ireland was appointed to a committee, along with, Bishop John Lancaster Spalding, Cardinal James Gibbons and then bishop John Joseph Keane dedicated to developing and establishing The Catholic University of America in Washington, D.C. Ireland retained an active interest in the university for the rest of his life.

He founded Saint Thomas Aquinas Seminary, progenitor of four institutions: University of Saint Thomas (Minnesota), the Saint Paul Seminary School of Divinity, Nazareth Hall Preparatory Seminary, and Saint Thomas Academy. The Saint Paul Seminary was established with the help of Methodist James J. Hill, whose wife, Mary Mehegan, was a devout Catholic. Both institutions are located on the bluffs overlooking the Mississippi River. DeLaSalle High School located on Nicollet Island in Minneapolis was opened in October 1900 through a gift of $25,000 from Ireland. Fourteen years later Ireland purchased an adjacent property for the expanding Christian Brothers school.

In 1904, Ireland secured the land for the building of the current Cathedral of Saint Paul located atop Summit Hill, the highest point in downtown Saint Paul. At the same time, on Christmas Day 1903, he also commissioned the construction of the almost equally large Church of Saint Mary, for the Immaculate Conception parish in the neighboring city of Minneapolis. It became the Pro-Cathedral of Minneapolis and later became the Basilica of Saint Mary, the first basilica in the United States in 1926. Both were designed and built under the direction of the French architect Emmanuel Louis Masqueray.

John Ireland Boulevard, a Saint Paul street that runs from the Cathedral of Saint Paul northeast to the Minnesota State Capitol, is named in his honor. It was so named in 1961 at the encouragement of the Ancient Order of Hibernians.

Catholic Church titles
Preceded by Thomas Grace	Bishop of St. Paul; 1884–1888	Succeeded by See below
Preceded by New archiepiscopate	Archbishop of St. Paul; 1888–1918	Succeeded by Austin Dowling
