= Thomas Grace (bishop of Saint Paul) =

American Catholic bishop

The Most Reverend Thomas Langdon Grace OP
- Bishop of Saint Paul
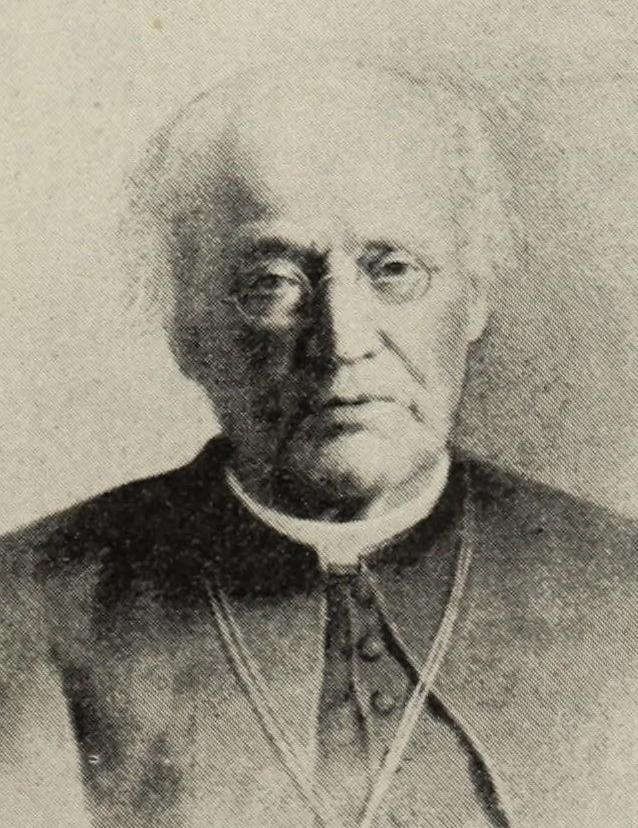
- Church: Catholic Church
- Diocese: Saint Paul
- Appointed: January 21, 1859
- Retired: July 31, 1884
- Predecessor: Joseph Crétin
- Successor: John Ireland
- Other post: Titular Archbishop of Siunia (1889–1897)
- Previous post: Titular Bishop of Mennith (1884–1889)

Orders
- Ordination: December 21, 1839 by Costantino Patrizi Naro
- Consecration: July 24, 1859 by Peter Richard Kenrick

Personal details
- Born: November 16, 1814 Charleston, South Carolina, U.S.
- Died: February 22, 1897 (aged 82) Saint Paul, Minnesota, U.S.

Thomas Langdon Grace OP (November 14, 1814 – February 22, 1897) was an American Catholic prelate who served as the second Bishop of Saint Paul from 1859 to 1884.

== Early life and education ==
Thomas Langdon Grace was born on November 16, 1814, in Charleston, South Carolina. He was the eldest child of Pierce and Margaret Grace, who were natives of County Kilkenny, Ireland. His father was a teacher who also served in the United States Army during the War of 1812. His uncle, Brother Barnaby, was one of the Trappist monks (including James Myles O'Gorman) who founded New Melleray Abbey at Dubuque, Iowa, in 1849.

From South Carolina, the Grace family moved to Augusta, Georgia, then to Pennsylvania, and finally settled in Cincinnati, Ohio. At Cincinnati, Grace enrolled at the newly opened St. Francis Xavier Seminary in 1829. The seminary had been founded by Edward Fenwick, the first Bishop of Cincinnati and a member of the Dominican Order. The following year, in 1830, Grace entered the Dominican Order himself at St. Rose Priory in Springfield, Kentucky. He received the Dominican habit on June 10, 1830, and made his religious profession on June 12, 1831.

In June 1838, Grace was sent to continue his studies in Rome at Collegium Divi Thomae, then attached to the Dominican church of Santa Maria sopra Minerva.

== Priesthood ==
While in Rome, Grace was ordained a priest on December 21, 1839, by Cardinal Costantino Patrizi Naro, the prefect of the Congregation of Bishops and Regulars. Falling ill, he was then sent to complete his studies at San Domenico in Perugia, where he obtained the degree of Lector of Sacred Theology in 1844.

Upon his return to the United States, Grace served as a professor and sub-prior at St. Rose Priory. In 1846, he was appointed an assistant pastor, under fellow Dominican Joseph Sadoc Alemany, at St. Peter's Church in Memphis, Tennessee. St. Peter's was the first and, at the time, only Catholic church in West Tennessee. He became pastor in 1849.

As pastor of St. Peter's, Grace began the construction of the present church in 1852 and it was dedicated by Bishop Richard Pius Miles in 1858. In addition to his pastoral duties, he was named vicar general of the western part of the Diocese of Nashville in 1857.

== Bishop of Saint Paul ==
Following the death of Bishop Joseph Crétin of the Diocese of Saint Paul in February 1857, Father J. A. M. Pelamourgues was appointed to succeed him but he refused to accept. In September 1858, the bishops of the Archdiocese of St. Louis sent to Rome a terna, or list of three candidates, that included Grace, Joseph Melcher, and Lucien Galtier.

The Congregation for the Propagation of the Faith (which then oversaw the affairs of the Church in the United States) nominated Grace on December 16, 1858, and Pope Pius IX confirmed his appointment on January 21, 1859. When the papal bull reached Grace, he returned it in an attempt to refuse the appointment but Rome commanded him to accept in June. Grace received his episcopal consecration on July 24, 1859, from Archbishop Peter Richard Kenrick, with Bishops Richard Miles and James Duggan serving as co-consecrators. He was the first native of South Carolina to serve as a Catholic priest or bishop.

Grace was installed as the second Bishop of Saint Paul on July 29, 1859. At the beginning of his tenure, the diocese contained 27 priests and 31 churches to serve a Catholic population of 50,000. By the end of his tenure, there were 147 priests, 195 churches, and 130,000 Catholics. The diocese initially covered the entire state of Minnesota and the Dakota Territory; in 1875, the Vicariate Apostolic of Northern Minnesota was erected from the northern part of the state and Dakota. In 1876, Grace welcomed Mother Mary Alfred Moes who founded the Sisters of the Congregation of Our Lady of Lourdes of the Third Order Regular of Saint Francis who established Saint Marys Hospital in Rochester which later became Mayo Clinic Hospital.

Despite being a Southerner by birth, Grace supported the Union during the American Civil War, telling one newspaper, "I have always encouraged my people to enlist in the defense of their country...and have always told them that they have enjoyed the protection of the government and ought to be ready at all times to defend it." Grace did not attend the First Vatican Council "on account of the pressing cares of the diocese," and sent Father John Ireland to represent him as far as possible.

== Later life and death ==
Shortly after the 25th anniversary of his episcopal consecration, Grace retired as Bishop of St. Paul on August 12, 1884. At that time, Pope Leo XIII gave him the honorary position of titular bishop of Mennith. On September 24, 1889, Leo XIII raised him to the rank of an archbishop, appointing him to the titular see of Siunia.

Grace died at St. Joseph's Hospital in Saint Paul on February 22, 1897, at the age of 82. His Requiem Mass was celebrated on the following February 25 by Archbishop John Ireland at the Cathedral of Saint Paul, with Bishop John Shanley delivering the eulogy. He was buried in Calvary Cemetery.

== Legacy ==
Totino-Grace High School, a Roman Catholic high school in Fridley, Minnesota, bears his name.

The city of Graceville, Minnesota was named in his honor.

== Sources ==
- Reardon, James Michael (1952). The Catholic Church in the Diocese of St. Paul. North Central Publishing Company.

Catholic Church titles
Preceded by Joseph Crétin	Bishop of St. Paul; 1859–1884	Succeeded by John Ireland
