= French language in Minnesota =

The French language has been spoken in Minnesota since the 17th century, being the first European language to be brought to the area.

== History ==
The history of the French language in Minnesota is closely linked with that of Canadian settlers, such as explorer Louis Hennepin and trapper Pierre Parrant, who contributed very early on to its use in the area.

As early as the mid-17th century, evidence shows the presence of French expeditions, settlements and villages in the region, in particular thanks to Frenchmen Pierre-Esprit Radisson and Médard des Groseilliers, who likely reached Minnesota in 1654 after exploring Wisconsin.

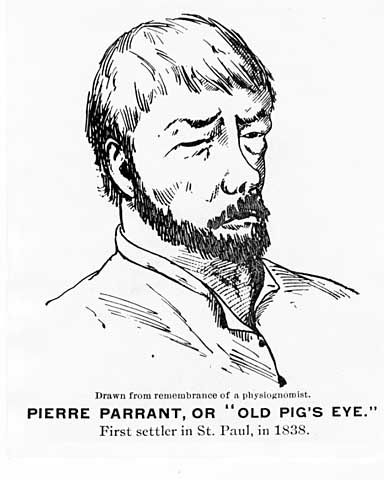
Pierre "Pig's Eye" Parrant, first settler in Saint Paul, Minnesota

A few years later, explorer Cavelier de la Salle charted the Mississippi, ending his voyage in the neighboring state of North Dakota. He gave this region the nickname of L'étoile du Nord (Star of the North), which eventually became the motto of the State of Minnesota.

Former state seal

The exploration of the northern territories and areas surrounding the Great Lake, including Minnesota, was encouraged by Frontenac, the Governor of New France.

In the early days of Minnesota's settlement, many of its early European inhabitants were of Canadian origin, including Pierre Parrant, a trapper and fur trader born in Sault Ste. Marie (Michigan) in 1777.

The Red River Métis community also played an important part in the use of French in Minnesota.

Since 1858, when the State of Minnesota was established, the Great Seal of the State of Minnesota bears Cavelier de la Salle's French motto "L'étoile du Nord".

== Arts ==
A number of architectural, pictorial and musical works in Minnesota have been and still are made by French-speaking residents and visitors. For example, the St. Louis Parish was established in 1868 by French architect Emmanuel Louis Masqueray.

== Famous francophones in Minnesota ==
Pierre Bonga, a former slave who became a prominent fur trader in Minnesota, 1802–1831. His father, Jean Bonga, had been born in the West Indies and was brought to Michilimackinac in the Great Lakes by Captain Daniel Robertson who was the post's first British commander following the fall of the French in North America in 1763.

George Bonga, Pierre Bonga's son, also a prominent fur trader 1820–1839, who from the 1840s onward served as an interpreter for treaties made between the United States and the Ojibwe, and for Indian agency at Leech Lake.

Pierre Bottineau, a surveyor who in the mid-1800s established several communities across Minnesota.

Irma LeVasseur, the first French-Canadian woman to become a doctor, was trained in French in Minnesota before she went on to practice in Québec and Europe. She studied medicine at the University of Saint Paul, Minnesota, as Québec universities did not allow women to attend. She practiced in the United States from 1900 to 1903 until she was authorized to do so in her home country. In 1907, with the help of Justine Lacoste-Beaubien and other doctors she recruited, including Séverin Lachapelle, LeVasseur founded the hôpital Sainte-Justine in Montréal.

French architect Emmanuel Louis Masqueray settled in Minnesota in 1905 and stayed until his death. He designed many mansions and houses throughout Minnesota and about two dozen parish churches for Catholic and Protestant congregations in the upper Midwest, including:

- Cathedral of Saint Paul (Cathédrale Saint Paul), St. Paul (1904)
- Basilica of Saint Mary (Basilique Sainte Marie), Minneapolis (1908)
- Incarnation Catholic Church (église de l'Incarnation), Minneapolis (1909)
- St. Paul's Episcopal Church on the Hill, St. Paul (1912)
- Bethlehem Lutheran Church, 655 Forest Street, St. Paul
- University Hall at the University of St. Thomas, St. Paul
- Chapel of St. Thomas Aquinas (chapelle Saint Thomas d'Aquin), 121 Cleveland Ave., St. Paul (1918)
- The Church of the Holy Redeemer, Marshall, Minnesota (1915)
- Church of St. Peter (église Saint Pierre), St. Peter, Minnesota (1911) The Church was destroyed by a tornado that struck St. Peter on March 29, 1998, a new church-school complex was built at a new location west of the city at 1801 West Broadway. The St. Peter Community Center and Public Library occupy the site of the former church.
- Church of St. Edward (église Saint Édouard), Minneota, Minnesota
- Church of St. Francis (église Saint François), Benson, Minnesota
- Sacred Heart Church (église du Sacré Cœur), Murdock, Minnesota

In 1906, Masqueray founded his atelier in St Paul, which continued his Beaux Arts method of architectural training. Among the students who trained there, the best known certainly is Edwin Lundie (1886–1972). Other architects associated with Masqueray in St. Paul were Fred Slifer and Frank Abrahamson.

== In the 20th century ==
The use of French in Minnesota plummeted after American States launched campaigns to anglicize their population throughout the 20th century. During a certain period, teaching and speaking French in schools was forbidden. According to the 1980 United States census, only 303 599 "persons of French origin", 10,026 "other French speakers" and 775 people "born in France" remained in Minnesota, which represents about 8.2% of the total state population.

=== Places ===
The town of Gentilly was of great importance for French-Canadian immigration in Minnesota. Its Catholic church, dedicated to St. Peter, is now listed as a historical building. Unlike most churches in the area, which are made of wood, this church was built with bricks. It was erected in 1914 as the "church of the French" for the region, most of which were immigrants from Joliette, Quebec, in the late 19th century. Inside the church, the stations of the Way of the Cross and the stained-glass pictures bear French-only inscriptions.

The communities of Terrebonne, Huot, Roseau and St. Hilaire are also places of historical significance for French-Canadian immigration.

Throughout Minnesota and the surrounding states, numerous place names still bear names of French origins, including: Mille Lacs County, French River, French Lake, Roseau County, St. Louis County, Lac qui Parle County, Hennepin County, Le Sueur County, Lyon County, Voyageurs National Park, Lake Vermilion, Grand Portage, Lake Marquette, Fond du Lac River, Bois Blanc Lake, Lac Vieux Desert lake, Lac Plè (or Pelé) lake, Belle Plaine, Belle Taine, Belle Rose Island, La Croix Lake, La Salle Lake, La Salle River, LaBelle Lake, Le Homme Dieu Lake, Nord lake, La Grand, La Crosse, Audubon, Bain, Beauford, Beaulieu, Bejou, Bellaire, Belgian Township, Belle Prairie Township, Bellevue Township, Duluth, Dumont, Duquette, Frenchy Corner, Frontenac, Grand Marais, Lafayette, La Fontaine, La Cressent, Lagarde, Le Roy, Le Center, Marcoux, St. Hilaire, Chapeau Lake, Faribault, Lake of the Woods (lac des Bois), Nicollet County, Gervais Lake, etc.

Native American reservations in Minnesota have or had French names, reminiscent of earlier fur trade days with Montréal-based Northwest Company. They include Bois Forte, Fond du Lac, Grand Portage, Lac Rouge (now Red Lake), Lac Sangsue (now Leech Lake), and Mille Lacs.

=== Today ===
In present-day Minnesota, French is maintained alive through bilingual education options and French-language classes in universities and schools. It is also promoted by local associations and groups such as AFRAN (Association des Français du Nord), who support events such as the Chautauqua Festival in Huot, an event celebrating the French heritage of local communities.

In 2012, a Franco-fête Festival was held in Minneapolis. Similar events take place every year throughout the state of Minnesota.

Since Minnesota shares a border with French-speaking areas of Canada, French exchanges remain common. In 2004, an estimated 35% of Minnesota's production was being exported to Francophone countries (Canada, France, Belgium and Switzerland).

== International relations ==
Two French-language consulates are active in Minnesota: the Belgian Consulate in Saint Paul (also Dutch Speaking) and the Canadian Consulate in Minneapolis.

An Alliance Française and an annex of the Association américaine des professeurs de français (AATF) are also present in Minneapolis.

== See also ==
- Francophonie
- French Americans
- French language in the United States
- Influence of French on English
- Louis Riel
- Métis in the United States
- Missouri French
- Muskrat French
- North American fur trade
- Pays d'en Haut
