= Gervais (name) =

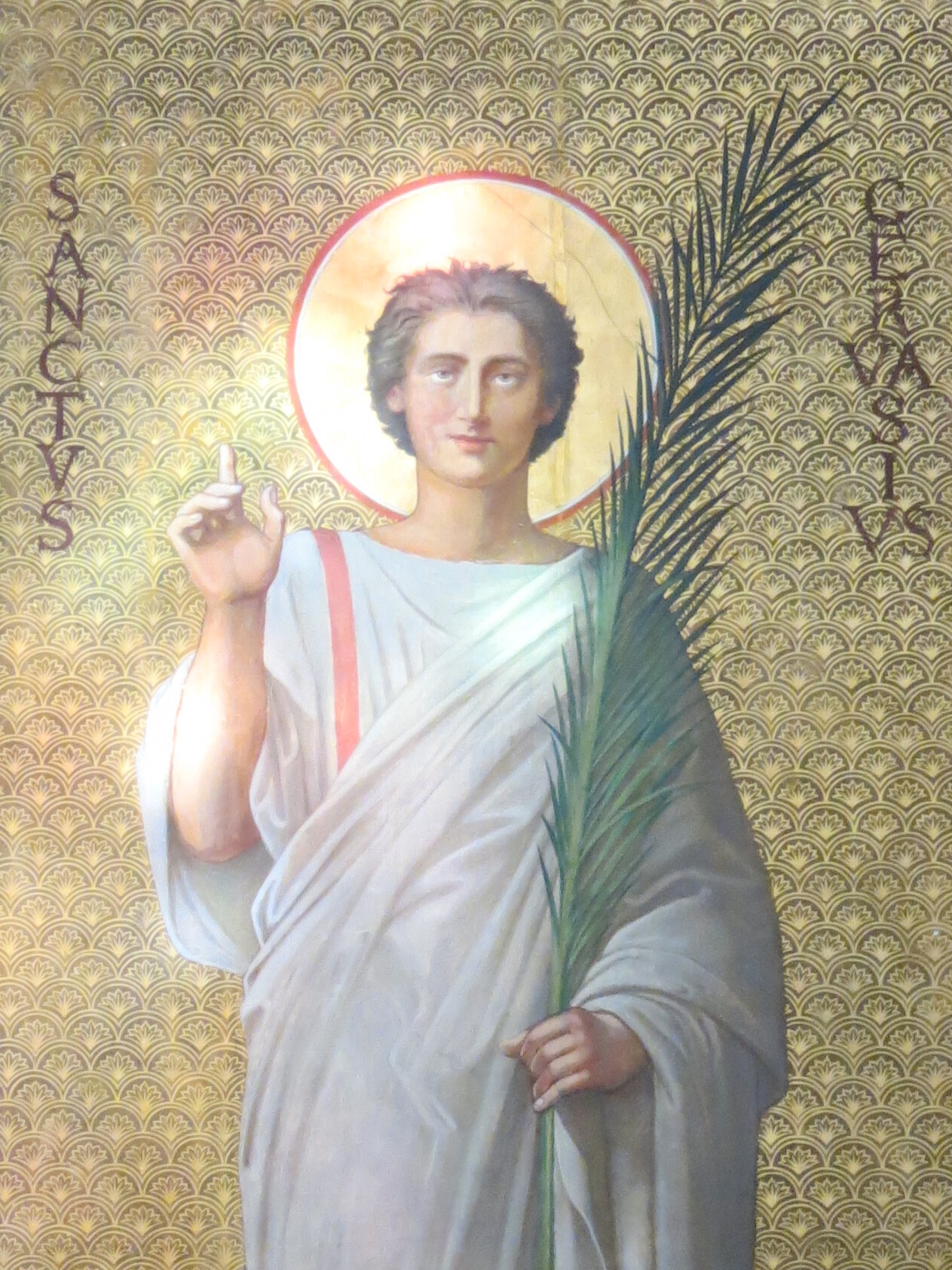
- Painting of Saint Gervasius in the Church of Saint Gervasius of Rouen
- Languages: French, English

Origin
- Language: Old French
- Origin: Gervase
- Derivation: Jarvis; Gervasius

Other names
- Alternative spelling: Gervaise

Gervais (/dʒərˈveɪz/; French pronunciation: [ʒeʀˈve]), or Gervaise, is an English and French name of Old French origin. The name in English was inherited via Norman, and is ultimately derived from the Proto-Germanic Gervas, which is composed of the elements gaiʀ ("spear") and an unknown second element, possibly a borrowing from the Celtic -wass ("servant, vassal"). The name Jarvis is derived from Gervais(e), and it is latinized as Gervasius. The popularity of the name owes to Saint Gervasius (French: Saint Gervais), martyred alongside Protasius in Milan. Notable people with the name include:

== Given name ==
=== Middle Ages ===
- Gervase Alard (1270–1340), Admiral of the Cinque Ports Fleet and Admiral of the Western Fleet of the English Navy
- Gervase of Bazoches (died 1108), crusader and Prince of Galilee
- Gervase of Besançon (died 685), saint and a bishop of Besançon
- Gervase of Blois (died c. 1157), Abbot of Westminster in England
- Gervase of Canterbury (c. 1141–c. 1210), English chronicler
- Gervais de Château-du-Loir (1007–1067), French nobleman and bishop
- Gervase de Cornhill (c. 1110–c. 1183), Anglo-Norman royal official and sheriff
- Gervase of Ebstorf (fl. 1234-1240), author of the Ebstorf Map created c. 1234; possibly the same man as Gervase of Tilbury
- Gervase of Melkley (born c. 1185, fl. 1200–1219), French scholar and poet
- Gervais, Count of Rethel (fl. 11th century), French archbishop and nobleman
- Gervase of Tilbury (c. 1150–c. 1228), English chronicler

=== Early modern era ===
- Gervase Babington (1549/1550–1610), Bishop of Llandaff, Bishop of Exeter and Bishop of Worcester
- Gervais Baudouin (c. 1645–1700), French physician
- Sir Gervase Elwes, 1st Baronet (1628–1706), English Member of Parliament
- Gervase Elwes, junior (c. 1657–c. 1687), English Member of Parliament, son of the 1st baronet
- Gervase Holles (1607–1675), English lawyer, antiquarian and Member of Parliament
- Gervais de La Rue (1751–1835), French historian
- Gervase Markham (1568?–1637), English poet and writer
- Gervais Parker (1695–1750), British Army officer

=== Late modern era ===
- Gervais Batota (born 1982), Congolese footballer
- Gervase Beckett (1866–1937), British banker and Member of Parliament
- Gervaise Cooke (1911–1976), British Royal Navy officer and Naval Secretary
- Gervais Djondo (born c. 1934), Togolese entrepreneur
- Gervase Elwes (1866–1921), English tenor
- Gervais Emmanuel Ducasse (1903–1988), Haitian painter
- Gervais Gindre (born 1927), French cross country skier and Olympic competitor
- Gervais Henrie (born 1972), Seychellois politician
- Gervas Huxley (1894–1971), British soldier and author
- Gervase Jackson-Stops (1947–1995), English architectural historian
- Gervais Martel (born 1954), French businessman and football club president
- Gervais Nolan (1796–1857), Canadian fur trapper
- Gervase Peterson (born 1969), American contestant on the show Survivor
- Gervase de Peyer (born 1926), English clarinettist and conductor
- Gervase Phinn (born 1946), English author and educator
- Gervas Pierrepont, 6th Earl Manvers (1881–1955), British nobleman, soldier and landowner
- Gervais Randrianarisoa (born 1984), Malagasy footballer
- Gervais Rentoul (1884–1946), British politician
- Gervas Rozario (born 1951), Bangladeshi bishop
- Gervais Rufyikiri (born 1965), Burundian politician
- G. D. Spradlin Gervase Duan Spradlin (1920–2011), American actor
- Gervais Tennyson d'Eyncourt (1902–1971), English baronet
- Gervais Waye-Hive (born 1988), Seychellois soccer player
- Gervinho (born 1987), Ivorian footballer Gervais Yao Kouassi

== Surname ==
- Aaron Gervais (born 1980), Canadian composer
- Aurèle Gervais (1933–2021), Canadian politician
- Bruno Gervais (born 1984), Canadian ice hockey player
- Cedric Gervais (born 1979), French DJ and house music producer
- Charles-Hubert Gervais (1671–1744), French composer
- Claude Gervaise (1525–1583), French composer, editor and arranger
- Eugène Gervais (1852-1940), French Architect
- Drago Gervais (1904–1957), Croatian poet
- François Armand Gervaise (1660–1761), French Discalced Carmelite and historian
- Gaétan Gervais (1944–2018), Canadian writer, historian and flag designer
- Isaac Gervaise (c. 1680–1739), English merchant and economist
- Jean-Loup Gervais(1936-) French physicist
- Joseph Gervais (1777–1861), Oregon pioneer
- John Gervais (13th century), Bishop of Winchester
- John Lewis Gervais (1741–1798), South Carolina statesman
- Leslie-Ann Gervais (born 1977), Canadian fencer
- Marc Gervais (1929–2012), Canadian Jesuit and film professor
- Paul Gervais (1816–1879), French palaeontologist and entomologist
- Paul Gervais (painter) (1859–1944), French painter
- Paul Gervais (writer) (born 1946), American novelist and garden-designer
- Paul Mullins Gervais (1925–1997), Liberal party member of the Canadian House of Commons
- Ricky Gervais (born 1961), English comedian and actor
- Sabrina Gervais (born 1990), Canadian flag football player
- Terence White Gervais (1913–1968), English musician and writer
- Tony Gervaise (born 1955), Scottish association football player and coach
- Virginie Gervais (born 1979), French model and porn star

== Fictional characters ==
- Gervase Fen, a detective in novels by Edmund Crispin
- Petit Gervais, a minor character in the novel Les Misérables

== See also ==
- Gervais (disambiguation)
- Gervaise (disambiguation)
- Gervas (disambiguation)
- Gervase (disambiguation)
- Gervasio
