= James Michael Reardon =

Canadian American Catholic priest (1872–1963)

Monsignor James Michael Reardon PA
- Rector of the Basilica of Saint Mary
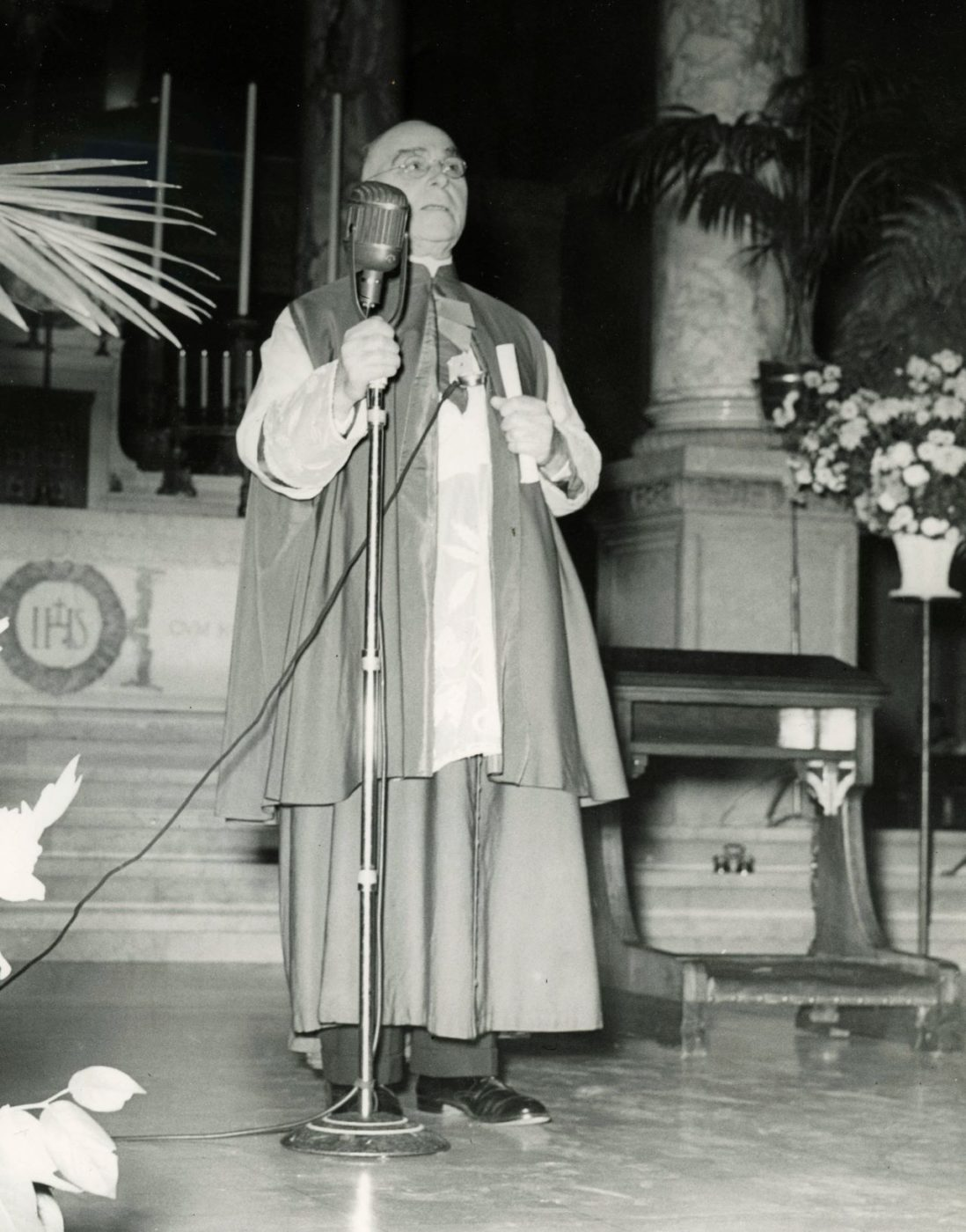
- Reardon in 1950
- Church: Catholic Church
- Archdiocese: Saint Paul and Minneapolis

Orders
- Ordination: June 4, 1898 by John Ireland

Personal details
- Born: August 31, 1872 Charlottetown, Colony of Prince Edward Island
- Died: December 12, 1963 (aged 91) Minneapolis, Minnesota, U.S.
- Buried: Resurrection Cemetery, Mendota Heights, Minnesota
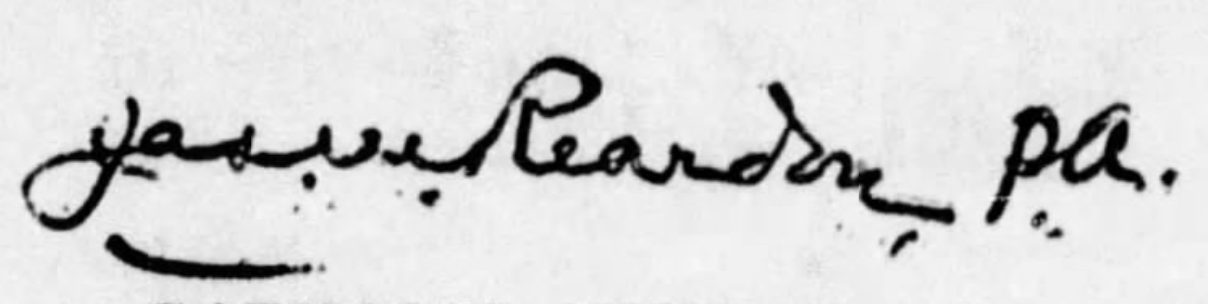
- Signature
- Awards: Order of Leopold II

James Michael Reardon (August 31, 1872 – December 12, 1963) was a Canadian-American Catholic priest and professor of the Archdiocese of Saint Paul. A prominent churchman in the first half of the 20th century, he was rector of the Basilica of Saint Mary from 1921 until his death and wrote the definitive history of the diocese.

== Early life ==
James Michael Reardon was born on August 31, 1872, in Charlottetown, Colony of Prince Edward Island. After receiving his B.A. degree from Laval University in Quebec, he studied for one year at the Grand Seminary. Reardon immigrated to Minnesota in 1895, and began studies at Saint Paul Seminary. He was ordained at the Saint Paul Seminary by Archbishop John Ireland on June 4, 1898.

== Priesthood ==
A teacher by trade, Reardon taught science at the seminary after his ordination until 1910, when he was appointed to St. John the Baptist parish in Excelsior, Minnesota. He was simultaneously appointed as the first editor of The Catholic Bulletin upon its establishment in January 1911. Reardon initially resisted the appointment, stating that he had no training in journalism, but created a paid subscribership of 25,000 by the end of his editorship in 1922. Reardon also served as the president of the Catholic Total Abstinence Society. He was pastor of St. Mary's in Saint Paul from 1916 to 1921.

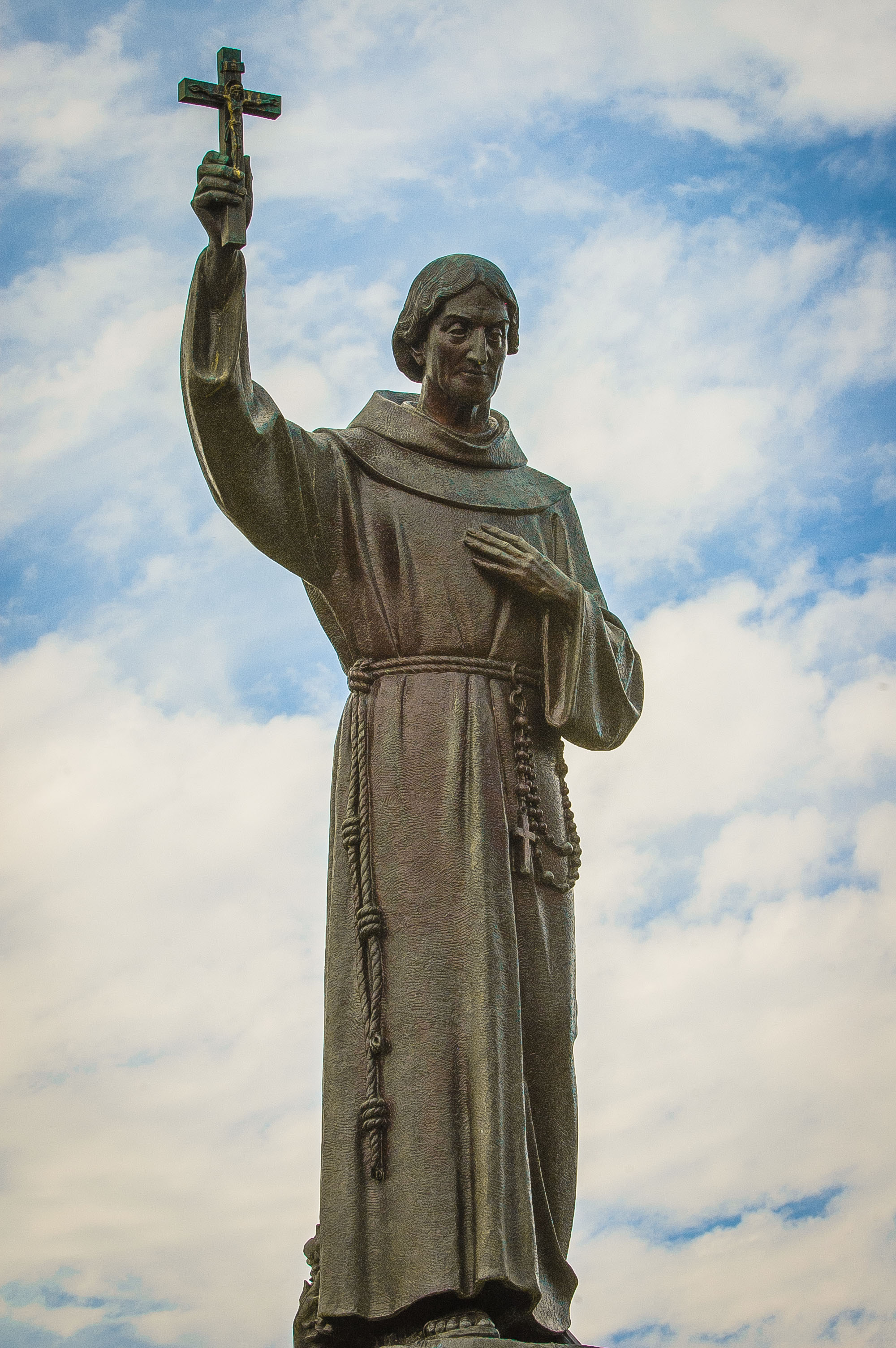
The statue of Father Louis Hennepin that Reardon erected

In 1921, Reardon became the rector of the Procathedral of the Immaculate Conception in Minneapolis. As rector, he carried out the completion of the interior of the as-of-yet unfinished pro-cathedral. On Christmas Day, 1925, Pope Pius XI elevated the church to the status minor basilica, the first in the United States; thereafter, it became known as the Basilica of Saint Mary. Reardon held the job as rector for the rest of his life, a tenure of 42 years. Reardon erected a statue in honor of Belgian priest Louis Hennepin, an early explorer of Minnesota, in front of the basilica. In thanksgiving for this, King Albert I of Belgium decorated Reardon as an Officer of the Order of Leopold II in 1931.

Reardon served as chairman of the executive and general committees of the Ninth National Eucharistic Congress. The congress was held in the Twin Cities from June 23 to 26, 1941, at various locations throughout the Twin Cities, including the state fairgrounds, Saint Paul Union Depot, the Minneapolis Auditorium, the St. Paul Auditorium, the Cathedral of Saint Paul and the Basilica of Saint Mary. After the congress, in recognition for his work in the diocese, he was granted the title of protonotary apostolic.

Archbishop John Gregory Murray suggested that Reardon write a history of the diocese. It took Reardon five years to research for the book, which was published in 1952. Entitled The Catholic Church in the Diocese of Saint Paul, it sold some 13,000 copies. In 1988, Jean Hopfensperger of the Star Tribune said it was "the most comprehensive" history book of the diocese.

== Death and funeral ==
On December 12, 1963, Reardon went to the basilica for his usual afternoon rosary. When his assistant priests did not notice him return for dinner, they went to the church and found him in the front pew, dead from a heart attack. His will stipulated a plain wooden coffin and no sermon at his funeral, which was celebrated December 16 by Archbishop Leo Binz and followed by burial at Resurrection Cemetery in Mendota Heights. He was the last surviving priest to have been ordained by Archbishop John Ireland. He left the majority of his estate to Saint Paul Seminary and Nazareth Hall Preparatory Seminary, including his library. An associate called him "the last of the clerical gentlemen".
