= The Catholic Spirit =

Catholic diocesan newspaper

- The Catholic Spirit print edition on June 9, 2016
- Type: Bi-weekly newspaper
- Owner: Archdiocese of Saint Paul and Minneapolis
- Founder(s): John Ireland, James Michael Reardon
- Publisher: Archbishop Bernard Hebda
- Editor: Joe Ruff
- Staff writers: Rebecca Omastiak, Dave Hrbacek, Barb Umberger
- Founded: 1911; 115 years ago
- Language: English
- Headquarters: St. Paul, Minnesota
- Circulation: 54,000 (as of 2024)
- ISSN: 2694-3751
- OCLC number: 34062019
- Website: thecatholicspirit.com
- Free online archives: (1911–1922) (1990–present)

The Catholic Spirit is the official newspaper of the Archdiocese of Saint Paul and Minneapolis. Founded by John Ireland in 1911 as an 8-page weekly named The Catholic Bulletin and with a subscription base of 2,500, it was renamed to The Catholic Spirit in 1996 and currently circulates to 54,000 households in the Twin Cities area twice per month.

== History ==
=== Background ===
In 1866, a small newspaper called The Northwestern Chronicle began to be published by John Crosby Devereux in Saint Paul, Minnesota. While not originally an official Catholic newspaper, it received the support of Bishop Thomas Grace, who used it to communicate to the clergy. Grace also granted the operation free rent in a building in St. Paul's Catholic block. However, facing financial difficulties a decade after its founding, Devereux sold the Chronicle to coadjutor bishop of Saint Paul John Ireland for $2,000 ($60,469 in 2025). After settling his debts, Devereux netted a total of $1,800 ($54,422 in 2025) from his ten years running the paper. The Chronicle under Bishop Ireland did not recover from its financial difficulties, incurring debts which he covered personally, and in 1900 he sold it to the Catholic Citizen newspaper in Milwaukee.

=== The Catholic Bulletin ===
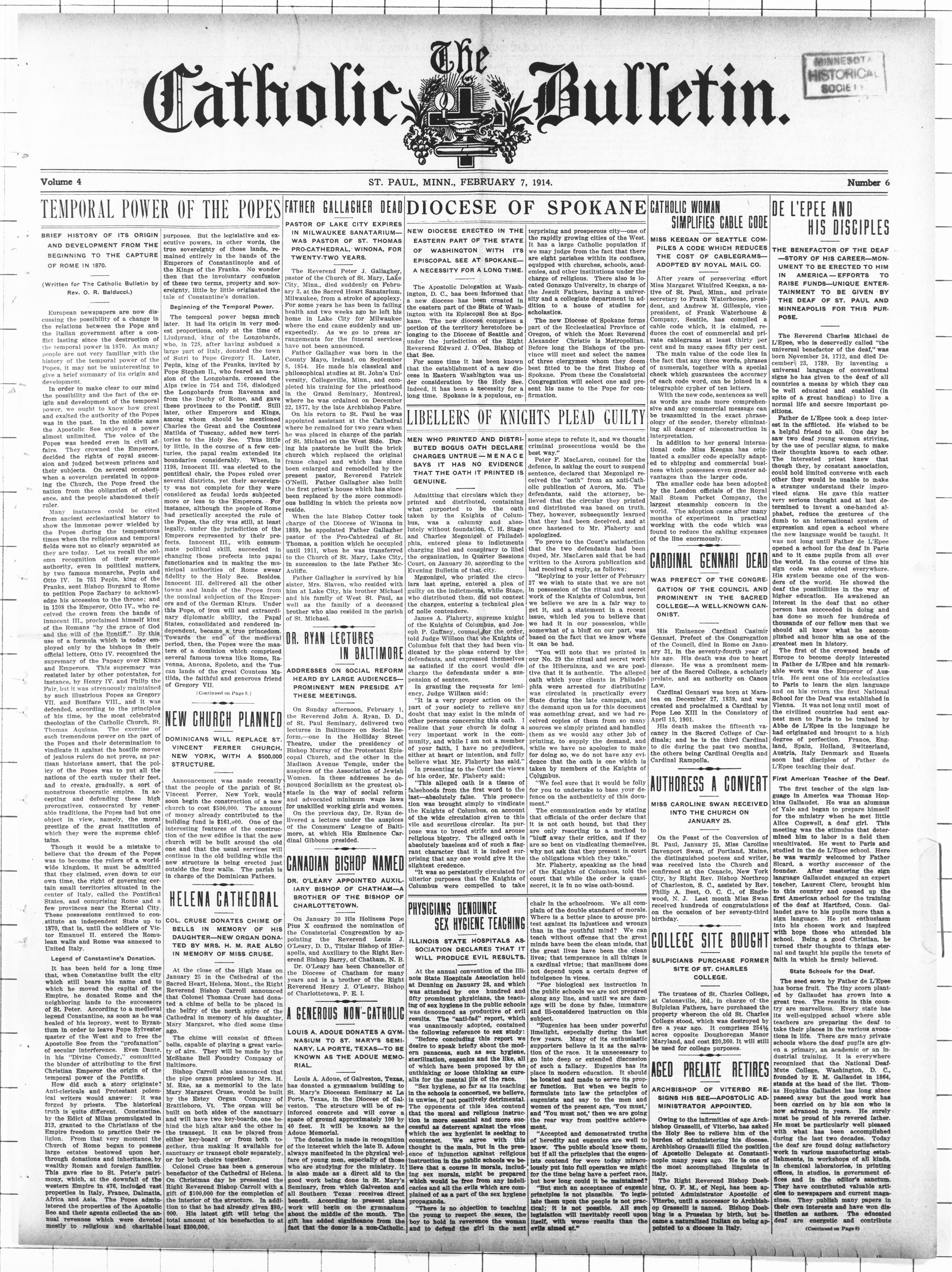
The Catholic Bulletin on February 7, 1914, breaking the news of the erection of the Diocese of Spokane

In 1911, then-Archbishop John Ireland founded The Catholic Bulletin with Father James Reardon as its first editor. Reardon initially resisted the appointment, stating that he had no training in journalism. The first issue was published on January 7, 1911, with a run of 2,500 papers sent to paying subscribers. Archbishop Diomede Falconio, apostolic delegate to the United States, sent a congratulatory letter. The paper served not only as the official paper of the Archdiocese of Saint Paul, but of all the dioceses in the Province of Saint Paul save one.

The 8-page paper was published weekly. Ireland insisted that the paper not be laudatory of his person and that it be non-political and non-controversial; he simply wanted an "interesting, well-written and well-edited Catholic newspaper". Due to Ireland's connections, the Bulletin had scoops on the erection of the Diocese of Spokane and the election of Benedict XV, publishing the stories before any other American newspapers. (Note: It is unclear how the Bulletin scooped the election of Benedict XV given that he was elected on a Thursday, the Bulletin did not publish until Saturday, and other papers had reported it by then. However, the scoop of the erection of the Diocese of Spokane ("Diocese of Spokane". The Catholic Bulletin. February 7, 1914) is well-attested to: "Spokane Center of New Diocese, Catholic Church". Spokane Chronicle. February 11, 1914.) Reardon established a paid subscribership of 25,000 by the time he relinquished the top job at the paper in 1922.

After Reardon was named pastor of the Basilica of Saint Mary in 1922, Father John Volz was appointed as editor. Volz served until 1925, when a layman, Bernard Vaughn, was named editor; he held the job until 1957, when he suffered a heart attack.

In 1957, Bernard Casserly, a reporter for the Minneapolis Star, became the editor. During the turbulent times following the Second Vatican Council, what Casserly chose to cover was often controversial. At one point in the 1960s, a priest cancelled 1,600 of his parishioners' subscriptions over a front-page photo of a nun dancing; in response, Casserly remarked that he considered it important to cover what was going on in the Church. In 1961, the paper had a circulation of 40,000. Casserly retired as editor in 1982. Robert Zyskowski became the editor in 1986.

=== The Catholic Spirit ===
The newspaper underwent a design and name change in 1996 to become The Catholic Spirit. Then-editor Robert Zyskowski took on the role of associate publisher in 1998 and helped pull the newspaper out of $2.1 million in debt. In 1991, circulation had been 30,000; by 1998, it had increased to 86,000.

Mike Krokos was editor from 1999 to 2004. Circulation in 2000 was around 88,000. Joe Towalski was editor from 2005 to 2014. By 2010, circulation had decreased slightly to 85,000. Jessica Trygstad was interim editor from 2014 to 2015. Circulation in 2015 was around 71,000. Maria Wiering was editor from 2015 to 2022, after which she left for OSV News. Joe Ruff, a former reporter and editor with the Associated Press, became editor in 2022.

The Spirit has won numerous Catholic Media Association awards.

== Publication ==
The Catholic Spirit publishes twice monthly. Readers may subscribe directly or receive a free subscription subsidized by their parish. As of 2024, circulation is around 54,000.
