= Gabriel Revault d'Allonnes =

French psychologist

Gabriel Charles Revault d'Allonnes (6 January 1872 - 12 February 1949) was a French psychologist best known for his study of the psychology of attention.

== Works ==
- (helping Frédéric Rauh), Psychologie appliquée à la morale et à l'éducation, 1900
- 'Délire de persécution à trois avec séquestration volontaire', Journal de psychologue normale et pathologique, No.2, March–April 1905
- 'Role des sensations internes dans les emotions et dans la perception de la duree', Revue Philosophique, December 1905, pp. 592 ff.
- Psychologie d'une religion, 1907
- Les Inclinations, leur rôle dans la psychologie des sentiments, 1907
- (ed.) Lamarck, [selection of writings] by Jean-Baptiste Lamarck, 1910
- L'affaiblissement intellectuel chez les déments: étude clinique par la méthode d'observation expérimentale, 1911, Dissertation.
- 'A Guide for the Psychological Examination of Normal People', Psychologie et la Vie 3 (1929), 11-13
- 'Les formes supérieures de l'attention', Journal de Psychologie
