= Betty Heimann =

German professor (1888–1961)

- Born: Betty Heimann; 29 March 1888; Wandsbek, Germany
- Died: 19 May 1961 (aged 73); Sirmione, Italy
- Education: Christian-Albrechts-Universität zu Kiel, Martin-Luther-Universität Halle-Wittenberg
- Occupation: Indologist

Betty Heimann (29 March 1888, Wandsbek, Germany - 19 May 1961, Sirmione, Italy) was the first woman Indologist to habilitate in Germany. After the Nazis banned Jews from holding academic positions in Germany in 1933, she taught at the University of London and became a British citizen. After the end of World War II she founded the Department of Indian Philosophy and Sanskrit at the University of Ceylon.

She is included with early pioneers of comparative philosophy. Her major works include Studien zur eigenart Indischen denkens (1930), Indian and Western Philosophy: A Study in Contrasts (1937), and Facets of Indian Thought (1964). Her writings have been described as being "characterised by deep thought and refreshing originality."

== Childhood ==
Betty Heimann was born on 29 March 1888. She was the youngest of six children of Isaac Heimann and his wife Margarethe (Levy) Heimann. Her father was a Jewish banker with Hartwig Hertz & Sons in Wandsbek, Germany. Her father died when she was ten. Her mother was noted for her beauty and was a leader of turn-of-the-century Hamburg society.

== Education ==
=== State examinations ===
Heimann attended the Gelehrtenschule des Johanneums in Hamburg, Germany, completing a degree in 1913. She immediately began the study of classical philology, Indian philology and philosophy at the Christian-Albrechts-Universität zu Kiel. In Kiel she studied with Paul Deussen (1845-1919) and with Emil Sieg (1866-1951).

Heimann also spent two semesters in Heidelberg. The preface to her book Facets of Indian Thought mentions the close relationship between Betty Heimann and historian Ruth von Schulze Gaevernitz, "her friend and spiritual companion since student days in Heidelberg".

In 1918 Betty Heimann sat for state examinations in classical philology and philosophy, and graduated summa cum laude.

=== Dissertation ===
From 1919 to 1921 Heimann continued her studies, specializing in Indian philosophy and Sanskrit. Her teachers included Hermann Oldenberg at the University of Göttingen, Hermann Jacobi at the University of Bonn, and Sten Konow at the University of Hamburg.

On 4 January 1921 she successfully submitted her dissertation to Emil Sieg at the University of Kiel, receiving her doctorate. For her dissertation she translated into German and edited a bhashya or commentary by Madhva on the Katha Upanishad.

She accepted a position as an assistant and librarian to the professor of classical Semitic studies in Kiel from 1921 to 1923. Felix Jacoby was a professor of classics at Kiel and Friedrich Otto Schrader became a professor of indology there in 1921.

=== Habilitation ===
Heimann apparently returned to Heidelberg in 1922-1923, where she presented a possible habilitation topic to the Faculty of Arts. However, the majority of the faculty rejected her application for Venia legendi, the right to teach.

Heimann moved to the Martin-Luther-Universität Halle-Wittenberg (University of Halle) as of 1921 and habilitated there in Indology on 1 November 1923, with Eugen Julius Theodor Hultzsch (1857-1927). Her topic was Die Entwicklung des Gottesbegriffes der Upaniṣaden (The development of the concept of God in the Upanishads). Betty Heimann was the first woman academic at Halle, and the first woman indologist to habilitate in Germany.

== Teaching and research ==
=== University of Halle ===
As of 1923 Betty Heimann was the first woman to be a private lecturer at Halle. Her appointment was reported in the local newspaper, Hallische Nachrichten on 19 January 1924. In the course of her studies, her interests had shifted from Indian philology to Indian philosophy, which she saw as influenced by the particular geographic and climatic conditions of India. She used the linguistic methodology she had learned from philology as a way of approaching philosophical questions. Both her methods and her ideas were innovative. As of 1 April 1926 she was appointed to a special lectureship for Indian philosophy at the University of Halle.

Betty Heimann was the president of the Halle chapter of the International Federation of University Women (IFUW) and formed connections between the Halle chapter and the British Federation of University Women (BFUW) in London. In 1930 she received a prize for the best scientific work by a woman from the IFUW for her research work "Studium der Eigenart indischen Denkens" (Study of the Character of Indian Thinking).

As of 11 August 1931 Betty Heimann was appointed as an associate professor (professor extraordinarius) at the University of Halle, filling a position previously held by Eugen Hultzsch. She was able to use the Senior International Fellowship which she had received from the IFUW to go to India, where she traveled from October 1931 to June 1932.

=== Anti-Jewish measures ===
Even before 1933 Heimann was exposed to the hostility of her colleagues because she was Jewish and female. On 7 April 1933 the Law for the Restoration of the Professional Civil Service in Germany was passed, banning Jews from holding public positions, including teaching positions.

Heimann had spoken out against Nazi policy on racial issues, and was denounced at the Ministry of Culture in Berlin for commenting as a Jew on the worthlessness of racial purity. She was placed on a list of targets of the Amtsgruppe IIIA1 as an undesirable.

In September 1933, Heimann traveled to London, where she was invited to give a report about her trip to India to the International Federation of University Women (IFUW). As of September 7, 1933, her professorship at the University of Halle was revoked under the terms of the ban on Jewish academics. She received the news while in England.

=== Emigration to England ===
Heimann did not return to Germany, but emigrated to England. She was able to live at Crosby Hall in London, a residence for visiting university women, run by the British Federation of University Women (BFUW). In 1934 Heimann was one of the first recipients of an emergency German Scholar Residential Fellowship from a fund raised by the BFUW. She was able to obtain work teaching Indian philosophy on a freelance basis at the School of Oriental and African Studies at the University of London. Subsequent short-term awards from the BFUW enabled her to make ends meet while re-establishing herself.

In the Lent term, 1936, she was invited to present the Forlong fund lectures at the School of oriental studies, University of London, with support from the Royal Asiatic Society. The lectures informed her book Indian and western philosophy; a study in contrasts (1937). The book reveals "her long and serious consideration of the differences between these two cultures". In it, she argues that Western and Indian philosophies are grounded in fundamentally different worldviews that must be understood in their own terms. Western thought tends to regard man as both central and superior to the natural world, while Indian thought tends to regard man on terms of equality with nature and with other creatures. Heimann brought to the study of Hinduism "not only specialized Indological expertise but also a comprehensive general knowledge and a great deal of empathy".

This work has led her to be included with early pioneers of comparative philosophy, Rudolf Otto, Georg Misch, Paul Masson-Oursel and Walter Ruben.

India forces us to give up our own modes of thought if we wish to get near her... All our finest instruments, contrived for the dissection of Western thought, in this case, refuse to do their work.

— Betty Heimann

For some time she held a half-time position in the Department of Indian Philosophy at the University of London, which was created specifically for her. She continued to write and present at conferences. She gave a paper on "Deutung und Bedeutung indischer Terminologie" at the International Congress of Orientalists in Rome in 1935, and an address on "Plurality, Polarity, and Unity in Hindu Thought: A Doxographical Study" at the International Congress of Orientalists in Brussels on September 8, 1938. She may also have lectured at the University of Oxford.

In 1939, Betty Heimann acquired British citizenship. After World War II in 1946 she was appointed as a full-time senior lecturer, Professor of Sanskrit and Indian Philosophy in the School of Oriental and African Studies at the University of London.

Among her friends in England were Stella Kramrisch, Heinrich Zimmer, and Penelope Chetwode. Kramrisch described Heimann as "a refugee Professor of Sanskrit from Heidelberg". The preface to Facets of Indian Thought also mentions Ruth Gaevernitz, Terence Gervais, "her partner in philosophical discussion" and Dr. Hilde Wolpe, "her inspired helper and secretary."

=== University of Ceylon ===
From 1945 to 1949 Heimann was a professor at the University of Ceylon in Colombo, Ceylon (later the University of Colombo, Sri Lanka). Heimann was the founding head of the Department of Sanskrit at the university. She was the first professor of Sanskrit and the first woman professor at the University of Ceylon. In 1945, she led a delegation from the University of Ceylon to the Indian Philosophical Congress. Heimann worked hard to popularise the department. Expansion of the department under her direction was attributed in large part to her "remarkable energy". She had to retire once she reached the mandated retirement age of 60 in 1948. Her successor as professor of Sanskrit was O. H. de A. Wijesekera, who had been one of her students at the University of London.

Ceylon University College was formally opened in 1921 in Colombo, Ceylon, and was affiliated with the University of London. The College formed the nucleus of the University of Ceylon, officially created in 1942. As of 1948, Ceylon achieved political independence and became Sri Lanka. Betty Heimann therefore worked at the University of Ceylon, in Colombo, Ceylon, which became Colombo, Sri Lanka.

Although the University of Ceylon was the only university in Ceylon from 1942 to 1972, it had departments in various satellite locations. Between 1952 and 1963, the faculty of Oriental Studies and Arts was located in Peradeniya. Beginning in 1963, courses were offered in both Peradeniya and Colombo. The University of Ceylon Act No. 1 of 1972 replaced the University of Ceylon with the University of Sri Lanka, which existed from 1973 to 1978. In 1978 the University of Sri Lanka was separated into four independent universities. One was in Peradeniya. Another was the University of Colombo, at the original location of Ceylon University College and the University of Ceylon. Although Heimann figures in the common history of both institutions, it can be argued that she did not, technically speaking, teach at either.

=== Retirement ===
Having left the University of Ceylon, Betty Heimann returned to England. She continued to write and publish. In 1954, she spoke at the Twenty-third International Congress of Orientalists at Cambridge. Her presentation, "Hindu Thought in Illustrations. A Primer of Visual Philosophy", used lantern slides to visually demonstrate concepts and systems from Hindu philosophy. She suggested that the emphasis on empirically "seeing" truth in Indian philosophy made this form of presentation particularly effective. Her intention was to publish a Primer of Visual Philosophy, a project that was still in manuscript form at her death.

Among Heimann's friends in Germany were Halle sculptor Grete Budde and her husband Werner Budde. Werner Budde acted legally on Haimann's behalf while she was absent from Germany. Grete Budde sculpted a portrait bust of Betty Heimann, which was eventually given to the University of Halle.

According to one account, as of 1957, Heimann was appointed by the University of Halle as a full professor, effective retroactively from 1935 onwards, which would have qualified her for a full pension. It has been suggested that this story may be apocryphal. A street on the University of Halle campus is named after Betty Heimann.

On 19 May 1961 Betty Heimann died of a heart attack in Sirmione, Italy near Lake Garda. Her obituary, in the magazine Purana, concludes "Hail! May you attain the eternal abode of the Supreme Brahman, beyond all darkness".

The manuscript for her Facets of Indian Thought (1964) was edited and published posthumously by Ruth Gaevernitz, Terence Gervais, and Hilde Wolpe. Her work on visual philosophy remained unpublished.

== Selected works ==
- Madhvas (Anandatirthas) Kommentar zur Kathaka-Upanisad. Sanskrit-Text in Transkription nebst Übersetzung und Noten (Diss., Leipzig: Harrassowitz, 1921)
- Die Tiefschlafspekulation der alten Upanisaden. München-Neubiberg: Schloss 1922.
- Die Entwicklung des Gottesbegriffes der Upaniṣaden (1926)
- Studien zur eigenart Indischen denkens. Tübingen: Mohr, 1930.
- Indian and western philosophy: a study in contrasts. London: G. Allen & Unwin, ltd., 1937.
- India's past: a key to India's present. Rugby, Eng.: Printed for D. Thomas by A. Frost & sons, ltd., 1944.
- The significance of prefixes in Sanskrit philosophical terminology. London: Royal Asiatic Society, 1951.
- Facets of Indian Thought. Posthumously edited by Terence Gervais, Ruth von Schulze Gaevernitz, and Hilde Wolpe. New York: Schocken Books; London: George Allen & Unwin, 1964.
- An Indiens Tempelstätten: Fotoimpressionen der Indologin Betty Heimann; [Begleitpublikation zur gleichnamigen Ausstellung im Linden-Museum Stuttgart ...] (At India's temple sites: Photo impressions of the Indologist Betty Heimann; [Accompanying publication to the exhibition of the same name in the Linden-Museum Stuttgart ...) Stuttgart: Linden-Museum, 2003

== Relations ==
Betty Heimann (1888-1961) had a cousin of the same name. Betty Heimann (1885-1926) received her doctorate in 1916 under sociologist and philosopher Georg Simmel in Strasbourg and taught at the University of Utrecht.
