= Gervasius =

Gervasius is a masculine given name. It may refer to:

- Gervasius and Protasius, Christian martyrs, probably in the 2nd century
- Gervasius (bishop of Nyitra) (died after c. 1128), Hungarian prelate
- Gervasius (bishop of Győr) (died after 1157 or 1158), Hungarian prelate
- Gervase of Tilbury (Gervasius Tilberiensis in Latin) (c. 1150–1220), English canon lawyer, statesman and cleric
- Gervasius de Wolvehope (fl. 1295–1302), English Member of Parliament

== See also ==
- Gervase (disambiguation)
- Gervaise (disambiguation)
