= Gervais =

Gervais may refer to:

== People and fictional characters ==
- Gervais (name), a list of people and fictional characters with the given name or surname

== Places ==
- Gervais, Oregon
- Gervais Lake, a lake in Minnesota
- Gervais Township, Minnesota
- Gervais Road, part of 170 Street, Edmonton, Alberta, Canada

== Other uses ==
- Gervais, a French cheese producer which merged with Groupe Danone in 1967
- Gervais High School, a public high school in Gervais, Oregon

== See also ==
- Gervaise (disambiguation)
- Gervas (disambiguation)
- Gervase (disambiguation)
- Gervais's fruit-eating bat
- Gervais's funnel-eared bat
- Saint Gervais (disambiguation)
- Gervasius and Protasius, 2nd century Christian martyrs
