= Terence White =

Terence White may refer to:

- T. H. White (1906–1964), author
- Terence White Gervais (1913–1968), or Terence White, musician and writer
- Terence de Vere White (1912–1994), writer and lawyer
- Snowy White (born 1948), real name Terence Charles White; guitarist
- Terry White (born 1936), Australian pharmacist, businessman and politician
- Terry White (sprint canoeist) (born 1955)
