= Nazaire Le Vasseur =

Canadian writer and musician

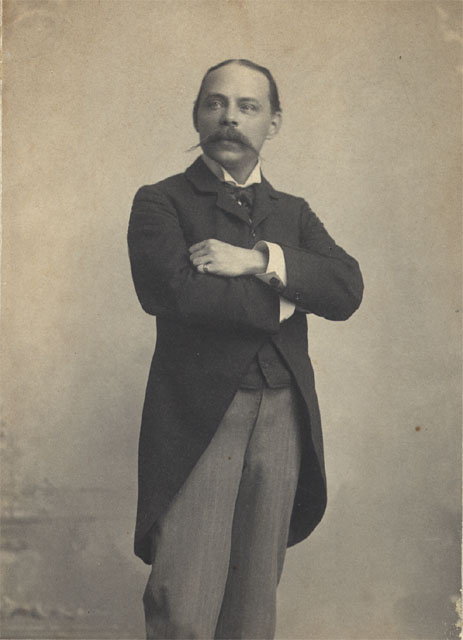
Nazaire Le Vasseur

Nazaire Le Vasseur (February 6, 1848 – November 8, 1927) was a Canadian writer and musician.

The son of Zéphirin Levasseur and Madeleine Langevin, he was born Louis-Nazaire-Zéphirin Levasseur in Quebec City. Le Vasseur began studying music with Marie-Hippolyte-Antoine Dessane by the age of five. He was educated at the Petit Séminaire de Québec and studied medicine at Université Laval, but was not able to complete his studies because of a downturn in the family's finances. He began work with the newspaper L'Événement; from 1872 to 1878, he was chief editor. In 1894, with Émile La Salle, he founded La Revue commerciale, which became La Semaine commerciale.

From 1878 to 1915, he was a gas and gas meter inspector for the Canadian government. Between 1898 and 1913, Le Vasseur represented various Central and South American countries, including Brazil, Chile, Guatemala and Nicaragua, as consul in Quebec.

In 1869, with his teacher Dessane, he founded the Société Musicale Sainte-Cécile, a choir based in Quebec City; from 1873 to 1890, he served as its director. From 1873 to 1881, he was organist for the church of Saint-Roch. In 1880, he was a member of the committee established by the Saint-Jean-Baptiste Association to commission a national anthem; "O Canada" was performed for the first time at Saint-Jean-Baptiste Day celebrations that year. He was co-founder and violinist for the Septuor Haydn, which became the nucleus of the Société Symphonique de Québec (later the Orchestre Symphonique de Québec). He became a member of the Académie de musique du Québec in 1887.

Le Vasseur composed a number of songs, including "Aurora Snow Shoe Club", "Le Jour de l'An à la campagne" and "On me disait", as well as a romance for string quintet and a military march. He also wrote a series of articles for the journal La Musique describing 19th century musical events in Quebec.

He was a founding member of the Geographical Society of Quebec in 1877. He published a number of articles in the society's journal and served as its president from 1898 to 1905. Le Vasseur also help raise funds to assist Joseph-Elzéar Bernier with his expeditions in the Canadian arctic. He was also a founding member of the Cercle des Dix, a Quebec society of musicians and writers, and of the Société du parler français au Canada.

Le Vasseur was a member of the 9th Battalion Volunteer Militia Rifles and served during the North-West Rebellion.

In 1872, he married Phédora Venner, a singer. His daughter Irma was the first French-Canadian woman to become a doctor.

Le Vasseur died in Quebec City at the age of 79.

Lac Levasseur was named in his honour.
