= Gervas =

Gervas may refer to:

== People ==
- Gervais (name), list of people with the given name or surname

== See also ==
- Gervais (disambiguation)
- Gervaise (disambiguation)
- Gervase (disambiguation)
