= Revue philosophique de la France et de l'étranger =

French academic journal

The Revue philosophique de la France et de l'étranger is an academic journal founded by Théodule-Armand Ribot in 1876. It was continued by Lucien Lévy-Bruhl, Émile Bréhier, Paul Masson-Oursel, and Pierre-Maxime Schuhl. Originally published monthly, it became fortnightly for 30 years, and finally quarterly. It is currently edited by Yvon Brès and Dominique Merllié and published by Presses universitaires de France.

== See also ==
- List of philosophy journals
