= Church of St. Peter (Gentilly Township, Minnesota) =

Historic church in Minnesota, United States

- St. Peter's Catholic Church
- U.S. National Register of Historic Places
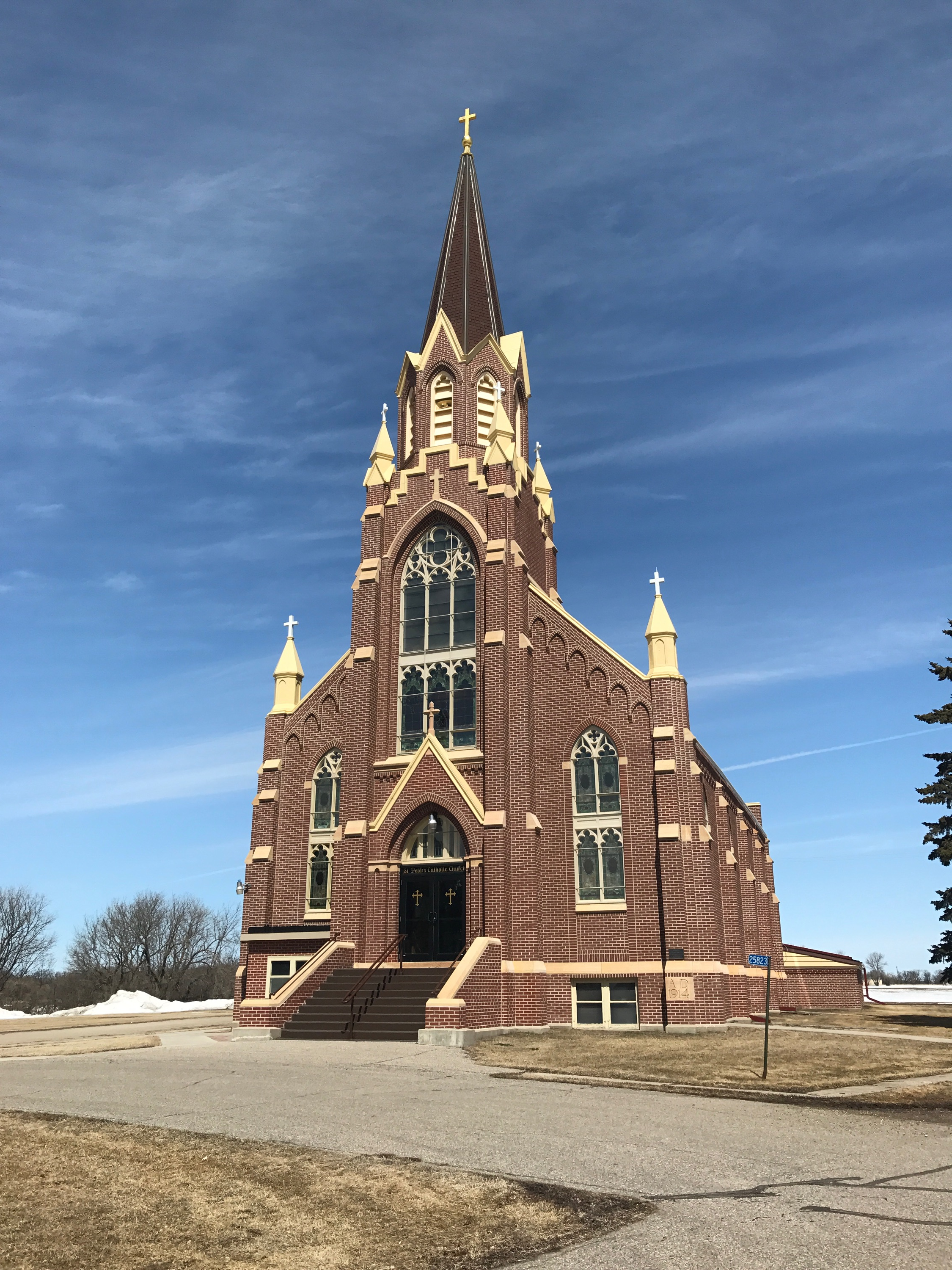

- Location within Minnesota Location within the United States
- Location: 25823 185th Avenue SW, Gentilly Township, Minnesota
- Coordinates: 47°47′32″N 96°26′54″W
- Area: 3.5 acres (1.4 ha)
- Built: 1902 (rectory), 1914–15 (church)
- Architect: Halstead and Sullivan
- Architectural style: Neo-Gothic
- NRHP reference No.: 82002994
- Added to NRHP: August 19, 1982

St. Peter's Catholic Church is a historic church in Gentilly Township, Minnesota, United States. The church, built from 1914 to 1915, and the adjacent 1902 rectory were listed on the National Register of Historic Places in 1982. The church was noted for its exemplary Gothic Revival architecture, and both buildings served as the anchor of a Catholic French Canadian settlement. St. Peter's celebrated its centennial in 2014 with a renovation project.
