= 9th National Eucharistic Congress (United States) =

1941 Catholic event in Minnesota, US

Coordinates: 44°58′52″N 93°10′5″W

Ninth National Eucharistic Congress
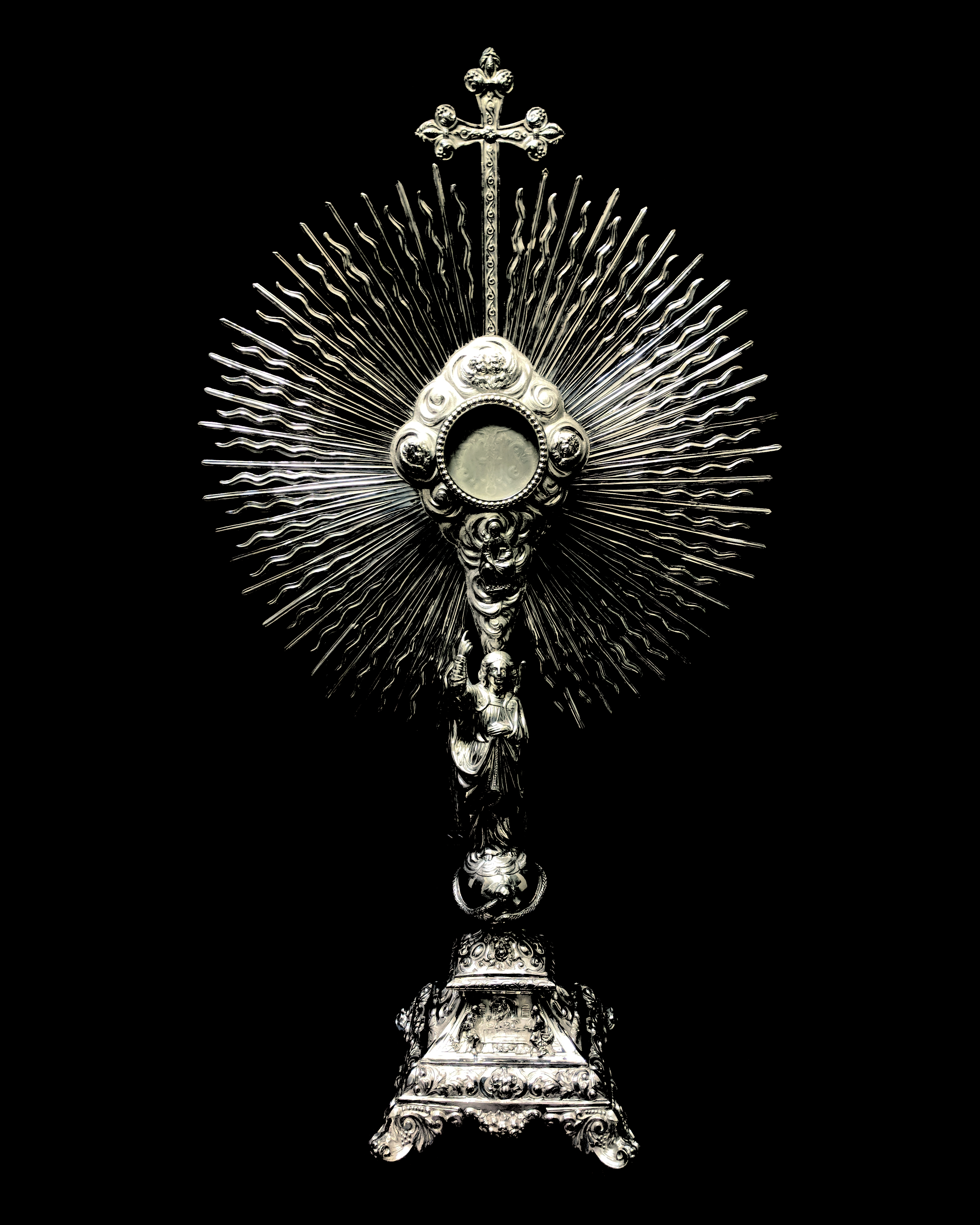
- The monstrance used at the Eucharistic Congress
- Date: June 23–26, 1941
- Venue: Minnesota State Fair
- Location: Falcon Heights, Minnesota
- Type: Eucharistic congress
- Theme: Our Eucharistic Lord Glorified by Sacrifice
- Patron: Archbishop John Gregory Murray
- Participants: 475,000

The Ninth National Eucharistic Congress was a Catholic Eucharistic congress held from June 23 to 26, 1941, at the Minnesota State Fairgrounds in Falcon Heights, Minnesota. The event, meant to foster devotion to the sacrament of the Eucharist, attracted hundreds of thousands of attendees. While primarily at the Eucharistic Center set up at the fairgrounds, other events took place at Saint Paul Union Depot, the Minneapolis Auditorium, the St. Paul Auditorium, the Cathedral of Saint Paul and the Basilica of St. Mary elsewhere in Minnesota. The Archdiocese of Saint Paul, led by Archbishop John Gregory Murray, was the host of the congress.

== Background ==
The first International Eucharistic Congress owed its inspiration to Bishop Gaston de Ségur, and was held at Lille, France, on June 21, 1881. The initial inspiration behind the idea came from the laywoman Marie-Marthe-Baptistine Tamisier (1834–1910) who spent a decade lobbying clergy after the French Revolution in an effort to restore religiosity to France. In 1879, Pope Leo XIII established a committee to plan the first international Eucharistic congress. In the wake of these international congresses, national congresses sprung up in the United States. Prior to the 1941 event, there were nine other National Eucharistic Congresses in the United States, as well as two international congresses.

=== Preparation ===
Archbishop Murray was originally invited to host the Ninth Congress at the Eighth Congress in New Orleans in 1938. Several months later, he accepted the proposition and Fr. Francis Missia began preparations for the thousand voice adult and children's choirs for the Masses. The planning of the congress was carried out by a committee consisting of Fr. James Reardon, rector of the Basilica of Saint Mary; Fr. William Brand, chaplain of the Catholic Boys' Home; and Mr. Frank Delaney, vice-president of the First National Bank of Saint Paul. They were advised by twenty-two committees of priests, sisters, and laity. Missia arranged a hymnal that was distributed to all schools in June 1940 so that all students could be prepared for the liturgies, especially those students that would make up the combined children's choir.

The theme of the congress was Our Eucharistic Lord Glorified by Sacrifice based on Colossians 1:24 and Miserentissimus Redemptor. Archbishop Murray selected the speakers, topics for sectional meetings, and bishop presiders for the various Pontifical liturgies.

A monstrance brought by the Rev. Felix Tissot from France in 1865 was the official monstrance of the congress, and was featured prominently on branding for the event.

== Congress ==
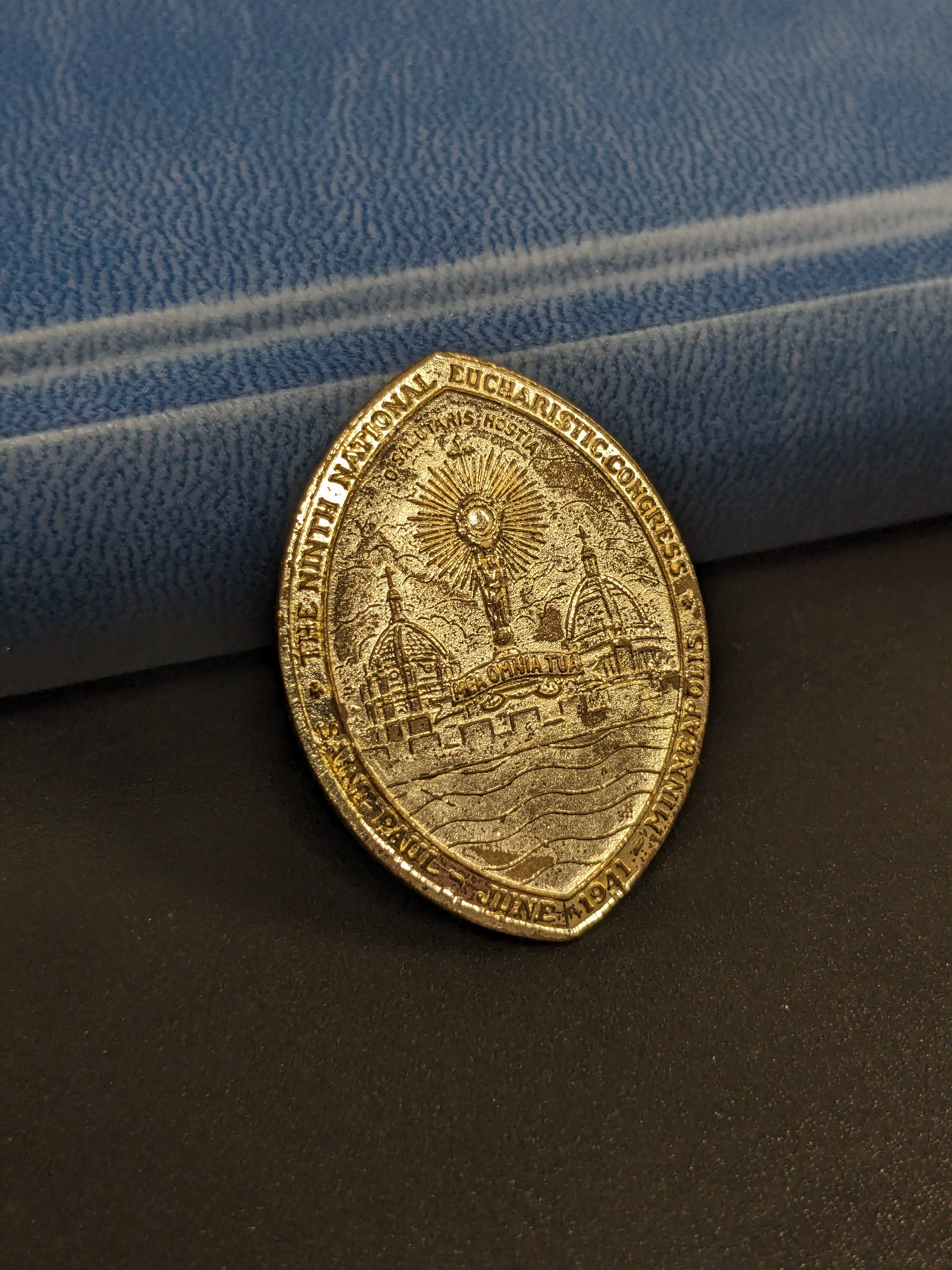
A commemorative pin from the congress

At the congress, there were twenty-six "sectional" or break-out meetings for liturgists, employers and employees talking on Catholic social teaching, and more. More than half of the American Catholic hierarchy were present. The Minneapolis Park Board donated $1,000 for floral arrangements on the Grant Street Mall.

Due to lack of ability to concelebrate Mass prior to the reforms of Vatican II, enough altars were set up for 500 Masses to be said simultaneously every half-hour between 6am and 9am daily, with 100 altars set up at both the Minneapolis Auditorium and the St. Paul Auditorium and other altars set up in the Saint Paul Hotel and the Eucharistic Center at the state fairgrounds. Throughout the congress, special curiosity was given to an altar in the crypt of the Church of the Nativity in Saint Paul; the altar was set up versus populum, "the only one of its kind in the country."

On Sunday June 22, the day prior to the start of the congress, Archbishop Murray encouraged a general communion of all the faithful in a time where frequent reception of communion was not common, seeking the "welding together of many single souls to make the living unity that would be the Congress".

=== Monday, June 23 ===
The congress began with the arrival of the papal legate, Cardinal Dennis Dougherty, to Saint Paul Union Depot at 4pm. A liturgical reception took place at 4:30pm at the Cathedral of Saint Paul, followed by a formal dinner at the Saint Paul Hotel. At 8:30pm, an event was held at the Minneapolis Auditorium where the papal legate was formally and civically welcomed. Around 10,000 attended on the inside with 4,000 in the streets outside. Mayor George E. Leach of Minneapolis and Mayor John J. McDonough of Saint Paul were also present. The governor of Minnesota, Harold Stassen, gave an address welcoming all the visitors to the event.

=== Tuesday, June 24 ===
The day began with a 10am Pontifical Mass celebrated by the papal legate at the Eucharistic Center at the state fairgrounds. In the afternoon, sectional meetings were held for various groups - clergy, teachers, parents, journalists, catechists, rural workers, servicemen, and choristers. A military sectional meeting and review took place at Fort Snelling with 1,200 soldiers and ROTC cadets. There was a "Holy Hour for Youth" held at the Minneapolis Auditorium, attended by more than 4,000. A similar Holy Hour was also held in the Saint Paul Auditorium. There was an 11pm Holy Hour for men followed by midnight Mass was held at the state fairgrounds, attended by 75,000 men and 5,000 women. Over 10,000 went to confession.

=== Wednesday, June 25 ===
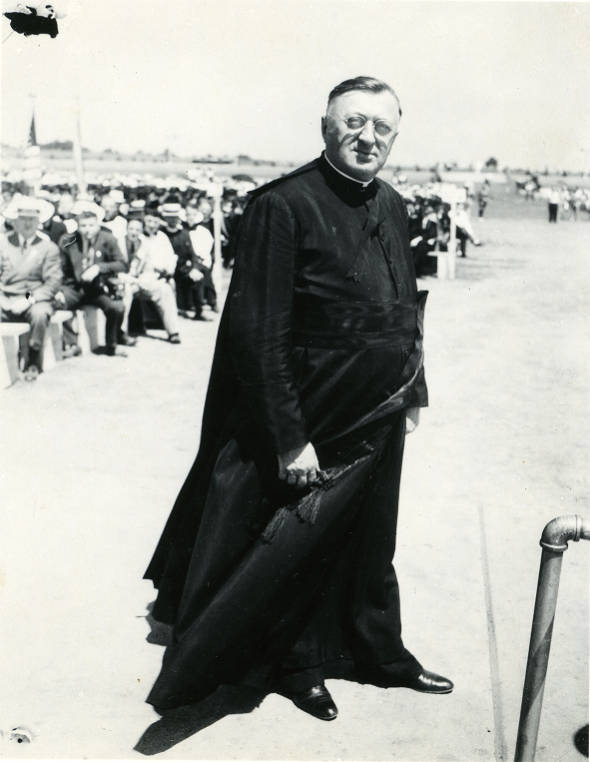
Fr. Francis Missia, choir director, at the Eucharistic Congress at the Minnesota State Fairgrounds in 1941

A Pontifical Mass for children, parents, and teachers was held at the grandstand of the Minnesota State Fair. About 14,000 grade school students from the Archdiocese of Saint Paul and Minneapolis were in attendance. Missia led a choir consisting of "thousands of pupils". Following the Mass, sectional meetings were held for liturgists, seminarians, college teachers, professionals, government workers, nurses, charity workers, and women. In the evening there were holy hours celebrated for clergy, sisters, and women, as well as youth meetings held at the Saint Paul Auditorium and Incarnation parish in Minneapolis.

=== Thursday, June 26 ===
Harold Stassen, the governor of Minnesota, declared June 26 to be a state holiday and encouraged all governmental offices and businesses to close for the afternoon to accommodate the procession to take place at 1:30pm.

A Maronite Rite Mass was celebrated at the Cathedral of St. Paul at 8:30am by Monsignor Peter Farah Assemani. At the same time, Basil Takach, a bishop of the Byzantine Catholic Archeparchy of Pittsburgh, celebrated a Pontifical Mass in the Byzantine Rite at the Basilica of St. Mary. A Pontifical Mass for all pilgrims was celebrated at the Eucharistic Center at the fairgrounds grandstand by Archbishop John J. Glennon. Archbishop Joseph Rummel gave the sermon. At noon, immediately following the Mass, Pope Pius XII delivered a radio address from Vatican City over the loudspeaker system. The Pope's exhorted those present to be thankful for the freedom with which they were able to celebrate their religion and contrasted it with the restrictions present in many other countries. He called on those listening to offer prayers of sacrifice and reparation to pray against encroachments against free practice of religious life.

==== Eucharistic Procession ====
The closing event of the Congress was a Eucharistic Procession from the Church of Saint Andrew in Como Park and ending at the Eucharistic Center at the fairgrounds.

As the crowd was gathering, a strong but brief downpour came down at around one o'clock. While scattered sprinkling happened throughout the rest of the procession, no further heavy rain took place. The rain lowered the day's temperature, which up to that point had a high of 92 °F (33 °C) over 300 people were treated for heat stroke at the Boy Scout headquarters, though that number had been expected to be higher before the rain.

The event started at 1:30pm with a transcript of the Pope's earlier address being read over various loudspeakers hung on trees along the route. Archbishop Murray then began to carry the monstrance from Saint Andrew's. Around a third of the way to the fairgrounds, and Altar of Exposition had been set up in Como Park. The monstrance was placed on the altar, and then the entirety of those in procession were able to walk by and bow in veneration. Among the many groups in procession were a police and military escort, various men's and women's societies from the Archdiocese of St. Paul and other dioceses, Catholic youth organizations, and vested clergy. They were followed by the main group of pilgrims, divided into their respective parishes and led by their parish priest. In total, those in procession numbered around 80,000. After all but one parish group had passed, the main body of the procession reformed and the monstrance was taken from the altar by Archbishop Cicognani. The procession then proceeded the rest of the way to the fairgrounds. Upon reaching the Eucharistic Temple at the fairgrounds grandstand, the monstrance was handed to Cardinal Dougherty. As the monstrance arrived at the high altar, rain began to fall once again, developing into a downpour. Many who lived in the area, experiencing the crowds and the developing rain, returned home. The Tantum Ergo was sung and Dougherty then offered benediction, followed by a singing of the Te Deum. Around 100,000 to 125,000 were estimated to have been present for benediction, though around 170,000 in total were estimated to have participated throughout the day.

=== Friday, June 27 ===
While formally after the congress had closed, the Basilica of St. Mary was formally consecrated by Cardinal Dennis Dougherty. The various side altars of the church were consecrated by Cardinal Amleto Giovanni Cicognani, Archbishop John Gregory Murray of Saint Paul, Bishop John Jeremiah Lawler of Rapid City, Bishop James Morrison of Antigonish, Nova Scotia, Bishop Francis Kelley of Oklahoma City-Tulsa, Bishop Francis Martin Kelly of Winona, and Bishop Aloisius Joseph Muench of Fargo.

== Post-Congress ==
After the 1941 congress, Eucharistic congresses both domestically and internationally were put on hold due to the outbreak of World War II. Bishop Joseph Schrembs, promoter of national Eucharistic congresses, died shortly after the close of the war. Archbishop Richard Cushing succeeded Schrembs in the role and established a committee for national Eucharistic congresses in 1946, but despite the establishment of that committee, no national congresses were held. There would not be another Eucharistic congress in the United States until 1976 when the international congress occurred in Philadelphia. The next National Eucharistic Congress did not occur until July 2024.

The monstrance used at the congress is now at the Saint Paul Seminary. It was carried during the 2024 Eucharistic pilgrimage in St. Paul, Minnesota.
