= Lake Belle Taine =

Lake in the state of Minnesota, United States

- Location within Minnesota Location within the United States
- Location: Hubbard County, Minnesota
- Coordinates: 46°56′32″N 94°52′02″W
- Type: lake

Lake Belle Taine is a lake in Hubbard County, Minnesota, United States.

The lake was first named by the settlers of Hubbard County as "Elbow Lake" for its sharply bent outlines. Its name in Ojibwe is Gaa-aachaajigwaatigweyaag zaaga'igan meaning "the lake into which the river pitches and ceases to flow,—dies there" due to it having no visible outlet. The first written record of the name, Belle Taine, is found in the survey notes made by Mahlon Black, deputy surveyor, who surveyed Nevis Township in the fall of 1870.

== See also ==
- List of lakes in Minnesota
