= Virginie Gervais =

French actress (born 1979)

Virginie Caprice
- Born: Virginie Gervais; 24 June 1979 (age 46); Versailles, France
- Other names: Virginia, Virginie, Virginie Caprice
- Height: 1.62 m (5 ft 4 in)

Virginie Gervais (born 24 June 1979), also known as Virginie Caprice, is a French glamour model, television personality, and former pornographic actress.

== Early life ==
The Versailles-born Caprice was the 2005 winner of FHM France's "High Street Honeys" competition. It was later discovered that she had made an adult film before being famous, which appeared soon on the Internet and propelled her to fame.

== Career ==
In 2002, a German porn producer contacted Gervais. He proposed that she appear in his next film... X, Anmacherinnen 15: Enge Spalten. Later she started using a new model name, 'Virginie Caprice', as her success continued and increased her appearances in TV commercials, music videos, films and magazines. In 2007 she participated in another adult film, the Story of Virginie (2007), produced by Marc Dorcel and distributed by Wicked Pictures.

In February 2008, she played the role of a stripper in Episode 10 of the French TV series, Paris enquêtes criminelles. The episode, Un cri dans la nuit (A scream in the night) was broadcast on TF1 in February 2008. She has been a cover model for FHM magazine's Spain edition and had pictorials in FHM and Newlook (France) magazine. She appears as an icon model for a series in fashion magazine Beauty Flow.

She has promoted soccer worldwide.

== Filmography ==
- Anmacherinnen 15: Enge Spalten (2002)
- 19 ans et putes (2002)
- Dépucelée par son père (2002)
- Story of Virginie (2007)

== Magazines ==
- Newlook France June 2007 (Magazine cover and pictorial).
- FHM Spain August 2007 (Magazine cover and pictorial).
- Entrevue France November 2007 (Magazine cover)
