= Irma LeVasseur =

Canadian physician

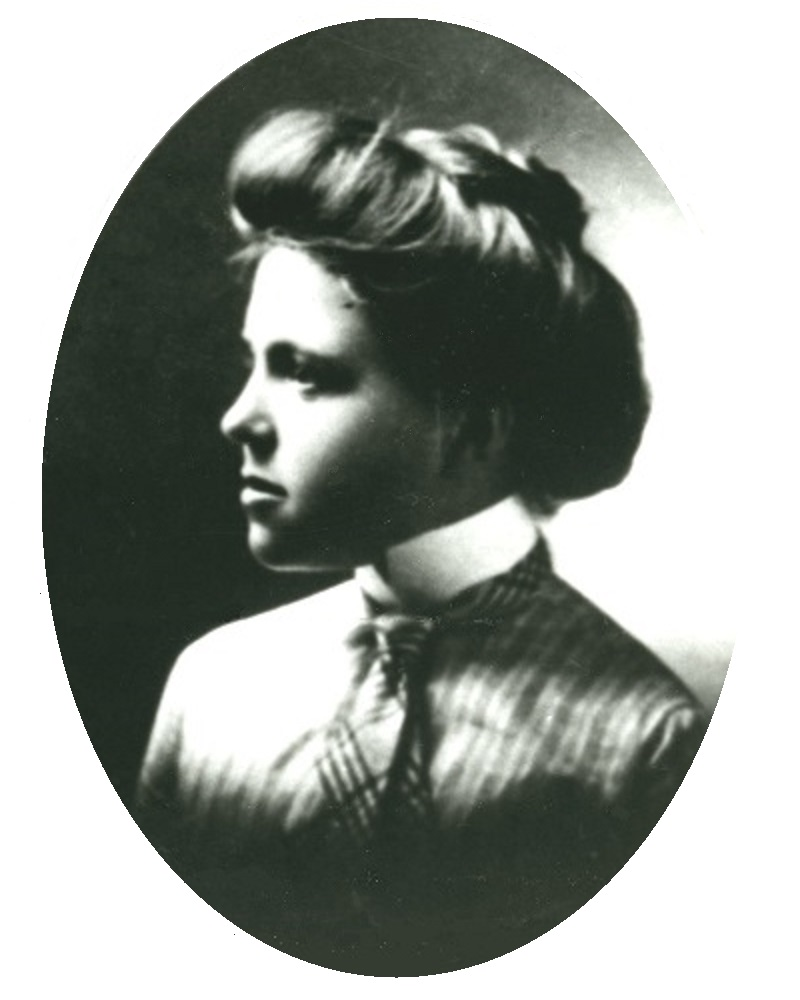
- Born: 20 January 1877; Saint-Roch
- Died: 22 January 1964; Quebec City
- Education: University of Minnesota Medical School, College Jesus-Marie of Sillery, École normale Laval
- Occupation: Medical doctor
- Parents: Nazaire Le Vasseur (father); Phédora Venner (mother)
- Awards: Persons of National Historic Significance (2008)

Irma LeVasseur (January 20, 1877 – January 18, 1964) was a Canadian physician. She was a pioneer in pediatric medicine and was the first French-Canadian woman to become a doctor. Her surname also appears as Le Vasseur.

== Early life and career ==
The daughter of Phédora Venner ( left the family in 1887), a singer, and Louis-Nazaire LeVasseur, a journalist, she was born in Quebec City. She was educated at the Couvent Jésus-Marie in Sillery and the École normale Laval. Because women were not allowed to study medicine in Canada, she went on to study at the School of Medicine at Saint Paul University in Minnesota, graduating in 1900. LeVasseur practised medicine in New York City for some time. In 1903, a private member's bill was passed in the Quebec Assembly to allow her to practise medicine. Soon afterwards, she went on to study pediatrics in France and Germany.

On her return to Quebec in 1906, she worked at the Crèche de la Miséricorde in Montreal. In 1907, with Justine Lacoste-Beaubien, she founded the Hôpital Sainte-Justine. She left for New York City the following year, where she served as medical inspector for schools until 1915. In that year, she travelled to Serbia to help deal with a typhoid epidemic there. LeVasseur began working at a military hospital in France in 1918. Later that year, she worked for the Red Cross in New York.

LeVasseur returned to Quebec City in 1922. In 1923, with other doctors, she founded the Hôpital de l'Enfant-Jésus, investing her own money in the project. After some disagreements with the administration, she left that institution. She later established the Hôpital des Enfants malades, which looked after children with disabilities. She also established a school for children with disabilities which later became part of the Institut de réadaptation en déficience physique de Québec. She later examined female recruits for the Canadian Army during World War II.

From November 1957 to July 1958, LeVasseur was committed to the Hôpital Saint-Michel Archange, having been judged mentally ill; she was, however, able to defend herself against this diagnosis. She died in Quebec City six years later, alone and destitute.

== Honours ==
In 1950, the Cercle des femmes universitaires of Quebec organized a celebration for LeVasseur's golden jubilee.

Mont Irma-LeVasseur at Quebec City, Parc Irma-LeVasseur in Outremont and streets in Montreal and Quebec City were named in her honour. A scholarship was established in her name by the Québec Secrétariat à la condition féminine.

LeVasseur was named a Person of National Historic Significance by the Canadian government in 2008.
