= Gervaise =

Gervaise may refer to:

== People ==
- Gervais (name), list of people with the given name or surname

== Other uses ==
- Gervaise (film), 1956 French film directed by René Clément
- Gervaise Macquart, 1995 opera by Giselher Klebe
- Cyclone Gervaise, a 1975 South-West Indian Ocean cyclone

== See also ==
- Gervais (disambiguation)
- Gervas (disambiguation)
- Gervase (disambiguation)
