= Terence White Gervais =

English musician and writer (1913–1968)

- Undated photo of Gervais
- Born: 22 May 1913; Kingston upon Thames, Surrey, England
- Died: 2 November 1968 (aged 55); Richmond, Surrey, England
- Other name: Terence White

Terence White Gervais (22 May 1913 – 2 November 1968), also known as Terence White, was an English musician and writer. He was active as a polyglot poet, orientalist, musicologist, composer, logician, film theorist, psychoanalyst, playwright, translator, music critic, organist, and conductor.

Gervais was born in Kingston upon Thames on 22 May 1913, partially of Irish, French, and African descent. (Note: Il Piccolo records his birth year as 1905.) He was educated at St Paul's School and later attended the Royal College of Music. By April 1936, he was described as practising four arts and having authored ballets and stage works. He contributed to music periodicals, initially under the name Terence White, and then adding his mother's name Gervais from 1946 onward.

Gervais contributed entries on Arturo Toscanini and Thomas Beecham to the fifth edition of Grove's Dictionary of Music and Musicians (1954), which were well received by Irving Kolodin. He also contributed an entry on Kaikhosru Shapurji Sorabji to Grove, and articles to The Chesterian, Music and Letters, the British Journal of Psychology, and The Hibbert Journal. Also described as a "writer on flagellation" and "Theosophist and flagellant", his book Chastisement Across the Ages was published in 1956 by the Fortune Press under the pseudonym "Gervas d'Olbert". This book was described by Timothy D'Arch Smith as an "original, if discursive study" and by Zachary Leader as a "soft-porn" title.

Gervais is known to have visited James Joyce in 1938 to ask him if his book Finnegans Wake was a blending of literature and music, which Joyce denied, saying it was "pure music". In response, Gervais questioned "but are there not levels of meaning to be explored?", which Joyce also denied, saying that "it's meant to make you laugh". Gervais is furthermore speculated to have authored a cryptic French sonnet about the wartorn city of Trieste after World War II, dedicated to Joyce's son Giorgio. The sonnet, credited to one "Terenzio", was found among Giorgio's personal belongings and was later delivered to the Zurich James Joyce Foundation. Owing to his divergent interests, Il Piccolo characterized Gervais as "a nomad in search of artificial paradises." Gervais was mentioned as a close friend of Betty Heimann in the introductory note to her posthumously released Facets of Indian Thought (1964). He died at Richmond, Surrey, on 2 November 1968.
