= Gervais Lake =

Lake in the state of Minnesota, United States

- Location within Minnesota
- Location: Ramsey County, Minnesota
- Coordinates: 45°1′12″N 93°4′14″W
- Type: lake
- Surface area: 235.01 acres (95.11 ha)
- Max. depth: 41 feet (12 m)
- Shore length^{1}: 3.3 miles (5.3 km)
- ^{1} Shore length is not a well-defined measure.

Gervais Lake is a lake in Ramsey County, in the U.S. state of Minnesota.

Gervais Lake was named after Benjamin Gervais, a pioneer who settled at the lake in 1844.

Fish found in the lake include, black bullhead, black crappie, bluegill, common carp, green sunfish, hybrid sunfish, largemouth bass, northern pike, pumpkinseed, tiger muskellunge, walleye, white sucker, yellow bullhead, and yellow perch.

== See also ==
- List of lakes in Minnesota
