= Paul Masson-Oursel =

French orientalist and philosopher

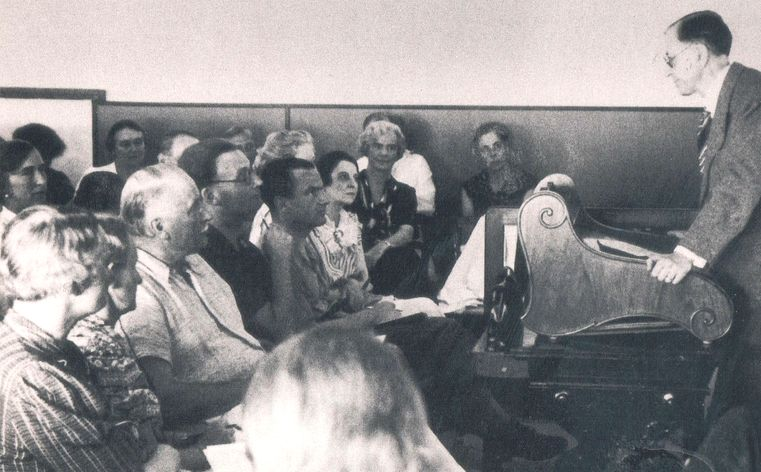

Paul Masson-Oursel (5 September 1882 – 18 March 1956) was a French orientalist and philosopher, a pioneer of 'comparative philosophy'.

Masson-Oursel was a student of Lucien Lévy-Bruhl, Henri Bergson, Emile Durkheim, Pierre Janet, André Lalande, Marcel Mauss. With Sylvain Lévy, Alfred Foucher, Chavannes, Clément Huart, he learned Sanskrit, Tibetan, Chinese, Arabic. La Philosophie Comparée, his Sorbonne doctoral dissertation, attempted to apply Comtean positivism and a comparative method which identified 'analogies' between the philosophies of Europe, India and China. Masson-Oursel argued that "philosophy cannot achieve positivity so long as its investigations are restricted to the thought of our own civilization", since "no one philosophy has the right to put itself forward as co-extensive with the human mind".

Masson-Oursel died in Paris.

English and German Publications

- Comparative philosophy, London, K. Paul, Trench, Trubner & Co.; New York, Harcourt, Brace & Co., 1926. Translated by F. G. Crookshank
- History of Philosophy. in Philosophy today: essays on recent developments in the field of philosophy. Ed. by Edward Leroy Schaub. Chicago, Open Court Publishing Co., 1928. pp. 250–262
- Das samsara. Ein indisches Gewissensdrama. in Forum Philosophicum, I, 3. 1931. (German transl. by Raymond Schmidt) pp. 334–344
- 1. The Indian Conception of Psychology 2. Indian Techniques of Salvation. in Spirit and Nature, Papers from the Eranos Yearbooks, Bollingen series, 30, 1. Ed. by Joseph Campbell. Princeton, Princeton University Press, 1972. pp. 204–212. [1936]
- I. - Die indishchen Erlösungstheorien im Rahmen der Heisreligionen. II. – Die Gnadenlehre im religiösen Denken Indiens. in Eranos Jahrbuch, 1936–1937. pp. 113–133
- I. Die indische Auffassung der psychologischen Gegebenheiten. II. Die indischen Heilstechniken Eranos-Jahrbuch 5, 1937–1938, pp. 79–91
- True philosophy is comparative philosophy. in Philosophy East and West, vol. 1, n° 1. April 1951. pp. 6–9
- The Indian Theories of Redemption in the Frame of the Religions of Salvation. The doctrine of grace in the religious thought of India. In The Mysteries. Papers from the Eranos Yearbooks, Bollingen series, 30. 2. Ed. by Joseph Campbell. Princeton, Princeton University Press, 1955. pp. 3–13. English translation of I. Die indishchen Erlösungstheorien im Rahmen der Heisreligionen. II. – Die Gnadenlehre im religiösen Denken Indiens. Eranos Jahrbuch, 1936–1937. pp. 113–133
- Indian Mythology [with Louise Morin]. New Larousse Encyclopedia of Mythology. Introd. by Robert Graves. London, Hamlyn, 1977. pp. 325–378
- R. Krishnaswami Aiyar (compiler), Dialogues with the Guru. Talks with His Holiness Sri Chandrasekhara Bharati Swaminah late Sankaracharya of Sringeri Mutt. Bombay, Chetana, s. d.[1956], [ introduction]

== Translated texts ==
- India and colonization, [Inde et colonisation]. Harmonie, 13ème année, n° 4. Octobre-décembre 1949. pp. 80–82, translated by Rupali Bhave.
- The two Indias and their mutual tolerance, [Les deux Indes et leur tolérance mutuelle]. Harmonie, 13ème année, n° 3. Juillet-septembre 1949. pp. 61–63, translated by Asha Ogale.
