= Gentilly Township, Polk County, Minnesota =

Gentilly Township, Minnesota
- Township
- Location of Gentilly Township, within Polk County, Minnesota
- Coordinates: 47°47′48″N 96°24′21″W
- Country: United States
- State: Minnesota
- County: Polk

Area
  - Total: 32.0 sq mi (82.9 km^{2})
  - Land: 32.0 sq mi (82.9 km^{2})
  - Water: 0 sq mi (0.0 km^{2})
- Elevation: 958 ft (292 m)

Population (2020)
  - Total: 260
  - Density: 8.1/sq mi (3.1/km^{2})
- Time zone: UTC-6 (Central (CST))
  - Summer (DST): UTC-5 (CDT)
- ZIP code: 56716
- Area code: 218
- FIPS code: 27-23480
- GNIS feature ID: 0664258

Gentilly Township is a township in Polk County, Minnesota, United States. It is part of the Grand Forks-ND-MN Metropolitan Statistical Area. The population was 260 at the 2020 census. Founded by French-Canadians, Gentilly Township was organized in 1879, and named after Gentilly, Quebec.

== Geography ==
According to the United States Census Bureau, the township has a total area of 32.0 square miles (83 km^{2}), all land.

== Demographics ==
As of the census of 2000, there were 319 people, 115 households, and 90 families residing in the township. The population density was 10.0 inhabitants per square mile (3.9/km^{2}). There were 118 housing units at an average density of 3.7 per square mile (1.4/km^{2}). The racial makeup of the township was 96.87% White, 2.19% Native American, 0.31% Pacific Islander, 0.63% from other races. Hispanic or Latino of any race were 2.82% of the population.

There were 115 households, out of which 38.3% had children under the age of 18 living with them, 72.2% were married couples living together, 6.1% had a female householder with no husband present, and 21.7% were non-families. 17.4% of all households were made up of individuals, and 5.2% had someone living alone who was 65 years of age or older. The average household size was 2.77 and the average family size was 3.11.

In the township the population was spread out, with 31.7% under the age of 18, 6.9% from 18 to 24, 28.5% from 25 to 44, 21.6% from 45 to 64, and 11.3% who were 65 years of age or older. The median age was 35 years. For every 100 females, there were 89.9 males. For every 100 females age 18 and over, there were 107.6 males.

The median income for a household in the township was $34,583, and the median income for a family was $46,058. Males had a median income of $28,333 versus $20,625 for females. The per capita income for the township was $15,313. About 2.2% of families and 7.3% of the population were below the poverty line, including none of those under the age of eighteen or sixty-five or over.
