= Basilica of Saint Mary (Minneapolis) =

Historic church in Minnesota, United States

- The Basilica of Saint Mary
- U.S. National Register of Historic Places
- Minneapolis Landmark
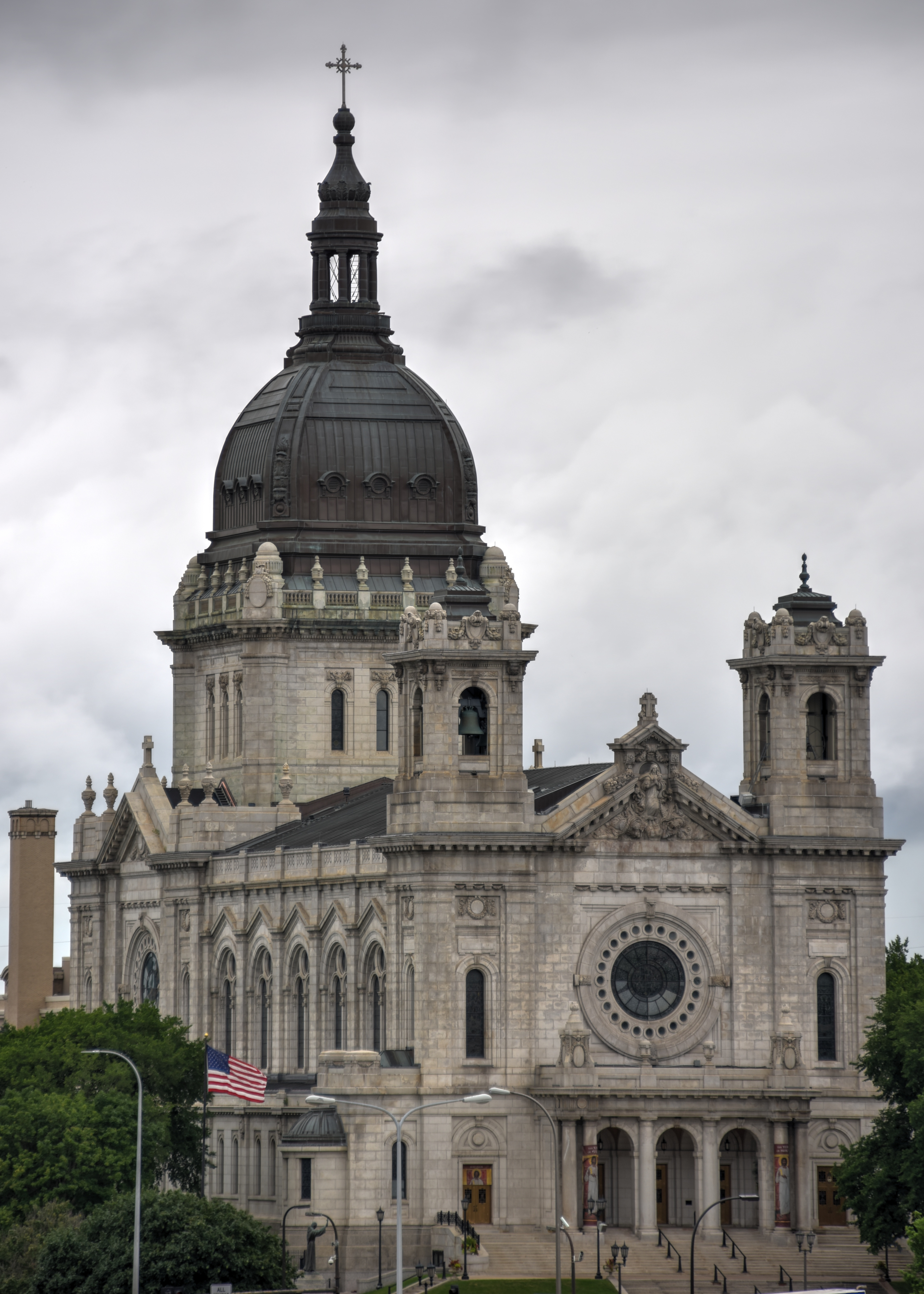
- The Basilica of Saint Mary in 2016

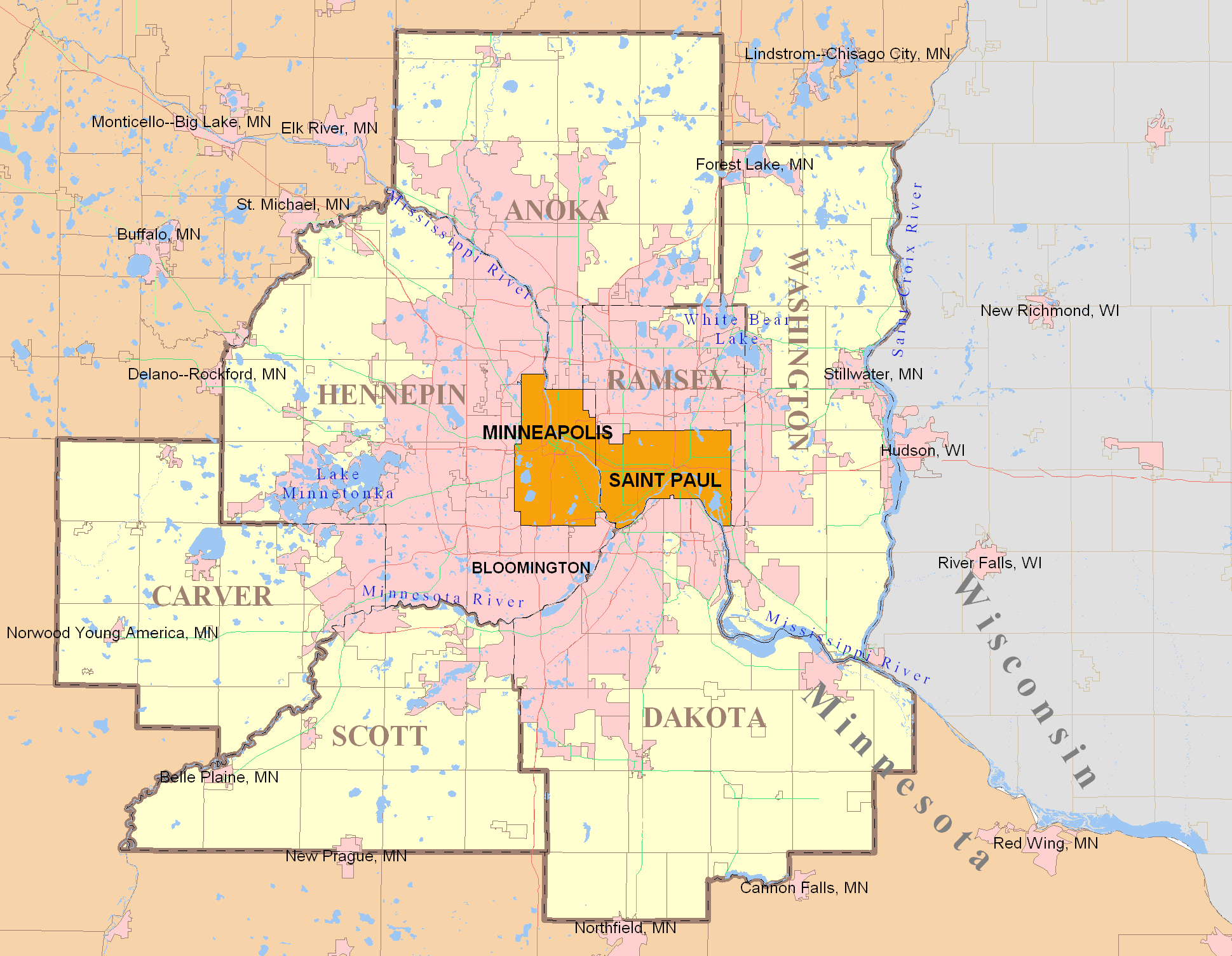
- Location within Minneapolis–Saint Paul Location within Minnesota Location within the United States
- Location: 1600 Hennepin Ave. Minneapolis, Minnesota
- Coordinates: 44°58′23″N 93°17′11″W
- Area: 2.5 acres (1.0 ha)
- Built: 1907–1914
- Architect: Masqueray, E.L.
- Architectural style: Classical Revival
- NRHP reference No.: 75000985

Significant dates
- Added to NRHP: March 26, 1975
- Designated MPLSL: 1986

The Basilica of Saint Mary is a Catholic minor basilica and co-cathedral located on Hennepin Avenue between 16th and 17th Streets in downtown Minneapolis, Minnesota, in the United States. Dedicated in 1913, Saint Mary became the first American basilica when Pope Pius XI raised it to the status in 1926. The Basilica of Saint Mary is the co-cathedral for the Archdiocese of Saint Paul and Minneapolis.

== History ==
=== Church of the Immaculate Conception ===
The predecessor to the Basilica of Saint Mary was the Church of the Immaculate Conception. It was dedicated in 1871 on 3rd Street and 3rd Avenue North in Minneapolis. At that time, Minneapolis was part of the Diocese of Saint Paul and the cathedral for the diocese was the third Cathedral of Saint Paul in St. Paul.

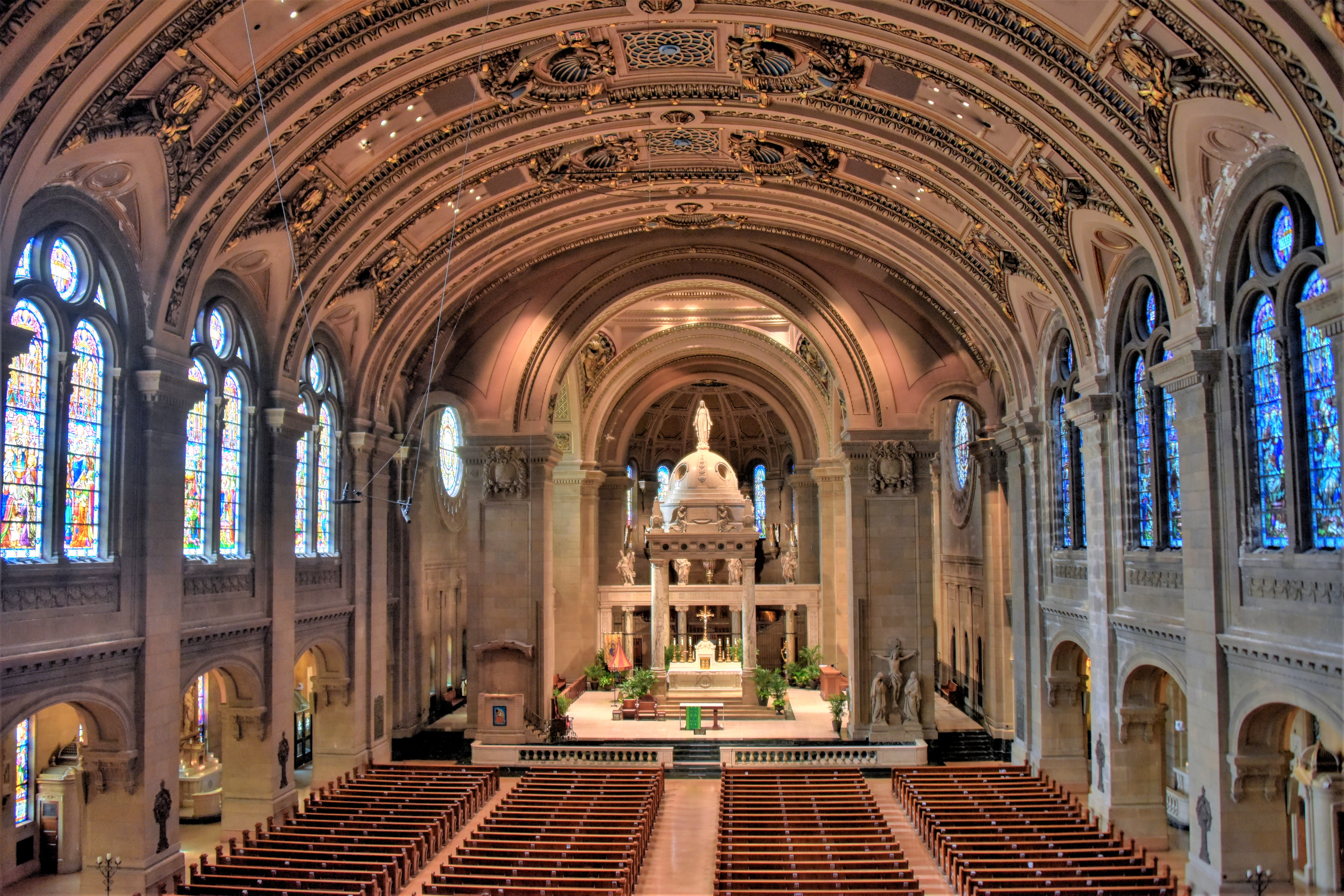
Nave and altar

By the beginning of the 20th century, the Church of Immaculate Conception was surrounded by warehouses. Given the increasing population of Minneapolis, Archbishop John Ireland of what is now the Archdiocese of Saint Paul, announced plans in 1903 for the Pro-Cathedral of Saint Mary. It would replace the Immaculate Conception Church and be in a different location. Technically, the official name of the new structure was Immaculate Conception Church, but the archdiocese called it the Pro-Cathedral of Saint Mary from the beginning. The next year, Ireland also announced plans to replace the Cathedral of Saint Paul with a larger building.

In 1905, the department store owner Lawrence S. Donaldson donated a one-block land parcel on Hennepin Avenue near Loring Park in Minneapolis to the archdiocese for the new pro-cathedral. Ireland awarded the design contract for St. Mary's to the Franco-American architect Emmanuel Louis Masqueray, who was also designing the new Cathedral of Saint Paul. Masqueray used a Beaux-Arts style for the pro-cathedral.

The groundbreaking for the Pro-Cathedral of Saint Mary was held on August 7, 1907, with foundation construction continuing through May 1908. The cornerstone for the new pro-cathedral was laid on May 31, 1908; the ceremony included 30,000 participants, 20 bishops, 300 priests and seminarians from the Saint Paul Seminary, and 500 cadets from the College of Saint Thomas in St. Paul.

As construction on St. Mary's and the Cathedral of Saint Paul progressed, American Architect magazine commented on the two projects: "in extent and splendor they promise to surpass anything yet attempted in ecclesiastical work in the United States."

=== Pro-Cathedral of Saint Mary ===
The first mass celebrated in the Pro-Cathedral of Saint Mary was on May 31, 1914. The interior decoration, windows, and plaster work were delayed due to the American entry into World War I in 1917. The structure was dedicated in 1921. After the interior was finally completed in 1925, it was formally named the Pro-cathedral of Saint Mary.

=== Basilica of Saint Mary of Minneapolis ===
The Pro-Cathedral of Saint Mary was established as a minor basilica by Pope Pius XI in 1926, making it the first basilica in the United States. In 1941, the basilica was formally consecrated by Archbishop Dennis Dougherty of Philadelphia as part of the Ninth National Eucharistic Congress in Minneapolis and St Paul.

=== Basilica Co-Cathedral of Saint Mary ===
Pope Paul VI changed the Archdiocese of Saint Paul to the Archdiocese of Saint Paul and Minneapolis in 1966. At this point, the Basilica of Saint Mary officially became the Basilica Co-Cathedral of Saint Mary.

The basilica was added to the National Register of Historic Places in 1975. Its significance was due to three reasons: its excellent architecture and engineering design, as an expression of Baroque influence in church architecture; an example of the history of religious movements in Minnesota; and its place as the first basilica in the United States.

In 1991, the archdiocese replaced the copper roof on St Mary's, fixing the water leaks that had been damaging the building due to deferred maintenance. In 2011, the basilica was the recipient of a $100,000 preservation grant from Partners in Preservation, chosen through a public vote. The archdiocese used the funds to repair the narthex and sacristy of the basilica, and help restore the paint and gold leaf found throughout the structure.

In 2020, the basilica received minor fire damage during the protests over the murder of George Floyd that year. Two pews were splashed with flammable liquid and set on fire. The archdiocese in April 2026 began a $45 million restoration of the main worship area of the basilica that would limit its use for the next 12 months. The plan included the replastering of walls, the restoration of all the pews and the cleaning of bricks and stained glass windows.

== Basilica exterior ==
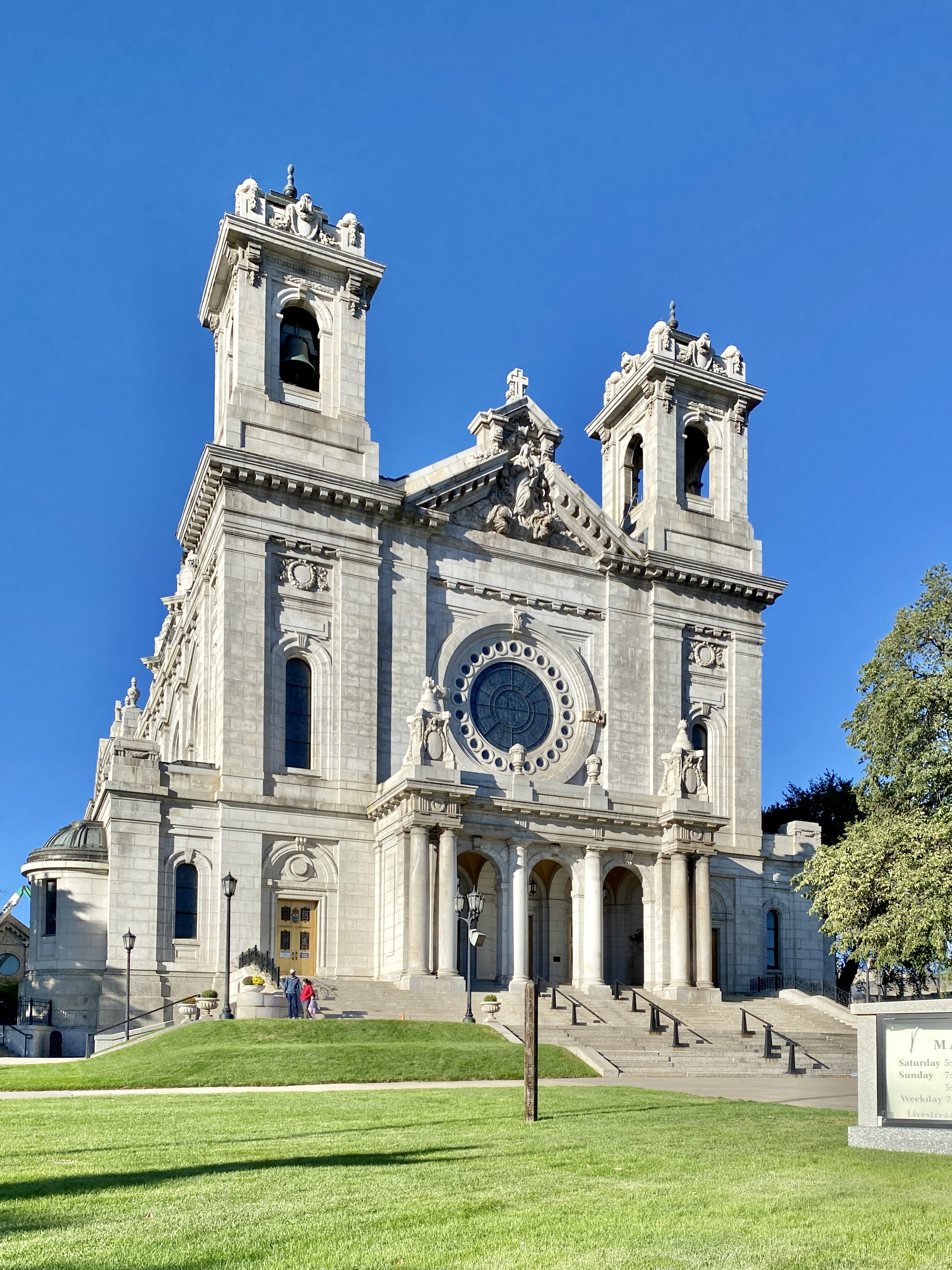
Basilica of Saint Mary (2021)

The foundation of the basilica is composed of Rockville granite. The walls are built of white Vermont granite, with a height of 70 feet (21 m) from the floor to the eave-line. The main entrance is a colonnaded portico with two 116-foot (35 m) spires on each side.

The cathedral campus is home to the Homeless Jesus sculpture. It is a bronze rendition of Jesus curled up on a park bench, covered by a blanket. Created by the Canadian sculptor Timothy P. Schmalz, the artwork was installed in November 2017 on the World Day of the Poor.

== Basilica interior ==
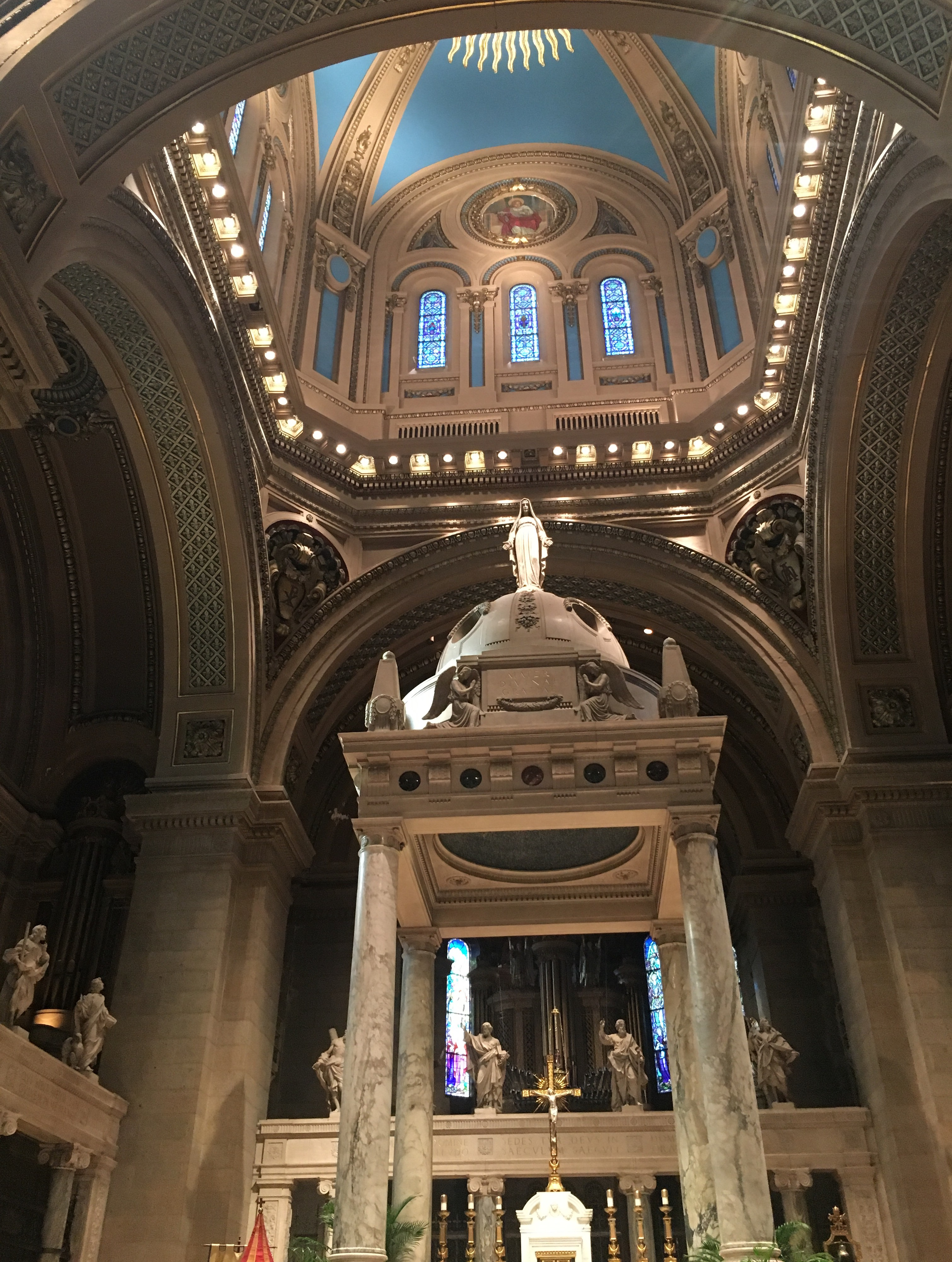
Domed ceiling above the altar (2016)

=== Nave ===
The nave of the basilica is lighted by five large arched stained glass windows. It has a barrel vault that is 82 feet (25 m) high, exceeding St. Peter's Basilica in Rome by 2 feet (0.61 m). The marble altar is located underneath a 50-foot-high (15 m) marble-columned baldacchino. The seating capacity is 1,600 in the pews.

=== Dome ===
The sanctuary, at the north end of the nave, is topped with a grand dome measuring 40 square feet (3.7 m^{2}) at the base and rising 138 feet (42 m) above the floor. On the exterior, the dome has a flèche, or lantern, topped with a bronze cross. The cross is 62 feet (19 m) in height. The flèche and cross give the dome a total height 200 feet (61 m).

== Chapels and shrines ==
The basilica has nine shrines, or side altars.

- Shrine of Saint Anthony of Padua (2017)
- Shrine of Saint Thérèse of Lisieux (2017)
- Our Lady of Guadalupe Chapel
- Our Lady of Lavang Shrine
- Our Lady of the Immaculate Conception Shrine
- Shrine of Saint Anne, Mother of Mary
- Shrine of Saint Anthony
- Shrine of Saint Joseph
- Shrine of Saint Thérèse of Lisieux

== Music ==
=== Choirs ===
The Basilica Cathedral Choir, a 90-voice auditioned, volunteer choir, provides choral music on Sunday mass and on the Holy Days of Obligation. The choir repertoire spans multiple genres and time periods. The Schola Cantorum, a 12-voice professional choir, sings for vespers, confirmations, and special services.

=== Wicks pipe organ ===
The basilica pipe organ, Wicks Opus No. 3047, was installed in 1949 and dedicated in 1950. It was constructed by the Wicks Organ Company of Highland, Illinois. The instrument includes several stops that were scaled and designed by Henry Vincent Willis IV of England. The pipe organ underwent a complete renovation in 2008, including the addition of a new relay and console. The pipe now consists of 82 ranks on four manuals and pedal. The en-chamade herald trumpet is actually tuba-scale; it is modeled after the English town hall Willis tubas. Voiced on 25" wind, it is the most commanding such stop in the Upper Midwest.

== Gallery ==
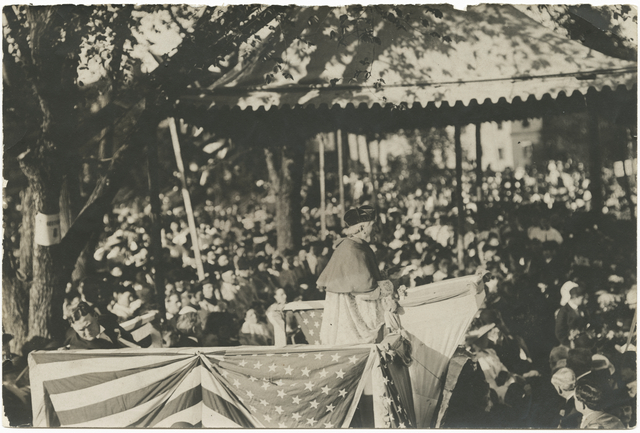
John Ireland speaking at the groundbreaking ceremony (1907)

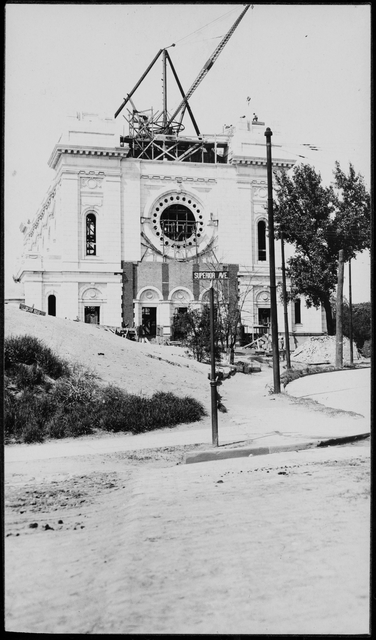
St. Mary's Basilica under construction (1911)

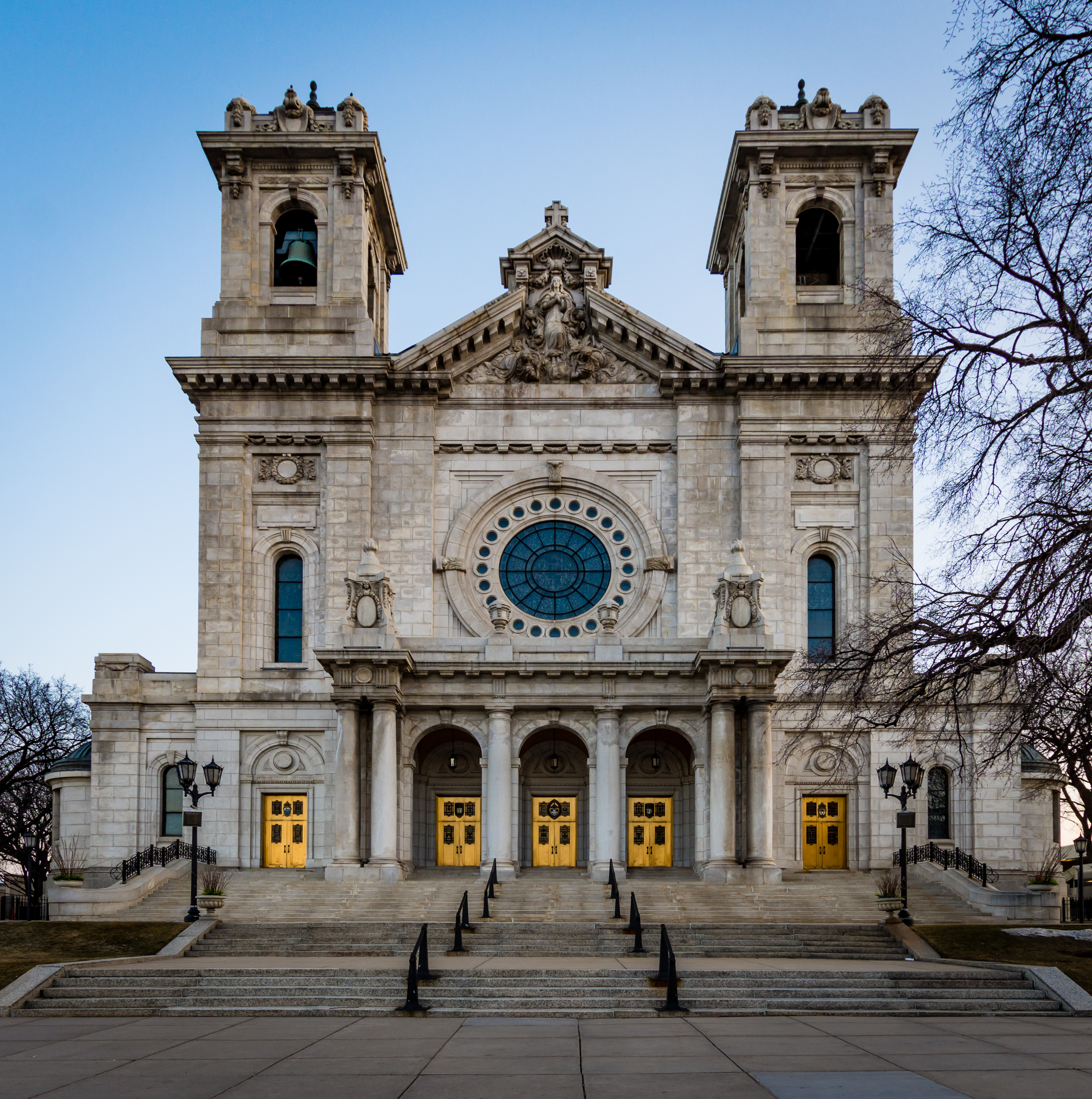
Front entrance (2018)

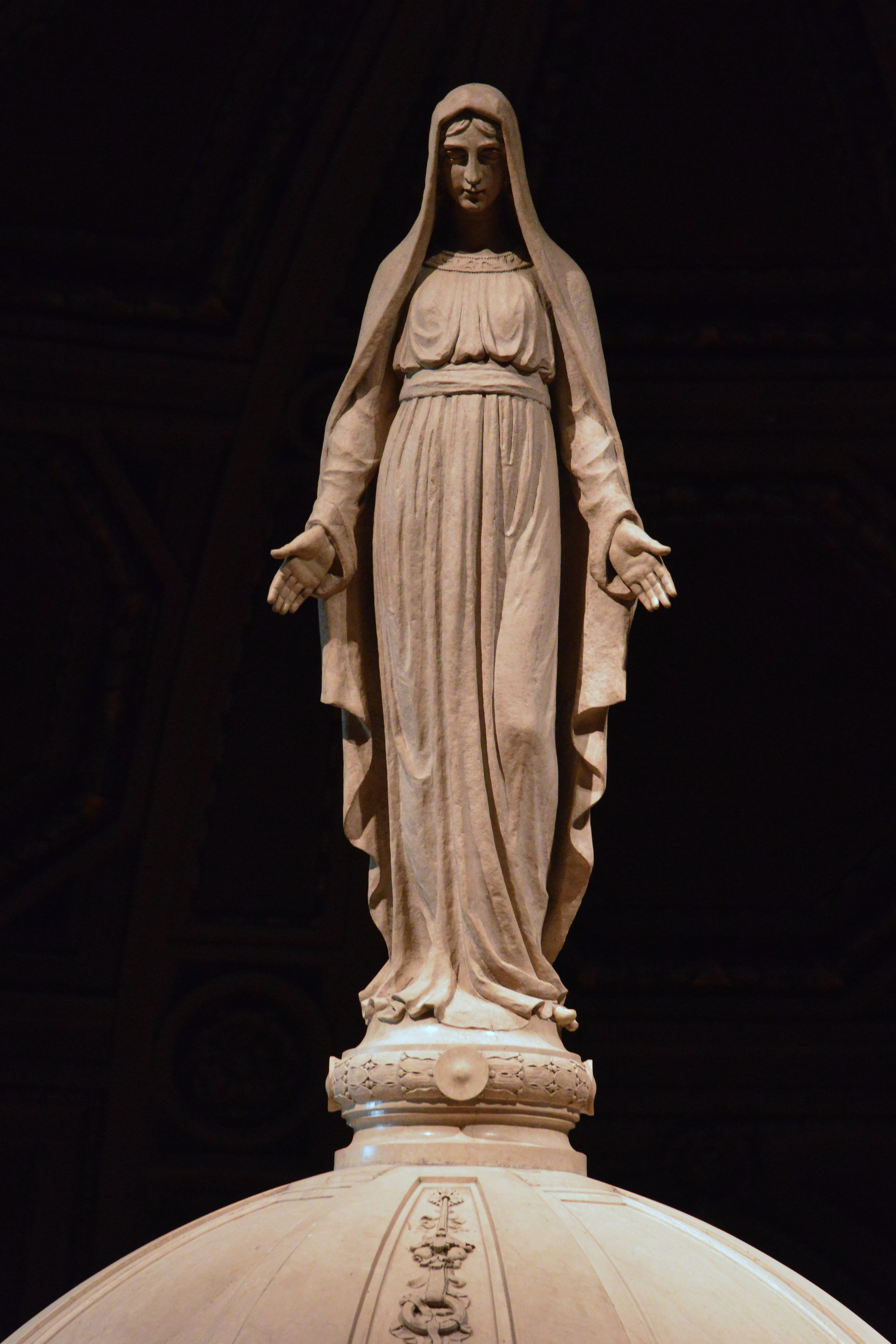
Statue of Virgin Mary on baldachin (2017)

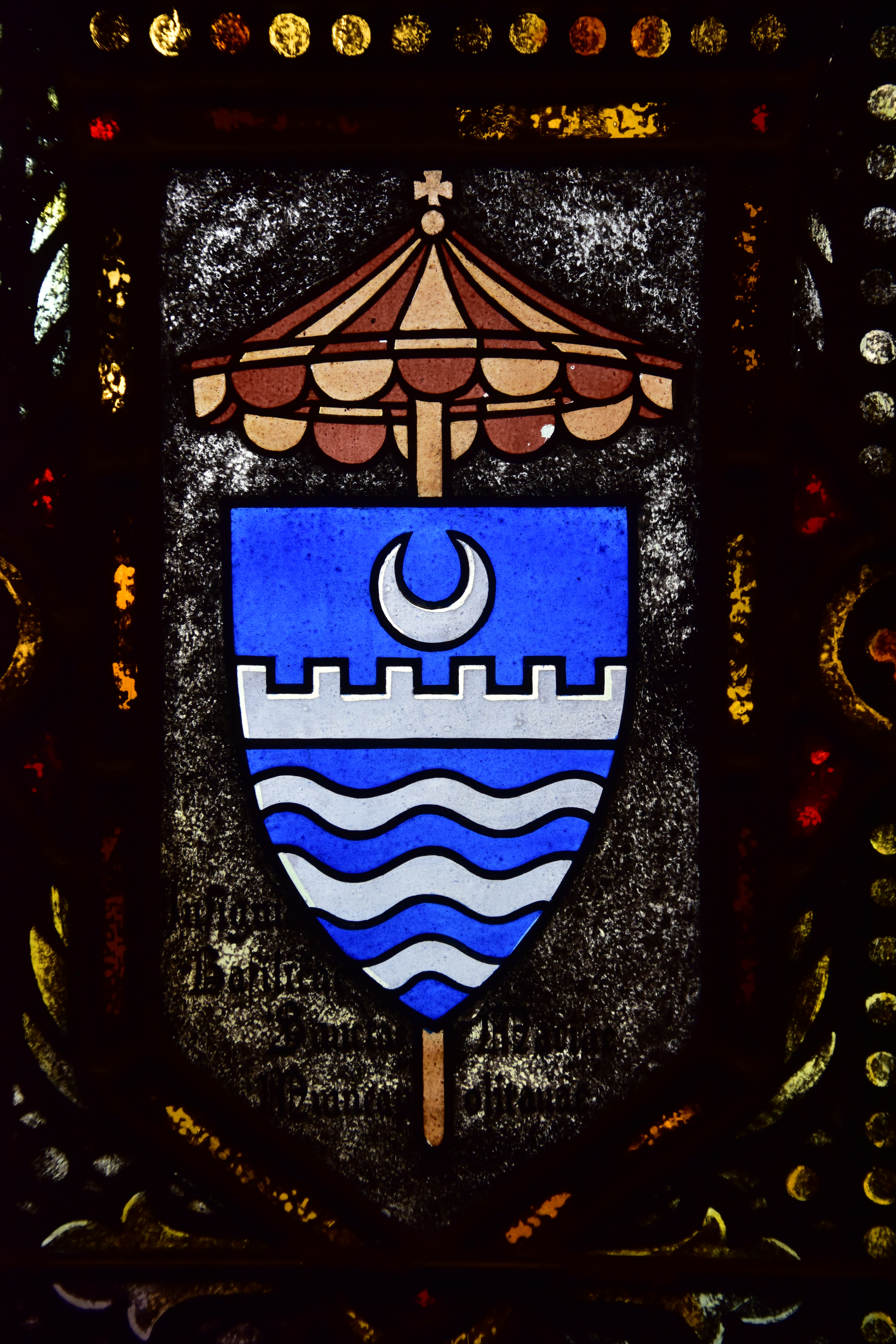
Basilica coat of arms in stained glass (2017)

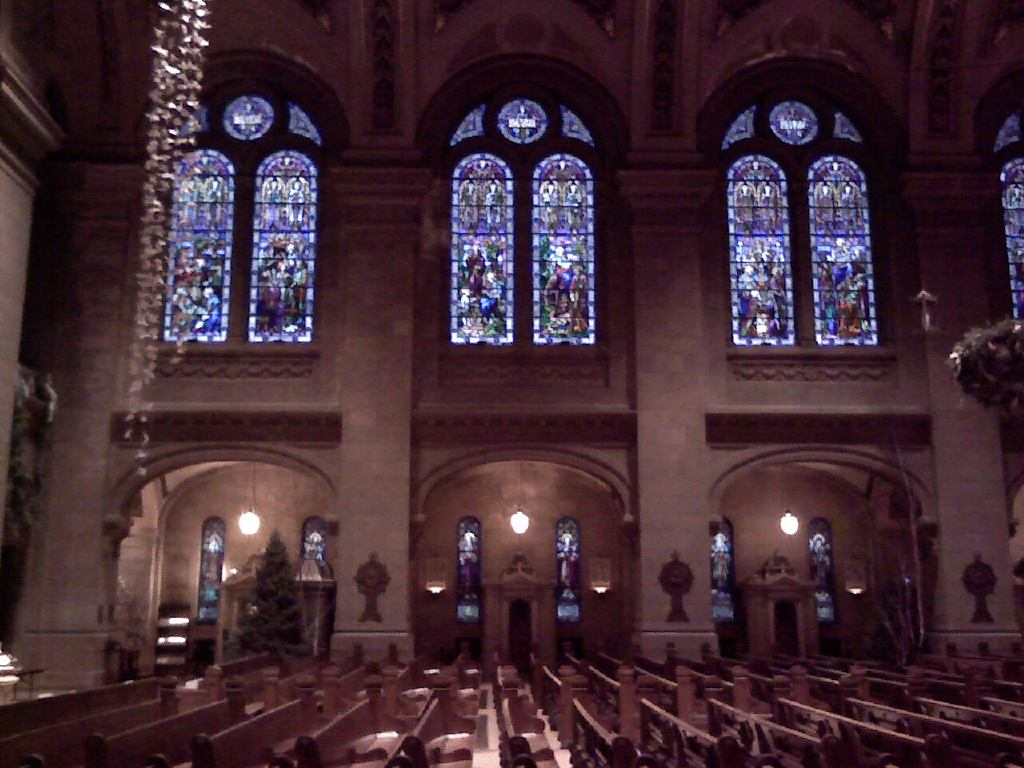
Stained glass windows (2006)
