= Emmanuel Louis Masqueray =

American architect

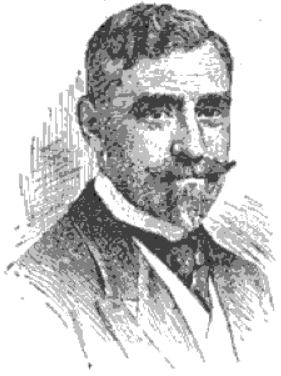
- Born: September 10, 1861; Dieppe, France
- Died: May 26, 1917 (aged 55); St. Paul, Minnesota, US
- Occupations: Architect, educator

Emmanuel Louis Masqueray (1861–1917) was a Franco-American preeminent figure in the history of American architecture, both as a designer of landmark buildings and as an influential teacher of the profession of architecture dedicated to the principles of Beaux-Arts architecture.

== Early life and education ==
He was born in Dieppe, France, on September 10, 1861 to Charles-Emmanuel and Henriette-Marie-Louise Masqueray, née de Lamare. He was educated in Rouen and Paris. Having decided to become an architect, he studied at the École des Beaux Arts, Paris, as a pupil of Charles Laisné and Léon Ginain, and was awarded the Deschaumes Prize by the Institute of France. He also received the Chandesaigues Prize. While in Paris, he also served on the Commission des Monuments Historiques.

== Career ==
Masqueray was a charter member of the Society of Beaux-Arts Architects, now the Van Alen Institute, the Architectural League of New York, the New York Chapter of the American Institute of Architects, and the national organization.

He came to the United States in 1887 to work for the firm of Carrère and Hastings in New York City; both John Mervin Carrère (November 9, 1858 – March 1, 1911) and Thomas Hastings (1860–1929) had been fellow students with Masqueray at the École des Beaux Arts. While in their employ, Masqueray created the watercolor elevation of the Ponce de Leon Hotel in St. Augustine, Florida. Other important work on the boards during his time with the firm included the Hotel Alcazar, St. Augustine, Florida, 1887, now the Lightner Museum, The Commonwealth Club, Richmond, Virginia, 1891, and the Edison Building, New York City, 1891 (razed). Five years later, he joined the office of Richard Morris Hunt (1827–1895), the first American architect to attend the École des Beaux Arts; in Hunt's firm he helped design many notable buildings including the Elbridge Gerry residence in Marblehead, MA, the William Astor house on Fifth Avenue in New York City, and Ochre Court in Newport, Rhode Island. It is likely that he made major contributions to the design of the Metropolitan Museum of Art in New York City. He also contributed to the design of The Breakers for Cornelius Vanderbilt II in Newport, Rhode Island.

In 1893, Masqueray opened the Atelier Masqueray for the study of architecture according to French methods; architect Walter B. Chambers shared in this enterprise. Located at 123 E. 23rd Street, this was the first wholly independent atelier opened in the United States. A colorful, dynamic teacher, Masqueray pleaded with his students to make things simple. Beginning in 1899, Masqueray made special provision for women to number among his architectural students by establishing a second atelier especially for women at 37–40 West 22nd Street in New York. As was said at the time, "...he has unbounded faith in women's ability to succeed in architecture...provided they go about it seriously."

== Death ==
Masqueray died in St. Paul, Minnesota, on May 26, 1917, and was buried in Calvary Cemetery in St. Paul.

According to contemporary published accounts of his exhibitions, his notable students included:

- Paul R. Allen (architect of Henry Miller's Theatre, NYC)
- Guy Bolton (Broadway impresario)
- Lester A. Cramer (later practiced in Los Angeles; architect of the Rosicrucian Fellowship Temple and the Sanatorium^{[}at Mount Ecclesia)
- Leon N. Gillette (of the NYC firm Walker & Gillette)
- James Hopkins (of the Boston architectural firm of Kilham and Hopkins)
- Henry Murphy (architectural advisor to China)
- Carl Richardson
- Isabel Roberts (of the Oak Park studio of Frank Lloyd Wright)
- Leonard B. Schultze (architect of the Waldorf-Astoria Hotel see Schultze and Weaver)
- William Van Alen (architect of the Chrysler Building)

In 1897, Masqueray left the Hunt office to work for Warren & Wetmore, also in New York City, Whitney Warren having been his fellow student at the École des Beaux Arts, Paris. Work underway while Masqueray was with the firm includes: New York Yacht Club (1898), Westmorly, Harvard, MA (1898), High Tide (William Starr Miller house), 79 Ocean Avenue, Newport, Rhode Island,(1900), The Racquet House at Tuxedo Club, Tuxedo Park, NY, (1890-1900), and the Mrs. Orme Wilson residence (now the India Consulate), 3 East 64th St., New York (1900–03). He was responsible for the design of the Long Island College Hospital in Brooklyn.

=== St. Louis ===
His reputation became international in 1901 when the commissioner of architects of the St. Louis Exposition selected him to be Chief of Design. Masqueray in turn employed Louis C. Spiering (a fellow alumnus of the École des Beaux-Arts) and some of his former students including Frank Swales and George Nagle. As Chief of Design of the Louisiana Purchase Exposition, a position he held for three years, Masqueray had architectural oversight of the entire Fair and personally designed the following Fair buildings:

- Palace of Agriculture
- The Cascades and Colonnades
- Palace of Forestry, Fish, and Game
- Palace of Horticulture
- Palace of Transportation

Design ideas from all of these were widely emulated in civic projects across the United States as part of the City Beautiful Movement. Masqueray resigned shortly after the fair opened in 1904, having been invited by Archbishop John Ireland of St. Paul to come to Minnesota and design the new Cathedral of Saint Paul in Saint Paul for the city.

=== Minnesota ===
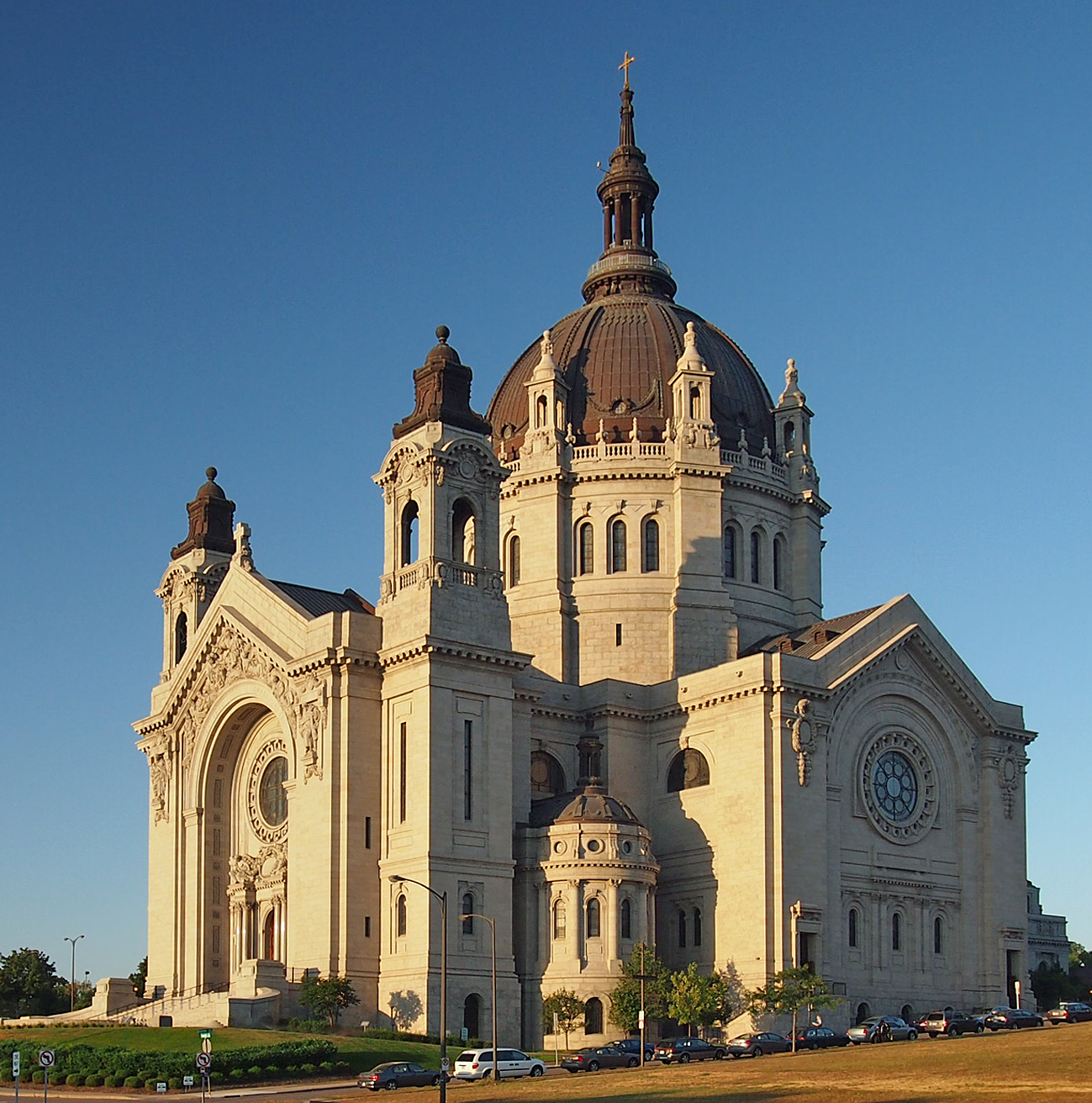
Cathedral of Saint Paul in St. Paul, Minnesota

Masqueray arrived in St. Paul in 1905 and remained there until his death. He designed about two dozen parish churches for Catholic and Protestant congregations in the upper Midwest, including:

- Cathedral of Saint Paul, St. Paul (1904)
- Basilica of Saint Mary, Minneapolis (1908)
- Incarnation Catholic Church, Minneapolis (1909)
- St. Paul's-on-the-Hill Episcopal Church, St. Paul (1912)
- Bethlehem Lutheran Church, 655 Forest Street, St. Paul
- Chapel of St. Thomas Aquinas, 121 Cleveland Ave., St. Paul (1918)

Masqueray designed several small churches in what is now the Diocese of New Ulm.

- The Church of the Holy Redeemer (1915), Marshall
- Church of St. Peter (1911), St. Peter. This church was destroyed by the 1998 Comfrey–St. Peter tornado outbreak; a new church-school complex was built at a new location west of the city at 1801 West Broadway. The St. Peter Community Center and Public Library occupy the site of the former church.
- Church of St. Edward, Minneota
- Church of St. Francis Xavier (1917), Benson

Masqueray also designed important residences in and around St. Paul (one of which, a 1915 home at 427 Portland Avenue, has been owned by radio personality Garrison Keillor) and "Wind's Eye" in Dellwood MN; several parochial schools for the Catholic Archdiocese of St. Paul; Ireland Hall (1912) at the College of Thomas (now University of St. Thomas).

In St. Paul in 1906, Masqueray founded an atelier which continued his Beaux Arts method of architectural training, among his students who trained there, perhaps the best known is Edwin Lundie (1886–1972). Other architects associated with Masqueray in St. Paul were Fred Slifer and Frank Abrahamson.

=== Iowa ===
In the Archdiocese of Dubuque in Iowa:

- Keane Hall at Loras College, Dubuque (1913)
- St. Patrick's Church, Cedar Falls (1914)
- Immaculate Conception Church, Cedar Rapids (1914)

=== Wisconsin ===
- St. Anne, Somerset

=== Other works ===
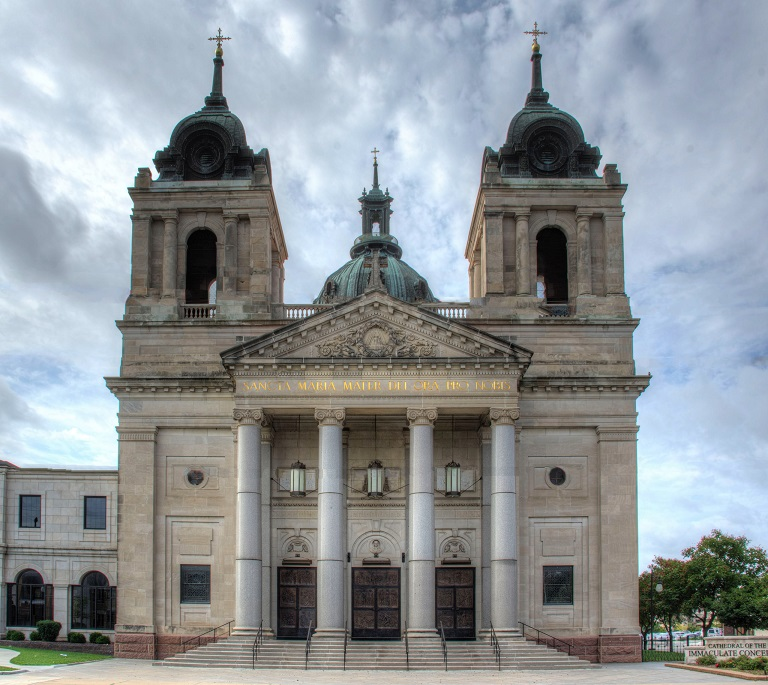
Cathedral of the Immaculate Conception in Wichita, Kansas

Masqueray designed three more cathedrals, of which two were built:

- Cathedral of the Immaculate Conception, Wichita, Kansas (1912)
- St. Joseph Cathedral, Sioux Falls, South Dakota (1919)

He also designed the planned new city of Twin Falls, Idaho.

== See also ==
- French language in Minnesota
