= Church of the Incarnation (Minneapolis, Minnesota) =

Coordinates: 44.93367°N 93.28260°W

- U.S. National Register of Historic Places
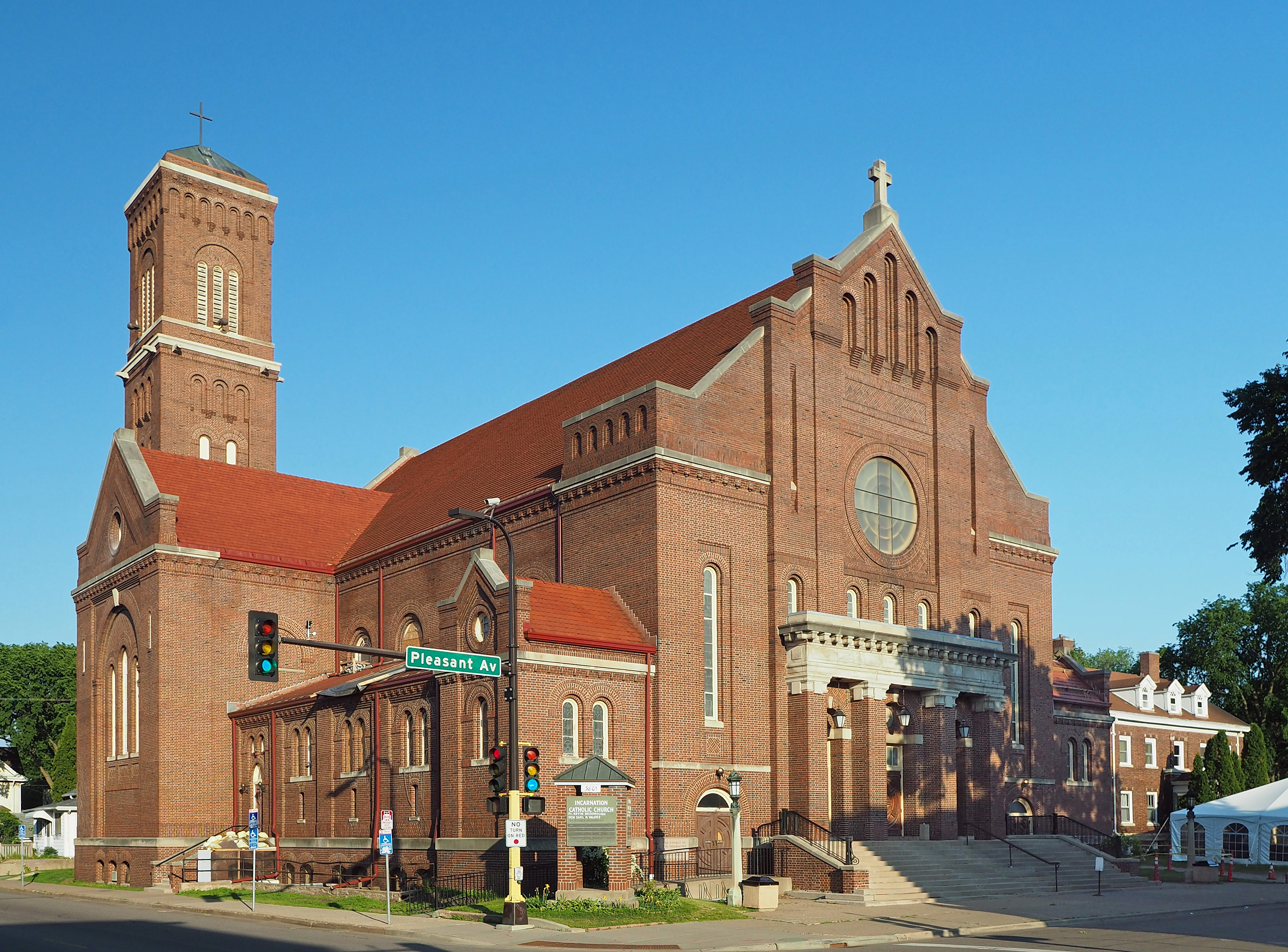

- Location within Minnesota Location within the United States
- Location: 3801 Pleasant Ave. S., Minneapolis, MN
- Area: 0.92 acres (0.37 ha)
- Built: 1918
- Built by: H. N. Leighton Company (church); Raidt, F. H. (rectory)
- Architects: Emmanuel Louis Masqueray (church); Bertrand, George Emile and Chamberlin, Arthur B. (rectory)
- Architectural style: Late 19th and 20th Century Revivals/Other: Romanesque and Italian Renaissance Revival; Late 19th and 20th Century Revivals: Colonial Revival
- Website: https://www.incarnationmpls.org/
- NRHP reference No.: 100007352
- Added to NRHP: January 11, 2022

The Church of the Incarnation in Minneapolis, Minnesota is a Catholic church listed on the National Register of Historic Places for its architecture. It was designed by French architect Emmanuel Louis Masqueray, who also designed the Cathedral of Saint Paul and the Basilica of Saint Mary in Minneapolis. Its design combines elements of the Colonial Revival, Romanesque Revival, and Italian Renaissance Revival styles. The church was listed on the National Register in 2022.

At the turn of the 20th century, Minneapolis was in a period of rapid growth. The population grew from 202,718 in 1900 to 380,000 in 1920. The area between Lake Street and 40th Street was largely built between 1903 and 1914 with Colonial Revival houses and Craftsman bungalows. After World War I, the area south of 40th Street and north of Minnehaha Creek was developed. To meet the population's needs, Archbishop John Ireland authorized construction of a new parish in 1909. It was the first Catholic parish south of Lake Street. The area around 38th Street and Pleasant Avenue was sparsely populated at the time; at least a portion of the area was occupied by a corn field. The congregation initially worshipped at the Ark Lodge Masonic Temple while the first buildings were built. The first building was intended to house the school, with an auditorium that would serve temporarily as worship space while the main church was built. After that, a rectory was designed by local architects George Bertrand and Arthur Chamberlin and built in 1913. The first pastor, Father James Matthew Cleary, was very popular; the Masonic Temple was filled to its capacity of 500 for both Sunday masses. The parochial school was also popular, having to turn away 200 prospective students in 1913. As the parish expanded, the need for a permanent church building increased, so John Ireland hired Emmanuel Louis Masqueray to design the building.
