= Cathedral of Saint Paul (Minnesota) =

Historic church in Minnesota, United States

- National Shrine of the Apostle Paul
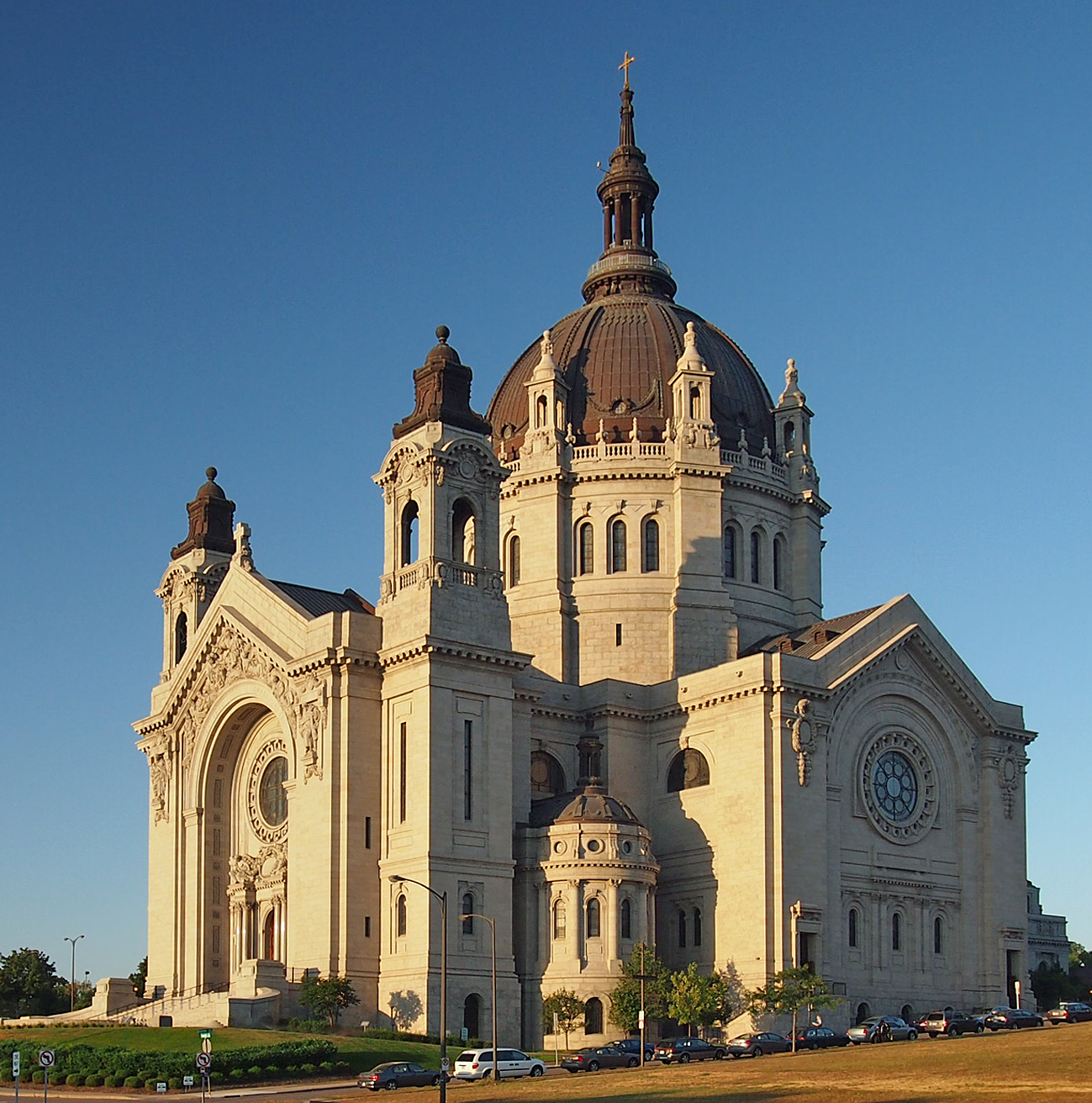
- Cathedral of Saint Paul
- 44°56′49″N 93°06′32″W
- Location: 239 Selby Ave, Saint Paul, Minnesota
- Country: United States
- Denomination: Catholic Church
- Sui iuris church: Latin Church
- Website: cathedralsaintpaul.org

History
- Status: Cathedral, national shrine
- Consecrated: 1958

Architecture
- Functional status: Active
- Previous cathedrals: First; Second; Third
- Architect: Emmanuel Louis Masqueray
- Style: Beaux-Arts architecture
- Years built: 1906–1915

Specifications
- Capacity: 3,000
- Length: 307 feet (94 m)
- Width: 216 feet (66 m)
- Height: 306.5 feet (93.4 m)

Clergy
- Archbishop: Bernard Hebda
- Rector: Joseph Johnson
- St. Paul Cathedral-Catholic
- U.S. National Register of Historic Places
- U.S. Historic district – Contributing property
- Built: 1906–1915
- Architects: Emmanuel Louis Masqueray; Whitney Warren
- Architectural style: Classical Revival
- Part of: Historic Hill District (ID76001067)
- NRHP reference No.: 74001039
- Added to NRHP: June 28, 1974

The Cathedral of Saint Paul is a Catholic cathedral in Saint Paul, Minnesota. It is the co-cathedral of the Archdiocese of Saint Paul and Minneapolis, along with the Basilica of Saint Mary in Minneapolis. It sits on Cathedral Hill overlooking downtown Saint Paul and features a distinctive copper-clad dome. It is dedicated to Paul the Apostle, who is also the namesake of the city. The current building opened in 1915 as the fourth cathedral of the archdiocese to bear this name. On March 25, 2009, it was designated as the National Shrine of the Apostle Paul by the United States Conference of Catholic Bishops. It is one of the largest Catholic cathedrals in the United States.

== History ==
=== Background ===
The first church building in what became the Archdiocese of Saint Paul and Minneapolis was a small log chapel built at the urging of Father Lucien Galtier. He came to the area when the settlement was still known as "Pig's Eye" (after Pierre "Pig's Eye" Parrant). The chapel, measuring 25 feet (7.6 m) by 18 feet (5.5 m), was dedicated on November 1, 1841. Father Augustin Ravoux later enlarged the structure, and when Joseph Crétin was appointed as the bishop of the newly established Diocese of St. Paul in July 1851, the log chapel became the first cathedral. Crétin immediately started to build a larger church to serve the fast-growing population of St. Paul. The second church building had three stories, with a library, kitchen, and school facilities on the first floor; the church itself on the second floor; and offices and living quarters for Crétin and his staff. The second building still proved to be too small for the needs of the diocese, so he started plans for a third cathedral in 1853. Construction of the building, at the corner of St. Peter and Sixth Streets in Downtown St. Paul, started in 1854 and was completed in 1858, having been delayed by the Panic of 1857 and Crétin's death. The third cathedral was built of stone, measured 175 feet (53 m) long and 100 feet (30 m) wide, but had practically no ornamentation in an effort to cut costs. Thomas Grace was the bishop at the time the cathedral was completed. The third cathedral rapidly became outdated with the rapid growth of Catholics in the area.

=== Planning ===
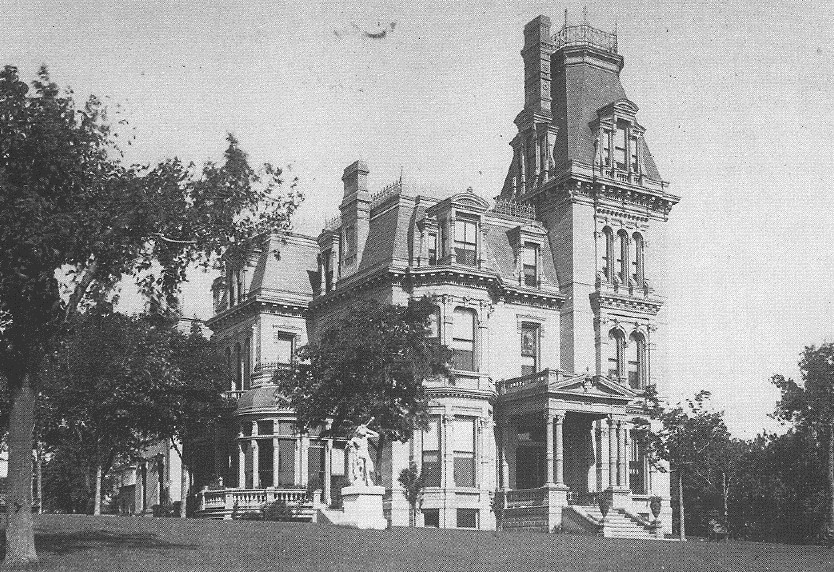
The Kittson mansion, demolished to make way for the cathedral

When the Diocese of Saint Paul was elevated to an archiepiscopal see in 1888, the necessity for a new cathedral became all the more apparent. A search began for a location for a new cathedral, outside of the business district of downtown St. Paul where the third cathedral resides. There was a desire for the cathedral to be built closer to Minneapolis, with sites being considered near the College of Saint Thomas, the Midway neighborhood, and at the intersection of Summit Avenue and Victoria Street. (Note: The current location of Mitchell Hamline School of Law.) On April 9, 1904, a property on the brow of St. Anthony Hill was purchased for $52,500 ($1.88 million in 2025). The location was occupied by the deteriorating mansion of entrepreneur Norman Kittson. The site was too small for the planned edifice, and so land south of Summit Avenue was purchased, requiring the movement of the street by 90 feet.

Fundraising began immediately, with pledges made by March 1906 totaling $435,200 ($15.6 million in 2025). Fundraising efforts included a picnic on the Minnesota State Fair grounds.

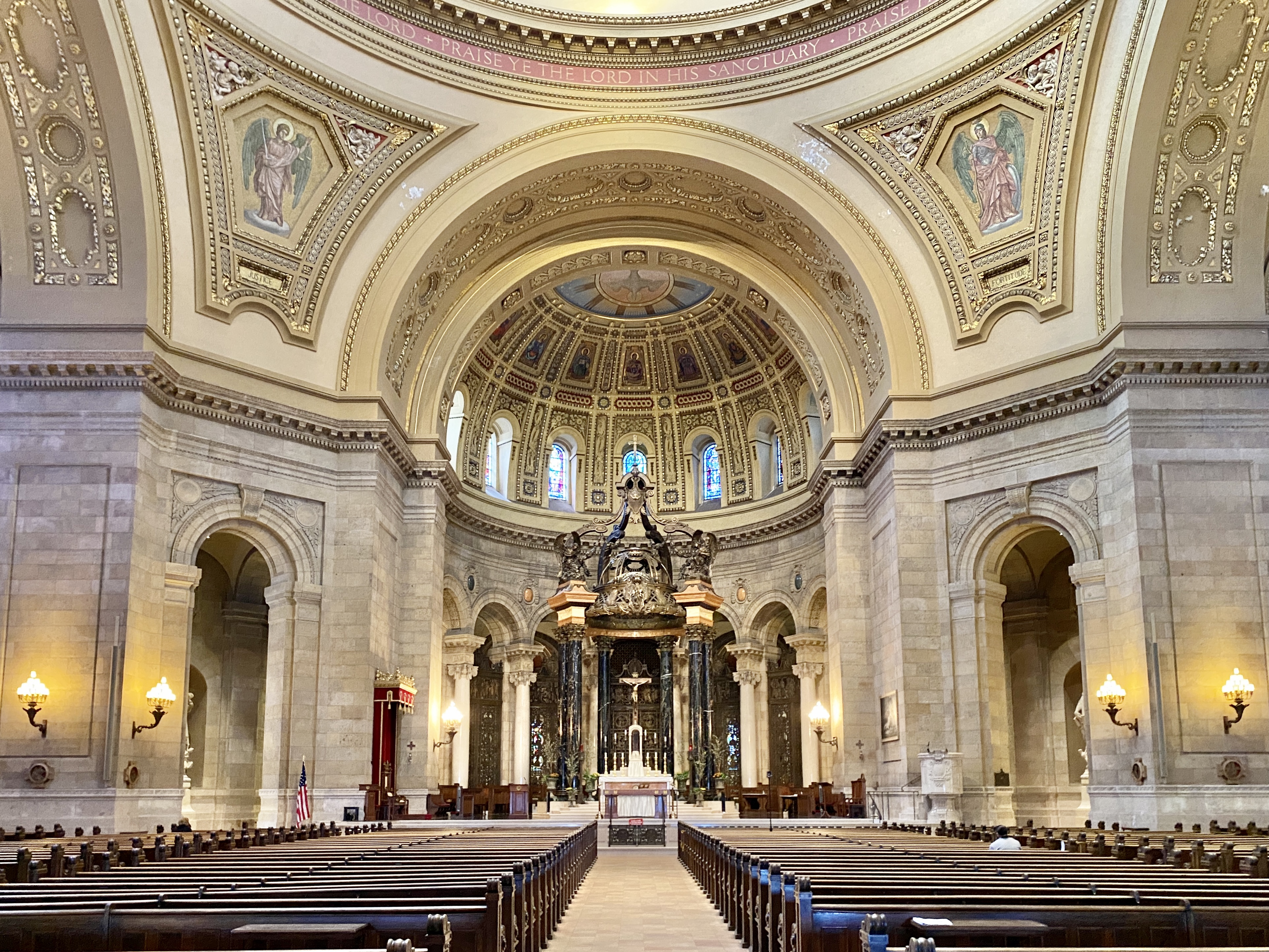
Interior of the cathedral

==== Architect ====
At John Ireland's direction, the archdiocese commissioned well-known French Beaux-Arts architect Emmanuel Louis Masqueray, who was also the chief architect of the 1904 World's Fair in St. Louis.

=== Construction ===
The cornerstone for the cathedral was laid on June 2, 1907. Within the cornerstone was placed a copper time capsule box containing contemporary newspapers, souvenirs, and a parchment written on in Latin describing the details of the ceremony. Pope Pius X and President Theodore Roosevelt sent congratulatory telegrams which were read aloud, and Mayor Robert A. Smith, Governor John Albert Johnson, and Senator Moses E. Clapp read speeches. The First Artillery of the Minnesota National Guard fired a salute, followed by the singing of the Te Deum by seminarians.

=== Dedication and consecration ===
The first Mass in the cathedral was held on March 15, 1915, Palm Sunday. While yet unfinished, the cathedral hosted over 2,500 people for the 6 a.m. Mass celebrated by Archbishop Ireland. The doors to the cathedral had been installed only the day before. Ornamentation was bare; there were no stained-glass windows, no baldachin, and no statues. Nonetheless, Masses were held on the hour from 6 a.m. to 10 a.m. and some 18,000 total were estimated to have attended that day. Ireland wept as he saw the crowds who attended. At the 10 a.m., which auxiliary bishop John Jeremiah Lawler celebrated, Ireland preached and called the new building a "a great, a noble edifice" and "supreme monument" to the faith of the people who had donated to build it. A formal dedication took place several weeks later on April 11.

The building was not considered substantially complete, and thus eligible for solemn consecration, until 1958. Archbishop William O. Brady consecrated the building on October 14, 1958, at 1:30 p.m., followed by a solemn high Mass at 5:15 p.m. Bishop Francis J. Schenk, at the time ordinary of the Diocese of Crookston and one-time rector of the cathedral, preached the sermon. The unconventional Tuesday date was chosen as there was a reunion the following day at the nearby Saint Paul Seminary.

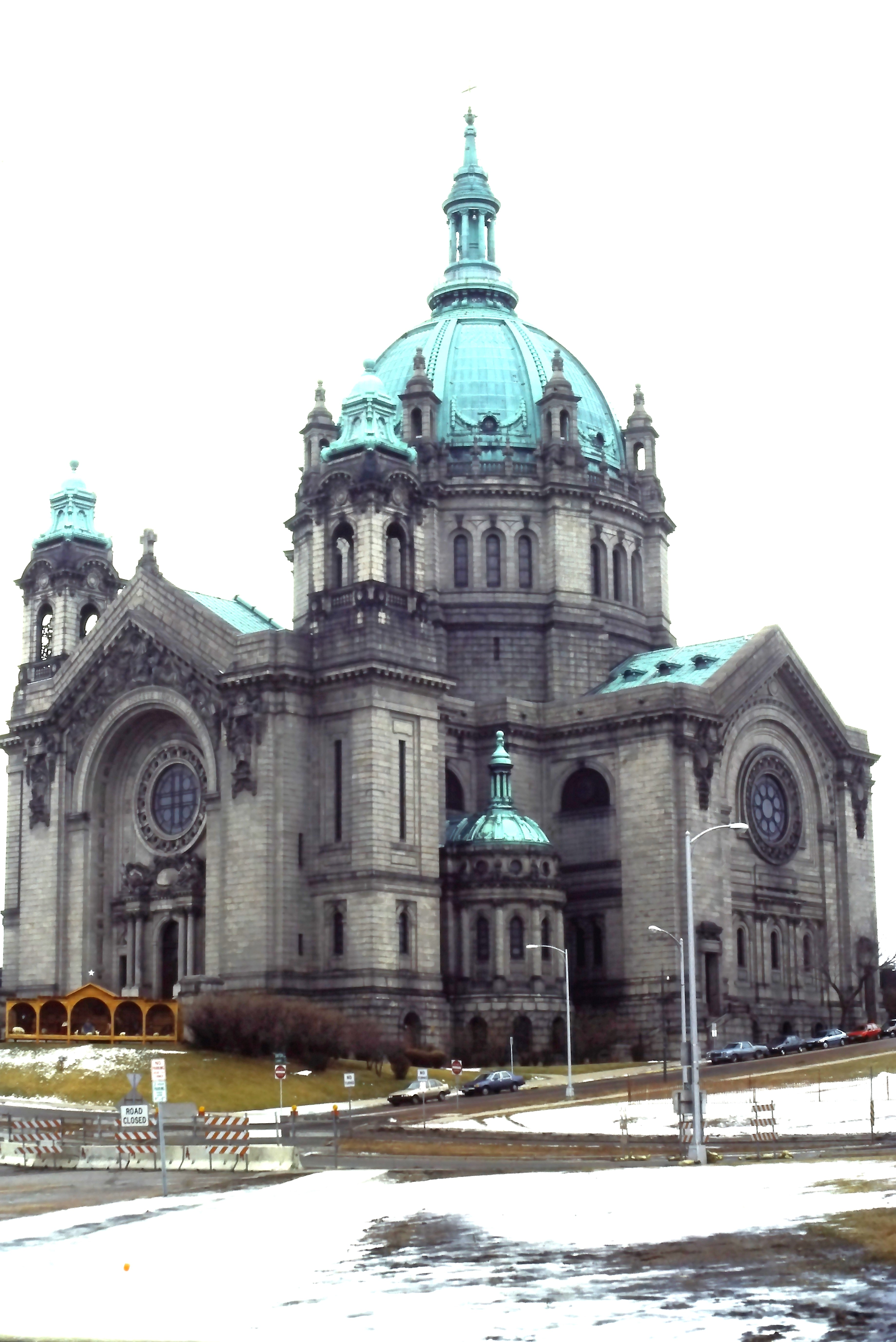
The original copper roof with green patina, replaced in 2002

=== Renovation ===
In 2001, construction began to completely replace the 60,000-square-foot copper roof to make it more weather-resistant. Forty-two miles of tuck pointing on the cathedral granite was done at the same time, as well as sand-blasting to clean the exterior. Water leaks had been threatening interior art. The 85-year-old roof had only been projected to last 50 years. The project was completed in 2002, at a cost of $32 million. The previously green patina became a brown.

== Structure ==
Masqueray's open design allows visitors unobstructed views of the altar and pulpit. Masqueray died in 1917, having completed only a few designs for the interior, which included three of the cathedral's major chapels: Saint Peter's, Saint Joseph's and the Blessed Virgin Mary's.

The building was added to the National Register of Historic Places in 1974. It is also a contributing property to the Historic Hill District.

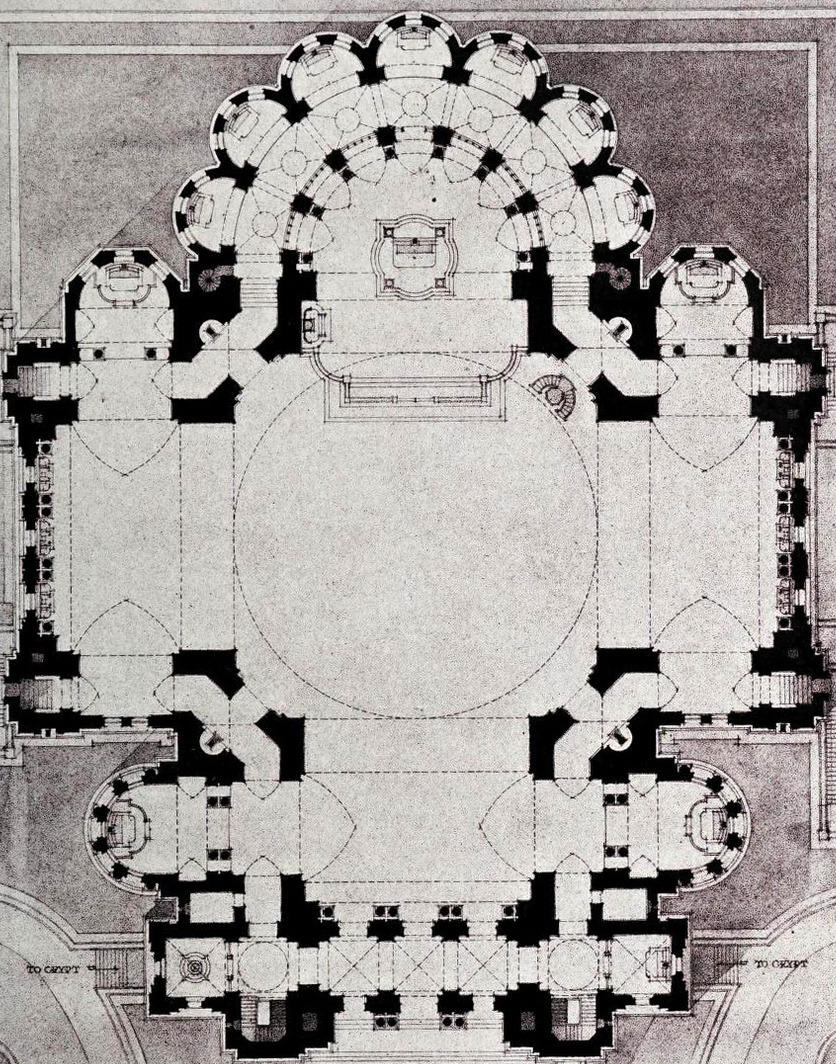
An early floor plan of the cathedral from 1908

=== Design ===
The cathedral is built in a "Classical Renaissance" architectural style, and is in a Greek Cross design. The dome of the cathedral is 76 feet (23 m) in diameter and 186 feet (57 m) high. Warm-colored paint and gold leaf were added during a major renovation of the dome in the 1950s. The exterior walls of the cathedral are Rockville granite from St. Cloud, Minnesota (from the Clark quarry). The interior walls are American Travertine from Mankato, Minnesota. The interior columns are made of several types of marble.

The interior was designed to make visitors feel as if they are in a boat, with the Latin word for the area where the congregation sits, nave, meaning "boat"; a sunburst chandelier hangs overhead, and waves are carved into the walls and the pews.

The interior dome and interior mosaics of the four cardinal virtues beneath the dome were created by Joseph Capecchi, a Florentine sculptor. The designs for the mosaics were sent to Italy to be crafted by Michelangelo Bedini.

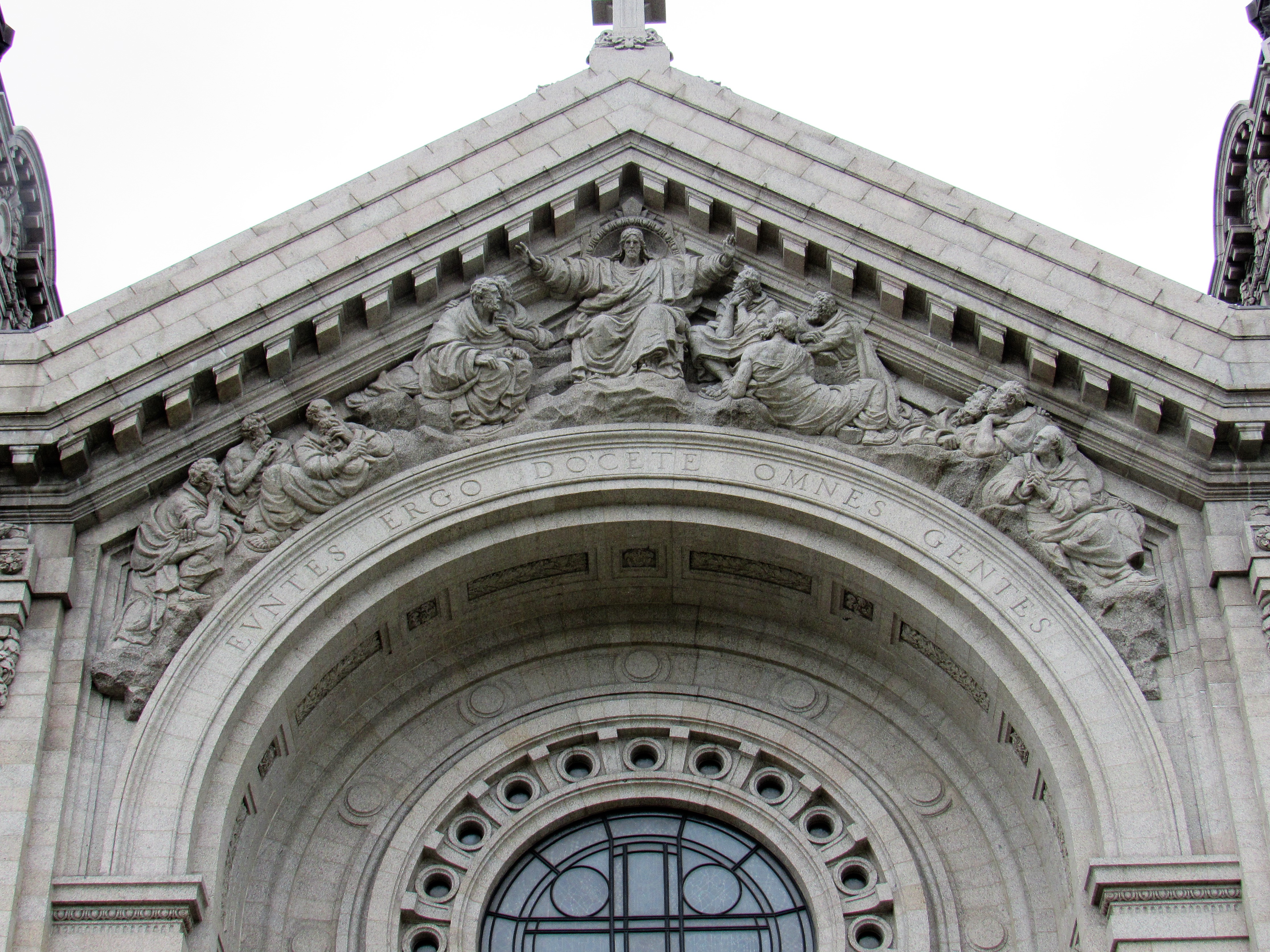
The east façade

=== Exterior façade ===
Carved in granite above the main doors and primary rose window of the cathedral are Christ and the eleven apostles, with the words "Euntes docete omnes gentes", or "Go, therefore, to all nations" from Matthew 28. On either side of the frieze are carved figures of St. Peter and St. Paul. Beneath the rose window are two angels bearing the words "Erat lux vera quae illuminat omnem hominem venientem in hunc mundum," or "He was the true light that enlightens every man who comes into this world" from John 1:9.

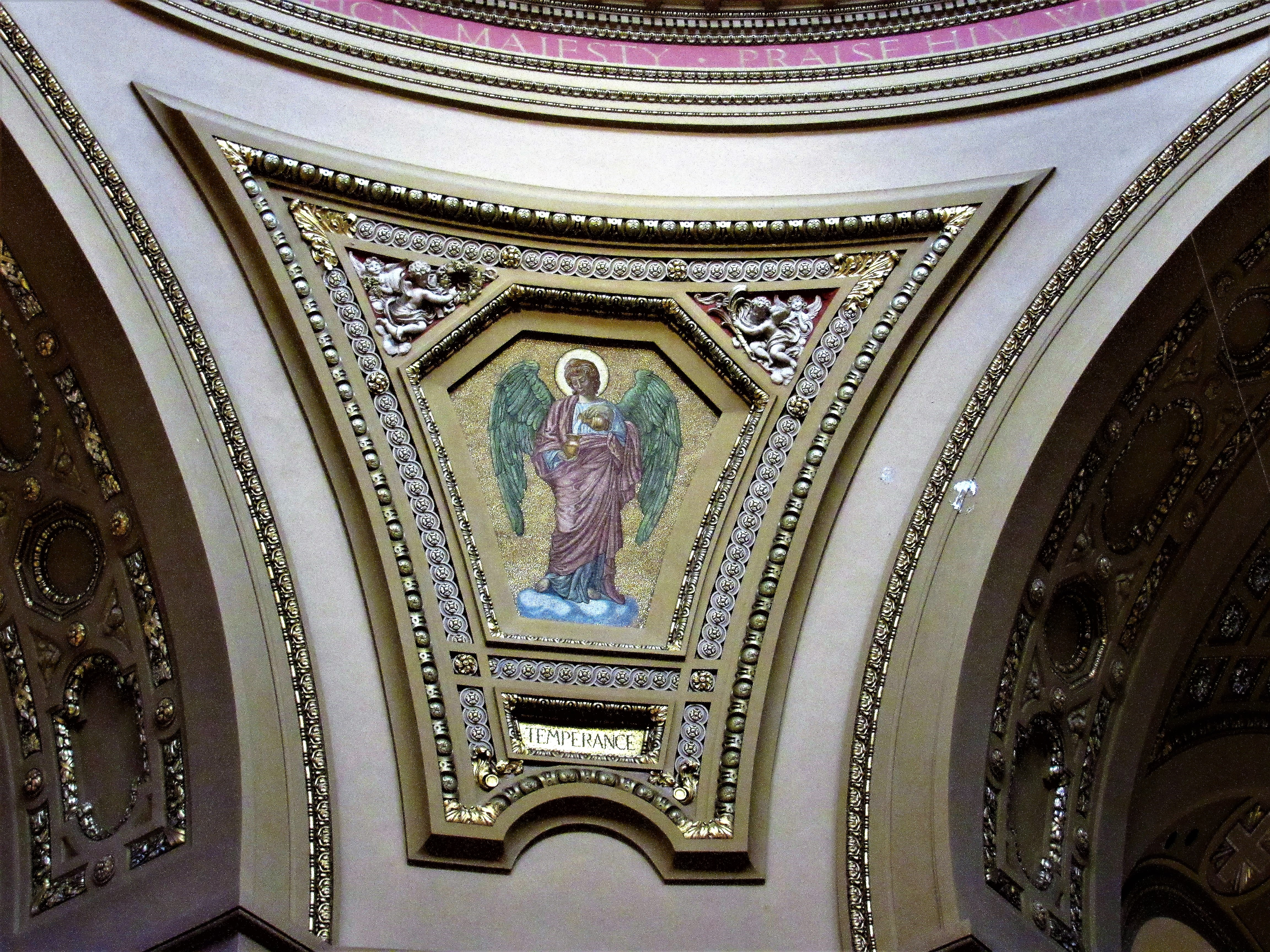
The Temperance mosaic

=== Art ===
The interior is illuminated by twenty-four stained glass windows featuring angelic choirs. Three rose windows in the transepts were designed by Charles Connick.

Heroic size marble statues of the four evangelists, sculpted by John Angel, are set into the niches of the piers in the four corners of the church. This placement was not coincidental, according to Msgr. Lawrence Ryan (Historical Sketch of the Cathedral of St. Paul, 1904–1937), for as the piers hold up the church of stone, so the Word recorded by Matthew, Mark, Luke and John sustains that Church not made by human hands. Each statue rises to a height of 11'6" and weighs eight tons. The life of Saint Paul is honored by a bronze baldachin, as well as massive bronze Te Deum and Magnificat grilles.

=== Chapels ===
The cathedral also has six chapels dedicated to the patron saints of the European ethnic groups that settled the area around the city: St. Anthony for the Italians, St. John the Baptist for the French Canadians, St. Patrick for the Irish, St. Boniface for the Germans, Saints Cyril and Methodius for the Slavs; and St. Therese of Lisieux for the missionaries. Each shrine contains a circular slab of marble from the saint's home country. The chapel to the Little Flower has incorporated into its gospel-side wall small stone from the Rouen Castle where St. Joan of Arc was imprisoned. There are also chapels dedicated to the Sacred Heart, to Mary, the mother of Jesus, and to Saint Joseph, her husband, as well as to Saint Peter.

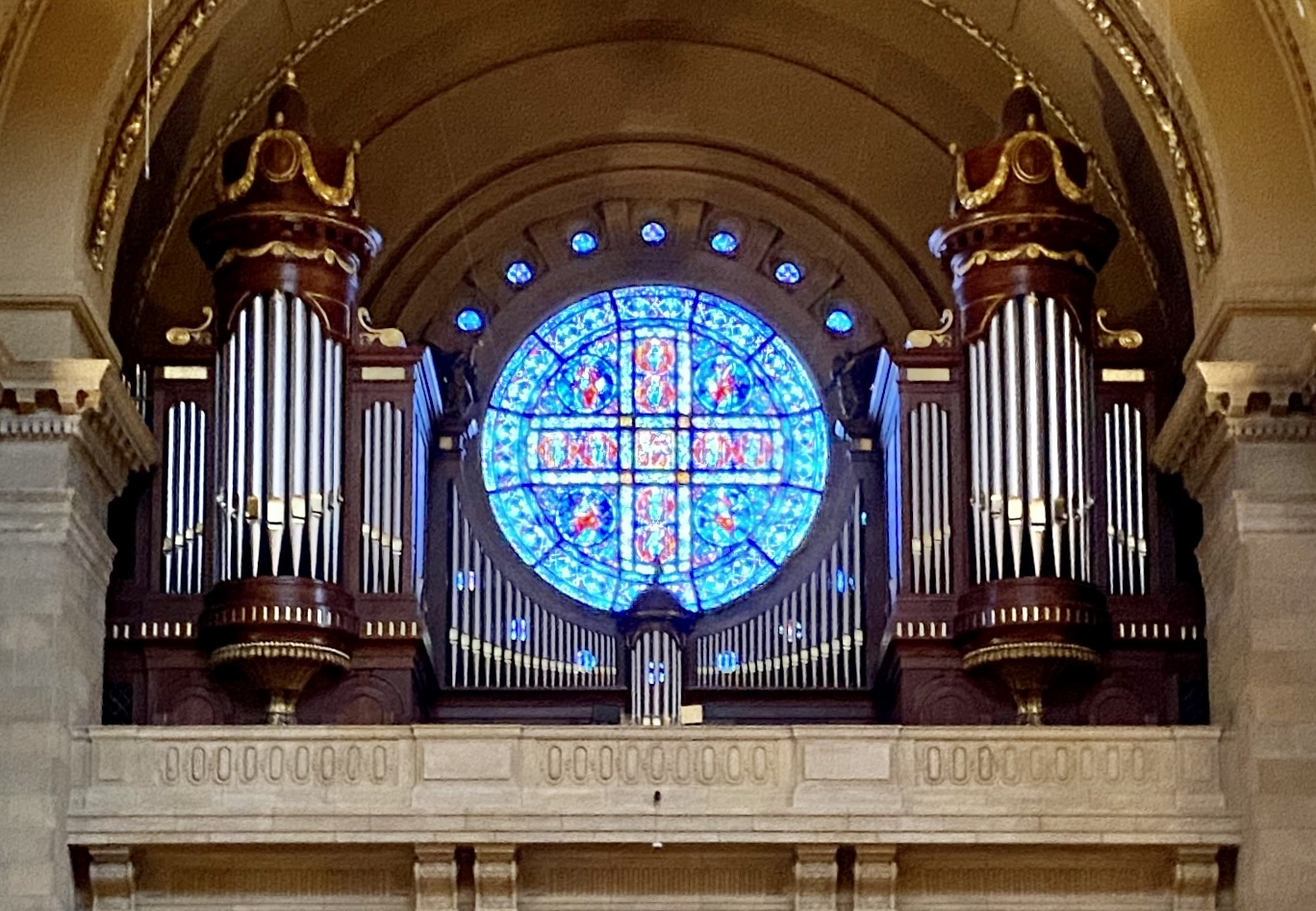
Rear organ case

=== Organs ===
An E. M. Skinner organ was installed above the entrance to the sacristy, behind the sanctuary, in 1927. An Æolian-Skinner organ was installed in the choir loft gallery in 1963. The organs have twin consoles, which can be used to play either organ or both at the same time.

A restoration of the sanctuary organ by Quimby Pipe Organs took place in 2013 In conjunction with the restoration, a new organ case for the gallery organ was completed by architect Duncan G Stroik. The design was based on a blueprint from the original design of the cathedral by Emmanuel Masqueray. The hand-carved walnut organ case preserves the view of the cathedral's rose window. Human-sized carved angels stand on both sides of the organ case and a statue of Saint Cecilia, patron saint of music, stands on top of the central organ case dome, directly below the rose window. In commemoration of the restoration, Olivier Latry of Notre-Dame de Paris performed at the cathedral on October 24, 2013. The project cost $3.4 million.

=== Bells ===
For the first seventy years of the cathedral's operations, a small bell from the previous cathedral had been the only bell. Under the direction of Monsignor Ambrose Hayden, five new bronze bells were installed in the cathedral towers in 1986, to ring in time for Christmas Eve midnight Mass. The $140,000 ($411,202 in 2025) cost was paid for by parishioners. The bells were cast in France by Fonderie Paccard.

== Notable events ==
Eugenio Cardinal Pacelli, who would become Pope Pius XII in 1939, visited the United States in October 1936, with one of his stops being in St. Paul. Pacelli, then the papal secretary of state, celebrated 7:45 a.m. Mass on October 27 at the cathedral. A bronze plaque commemorating the visit was installed in 1946.

As part of a "whirlwind", 21-hour tour of Minnesota, President John F. Kennedy attended the 11 o'clock Mass at the Cathedral on October 7, 1962. A special phone line with direct service to the White House was installed for the occasion. Around 8,000 people crowded in and around the cathedral on the rainy day, with 6,000 inside the building and another 2,000 outside. Many attendees sat through 8 a.m., 9 a.m., and 10 a.m. Masses to see Kennedy. Bishop Gerald Francis O'Keefe preached on the importance of the upcoming Second Vatican Council. A plaque commemorates the pew where Kennedy sat.

In 1974, a vandal set fire to the basement of the cathedral, causing smoke damage in the church. During a 1974 Christmas midnight Mass celebrated by Msgr. Ambrose Hayden, two streakers ran through the cathedral.

On March 25, 2009, the United States Conference of Catholic Bishops declared the Cathedral of Saint Paul to be a National Shrine to the Apostle Paul – the first in Minnesota and the only one in North America dedicated to the Apostle Paul. A stone relic from the tomb of St. Paul was given to the cathedral in 2012.

After the killing of Philando Castile, Castile's family, though Baptist, requested that his funeral be able to be held at the cathedral. Archbishop Bernard Hebda granted the request, and on July 14, 2016, a funeral service for Philando Castile took place at the cathedral, attended by thousands of mourners.

For seven years, the cathedral hosted the Red Bull Crashed Ice competition. The 500-yard, 12-story ramp brought up to 120,000 spectators to the neighborhood to watch the race skating event. Red Bull paid an undisclosed, but "generous" donation to the cathedral for hosting the event. After the 2018 season, Red Bull chose to move the event to Japan, Finland and Boston.

== Rectors ==
- J. Lawler (1915–May 1916)
- T. J. Gibbons (May 1916–July 1916)
- L. F. Ryan (July 1916 – 1940)
- J. J. Cullinan (1940–1942)
- Francis J. Schenk (1942–1945)
- George E. Ryan (1945–?)
- Gerald Francis O'Keefe (1961–1967)
- Ambrose Hayden (1967–1993)
- John Estrem (1993–2004)
- Michael C. Skluzacek (2004–2006)
- Joseph Johnson (2006–2012)
- John Ubel (2012–2024)
- Joseph Johnson (2024–present)

== See also ==
- List of Catholic cathedrals in the United States
- List tallest domes
- List of tallest buildings in St. Paul
- List of largest church buildings

== Notes ==
Preceded by Saint Paul Pioneer Press Building	Tallest Building in Saint Paul; 1915—1931; 93 m	Succeeded by First National Bank Building
