= Ambrose Hayden =

Catholic monsignor (1918–1997)

Monsignor Ambrose Valerian Hayden HP
- Church: Catholic Church
- Archdiocese: Saint Paul and Minneapolis

Orders
- Ordination: January 29, 1944

Personal details
- Born: September 1, 1918 Le Sueur, Minnesota
- Died: June 24, 1997 (aged 78) Minneapolis, Minnesota, U.S.

Ambrose Valerian Hayden (September 1, 1918 – June 24, 1997) was a Roman Catholic prelate of the Archdiocese of Saint Paul and Minneapolis. After spending time as a librarian for the archdiocesan seminaries, he served as rector of the Cathedral of Saint Paul and as archdiocesan finance officer and vicar general. He was named as an auxiliary bishop for the diocese, but resigned the position for health reasons prior to his consecration. He died on June 24, 1997, at the age of 78.

== Early life ==
Ambrose Valerian Hayden was born on September 1, 1918, in Le Sueur, Minnesota, to James and Mary Hayden. He attended grade school in a one room schoolhouse. For some time, he worked at a corn factory in Le Sueur. He graduated from Le Sueur Public High School in 1936 as valedictorian. He attended the College of Saint Thomas and the Saint Paul Seminary, and was ordained on January 29, 1944.

== Priesthood ==
After his ordination, while he hoped for a parish assignment, Hayden was assigned as director of the Saint Paul Seminary library by Archbishop John Gregory Murray. He earned graduate degrees in library science from the University of Minnesota and the University of Michigan. He served as spiritual director and librarian at Nazareth Hall Preparatory Seminary from 1948 to 1962. He was the archdiocesan director of vocations for five years, and also headed the archdiocesan liturgy office after Vatican II.

He was named a monsignor in 1962, with the rank of domestic prelate. In 1964, he offered Masses broadcast on TV from Holy Childhood parish in St. Paul. He served as vicar for finances and vicar general of the diocese from 1967 to 1983, and conducted one of the first external audits of a major archdiocese in 1969. He served as rector of the Cathedral of Saint Paul from 1967 to 1993, witnessing race riots on Selby Avenue in 1969. He was called a "walking encyclopedia of archdiocesan history and lore". He facilitated St. Paul Cathedral's hosting of the funeral of Nick Coleman in 1981, despite controversy surrounding him.

=== Appointment as auxiliary bishop ===
On April 20, 1967, Pope Paul VI named Hayden an auxiliary bishop of Saint Paul and Minneapolis, and titular bishop of Lamsorti. His consecration was scheduled for May 31, 1967, but it was delayed due to a hospitalization. He ultimately was never consecrated a bishop, apparently for health reasons.

== Later years ==
Hayden retired in 1993 and moved into the archdiocesan Leo C. Byrne residence for retired priests in St. Paul. He died on June 24, 1997, and was buried at Calvary Cemetery in Le Sueur. The Hall of the Angels in the Cathedral of St. Paul was renamed to Monsignor Ambrose Hayden Hall in 1998 in his honor.
