= Hollywood Tower =

- Hollywood Tower (F.K.A. La Belle Tour)
- U.S. National Register of Historic Places
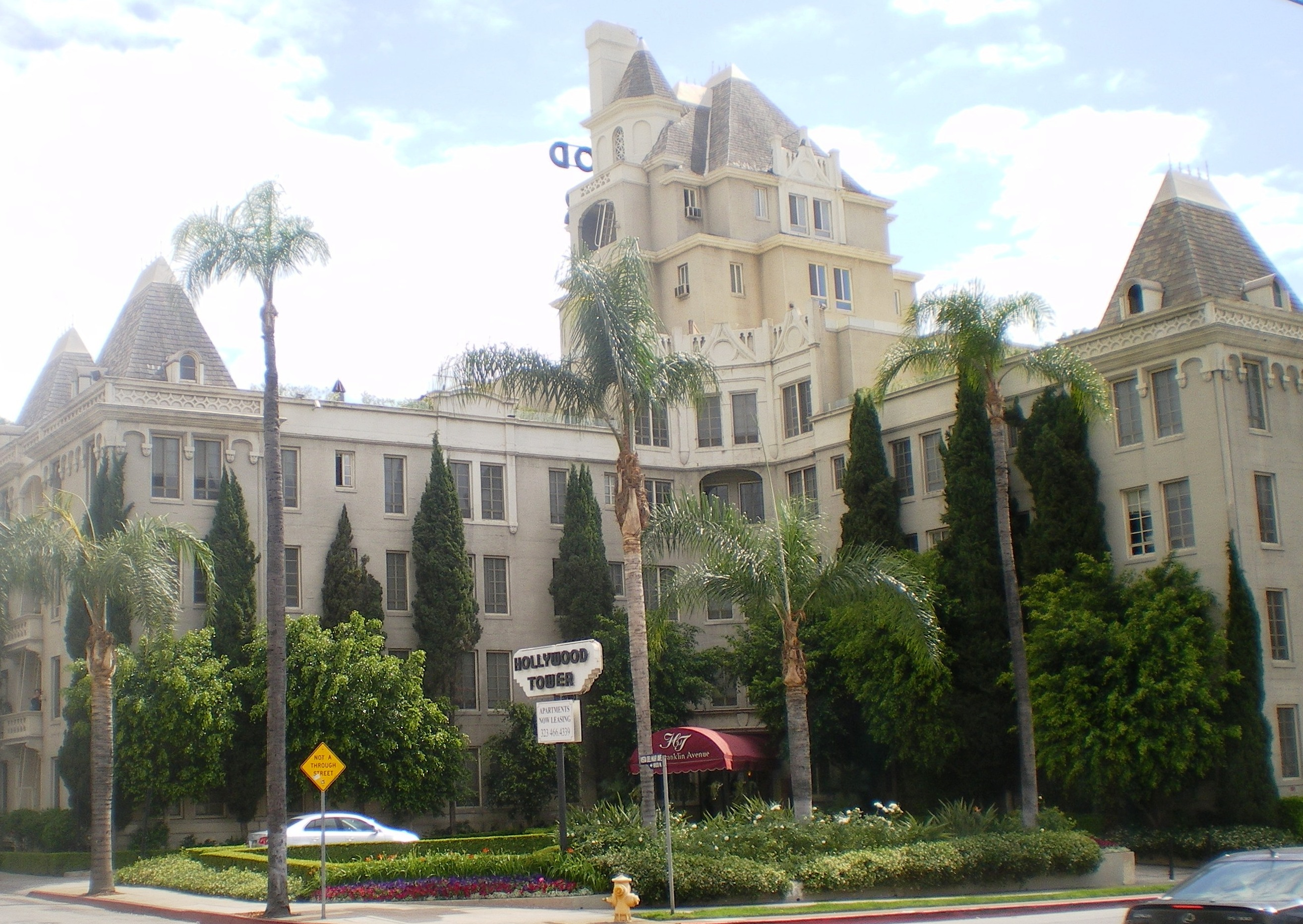
- Hollywood Tower, 2008

- Location within the Los Angeles metropolitan area Location within California Location within the United States
- Location: 6200 Franklin Ave., Hollywood, California
- Coordinates: 34°6′17.5″N 118°19′27.9″W
- Built: 1929
- Architect: Cramer & Wise
- Architectural style: Late 19th- and 20th-century revivals, Renaissance
- NRHP reference No.: 87002291
- Added to NRHP: January 22, 1988

Hollywood Tower, originally known as La Belle Tour, is a large apartment building in Hollywood, Los Angeles, California. The tower, built in 1929, was a popular residence for entertainment industry employees for many years and has often been cited as the inspiration for Disney's The Twilight Zone Tower of Terror attractions. The real-life Hollywood Tower was listed in the National Register of Historic Places in 1988.

== Sophisticated living in Hollywood's "Golden Age" ==
The V-shaped building, designed by architects Cramer & Wise in a faux French Normandy style, was built in 1929. At the time, it was a Class A building with more than 50 apartments, with three penthouse units, a subterranean garage, and private and public roof gardens. Located in the heart of Hollywood, the tower became a favorite place of residence for entertainment industry employees. A plaque by the front door reads: "Hollywood Tower. 1929. Sophisticated living for film luminaries during the 'Golden Age' of Hollywood." Actor George Raft owned an interest in the building and lived there for a time. In her novel Stormy Weather, Paula L. Woods wrote: "Hollywood Tower was a seven-story, indecisive gray building at the corner of Franklin and Vista Del Mar in Hollywood. The faux French Normandy apartment building was so old it probably had a view of the sea when it was built [...] Hollywood Tower, though, was a last vestige of an earlier era. You could tell by the way the planting in the front was kept neatly trimmed and the lobby smelled Spic-and-Span clean."

The building directly abuts the Hollywood Freeway, and its neon "HOLLYWOOD TOWER" sign looking directly over the northbound freeway is a Hollywood landmark. Hollywood historian Marc Wanamaker said, "It has been a major landmark since it was built. Even before the freeway, it was a landmark on that hill."

== Purchases and sales of the property ==
The building was purchased over the years by South American investors for $300,000 in 1937, by Justus P. Seeburg in 1939 for $250,000, and by Sam Gutlin in 1953 for $642,000.

In 1978, the Hollywood Tower was sold to Deseret Properties, a Glendale, California firm owned by Blain Anderson. When Deseret bought the property, it was in poor shape, and the new owner invested approximately $50,000 in new carpeting and paint. However, Deseret found the project to be difficult to operate due to the adoption of rent control by the City of Los Angeles in 1978, and problems collecting rent from tenants who "didn't get that part" or "didn't sell that piece of music". In order to achieve a more stable flow of rental income, the new owner began courting senior citizens as tenants, and by 1981, 31 of the building's 56 apartments were occupied by senior citizens.

The building was sold in 2007 for $34.5 million to a Phoenix-based developer Alliance Residential with plans to build additional units on the land across Vista del Mar. Since the acquisition, ownership has invested more than $1 million in renovations and upgrades to the building and opened the new adjacent development, La Belle, in mid-2010.

As of 2015, The Hollywood Tower has been sold to Los Angeles-based developer MWest Holdings, and managed by their subsidiary, Polaris management. La Belle has been sold to Legacy Partners and is now known as "La Belle at Hollywood Tower". The two buildings are effectively separate entities.

== Historic designation ==
The Hollywood Tower was listed in the National Register of Historic Places in 1988.

== In popular culture ==
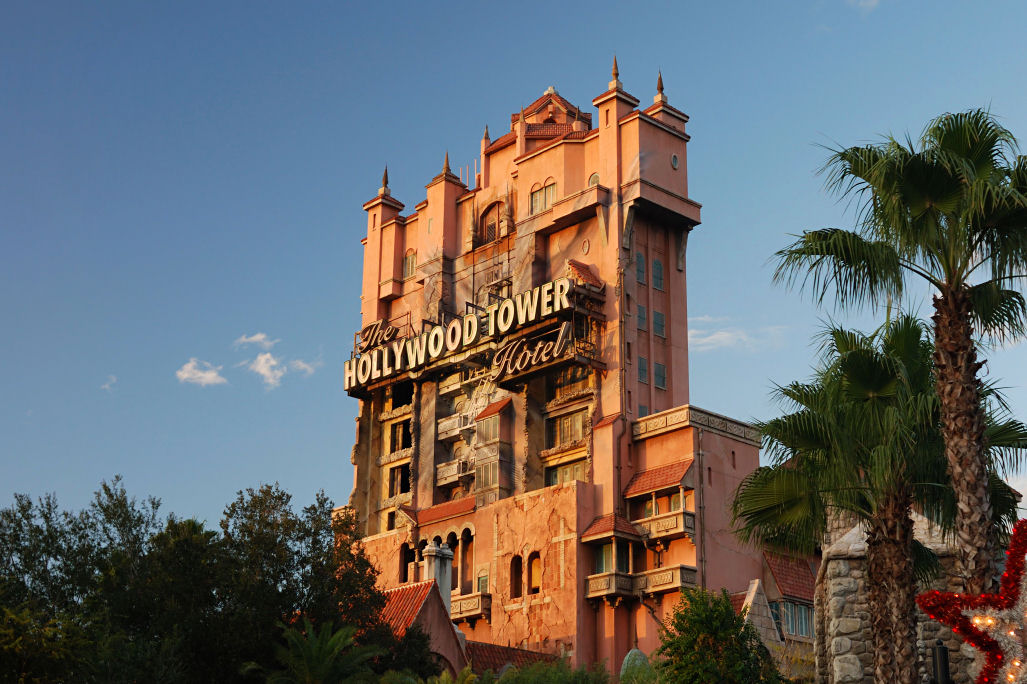
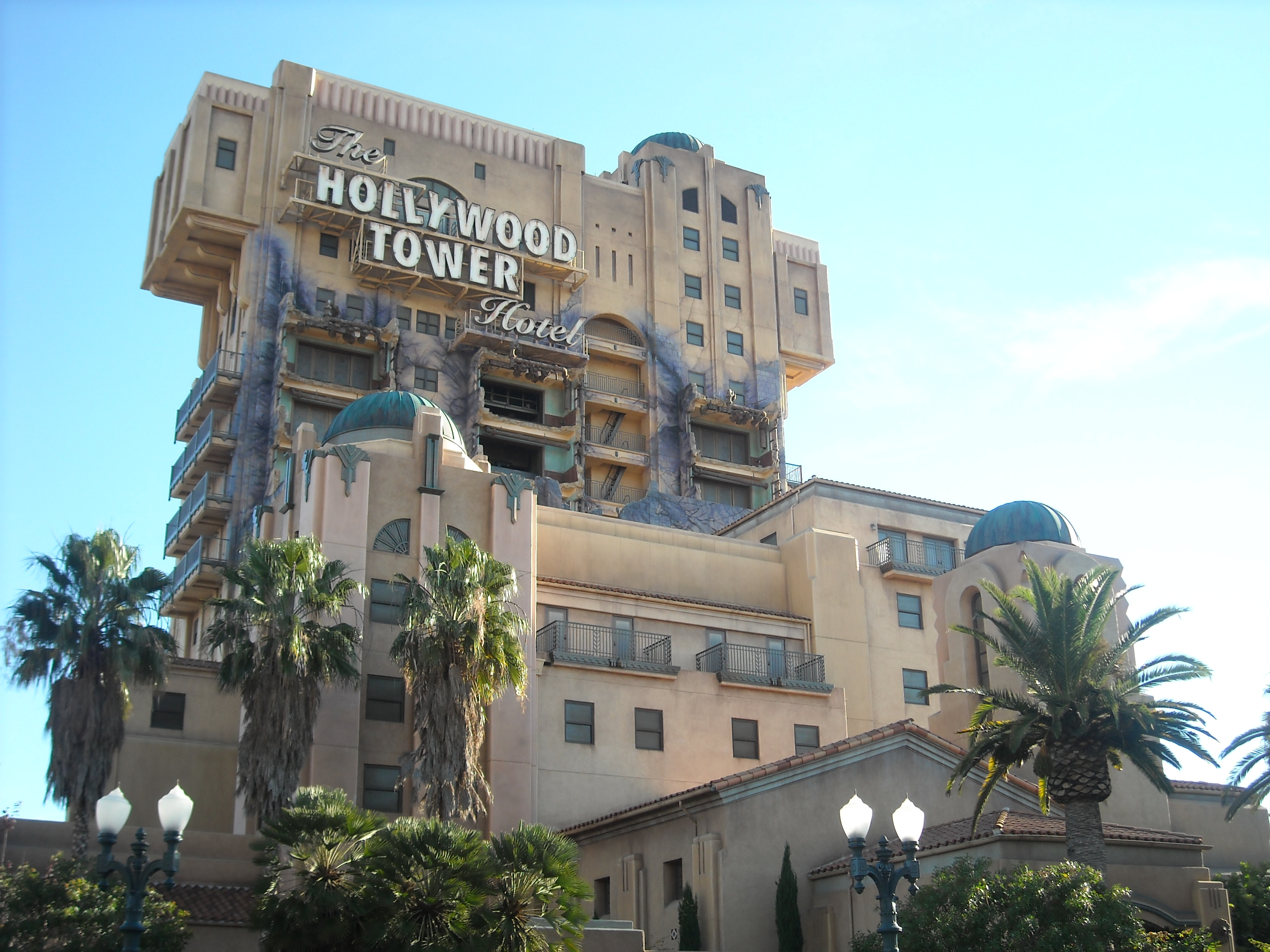
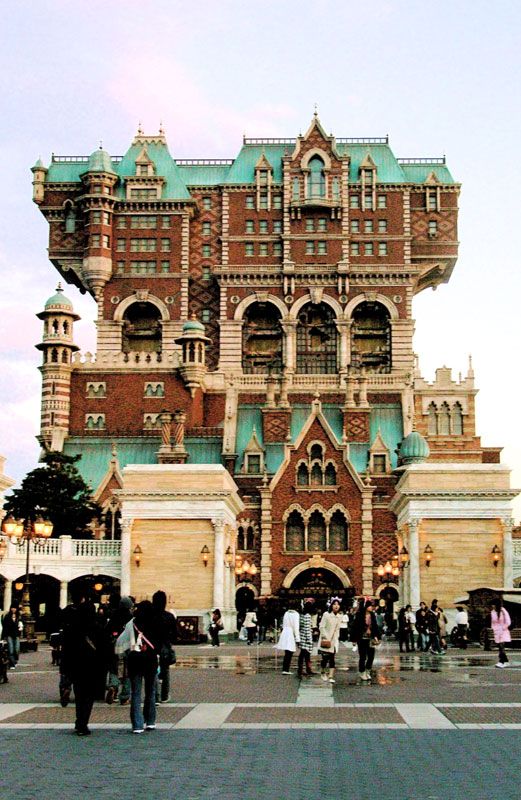
From left to right, Disney's The Twilight Zone Tower of Terror ride at Disney's Hollywood Studios, Disney California Adventure, Tokyo DisneySea and Disney Adventure World.

Though the architectural styles differ, the Hollywood Tower is "often cited as the inspiration" for The Twilight Zone Tower of Terror attractions at Disney parks in Florida, California, Paris and Tokyo. Like the real-life Hollywood Tower, the "Hollywood Tower Hotel" structure at the Disney theme parks bears the same classic "Hollywood Tower" sign and spiraling towers. A made-for-TV adaptation based on the ride entitled Tower of Terror was released in 1997, though while both the attraction and the movie shared the same basic premise of five people being killed in an elevator, the movie lacked any connection to The Twilight Zone.

The Hollywood Tower appears prominently, by name, in the 1948 mystery film Devil's Cargo, part of The Falcon series. It is also featured in Brian De Palma's 1984 thriller Body Double, a movie notable for its setting in a number of Los Angeles landmarks. The Hollywood Tower received ample screen time in the 1980 screwball comedy Midnight Madness, produced by Walt Disney Productions.

== Notable residents ==
- Well-known motion picture character actor Eugene Pallette was one of the first residents and lived in the building for all the 1930s.
- The Scottish comic actor James Finlayson was a resident in 1937.
- Then-struggling actor Robert Patrick and his wife were residents in the early 1990s when Patrick got his big break in Terminator 2: Judgment Day.

== See also ==
- Los Angeles Historic-Cultural Monuments in Hollywood
