= Cities Church =

Historic building in Saint Paul, Minnesota, US

- U.S. Historic district – Contributing property
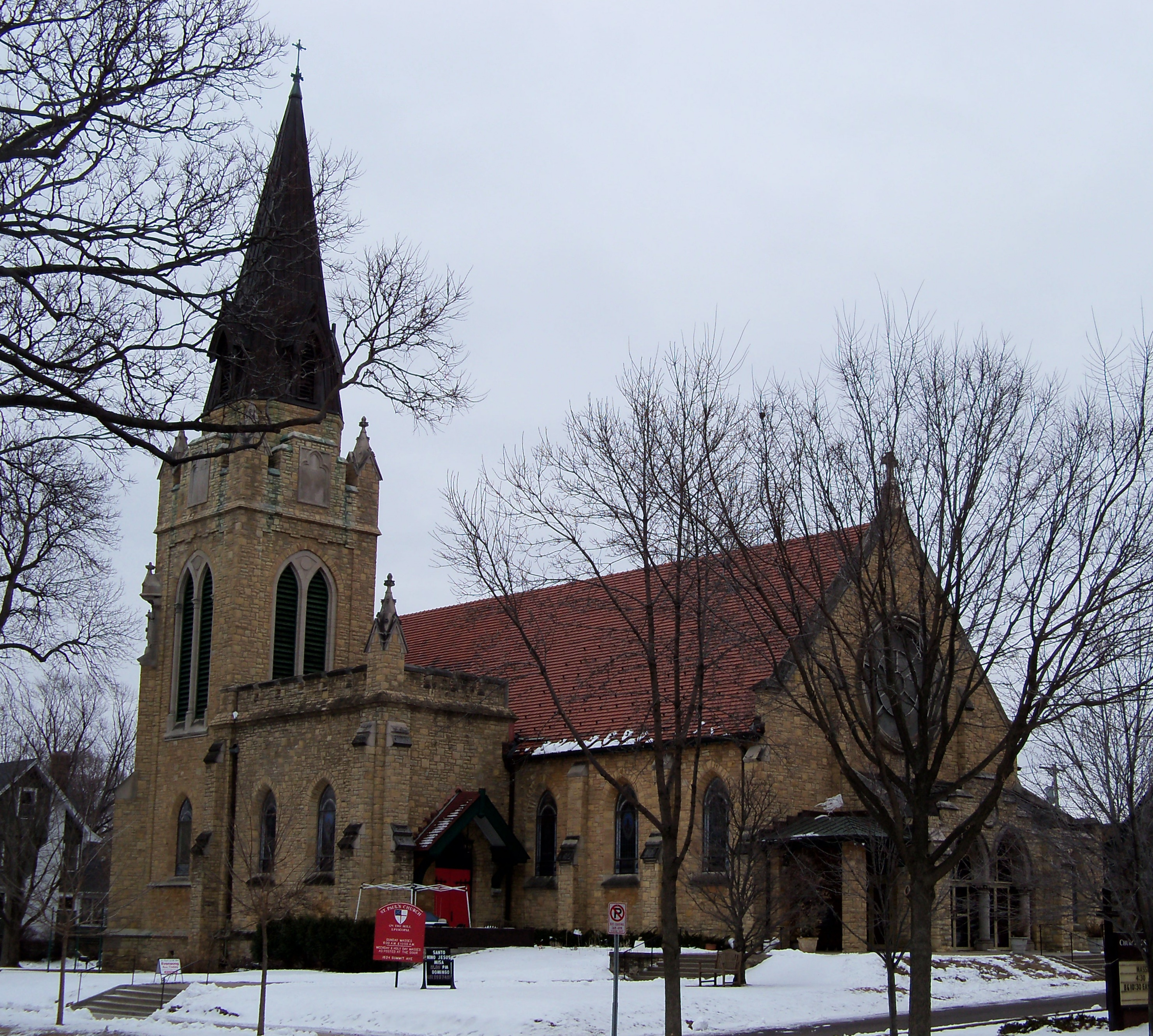
- St. Paul's-on-the-Hill pictured in 2012 before its closure and sale to Cities Church
- Location: 1524 Summit Avenue, Saint Paul, Minnesota, US
- Coordinates: 44.9410°N 93.1649°W
- Built: 1913
- Built by: W. M. Carlson
- Architect: Emmanuel Louis Masqueray
- Architectural style: Gothic Revival
- Website: citieschurch.com
- Part of: West Summit Avenue Historic District (ID93000332)
- Added to NRHP: May 4, 1993
- Cities Church
- Denomination: Southern Baptist Convention

Cities Church is a historic church building in St. Paul, Minnesota, United States. Completed in 1913 as St. Paul's-on-the-Hill Episcopal Church, the Gothic Revival building is a contributing property to the West Summit Avenue Historic District. After the Episcopal congregation dwindled, the church was closed in 2015 and the building was sold. In 2020, Cities Church, a Baptist congregation, purchased the building.

The church was the site of protests during the 2026 U.S. immigration enforcement protests, resulting in multiple arrests and charges under the Freedom of Access to Clinic Entrances Act, which includes penalties for disrupting worship services.

== Architecture ==
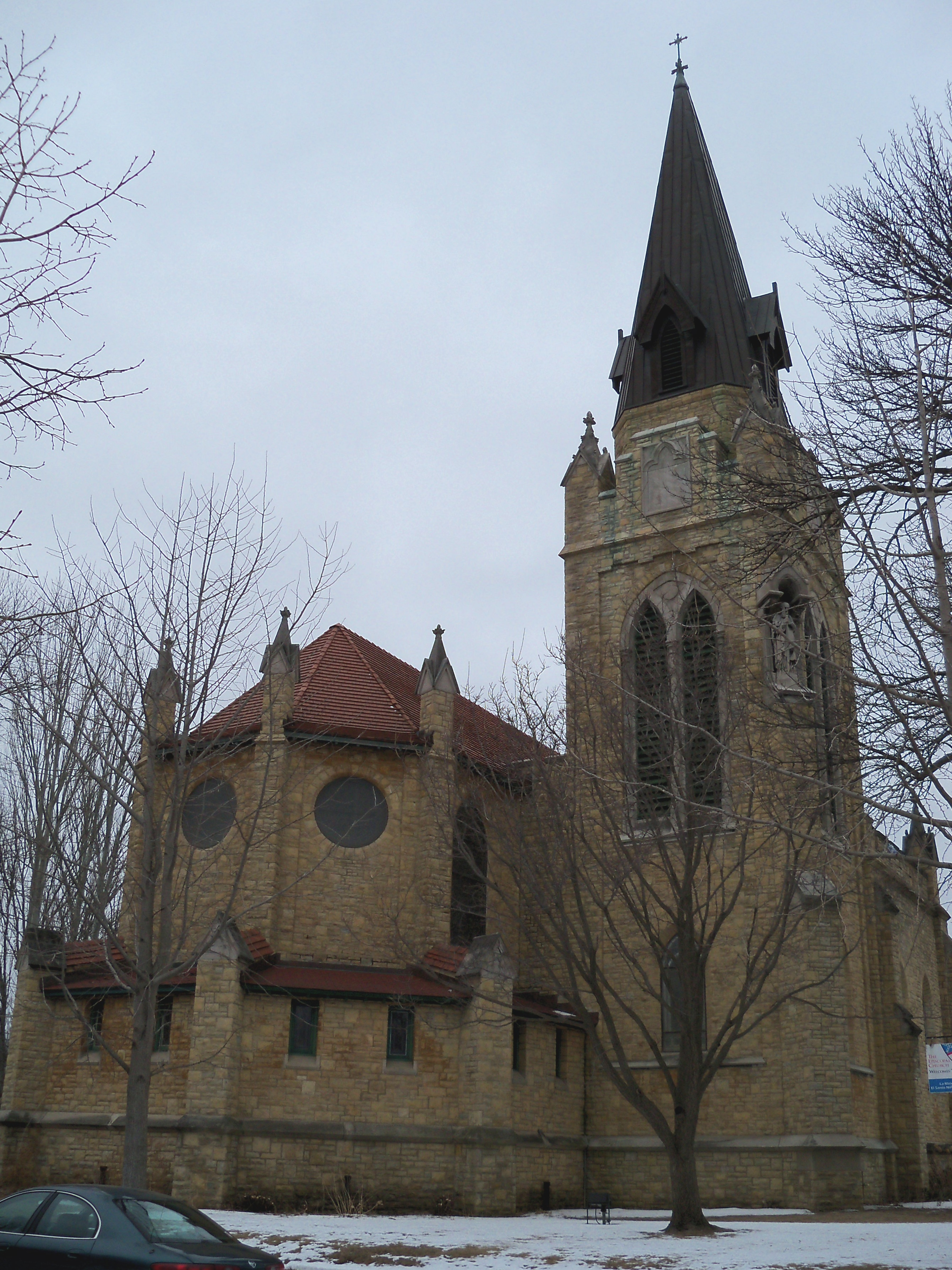
The apse and tower of St. Paul's-on-the-Hill in 2012

St. Paul's-on-the-Hill was built in 1913 by W. M. Carlson to a design by Emmanuel Louis Masqueray. The church features a Gothic Revival design that includes a rose window in its west end. The walls are random-coursed with ashlar-cut limestone and the red-tiled roof is gabled with a parapet. The roof was redesigned after it failed to drain properly during Minnesota's harsh winters.

A two-story stone tower topped by a spire is located near the apse on the north side of the church. The tower is adjacent to an entrance porch featuring a crenelated parapet. The side walls feature stained-glass lancet windows set between limestone buttresses. The church has 33 stained-glass windows.

An entrance porch on the building's west end, covered by a shed roof and corbie-stepped parapet, was added after the building was constructed. The rear of the church includes a modern addition with gabled and flat roofs; it houses childcare facilities, an office, a kitchen, and meeting space.

== History ==
St. Paul's congregation was founded in 1854 and erected a building in Lowertown in 1857. Early members included Governor Henry Hastings Sibley, Minnesota House Speaker John L. Merriam, and Governor William Rush Merriam. The church moved to West Summit Avenue in 1913 and hired Masqueray, who had designed other prominent churches in Saint Paul, to design a new church. Masqueray's design made use of the 1857 building's limestone, tower spire, altar, pews, and stained-glass windows.

St. Paul's churchmanship was Anglo-Catholic. Attendance declined over the course of the 20th century and it was further affected when a former priest was convicted of abuse of a minor. The church eventually lost its parish status and became a mission of the Episcopal Church in Minnesota before closing in 2015. Three years later, the building was sold to a real estate developer who intended to turn it into a performing arts center and conservatory. The building remained a "historic nonoperating cemetery" because former rector John Wright was buried in a crypt under the sanctuary in 1919.

Cities Church, a Southern Baptist Convention (SBC)-affiliated church that adheres to the Reformed 1689 London Baptist Confession, was planted through the North American Mission Board in 2016. The church began renting the former St. Paul's building after its 2018 sale and the congregation purchased the building in 2020. At the time, the church had 500 people in weekly attendance. of The St. Paul Conservatory of Music continued to rent classroom space and use of the sanctuary as a performance hall.

=== 2026 protest ===
On January 18, amid the 2026 U.S. immigration enforcement protests, dozens of protesters disrupted a Sunday worship service at Cities Church, protesting against lay pastor and elder David Easterwood, who they alleged was the acting field director for Immigration and Customs Enforcement in Minnesota. Videos taken during the protest show protestors chanting "ICE out!" and "David Easterwood, out now!"; they also appear to show the protestors intimidating worshipers. That afternoon, Assistant Attorney General for Civil Rights Harmeet Dhillon posted on X that the Department of Justice (DoJ) was investigating the protestors for potential violations of the FACE Act, a law intended to prevent impeding access to abortion clinics and disruption of worship services.

On January 20, Cities Church issued a statement stating that protesters accosted their congregation, frightened children, and created a scene using intimidation and threats. The church also said it was reviewing legal options. That same day, federal magistrate judge Douglas Micko found probable cause in three of eight arrest warrants presented by the DoJ. The remaining arrest warrants were reviewed by a three-judge panel of the United States Court of Appeals for the Eighth Circuit, and on January 23, the panel declined to order the district court to sign the warrants.

The three protesters whose arrest warrants were approved were arrested on January 22, then released following court orders the next day. Additionally, Judge Micko denied the DoJ's application for FACE Act charges against two of the three arrested (one of whom was Nekima Levy Armstrong, former president of Minneapolis's chapter of the NAACP). He also denied an application to bring charges against journalist Don Lemon, who had been reporting on the protest.

On January 30, Attorney General Pam Bondi said that Lemon, another journalist, and two others had been arrested at her direction. On February 2, two more demonstrators were arrested and charged with violations of the FACE Act, and thirty more were indicted later that month.

The protest was widely condemned by evangelical leaders, including Franklin Graham, Southern Baptist Theological Seminary President Albert Mohler, Southern Baptist Convention President Clint Pressley, and Biola University professor Ed Stetzer. Religious leaders who opposed ICE's enforcement tactics, including Episcopal Bishop of Washington Mariann Budde and Cooperative Baptist Fellowship minister Brian Kaylor, also expressed concern. President Donald Trump condemned the protest as well.
