= Lester A. Cramer =

American architect

Lester A. Cramer was an American architect. His most famous work was the Ecclesia, the Rosicrucian healing temple on Mount Ecclesia.

== Biography ==
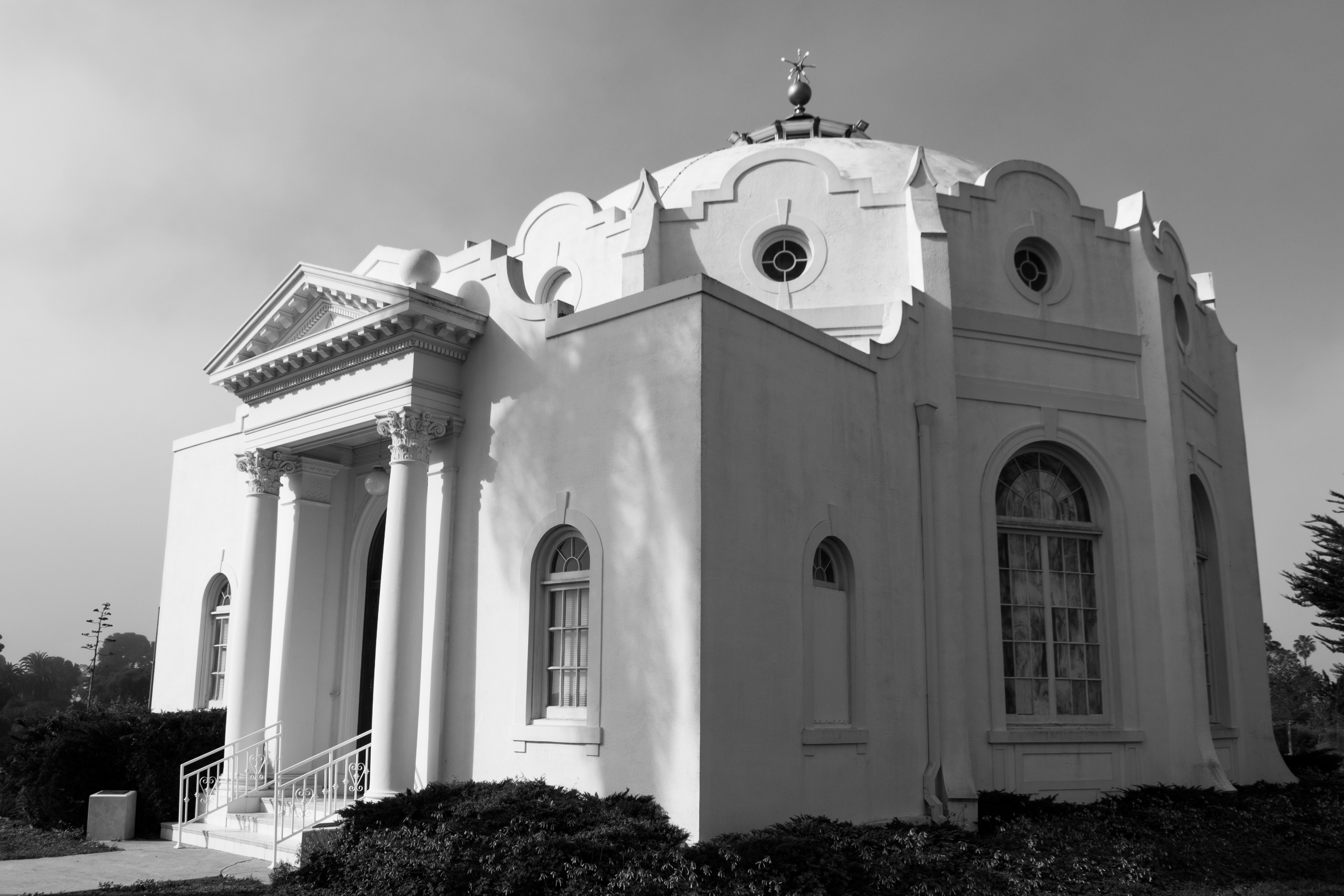
The Ecclesia on Mount Ecclesia.

Lester Cramer was the student of Emmanuel Louis Masqueray.

In the late 1800s, the records show he was in New York and contracted for the alterations to a four-story brick in February 1897, and for a similar work on a three-story and basement brick tenement in April 1897.

Lester Cramer, a Probationer of The Rosicrucian Fellowship, delivered the plans for the construction of the Ecclesia, the healing temple on Mount Ecclesia in 1915. The building was completed in 1922. He also drew the plans for the "Sanitarium" building in 1929.

Lester Cramer still lived in New York in 1915 when he started to work on the Rosicrucian project in LA, but then the records show he ran an architect firm in Los Angeles, Cramer, Bartlett & Wise, Architects and Engineers. In 1925, the firm became Cramer & Wise, Architects and Engineers.

== Work by Cramer & Wise ==
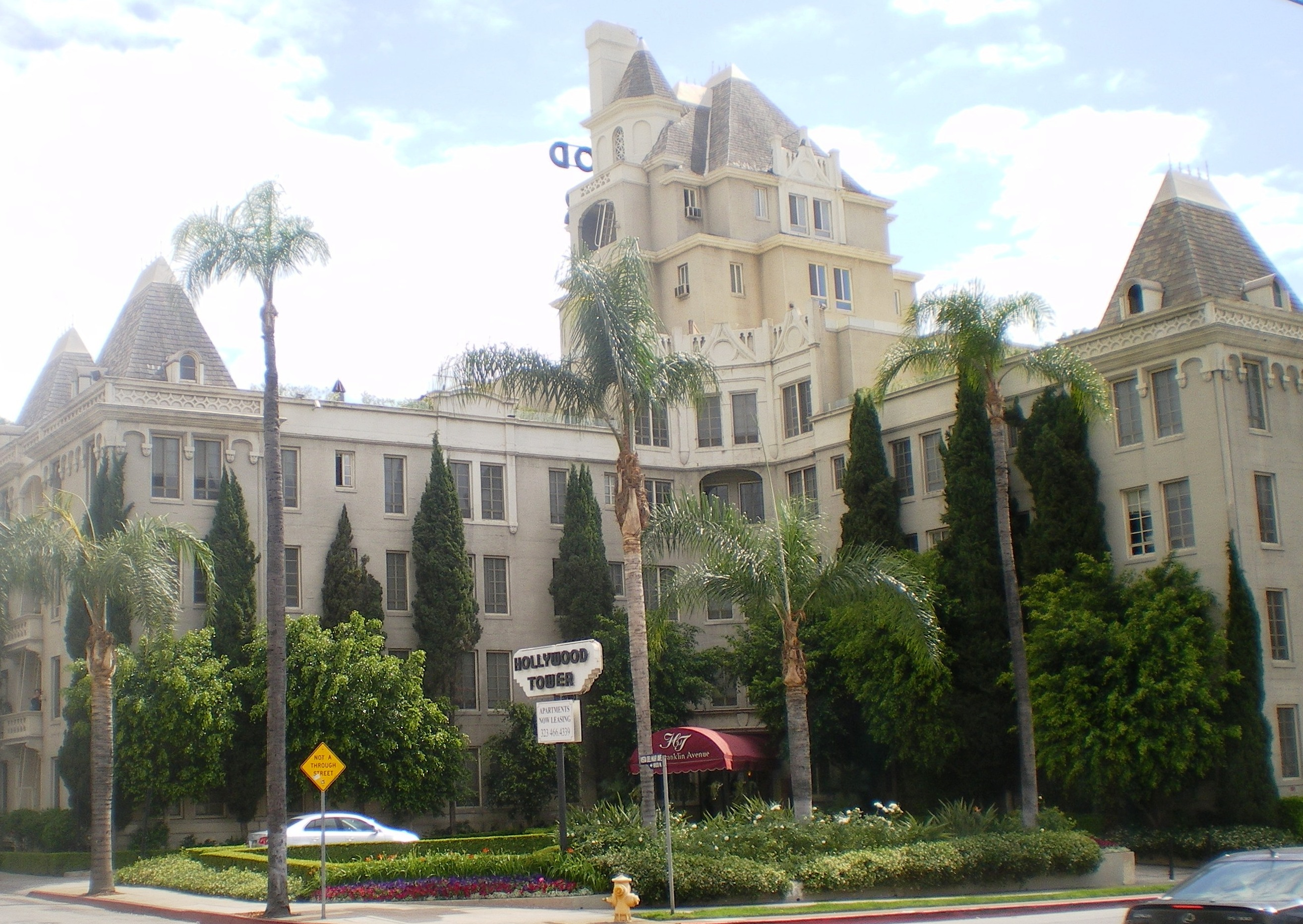
La Belle Tour (Hollywood Tower), 6200 Franklin Ave., Los Angeles, California.

Cramer & Wise for a very active architect firm in the 1920s. It specialized in the design of 5 to 10-story apartments/hotel buildings. The firm also built many apartment courts in the foothills of Los Angeles.

- Motor-In Markets: Drive-in market, pioneering concept of the car culture of the 1920s
- Hollywood Tower (La Belle Tour) in Hollywood: Built in 1929 and listed NRHP in 1988. This iconic building is considered the main influence for Disney's The Twilight Zone Tower of Terror.
- Franklin Plaza Apartments on 5640 Franklin Avenue in Hollywood: Built in 1929, combines Spanish Mediterranean, Italian Renaissance Revival and Neo-Classical elements.
- The Monarch on Bunker Hill, Los Angeles: Opened in 1929.
- The Van Rensellear Apartments in Los Angeles

== Related pages ==
- Mount Ecclesia
- Eclecticism in architecture
