= Quimby Pipe Organs =

Quimby Pipe Organs, Inc. is an American builder of pipe organs, based in Warrensburg, Missouri.

The firm was founded in 1970 by Michael Quimby, President and Tonal Director, and incorporated in the State of Missouri in 1980. The company has built and restored organs throughout the United States, including the Cathedral of St. John the Divine (New York City), St. Paul's Cathedral (San Diego), St. Margaret’s Episcopal Church (Palm Desert, CA), and Catalina United Methodist Church (Tucson, Arizona).

Along with building new instruments and restorations, Quimby Pipe Organs maintains and tunes instruments both in the Midwest and across the United States.

Quimby Pipe Organs is a member firm of APOBA, the Associated Pipe Organ Builders of America, and co-sponsors the American Guild of Organists' biannual Regional Competitions for Young Organists.
