= Mount Ecclesia =

Headquarters of The Rosicrucian Fellowship in Oceanside, California, U.S.

Coordinates: 33°12′42″N 117°21′33″W

- Rosicrucian Fellowship Temple
- U.S. National Register of Historic Places
- U.S. Historic district
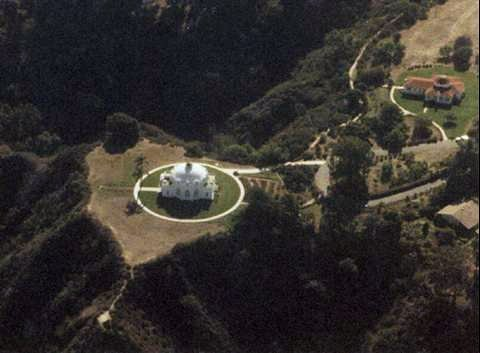
- The Ecclesia Healing Temple at Mount Ecclesia

- Location within San Diego County, California Location within California Location within the United States
- Location: Oceanside, California
- Built: 1920
- Architect: Lester A. Cramer
- Architectural style: Mission/Spanish revival, Greek/Roman styles
- NRHP reference No.: 95000390
- Added to NRHP: April 7, 1995

Mount Ecclesia (dedicated on October 28, 1911) is the location of the international headquarters of the fraternal and service organization the Rosicrucian Fellowship (TRF), located on grounds in Oceanside, California. It is also the location of its spiritual temple, called The Ecclesia, situated upon the promontory of a high mesa overlooking the San Luis Rey River Valley and the Franciscan Mission San Luis Rey de Francia.

On April 7, 1995, it was added to the National Register of Historic Places as the Rosicrucian Fellowship Temple.

== Construction ==
=== The vision ===
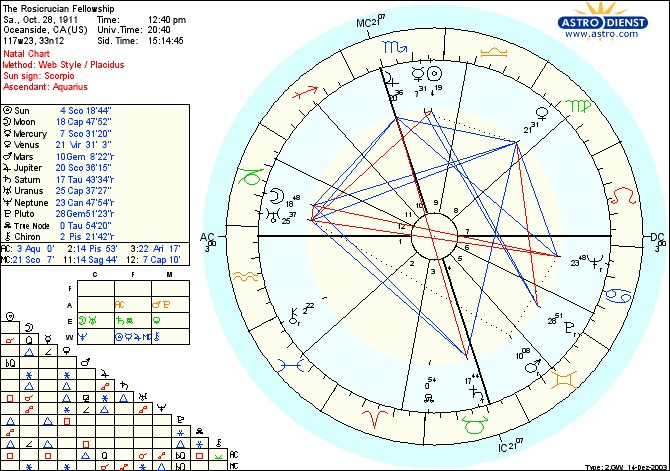
3rd Natal Chart of The Rosicrucian Fellowship at Mount Ecclesia (1911)

Mount Ecclesia was founded after Max Heindel, Founder of the Rosicrucian Fellowship (8/08/1909) reported to have contact with an anonymous figure identified as one of the Elder Brothers of the Rose Cross known as "The Teacher", who instructed that a permanent headquarters be established to support the twin mission of the Organization: to spread the Rosicrucian teachings, (the deeper Esoteric Christian Mysteries); and to heal the sick (according to the spiritual method delineated by the Order of the Rose Cross). On the winter solstice of 1910 The Teacher gave Max Heindel a spiritual vision of the location through "Jupiter Consciousness/picture consciousness/spiritual vision/telepathy" with the mission to find it and start the work.

=== Finding the location ===
After months of unfruitful search along the Pacific coast between Los Angeles and San Diego California, the Heindels decided, on April 30, 1911, to go visit the famous Franciscan Mission San Luis Rey de Francia, founded in 1798 in Oceanside by Junipero Serra the Franciscan friar from Spain. On their way there by horse and buggy, they stumbled on the location matching the vision given earlier by The Teacher and discovered that the land was for sale. Mr. Heindel interrupted the trip to the Franciscan mission to return to the real estate office to buy the land. But the sign on the real estate office door said "Office closed to reopen on Wednesday May 3". On May 3, 1911, they returned with their friend Mr. Patterson to Oceanside to buy the land. Shortly after 3.00 pm (at 3.05 pm) Mr. Heindel signed the deed of purchase and secured it with a down payment. They went home to Ocean Park and the same evening Mr. Heindel named the property Mount Ecclesia.

=== Groundbreaking ===
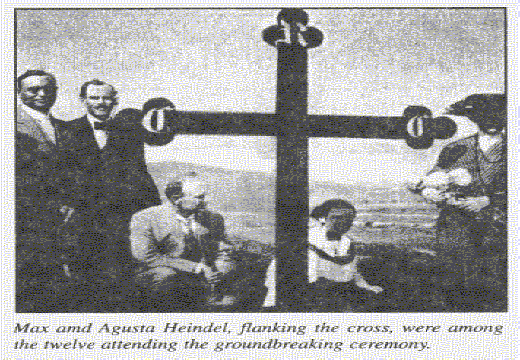
Among those gathered at the ceremony around C.R.C., the Founders' Cross, there were reported three invisible leaders, beyond the stage of ordinary humanity, and nine members of the Rosicrucian Fellowship.

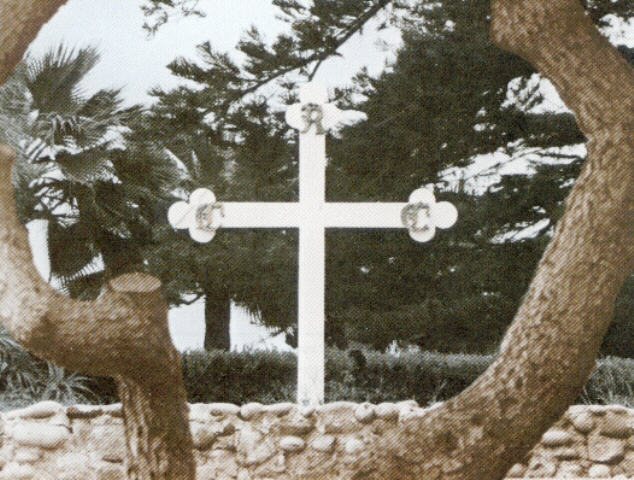
The Teacher later suggested to Max Heindel that the Founders' Cross be changed to white in order to avoid unfortunate associations.

It took them six months to get ready to leave their cottage in Ocean Park. They finally came down to fellowship's new headquarters on the 40 acres (about 16.19 hectares) land of Mount Ecclesia to dedicate it to the "Great Work of the Elder Brothers of the Rose Cross". The dedication ceremony was planned for 12.40 PM on October 28, 1911, in Oceanside, California.

Mount Ecclesia was launched that day, through a ceremony of ground-breaking which consisted in planting a large Cross with the initials C.R.C. — representing the symbolical name Christian Rose Cross, who is the Head of the Order of the Rose Cross (Rosicrucian Order) — painted in gilt letters on the trefoils of the three upper arms and with a climbing rose. An excerpt of the first-hand description of the mentioned event is as following :

On the 27th, Mrs. Heindel and I started for Oceanside, nearly exhausted from the strain of packing and moving. The first rain of the season was falling, and we felt some apprehension concerning the effect on the ceremony; but as we looked toward the almost cloud-hidden mountains in the east, we beheld the largest, most glorious rainbow we had ever seen--a double rainbow in fact--and it's [sic] southern foot seemed to stand directly upon Mount Ecclesia.

Our responsibility to aid thousands of weary hearts to bravely bear their burdens has often seemed beyond our strength; yet always have we found our powers renewed by looking within; and this time it seemed as if all Nature wanted to cheer us and was saying: "Take courage, remember the Work is not yours but God's; trust entirely in Him; He will point the way." So we clasped hands and took heart with new strength to carry on the beautiful work of which Mount Ecclesia is to be the center.

The day of the ceremony was an ideal California day; the sun shone in a cloudless sky. Wherever we looked from Mount Ecclesia, ocean, valleys, and mountains seemed to smile. Both the workers and visiting members were enraptured with the incomparable beauty of the Headquarters site. Those present were: Annie R. Atwood, of San Diego; Ruth E. Beach, of Portland, Ore.; Rachel M. Cunningham, Rudolf Miller, and John Adams, of Los Angeles; George Kramer, of Pittsburgh, Pa.; Wm. M. Patterson, of Seattle, Wash.; Mrs. Heindel and myself.

At the appointed time I broke ground for the building. All helped to excavate for the cross, which was set by Wm. Patterson. Mrs. Heindel planted the rose, which was then watered by all present. May it grow, may it bloom, to adorn the nakedness of the cross and be an inspiration to purity of life that will cover all past sins, no matter how dark the life may have been.

=== Construction of The Ecclesia ===
The Ecclesia, the Healing Temple, was erected, for the purpose of affording more powerful means for the healing of disease, and dedicated on December 25, 1920. The project for the building of the Temple had started in 1914. Heindel, who died in 1919, did not live to see the Temple completed in 1920. His wife, Agusta Foss Heindel, remained active in civic engagement, promoting the Fellowship and working to beautify Oceanside until her death in 1949. Spiritual Healing meetings are held in this holy place at a regular time each day by the Probationers who have consecrated their lives to this work. The architect of the building was Lester A. Cramer.

As in all the solar temples, The Ecclesia portal is facing east (the rising sun). In front of the portal stand two palm trees. The portal is constituted by a triangular-shaped pediment upon two round columns. At the centre of the pediment, there is an equilateral triangle, symbol of Trinity, inscribed by "the eye of God."

The columns fuse Greek (Ionic, Doric and Corinthian) and Roman (Tuscan and composite) styles, each one with a capital crowned by a finial globe. There are three steps between the columns leading to the Temple entrance. At the Temple entrance there are two square pilasters, each showing two faces. The round 12-sided building architecture is composed by round arches and narrow round inward windows. Its great dome is composed by a cupola crowned by a golden globe with a finial of lights. The inner portal and the Temple's interior is ornamented with alchemical and astrological symbols. It is a solar temple dedicated to the coming Age of Aquarius.

On June 29, 1920 (from 11:55 A. M. until 12:02 P. M.), the vision of an event of Spiritual nature at ground's site was reported as following:

Around or over the place where the ground was being broken for the Ecclesia were four large search lights. They faced north, south, east, and west. The one facing south seemed to be situated about seven feet from the one facing north. The same was true of the two facing east and west. This made a circle, the diameter of which was about seven feet.

The faces of the search lights appeared about twelve inches in diameter. The one facing south was the first to radiate light, next the one to the east, then the west, and lastly the one facing north. The light was pure white and radiated in such a way that at about fifty paces the rays from each fused with those to either side of it, so that beyond this point all space was flooded with a light of great brilliancy.

Then from out the place where the ground was broken, within the circle made by the search-lights a rich golden colored cloud formed. It grew rapidly and after passing and enclosing the search lights, it tinted every ray emanating therefrom. Then all that was brilliantly white became softened and mellowed, and the whole space became an entrancing vision. At this moment a rainbow over-arched the place, one end resting upon the ground to the east, the other upon the ground to the west. In another moment beneath the arched rainbow out from where the ground was broken and from whence the cloud of gold had come, came a cloud of blue, the Ray of the Father, the Healing Ray; it enveloped the earth and filled the firmament. Then all passed away. At this instant in our midst appeared the All-Seeing Eye. Then it vanished and our prayers ceased, our purpose having been accomplished.

On July 23, 1920 (at noon), during the laying of the cornerstone in the north-eastern corner of the temple, the purpose of The Ecclesia was stated in accordance to the commands of Christ, namely, "Preach the gospel and heal the sick":

This work of Christian spiritual healing is one of the methods of serving suffering humanity, by offering to the true physician a means of uniting the power of science with that of religion. The Rosicrucian Fellowship calls out to the TRUE physician, the physician who is not ashamed to pray for his patients while he works for them. Christ Jesus said, "I am THE WAY, THE TRUTH, and THE LIFE." Yet how many physicians and sorely suffering patients have neglected to invite Him to help. There is a way to invoke that divine outpouring, just as there is a way for doing each thing we do. That WAY demands preparation, purification, dedication, consecration, and that is part of the work of the Rosicrucian.

== Spiritual and healing services ==
Nearly since its inception the Fellowship has been providing the service of spiritual healing; the first service took place on June 23, 1914. On December 25, 1938, the Rosicrucian Fellowship opened a Sanitarium building which was used for a number of years to treat patients with non-contagious diseases. Currently, the healing applications are received by the Fellowship's centers worldwide or directly by the healing department at Mount Ecclesia.

Over the years, the group built a number of structures on the property, including an administration building in 1913, a chapel in 1914, a guesthouse and healing center in 1938, and a business office and cottages in the 1960s and 1970s. Max Heindel, the founder of the Rosicrucian Fellowship, had a dream, yet to be concretized, of a beautiful Grecian theatre envisioned to be built in the canyon below the chapel and in which performances would be given of plays with a spiritual message and occult truths such as the great dramas of Shakespeare and other inspired classics; as well as of the Fellowship's own splendid orchestra composed of permanent students, that it would perform in the theatre works of master composers, particularly those of Beethoven and Wagner whom he knew to be high musical Initiates, and also that classes in initiatory music would be taught there.

The Fellowship runs its own printing press, established by Max Heindel in 1912, which is an area of great activity with hundreds of products being produced: printing the ephemerides, the books (with millions spread worldwide), most of the course materials sent to the members, the periodical Echoes from Mount Ecclesia (which became the Rays from The Rosy Cross in July 1915), the pamphlets (in six languages) that are distributed freely to people and many other various things, such as flyers, brochures, postcards, posters, etc., that are necessary for the diffusion of the Rosicrucian Christian teachings, the Gospel of the coming Age of Aquarius. The organization generated so much mail that the federal government built the city's first post office on Seagaze Drive in 1936 to keep up with the demand.

The historic district of Mount Ecclesia, home to the Rosicrucian Fellowship, is noted for its architecture and the preservation of nature grounds and gardens, which include walking paths. Accommodation and vegetarian meals are also provided during the winter and summer school activities.

== Financial model ==
The Rosicrucian Fellowship observes the basic condition, set by its founder Max Heindel, that no price, membership dues or fees, should be put on its teachings, and never to ask for money for membership, for information, for education, nor for healing. The Fellowship has always balanced along the edge of the subsistence level with its funding and maintenance being achieved through the voluntary giving of members and friends, legacies, book-sale profits, housing rentals and cafeteria income and with the assistance of volunteer workers. By setting the example and through self-discipline, Mount Ecclesia seeks : «to unite and harmonize each with the others by teaching a religion that is both scientific and artistic, and to gather all churches into one great Christian Brotherhood.»

== Gallery ==
Exterior views of the Ecclesia
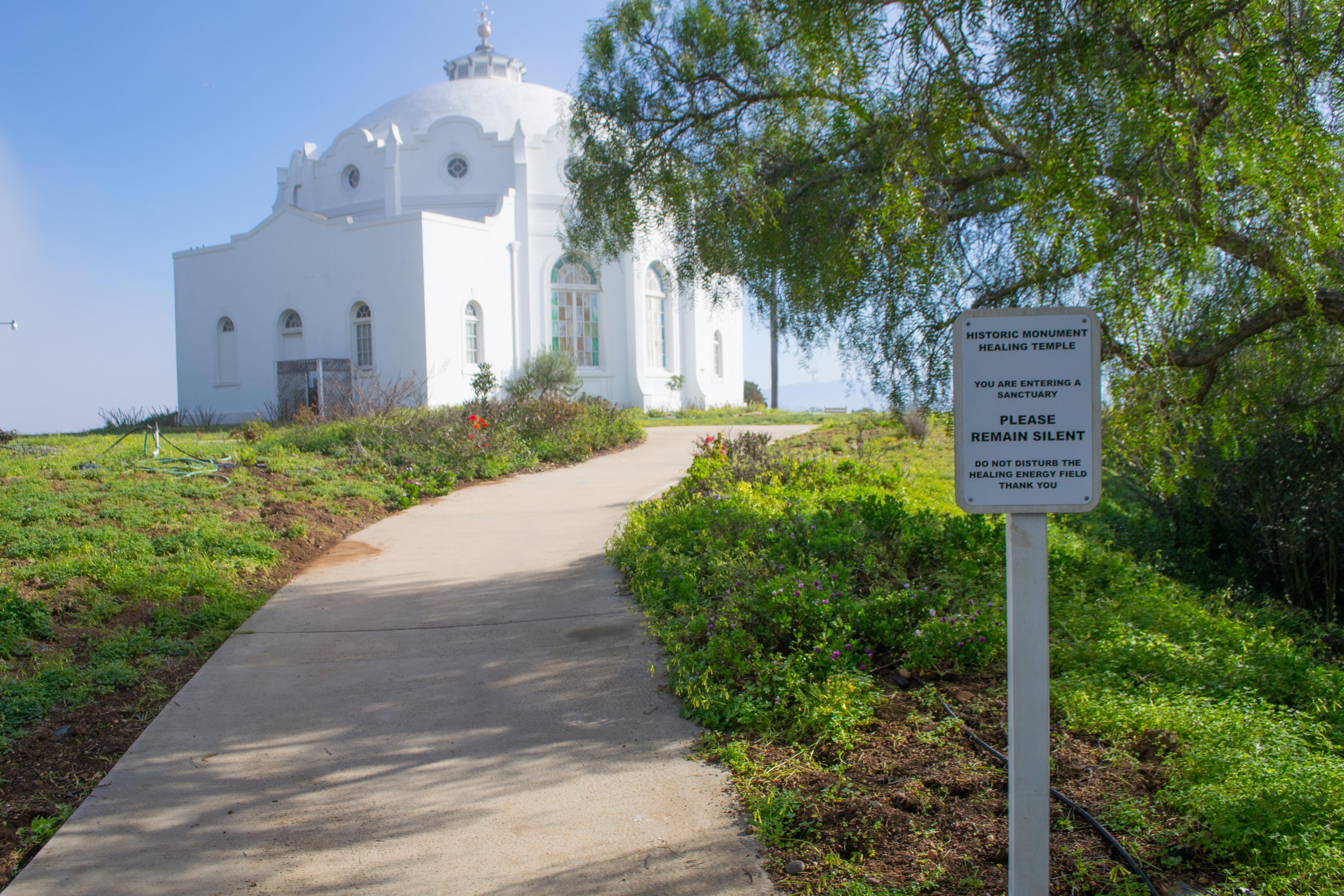
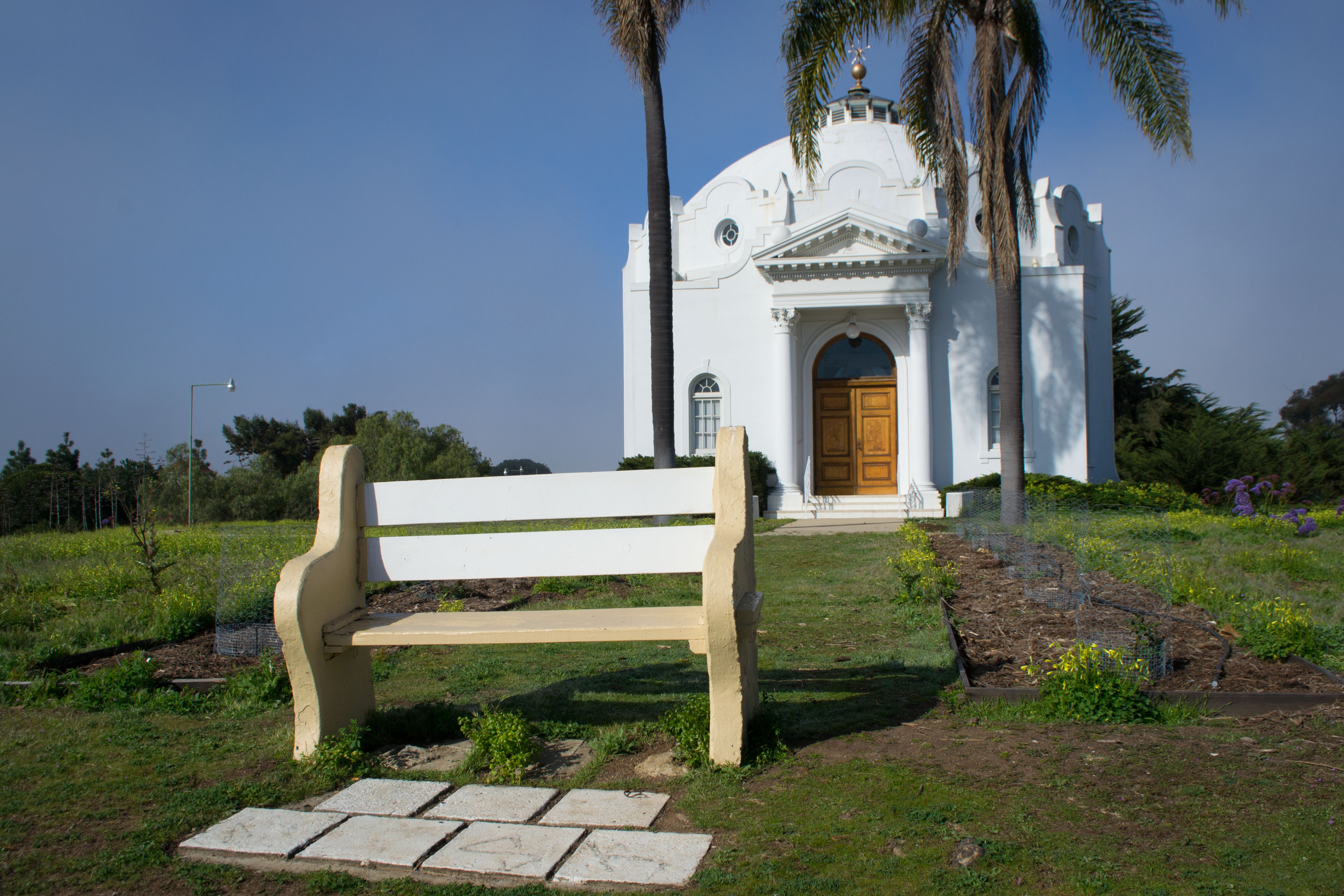
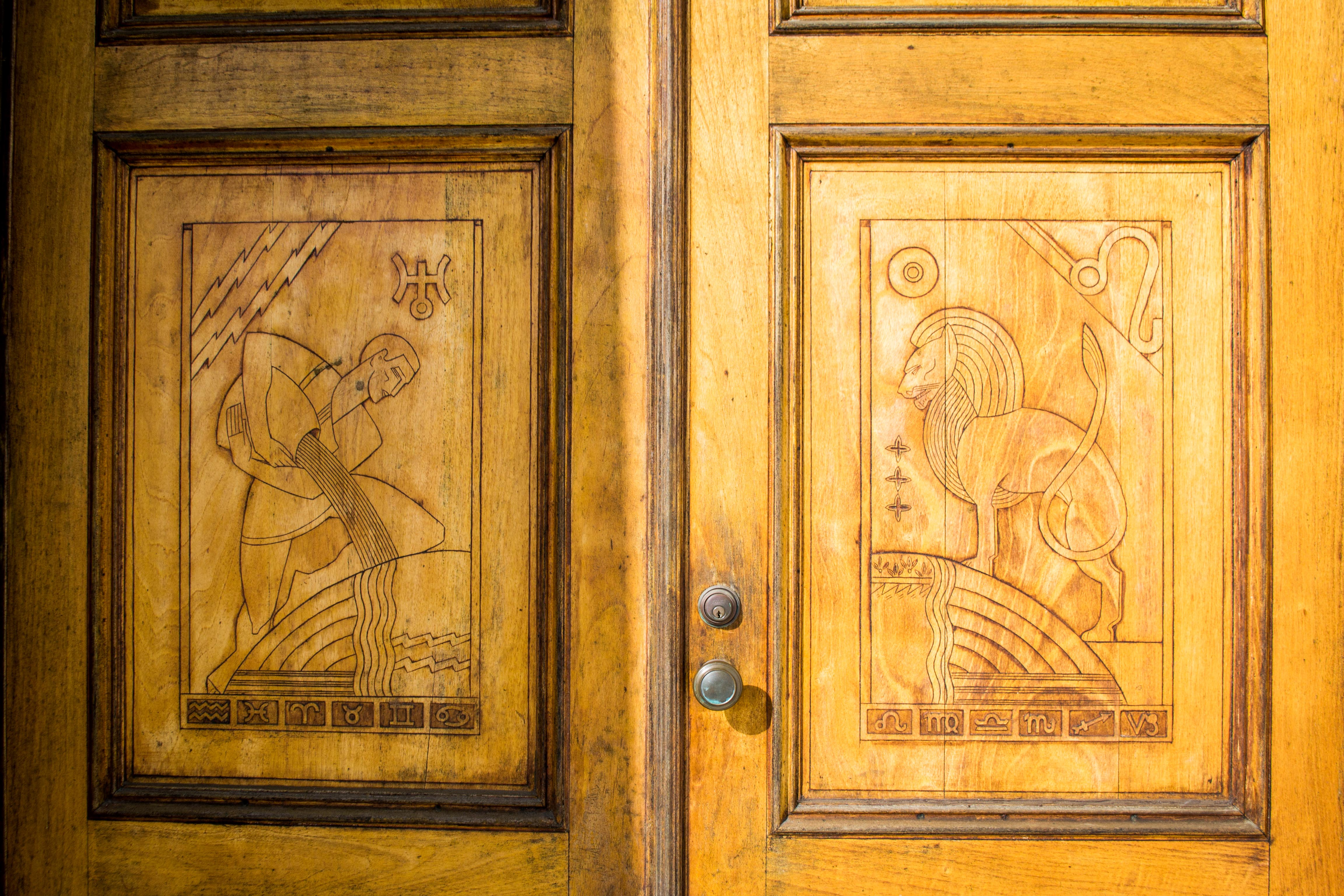

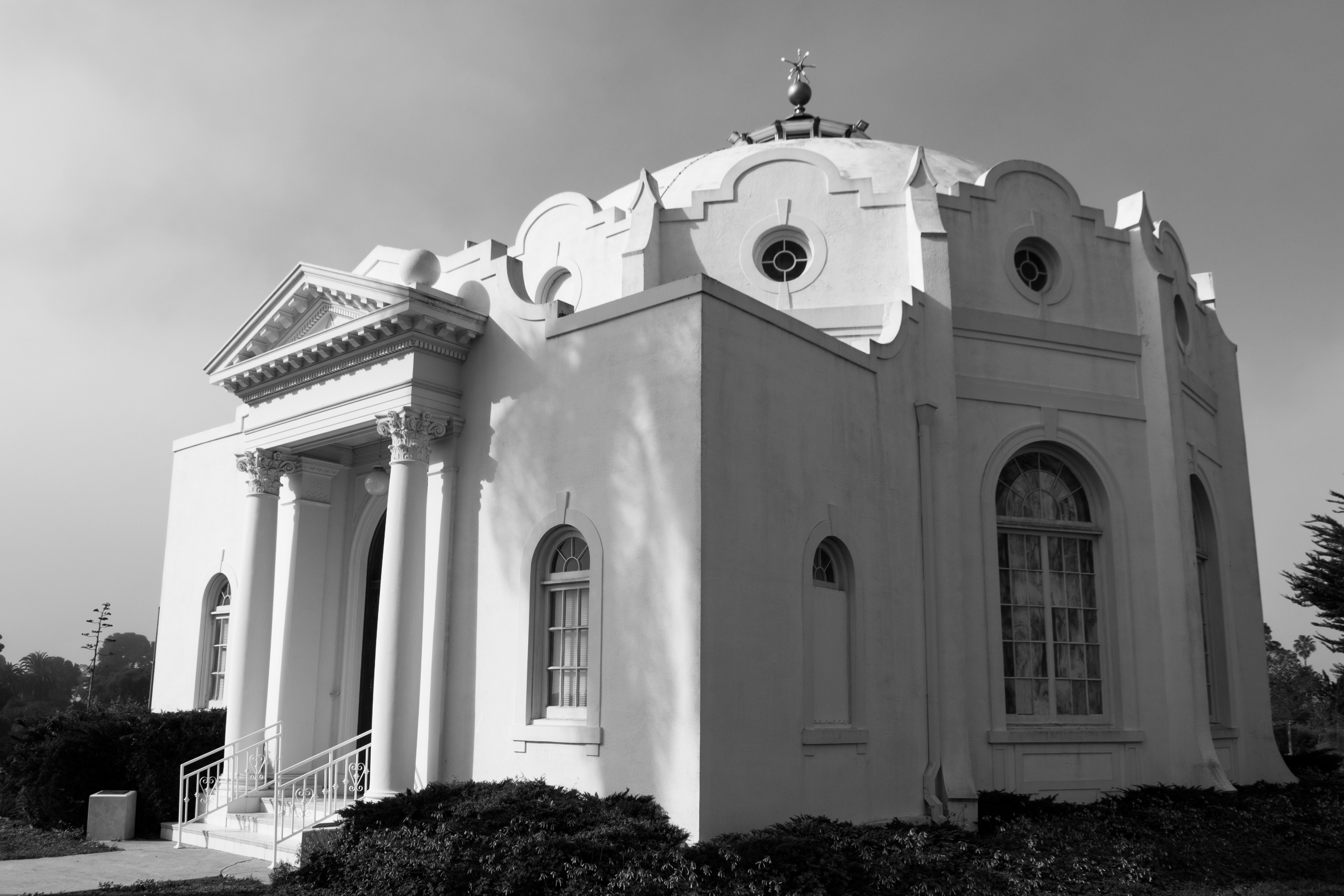
The Ecclesia facing east (the rising sun)

== See also ==
- Esoteric Christianity
- New Galilee and the New Jerusalem
- The Rosicrucian Cosmo-Conception
