= Annella Zervas =

American Benedictine nun (1900–1926)

Servant of God Sister Mary Annella Zervas OSB
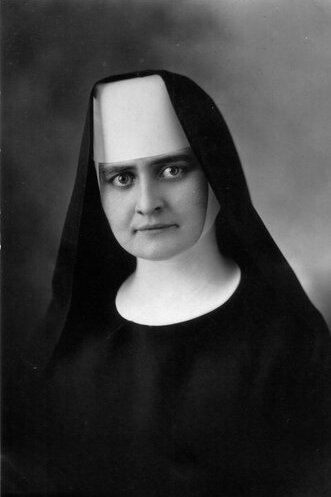
- Sister Annella in an undated photo

Personal life
- Born: Anna Cordelia Zervas; April 7, 1900
- Died: August 14, 1926 (aged 26)

Mary Annella Zervas, O.S.B. (born Anna Cordelia Zervas; April 7, 1900 – August 14, 1926) was an American Catholic religious sister who joined the Benedictines and died at 26 after a three-year battle with pityriasis rubra pilaris. Until the 1960s, Zervas's grave in St. Joseph, Minnesota, was considered a place of Christian pilgrimage, and it became one again around 2008.

On October 15, 2023, Bishop Andrew Cozzens of Crookston announced that he was beginning an inquiry into her life that could lead to the opening of a cause for her canonization. The US bishops voted to approve the cause on November 12, 2024, and it formally opened on October 9, 2025.

== Early life ==
Zervas was born Anna Cordelia Zervas in Moorhead, Minnesota, on April 7, 1900. Her father, Hubert Zervas, an immigrant from the village of Immekeppel in the German Empire, was a butcher and ran a local meat market. Her mother, Emma (née Levitre) Zervas, was born in Saint-Theodore-d'Acton, Quebec, Canada.

Zervas was raised in a large family that attended St. Joseph Catholic Church in Moorhead, where her father was the choir director and a member of the Knights of Columbus. At the time, the parochial school at St. Joseph's was looked after by monks and Sisters of the Benedictine Order. According to Alfred Mayer, who was then pastor of the parish, Zervas:

sought only to please God and do His Holy Will in all things, and thence labored but for God's honor and glory. ... It was during the summer vacation of 1915 that she one day called on me and expressed to me her desire of going to the convent at St. Joseph and becoming a sister. I told her that I thought she had a religious vocation and advised her to carry out her holy design. She seemed to be so convinced of her religious vocation that she expressed no doubts or fears regarding it. After I had spoken some words of encouragement and explained to her, in short, the excellence of the religious state, she left happy and contented.

Zervas's parents were reportedly very reluctant to part with her at such a young age, but Mayer advised them, "Don't put anything in her way; she is not too young to give herself to God." Several years later, Hubert Zervas wrote that he and his wife had then "gladly consented to give back the child to Him from Whom they had received her".

== Benedictine Order ==
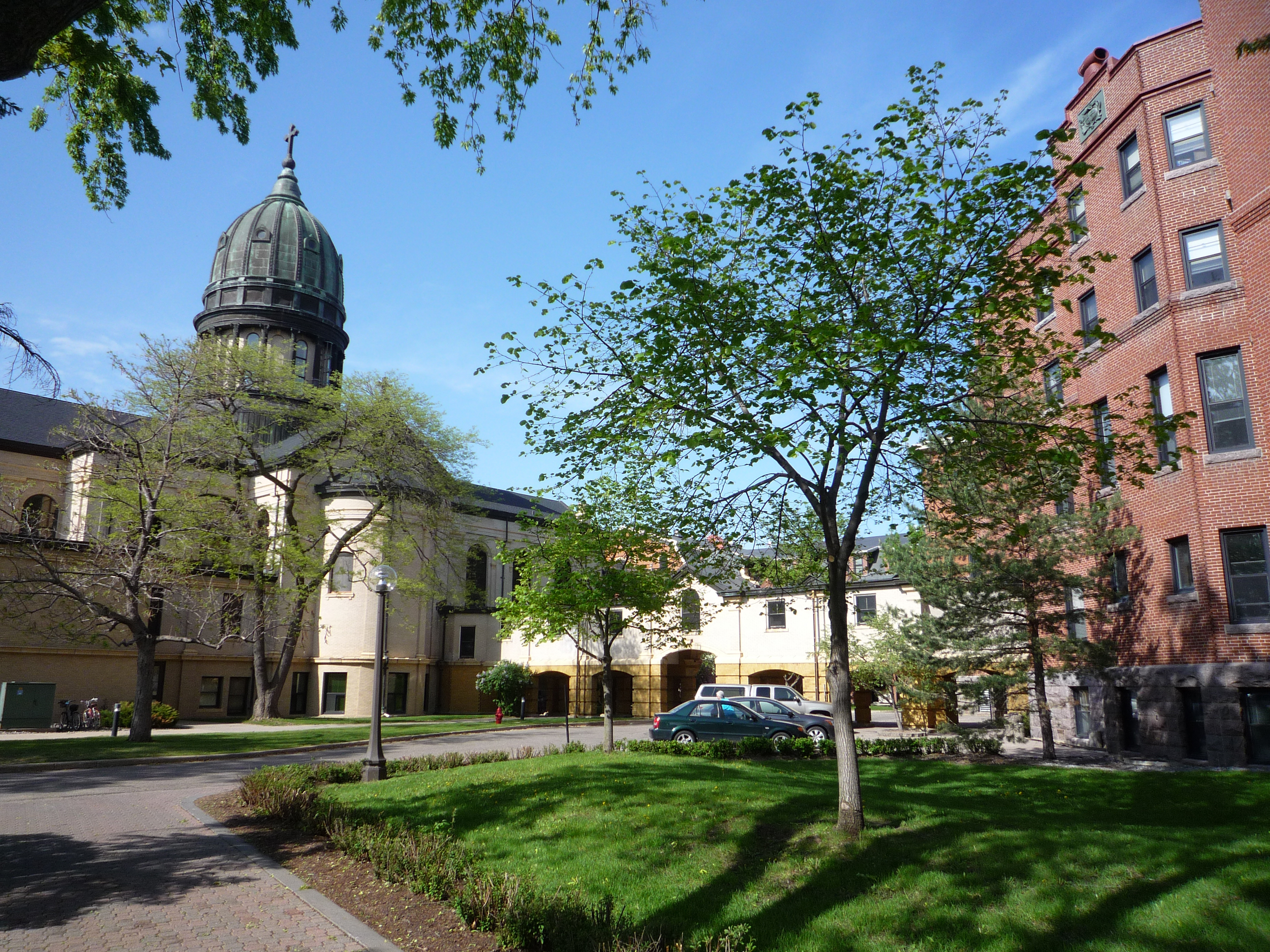
St.Benedict's Monastery

Saint Benedict's Monastery accepted Zervas as a postulant in 1915, and she entered the novitiate in 1918. She is remembered as a quiet and unassuming member of the community who was fond of reading Geert Groote's The Following of Christ.

On June 17, 1918, Zervas received the habit and her new religious name in a ceremony conducted by Joseph Francis Busch, the bishop of the Diocese of St. Cloud. According to James Kritzeck, "This was the day which Anna had so eagerly awaited; in a simple, beautiful ceremony, she exchanged an elegant bridal gown for the severe religious habit.... Anna rushed to tell her parents her new religious name, Sister Mary Annella. Her mother remarked, not unkindly, 'But there is no Saint Annella,' to which Sister Annella, concealing her slight disappointment at this reaction to the name by which she would henceforth be known, replied, 'Then I shall have to be the first one!'" She took her final vows in 1922 and was assigned as a music teacher and organist to St. Mary's Convent in Bismarck, North Dakota.

== Affliction ==
In the summer of 1923, Zervas noticed a small reddish-brown patch on her arm that itched terribly, and her body began to swell.

In April 1924, her parents were summoned to her hospital bedside. Initially, her mother didn't recognize her. According to the nun Mary De' Pazzi Zervas, "Her hair was nearly all gone and her face looked terrible, blotchy." After their shock wore off, her parents remained with her two days.

In June 1924, Zervas was transferred to the Mayo Clinic in Rochester, Minnesota, where she was diagnosed with Pityriasis Rubra Pilaris, for which there was at the time no cure or specific treatment. According to Brendan D. King:

P.R.P., as it is known for short, is an inherited disease usually passed down from parent to child. In the most serious cases, the skin becomes overactive and is unable to regenerate. The blood vessels dilate, which causes the body to hemorrhage moisture. This leaves the weakened immune system quite vulnerable to secondary infections. In some cases, P.R.P. can be fatal. After her diagnosis, Sister Annella was transferred to Worrell Hospital, where skin diseases were treated. She was given a great deal of rest and fed a special diet consisting mainly of fish and vegetables. Every one of her nurses expressed revulsion at the task of changing her bandages and asked to be reassigned. There was little improvement, however. Sister Annella's skin had grown so sensitive that lukewarm water seemed scalding hot. By the beginning of June, a grayish purple coloring began spreading outward from her face. Even hot packs could not stop her teeth from chattering. With the period of examination over, Sister Annella was transferred to St. Raphael's Hospital in St. Cloud.

Dermatologist Elizabeth Blixt has suggested that it is possible that Zervas's underlying illness may have led to erythroderma, a complication that could have contributed to her death.

Erythroderma causes the entire body to become red and inflamed, and the skin often becomes flaky. What can happen is that [erythroderma] messes with the body's heat regulators. It can cause the body to lose a lot of heat, which makes you more susceptible to infections. It can also cause electrolyte imbalances that can lead to other things, like heart arrhythmia.

During her worst fits of pain, Zervas would repeat, "Yes, Lord, send me more pain, but give me strength to bear it."

== Decline and death ==
In the summer of 1924, Hubert and Emma Zervas visited Louise Walz, the abbess of St. Benedict's. When it became apparent that her condition was terminal, Zervas was taken home to Moorhead. Walz was kept apprised of Zervas's condition and the nuns of Moorhead visited regularly.

In the fall, dieting and osteopathic treatments brought about a remission of Zervas's symptoms. Her family was certain that it was only a matter of time until Zervas fully recovered, but Zervas was unconvinced. She told her mother, "When this disease leaves me, God will have taken it away and he will not want me to have it anymore. I do not want anything but what God wills." She also said, "What He has in store for me, I do not know, but all He does is well, so there is no need to worry. God has given me the grace to be resigned, and I thank him heartily for this, but also for all else He has given me with my illness.... I often wonder what great harm of body or of soul I may have suffered had not God given me this 'blessing in disguise'."

In the summer of 1926, Zervas was attacked by a fit of pain immediately after leaving the confessional. Over the following days, the disease and its symptoms returned in full force. As a novena was offered for her at Our Lady of Victory Basilica in Lackawanna, New York, her condition seemed to enter its final phase. Death occurred at 3:15 a.m. on the Vigil of the Feast of the Assumption of the Blessed Virgin Mary, August 14, 1926. After a requiem Mass at her parents' parish church in Moorhead, Zervas's remains were transported to St. Benedict's and buried in its cemetery.

== Legacy ==
According to a 1989 newspaper article:

By 1927, there were a few reports of people who had been cured of illnesses through [Zervas's] intercession. By 1929, the St. Paul Daily News reported, "There have been hundreds of cures effected, thousands seek relief at her grave, and thousands write for information about her life." By 1930, several women were requesting that their sick children sleep in her deathbed in hopes of a cure. In 1932, a woman claimed that she had taken a vine from her grave, put it in water, used the water in a bath, and was relieved of a painful backache. By the 1940s, there was a rumor that the grass on her grave stays green year-round because she was so holy.

Within seven months of her burial, Bishop Joseph Busch was hearing rumors of cures and favors granted by Zervas's intercession. He asked Bendictine priest Alexius Hoffmann of St. John's Abbey to collect information on "the circumstances of her sickness and death and the origin and progress of the cultus, if any, in her regard and any evidences there may be of miraculous intervention through her intercession".

In April 1927, Hoffman reported to Busch that five cures had been reported. He also submitted a biographical sketch by Zervas's parents. While there is no evidence that Busch took further steps in the case, devotion to Zervas spread through the efforts of her father and a priest from St. John's Abbey, Joseph Kreuter, who wrote a short sketch of Zervas's life, An Apostle of Suffering in Our Day, which first appeared in the Josephinum Weekly, published at that time in Columbus, Ohio, and was reprinted in other Catholic publications. It was reissued as a booklet in 1931 and subsequently printed in a number of translations. A second edition of the English booklet, published by Saint John's Abbey Press, followed in 1946. In 1957, James Kritzeck wrote, "Whatever may happen, everyone can pray to her and have confidence in her intercession."

According to a 1989 article for the Visitor, the official newspaper of the Roman Catholic Diocese of Saint Cloud: "While the St. Paul Daily News exaggerated when it reported that 'thousands' were visiting her grave, there were some pilgrims to the convent cemetery, and many of them took a handful of dirt from Sister Annella's grave for a souvenir. Interest in Sister Annella dwindled during the 1960s, but she still has some fans. At least one of them, no one seems to know who, puts flowers on her grave regularly."

According to journalist Vicki Ikeogu, local indifference to Sister Annella persisted until 2008, when St. Cloud-based freelance writer and historian Brendan D. King learned of her while volunteering in the Archive Room of the Stearns County Historical Society and began researching. According to Ikeogu, "Combing through archives within the monastery, King would uncover what he described as a compelling story on suffering and devotion to God. It was a story he published in December 2008 in the Catholic Family News."

When asked by Ikeogu why he thought interest in Sister Annella had disappeared in the 1960s, King cited the rapid cultural secularization of once overwhelmingly Catholic Central Minnesota after the Second Vatican Council, but added, "Sister Annella’s viewpoint on spirituality, the fact that suffering was not a curse, I think may have made a lot of people see her as strange. But I think God raises up saints for a reason and he also makes them known to us for a reason."

In 2010, Indian-American Catholic layman and Avon resident Patrick Norton learned of Sister Annella during a chance conversation with King in the vestibule of St. Anthony's Catholic Church in St. Cloud. Norton began mass-producing and giving away Zervas prayer cards and copies of Kreuter's pamphlet. He also began organizing local Catholics into monthly gatherings at the St. Benedict's Monastery Lourdes grotto and the nearby convent cemetery, during which the Divine Mercy Chaplet and the rosary are prayed for Zervas's canonization.

=== Formal cause for canonization ===
A spokesperson for Bishop Donald Joseph Kettler of the Diocese of St. Cloud announced that as of 2017, a cause for the canonization of Zervas had not been opened, nor was its opening anticipated. While the Benedictine sisters complied before the 1960s with requests for relics, pamphlets in multiple languages, and memorial cards, the convent has since embraced a policy discouraging efforts to promote the canonization of its deceased sisters. According to Sister Karen Rose, while the Benedictine Sisters do not oppose canonizations, "Under the Rule of St. Benedict, humility is a very central concept... The idea of promoting one of our own is really kind of alien to us."

On October 15, 2023, Bishop Andrew Cozzens of the Diocese of Crookston announced that preliminary steps were being taken to formally open Zervas's cause for canonization. The diocese has a website about Zervas and is forming a nonprofit guild encouraging devotion to her. In a letter, Cozzens thanked Norton for almost single-handedly reviving interest in Zervas.

On November 12, 2024, the US bishops voted to approve the cause's diocesan phase. The formal opening of the cause is scheduled for October 9, 2025, after Mass is celebrated at the Cathedral in Crookston.

== Folklore ==
- In Minnesota folklore, a persistent urban legend dating at latest to the 1940s is that, as a sign of her sanctity, snow does not fall on Sister Annella's grave and the ground above it does not freeze.
- In a 2008 interview with The Record, a newspaper published by the College of Saint Benedict and Saint John's University, local historian and folklorist Sister Owen Lindblad said that ghost stories about apparitions of Zervas near the convent cemetery to comfort depressed or grieving College of St. Benedict students in need of "a shoulder to cry on or a little advice" are commonly told. According to oral tradition, the convent cemetery is usually covered with mist right before Sister Annella appears.
