= Cathedral of the Immaculate Conception (Crookston, Minnesota) =

Church in Crookston, Minnesota, United States

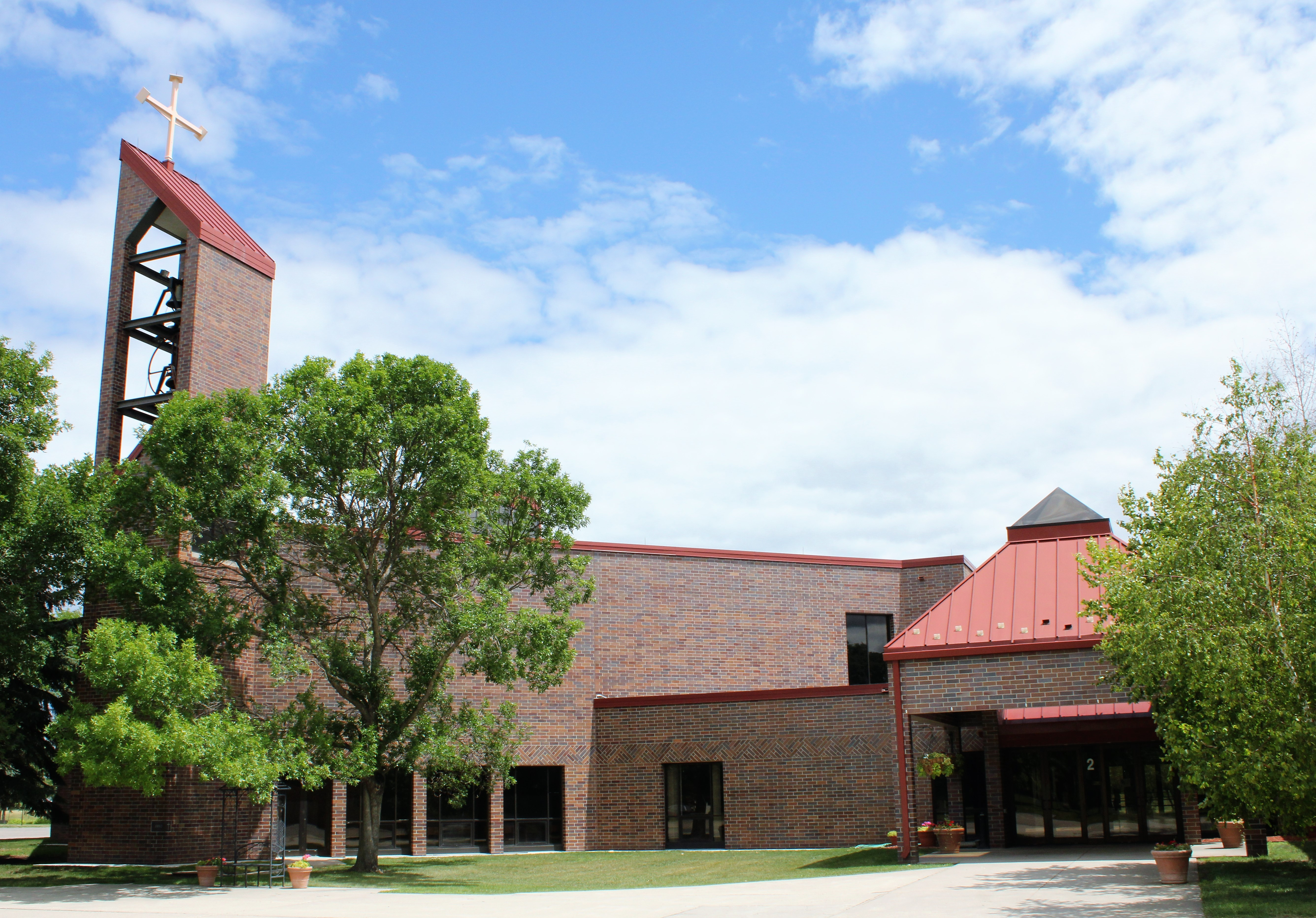
- Cathedral of the Immaculate Conception
- 47°46′31″N 96°35′23″W
- Location: 702 Summit Avenue; Crookston, Minnesota
- Country: United States
- Denomination: Roman Catholic
- Website: crookstoncathedral.com

History
- Status: Cathedral/Parish church
- Founded: 1830
- Dedication: Immaculate Conception
- Consecrated: 1990

Architecture
- Style: Modern
- Completed: 1990

Specifications
- Capacity: 1000
- Materials: Brick

Administration
- Diocese: Crookston

Clergy
- Bishop: Most Rev. Andrew H. Cozzens
- Rector: Very Rev. Joseph Richards
- Cathedral of the Immaculate Conception
- U.S. National Register of Historic Places
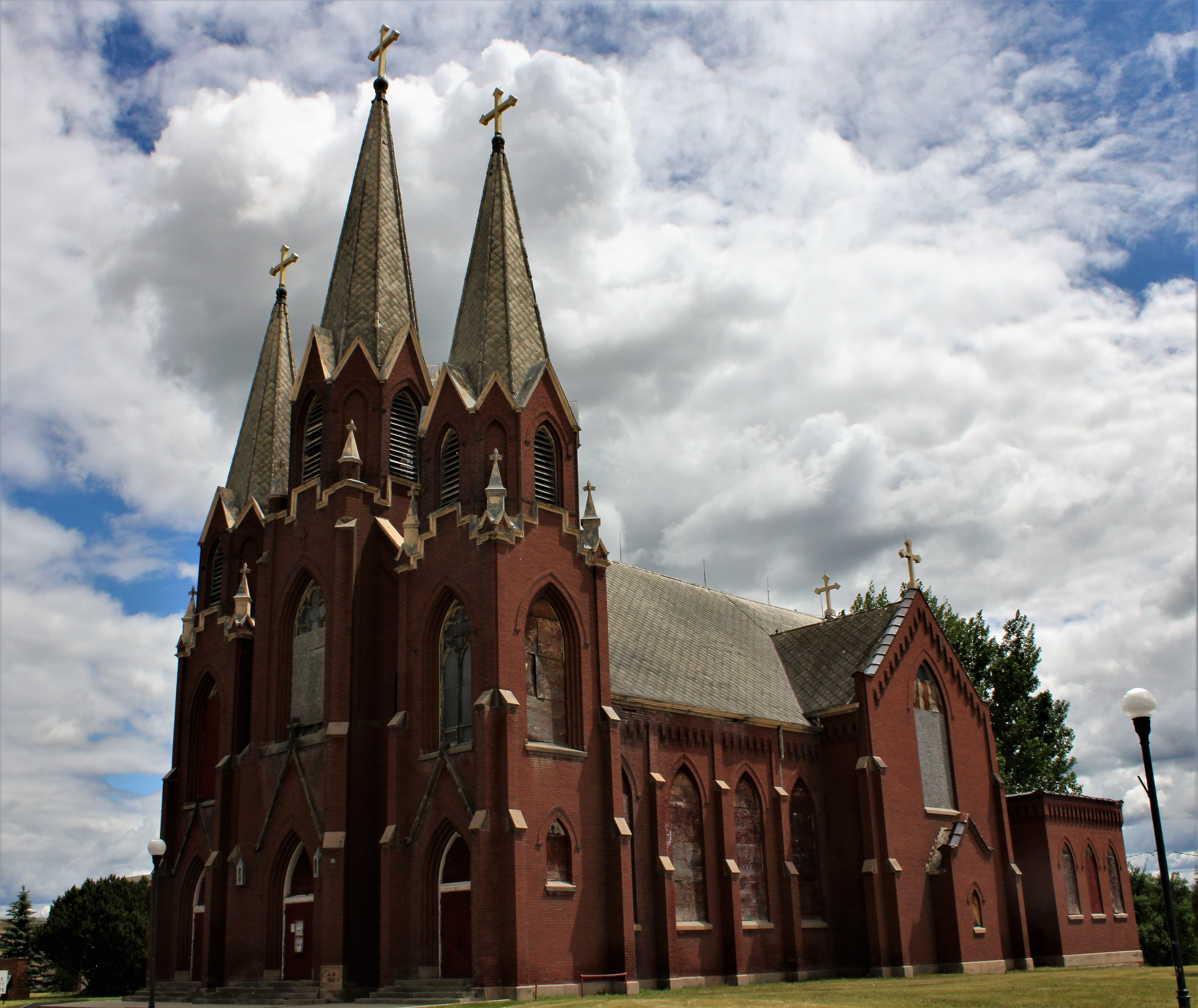
- Former cathedral
- Location: N. Ash St. at 2nd Ave.
- Coordinates: 47°46′27″N 96°36′15″W
- Built: 1912
- Architect: Bert Keck
- Architectural style: Late Gothic Revival
- NRHP reference No.: 98001219
- Added to NRHP: October 1, 1998

The Cathedral of the Immaculate Conception is a Catholic cathedral in Crookston, Minnesota, in the United States. It is the seat of the Diocese of Crookston.

== History ==
=== 1912 cathedral ===
In the beginning of the 20th century, Timothy J. Corbett, the first bishop of the newly formed Diocese of Crookston, began planning for a cathedral. He hired the American architect Bert D. Keck to design the building. On the interior, his plan included two balconies for antiphonal choir responses and a large choir balcony in the rear of the church for the choir and organ. On the exterior, the cathedral was given a Neo-Gothic facade with three spires.

Corbett laid the cornerstone for the new cathedral on June 16, 1912. it was dedicated on February 2, 1913 and the interior was completed in 1915. A renovation was performed on the cathedral in the 1950s that covered some of the original murals and frescoes. During the 1980s, the diocese began planning for a new cathedral. The diocese decided to place the structure on a property that was previously used by the Sisters of Mount St. Benedict.

The 1912 cathedral was added to the National Register of Historic Places on October 1, 1989.

=== 1990 cathedral ===
The second Cathedral of the Immaculate Conception was dedicated September 25, 1990. In October 2025, Bishop Andrew H. Cozzens celebrated a mass in the cathedral as the opening of the beatification cause of Sister Annella Zervas.

== Cathedral exterior ==
The new Cathedral of the Immaculate Conception is designed in the modern style. The cathedral's west bell tower features a shrine to the Holy Family.

=== Bell tower ===
The bell tower is the larger of the two towers at the cathedral. It houses three bells:

- The largest bell weighs 2,000 pounds (910 kg) and sounds the note of “F.” This bell came from the former St. Anne's Church in Crookston
- The next bell weighs 1,000 pounds (450 kg) and was donated by a parishioner
- The third bell weighs 750 pounds (340 kg) and was donated by the same parishioner

== Cathedral interior ==
=== Pipe organ ===
The cathedral pipe organ is an Opus 2132, manufactured by the Reuter Organ Company of Lawrence, Kansas. It is a two-manual, 31-rank instrument that contains approximately 1,789 pipes.

=== Blessed Sacrament Chapel ===
The Blessed Sacrament Chapel in the southwest corner of the cathedral houses the tabernacle, the reliquary, and a shrine to Our Lady of Guadeloupe.It was originally designed as a day chapel, but the parish repurposed it to allow worshippers to participate in perpetual adoration of the eucharist. The tabernacle was originally housed in the 1912 cathedral. The chapel contains the following pieces:

- An image of Divine Mercy, donated by the local Knights of Columbus
- An image of Our Lady of Guadalupe, designed in Mexico
- A statue of Our Lady of Fatima

=== Stations of the Cross ===
The 14 Stations of the Cross are located on the interior walls of the nave. They are mosaics made from Venetian-style colored glass tiles, imported from Italy.

=== Sanctuary ===
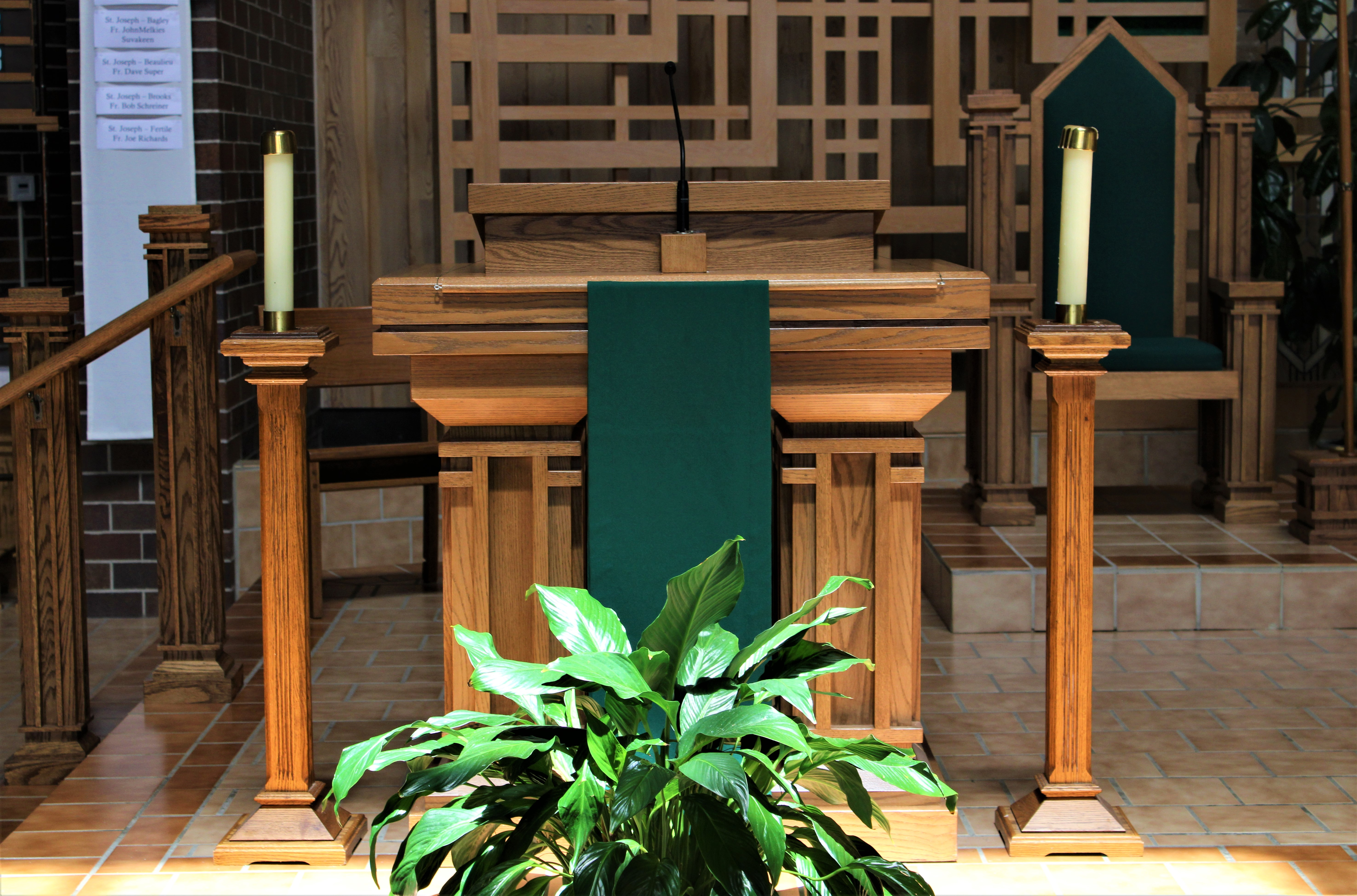
Altar (2021)

The altar, ambo and cathedra were all designed by the priest John Buscemi based on the Prairie School architectural style. The altar stone from the 1912 cathedral is attached to the underside of the newer altar. The back of the cathedra has a hand-stitched appliqué of Bishop Cozzen's coat of arms. The corpus on the crucifix was carved of basswood by the Art Demetz Studio of Gardena, Italy. The cross itself was constructed by a parishioner.

=== Baptismal font ===
The baptismal font, shaped like a cross, is designed for both adult and infant baptisms. it is set off by a perimeter of red floor tiles.

=== Devotional stations ===
The interior of the two cathedral towers have devotional stations for worshippers:

- The Holy Family station is located in west tower. It contains statues of the Virgin Mary and St. Joseph, along with a crucifix. All three pieces came from the 1912 cathedral and were hand-cavered in Oberammergau, Germany.
- The St. Anne station is located in the east tower. It contains a statue of St. Anne from St. Anne's Church in Crookston.
Images of 1990 cathedral

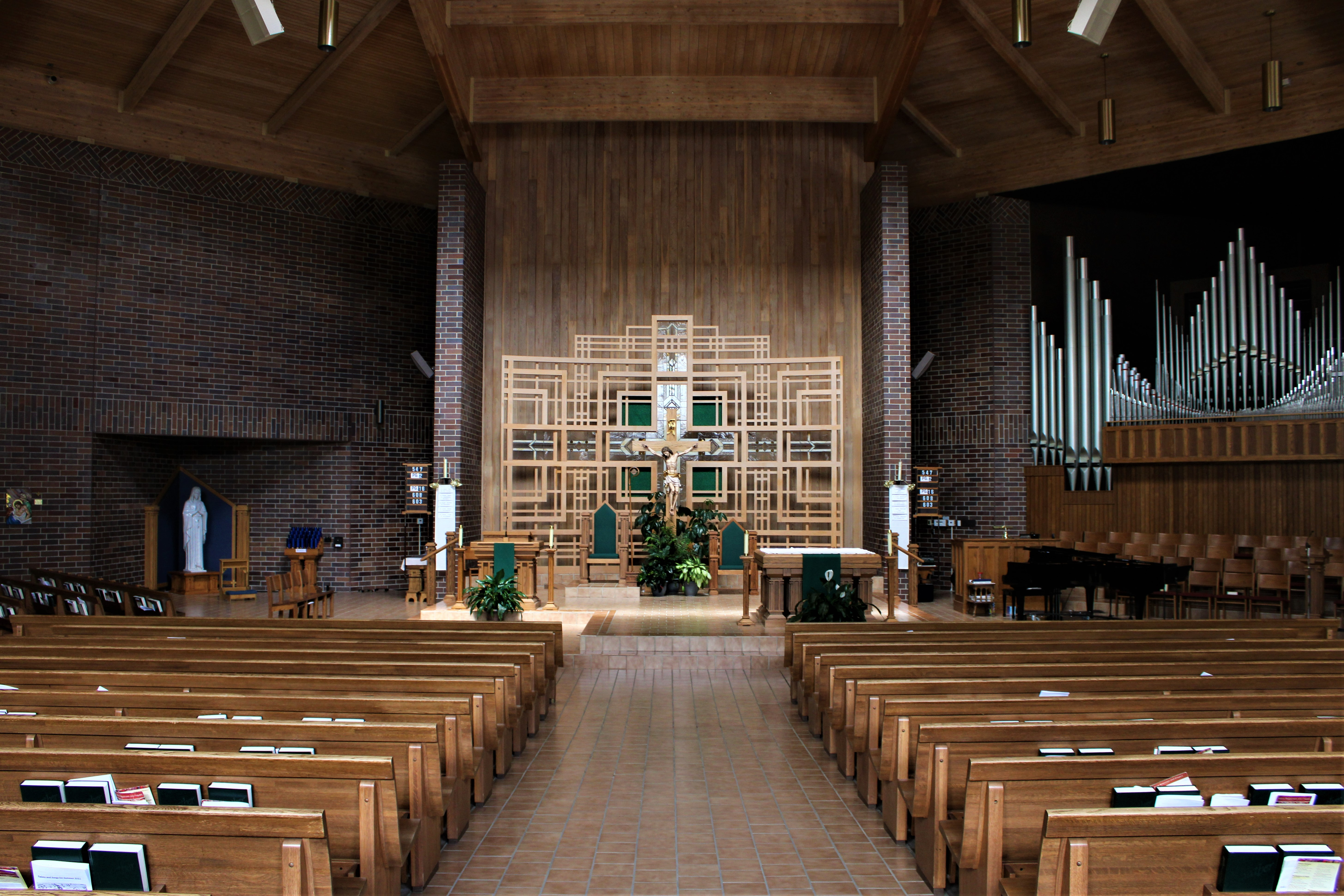
View of the chancel (2021)

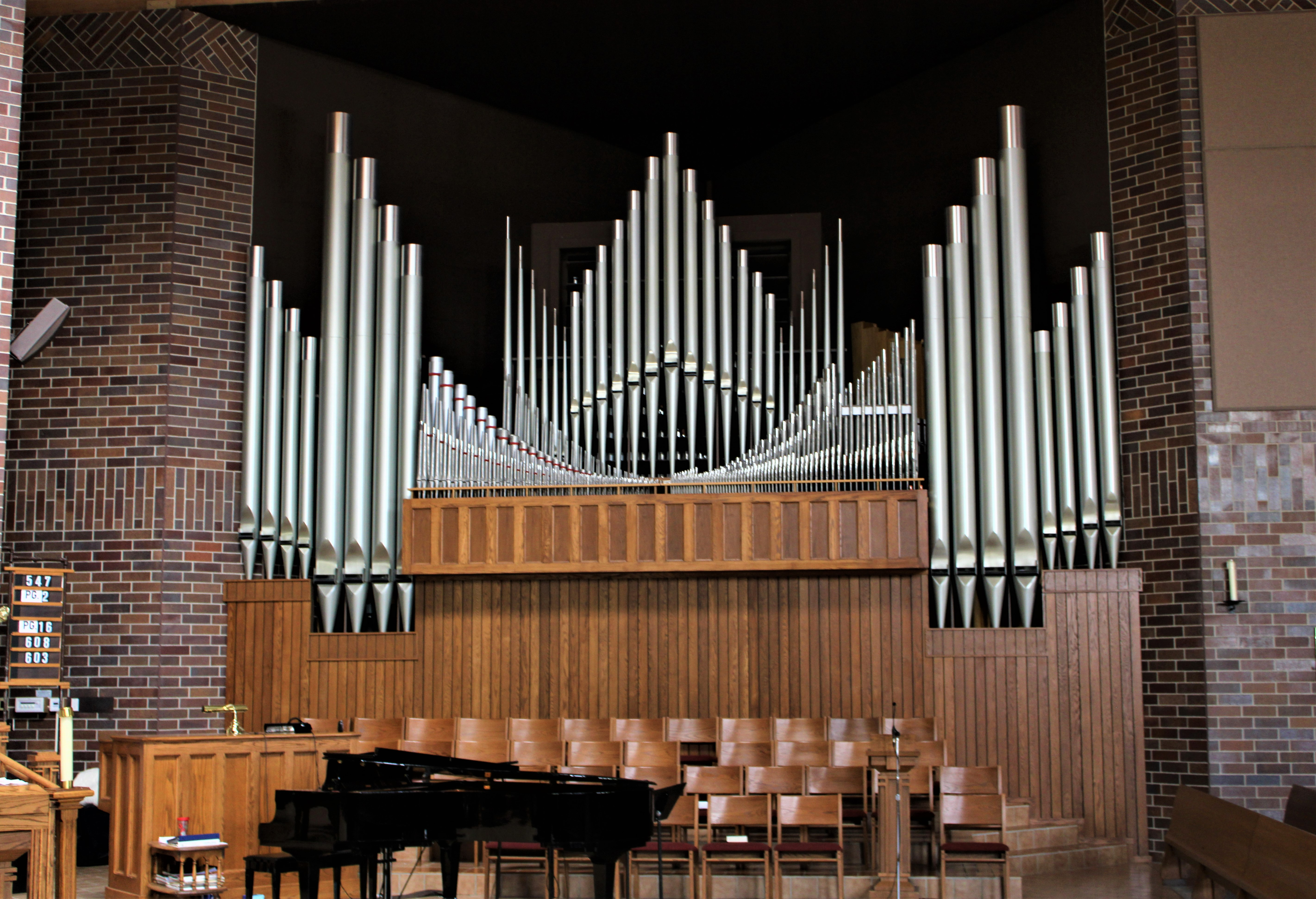
Pipe organ (2021)

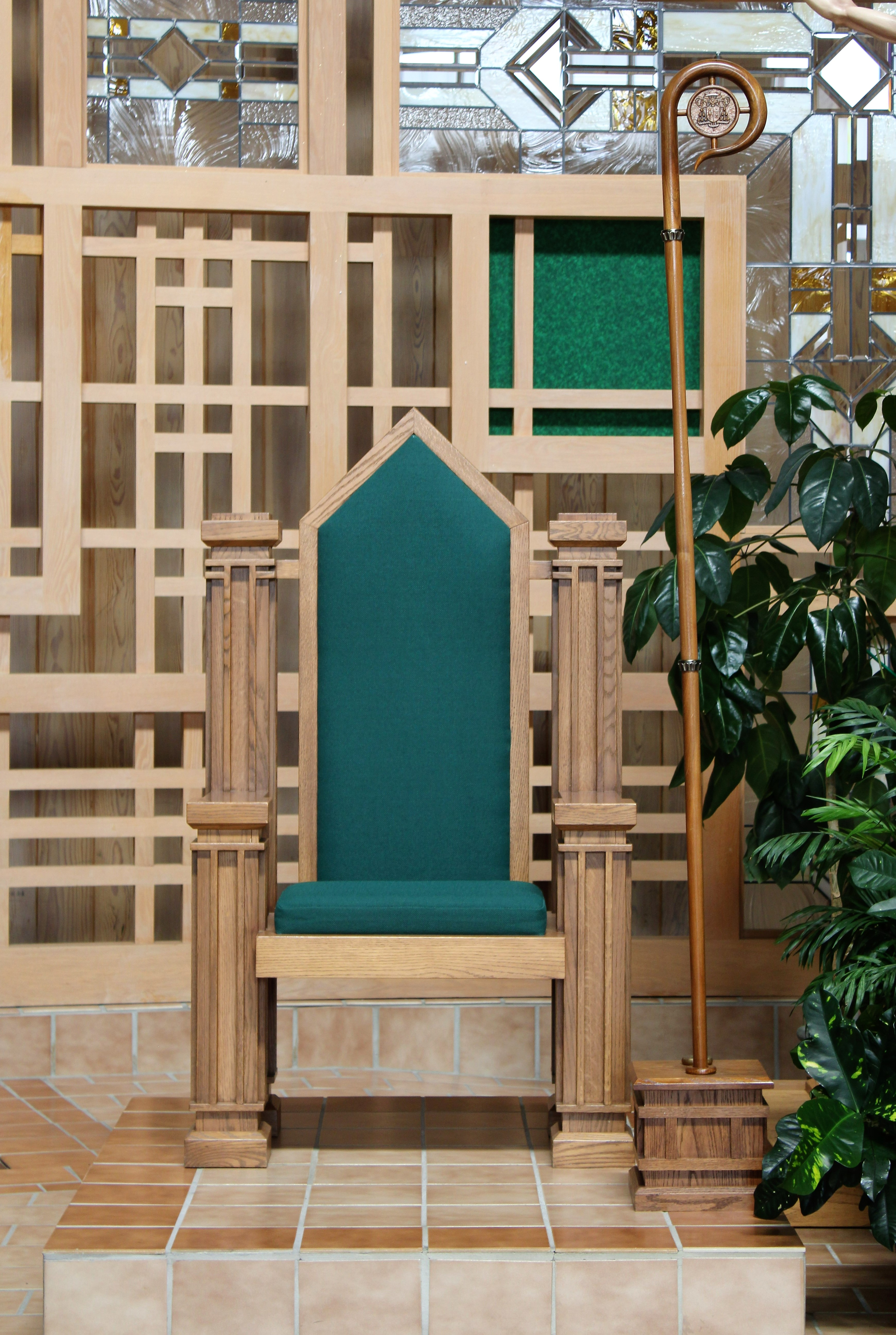
Cathedra (bishop's seat) (2021)

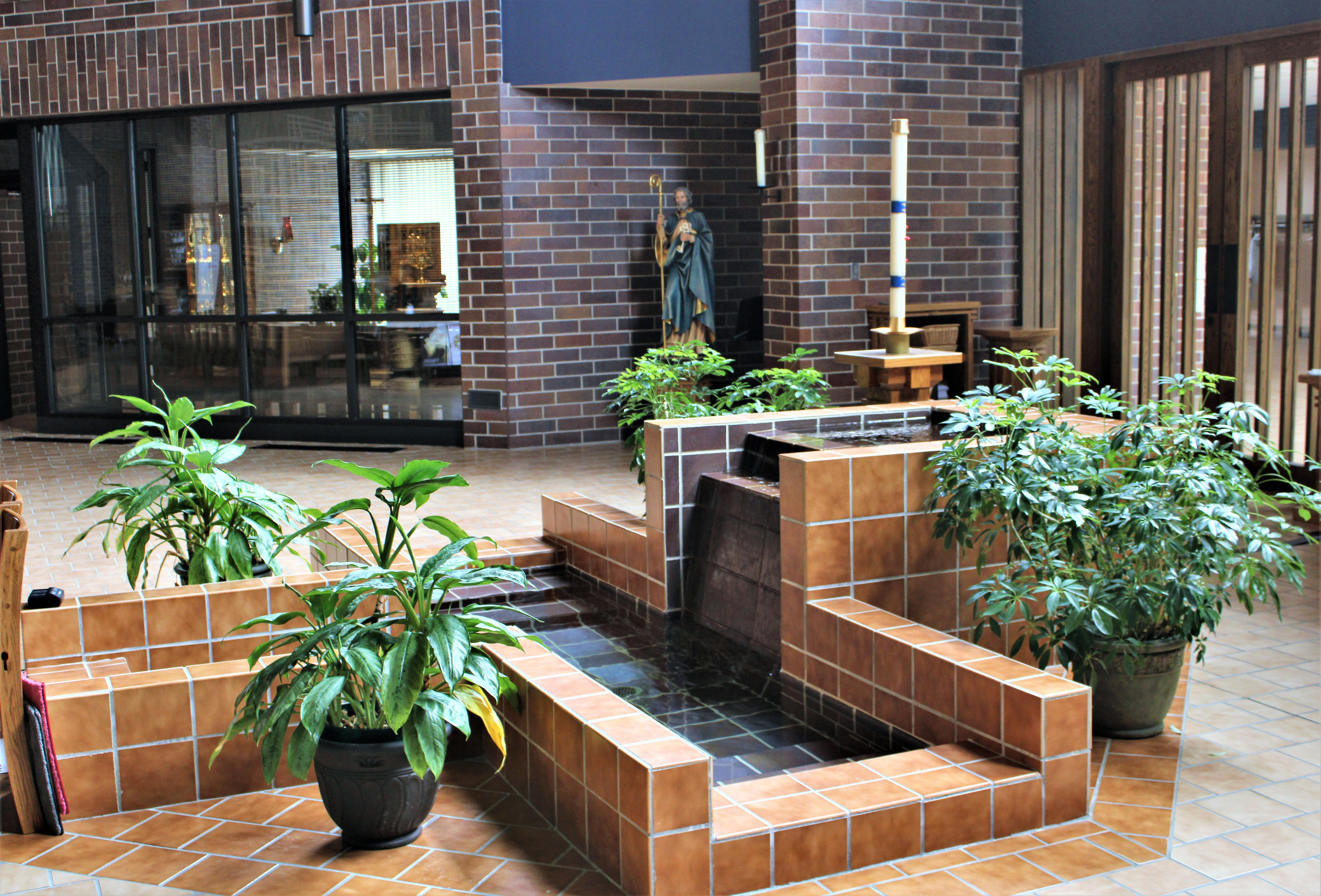
Baptismal font (2021)

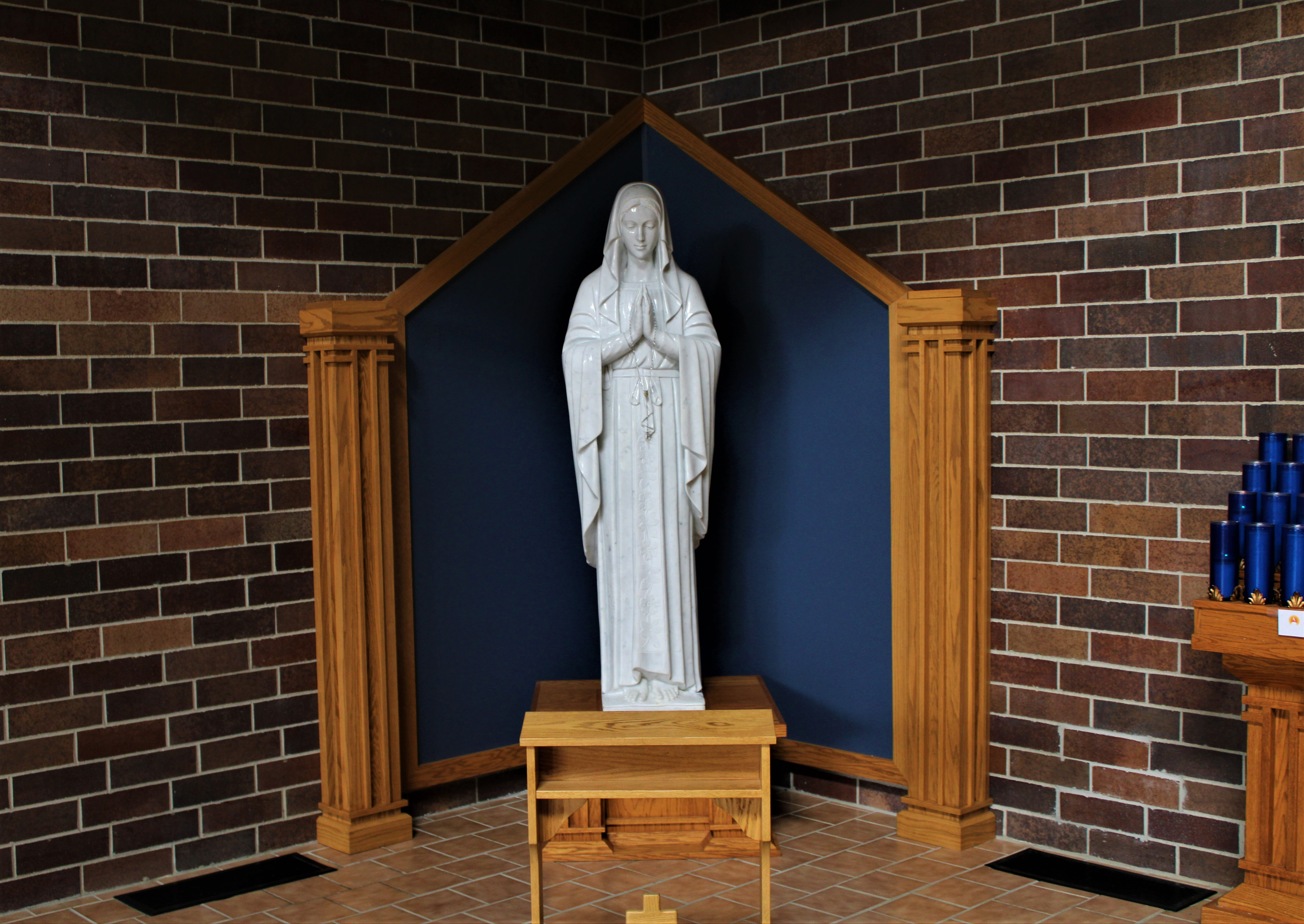
Shrine of the Blessed Virgin (2021)

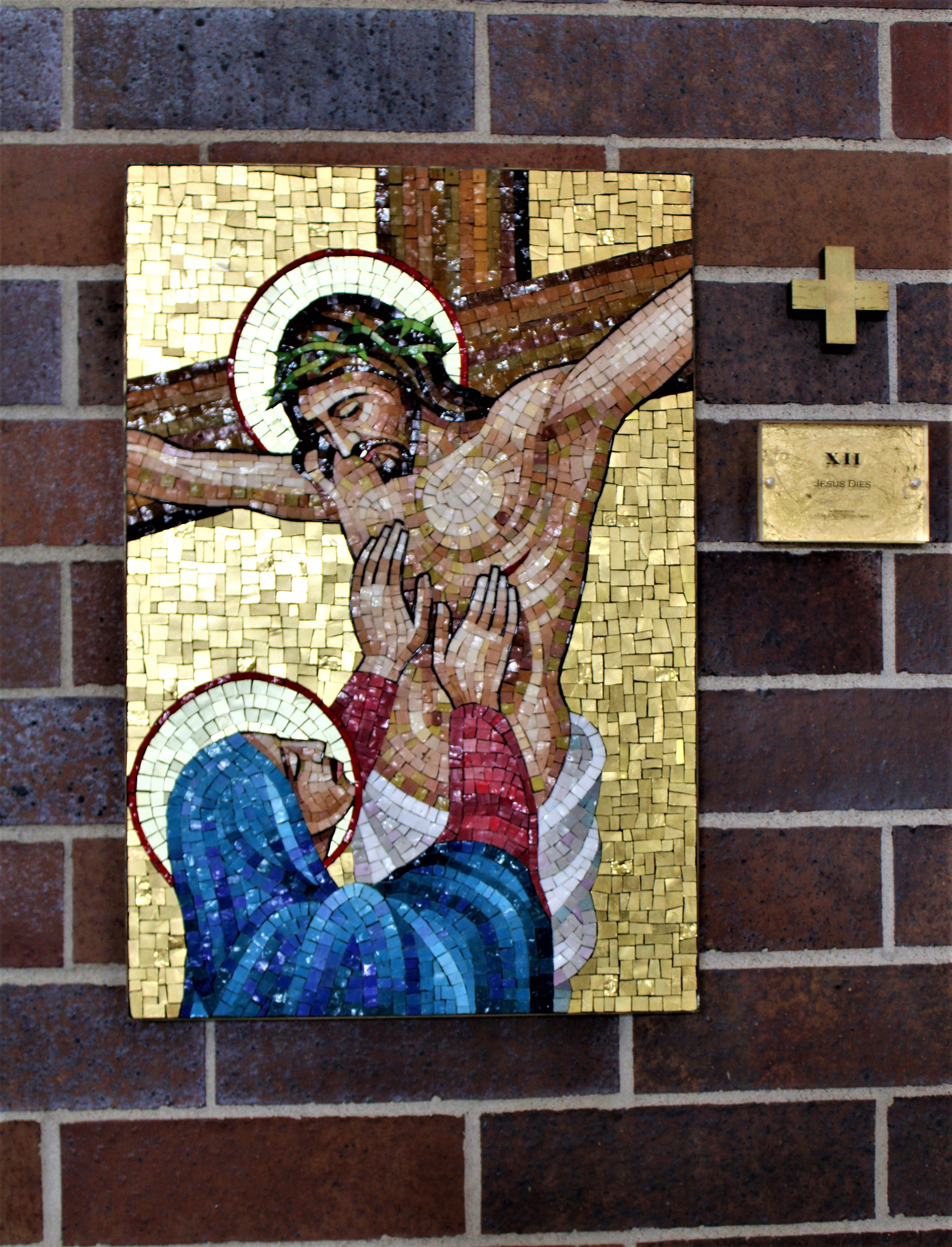
Station of the cross (2021)

== See also ==
- List of Catholic cathedrals in the United States
- List of cathedrals in the United States
