= Michael Joseph Hoeppner =

His Excellency The Most Reverend Michael Joseph Hoeppner
- Bishop emeritus of Crookston
- Church: Catholic Church
- Diocese: Crookston
- Appointed: September 28, 2007
- Installed: November 30, 2007
- Retired: April 13, 2021
- Predecessor: Victor Hermann Balke
- Successor: Andrew Cozzens

Orders
- Ordination: June 29, 1975 by Pope Paul VI
- Consecration: November 30, 2007 by Harry Joseph Flynn, Victor Hermann Balke, and Bernard Joseph Harrington

Personal details
- Born: June 1, 1949 (age 77) Winona, Minnesota
- Education: Pontifical North American College; Saint Paul University
- Motto: Omnia in nomine domini Iesu (All in the name of the Lord Jesus)

Styles of Michael Joseph Hoeppner
- Reference style: His Excellency; The Most Reverend
- Spoken style: Your Excellency
- Religious style: Bishop

Michael Joseph Hoeppner (born June 1, 1949) is an American prelate of the Catholic Church who served as the bishop of the Diocese of Crookston in Minnesota from November 30, 2007, to April 13, 2021.

After a Vatican investigation concluded that Hoeppner mishandled an allegation of sexual abuse by a priest, Pope Francis requested and received Hoeppner's resignation as bishop.

== Biography ==
=== Early life ===
Michael Hoeppner was born on June 1, 1949, in Winona, Minnesota. He undertook his theological studies at the Pontifical North American College in Rome. Hoeppner was ordained to the priesthood for the Diocese of Winona on June 29, 1975, by Pope Paul VI at St. Peter's Basilica in Rome.

Hoeppner received a Licentiate of Canon Law from Saint Paul University in Ottawa, Ontario. In addition to assignments within the Catholic school system in Winona, Hoeppner served as diocesan director of vocations. He served as Winona's judicial vicar from 1988 to 1997 and was later appointed vicar general by Bishop John Vlazny.

Following Vlazny's appointment as archbishop of Portland in Oregon, Hoeppner was elected as diocesan administrator to oversee the diocese until the installation of Bishop Bernard Harrington. Harrington then appointed Hoeppner as his vicar general.

=== Bishop of Crookston ===
Hoeppner was appointed bishop of Crookston by Pope Benedict XVI on September 28, 2007. Hoeppner was consecrated at the Cathedral of the Immaculate Conception in Crookston by Archbishop Harry Flynn on November 30, 2007.

In May 2017, Hoeppner became the first American bishop to be sued personally for coercion. The lawsuit was filed by Ronald Vasek, a former diaconate candidate in the diocese. Vasek alleged that Monsignor Roger Grundhaus sexually abused him when he was a teenager during a trip to Ohio in 1971. Vasek reported his allegations to the diocese in 2011.

In October 2015, Vasek signed a letter recanting his accusations against Grundhaus. Vasek said that Hoeppner threatened retaliation against Vasek's son, a priest in the diocese, if he failed to sign it. Vasek said that Hoeppner's actions were like "being abused all over again." On September 20, 2017, Vasek, the diocese and Hoeppner reached a legal settlement. As part of the agreement, Hoeppner released the letter from October 2015.

In September 2019, the Archdiocese of St. Paul and Minneapolis announced it would investigate Hoeppner's actions in the Vasek case. This was the first investigation in the United States of a bishop for failure to follow the procedures for sexual abuse allegations that Pope Francis promulgated in the 2019 document Vos estis lux mundi.

=== Retirement ===
Following the archdiocese investigation, Francis requested Hoeppner's resignation as bishop of Crookston. It was accepted by the pope on April 13, 2021. In his final mass in Crookston, Hoeppner apologized "...to you and everyone, as I've apologized to the Holy Father, for any failures of mine in governing as bishop." In March 2022, Bishop Andrew Cozzens, the new bishop of Crookston, announced that he would not allow Hoeppner to return to the diocese.

== See also ==
- Catholic Church hierarchy
- Catholic Church in the United States
- Historical list of the Catholic bishops of the United States
- List of Catholic bishops of the United States
- Lists of patriarchs, archbishops, and bishops

Catholic Church titles
Preceded by Victor Hermann Balke	Bishop of Crookston; November 30, 2007–April 13, 2021	Succeeded by Andrew H. Cozzens
