= 10th National Eucharistic Congress (United States) =

2024 Catholic event in Indiana, US

Tenth National Eucharistic Congress

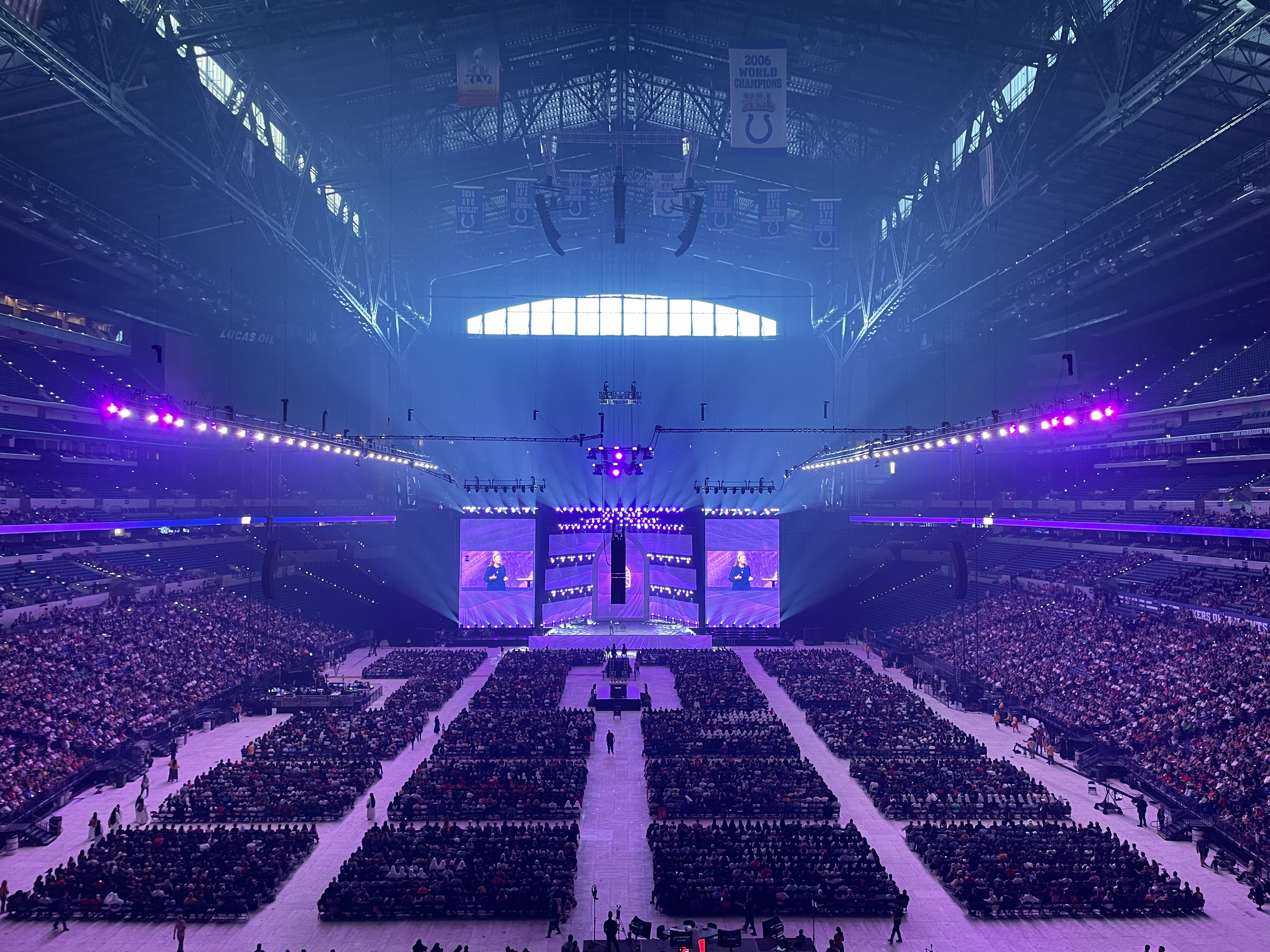
- The main stage of the congress at Lucas Oil Stadium
- Date: July 17–21, 2024
- Duration: 5 days
- Venue: Lucas Oil Stadium; Indiana Convention Center
- Location: Indianapolis; 39°45′36.2″N 86°9′49.7″W
- Type: Eucharistic congress
- Theme: Revival Happens Here
- Budget: $14 million
- Organized by: Bishop Andrew Cozzens (chairman); Archbishop Charles Thompson (host); Tim Glemkowski (CEO)
- Participants: 55,000 (expected)
- Papal delegate: Luis Cardinal Tagle
- Website: eucharisticcongress.org eucharisticpilgrimage.org

The Tenth National Eucharistic Congress was held from July 17 to 21, 2024, at Lucas Oil Stadium and the Indiana Convention Center in Indianapolis, Indiana, to foster devotion to the sacrament of the Eucharist. It was organized by the United States Conference of Catholic Bishops (USCCB). While there had been nine previous national Eucharistic congresses in the United States between 1895 and 1941, the outbreak of World War II halted further congresses and after the war the committee in charge of holding them fell dormant. In 2019 and 2020, spurred by a survey that reported low levels of belief in the dogma of the Real Presence among U.S. Catholics, as well as President Joe Biden's reception of communion as a Catholic despite publicly disagreeing with certain Catholic tenets, the Bishops initiated a "Eucharistic Revival" movement which culminated in four nationwide Eucharistic processions and the Eucharistic Congress in Indianapolis – the first national congress in 83 years, bringing together an estimated 50,000 Catholics for talks, programs, and liturgies.

== Background ==
=== Prior Congress history ===
From 1895 to 1941, there were nine national eucharistic congresses held in the United States. The last national congress to occur prior to the 2024 congress was the Ninth National Eucharistic Congress in Saint Paul, Minnesota, in 1941. While there had been national congresses about every five years prior to the ninth congress, the outbreak of World War II halted the gatherings. Bishop Joseph Schrembs, promoter of national Eucharistic congresses, died shortly after the close of the war. Archbishop Richard Cushing succeeded Schrembs in the role and established a committee for national Eucharistic congresses in 1946, but despite the establishment of that committee, no national congresses were held. The 28th International Eucharistic Congress was held in Chicago in 1926, and the 41st International Eucharistic Congress took place in Philadelphia in 1976.

=== Real Presence controversy ===
In 2019, a controversial Pew Research Center study stated that belief among U.S. Catholics in the dogma of the Real Presence (Transubstantiation) was as low as 33%, alarming many of the nation's bishops. Bishop Robert Barron, then an auxiliary of the Archdiocese of Los Angeles, raised the issue at a meeting of the United States Conference of Catholic Bishops (USCCB) doctrine committee. An advisory committee was later formed to brainstorm a response.

=== Eucharistic coherence debate ===
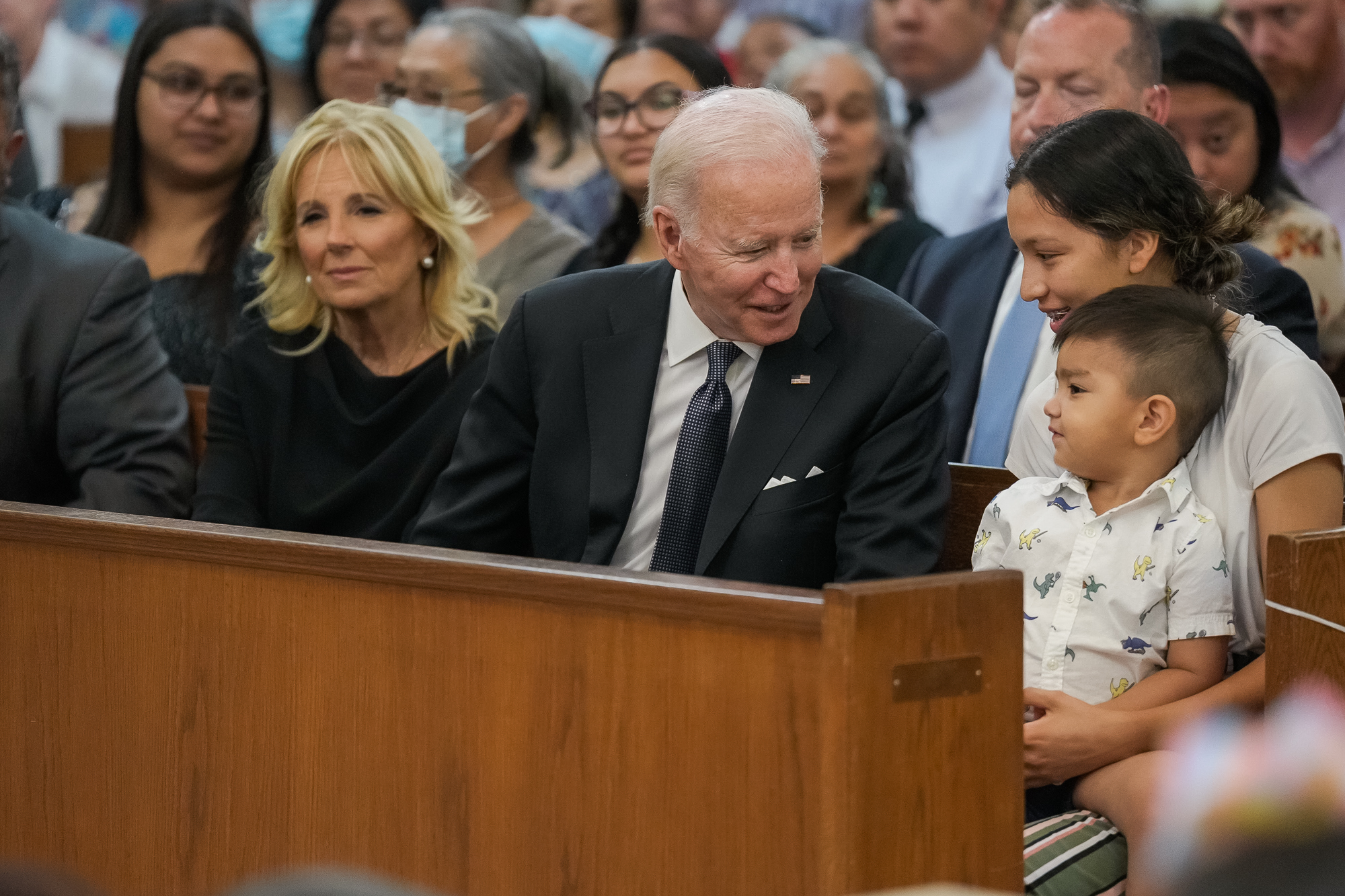
President Joe Biden attending Mass in 2022

Upon the election of President Joe Biden in 2020, members of the USCCB began to discuss the appropriateness of Biden receiving Communion. The Catholic Church teaches that those in mortal sin are not to approach the sacrament prior to sacramental confession, and the Code of Canon Law canon 915 states that those in a state of "manifest grave sin" are not to be admitted to Communion. Joe Biden's public support for abortion was interpreted by many to put him in a state of grave sin and thus made him ineligible for reception of Communion.

In April 2021, it was reported that US bishops were considering asking Biden to stop receiving Communion. Archbishop José Gómez, president of the United States Conference of Catholic Bishops, informed the Congregation for the Doctrine of the Faith that the bishops were planning on submitting a draft of a document "to address the situation of Catholics in public office who support legislation allowing abortion, euthanasia or other moral evils". A May 7 response from Luis Ladaria Ferrer, prefect of the Congregation for the Doctrine of the Faith, urged bishops to take an "extensive and serene" look at the topic. A group of bishops led by Cardinals Blase J. Cupich and Wilton Daniel Gregory pushed for the tabling of the conversation altogether. As a result of this pushback, by the second half of 2021 the focus had shifted from the denial of communion to Joe Biden to an overall call to "enter more deeply by faith and love into this great Mystery of Mysteries". The bishops released a heavily modified Eucharistic teaching document in 2021.

=== Eucharistic Revival ===
With the overall movement of the bishops leaning towards increasing devotion to the Eucharist among the Catholic faithful, the USCCB officially launched the National Eucharistic Revival on the Feast of Corpus Christi in 2022. The three-year program, led by Bishop Andrew Cozzens of Crookston, Minnesota, was launched to "inspire, educate, and unite the faithful in a more intimate relationship with Jesus in the Eucharist", culminating in the Congress in Indianapolis in 2024.

The first year of the program focused on diocesan-level initiatives, and the second year focused on parish-level initiatives, with four national Eucharistic processions and the congress to take place at the end of the second year. The third year, following the congress, was devoted to the Church "going out on mission".

== National Eucharistic Pilgrimage ==
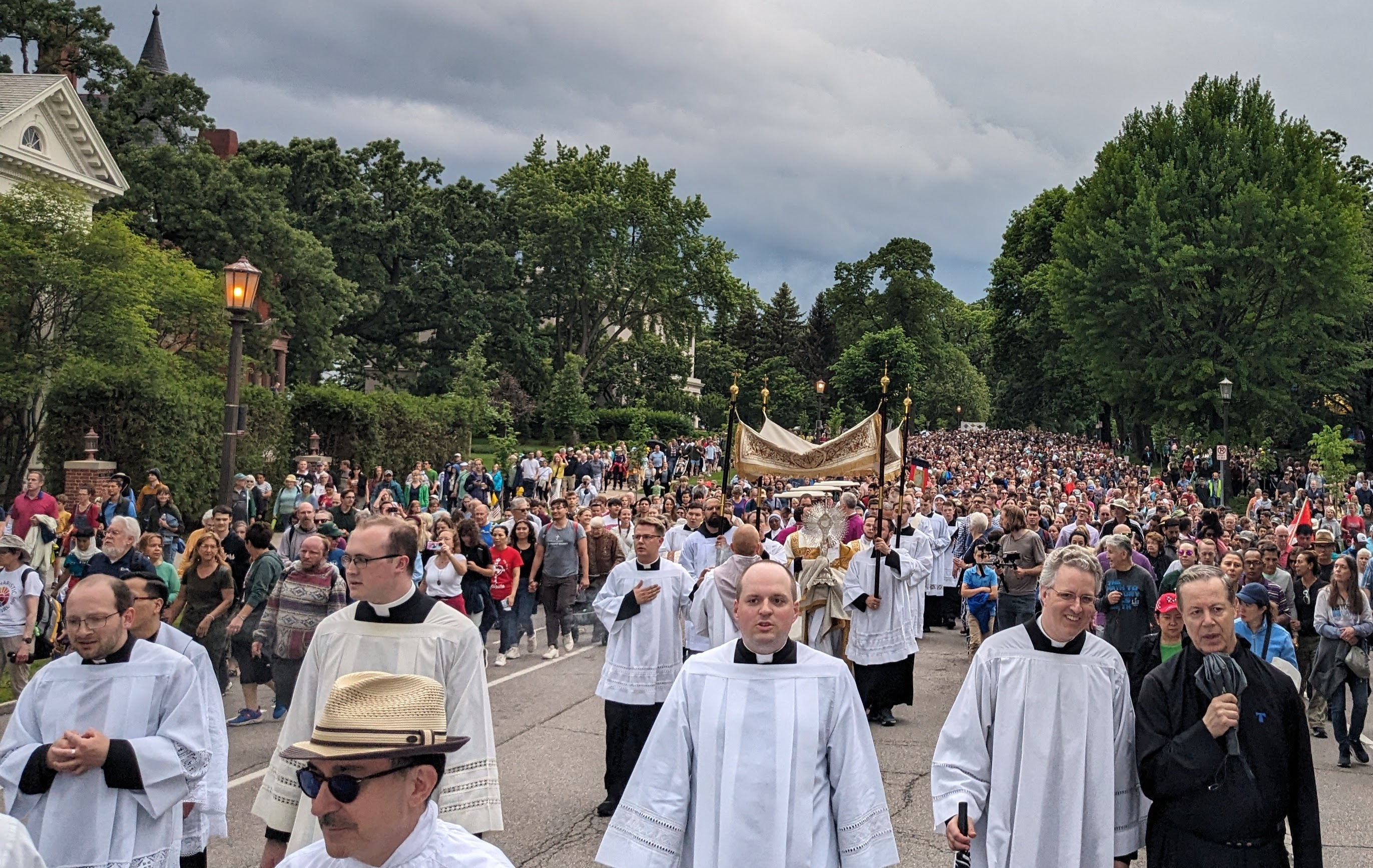
A photo of the "Source and Summit" Eucharistic Procession in Saint Paul, Minnesota

As part of the lead-up to the congress, there were four Eucharistic pilgrimages from the four cardinal directions of the United States that made their way to Indianapolis in time for the congress. The Marian Route started at the Mississippi Headwaters in Bemidji, Minnesota, and travelled through Saint Paul, Milwaukee, and Chicago; the St. Elizabeth Ann Seton Route started at St. Mary's Church in New Haven, Connecticut, and travelled through New York City, Washington D.C., Pittsburgh, and Cincinnati, accompanied by its full-time chaplain Fr. Roger J. Landry, the only chaplain to walk the entirety of one of the routes; the St. Juan Diego Route started in Brownsville, Texas, and travelled through Houston, New Orleans, Atlanta, and Louisville; the St. Junipero Serra Route started in San Francisco and travelled through Reno, Denver, Des Moines, and St. Louis.

Pre-selected "perpetual pilgrims" traveled the entire distance with the Eucharist, stopping along the way for public Eucharistic processions in cities and acts of service. Notable processions along the way included a 7,000-person procession in Saint Paul and a 4,000-person procession in San Francisco.

== Congress ==
=== Preparation and reactions ===
There were initial criticisms of the proposed $28 million budget for the congress, including the ticket cost per participant, not including lodging, of $300. Some families were discouraged by the high price tag. As a result, single-day passes and scholarships were announced, and the budget was halved and brought down to $14 million.

In the time leading up to the congress, Pope Francis praised the efforts of the organizers and called it "a significant moment in the life of the Church in the United States". He appointed Luis Cardinal Tagle as the papal envoy to the congress.

In the wake of the attempted assassination of Donald Trump, which took place the week prior to the congress, organizers stated that they had numerous protocols in place and were not worried about security threats at the event.

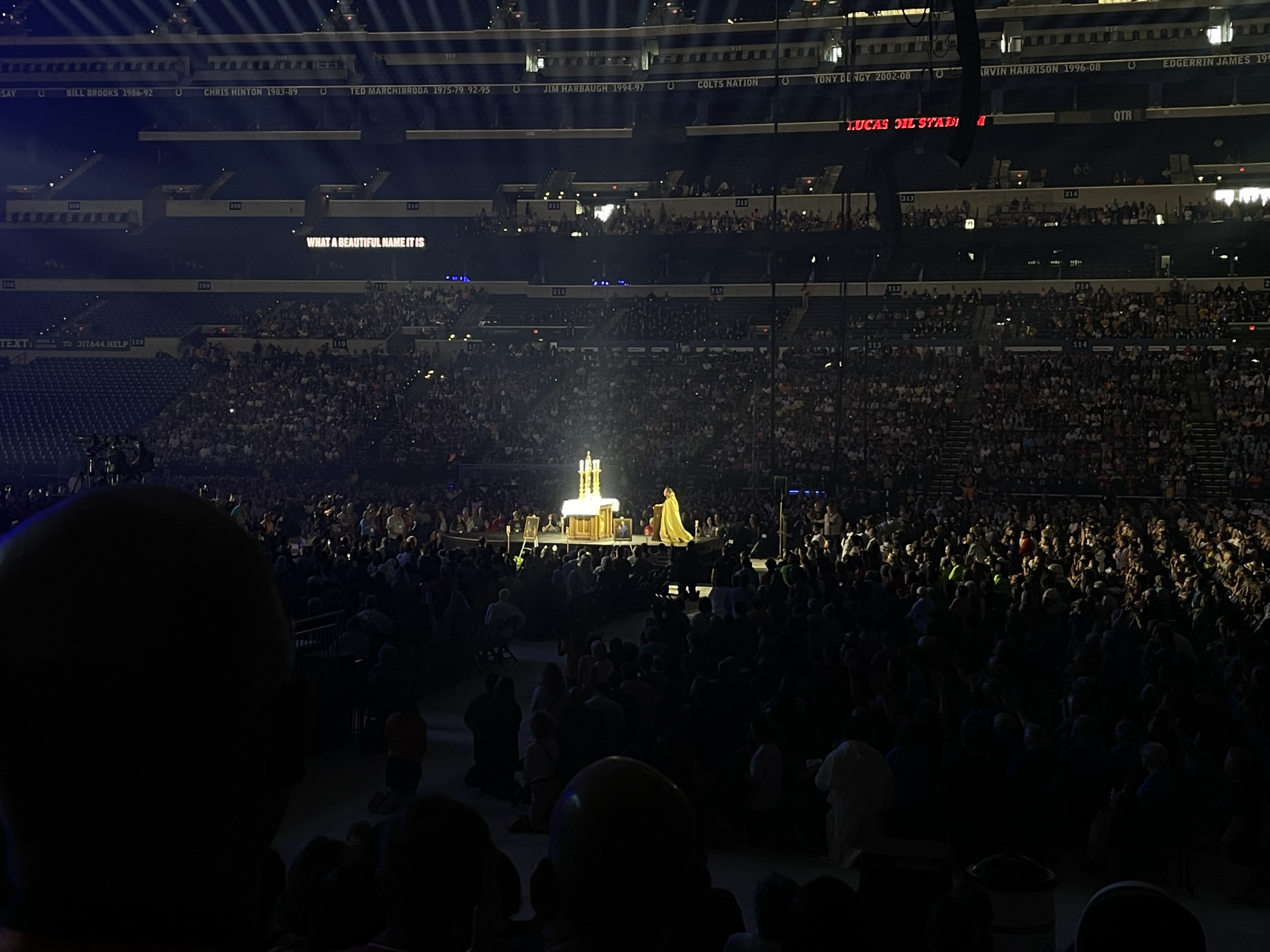
Eucharistic adoration in Lucas Oil Stadium on the opening night of the congress

=== July 17 ===
The congress opened with adoration and benediction led by Bishop Andrew Cozzens in Lucas Oil Stadium. Prior to the opening event, the check-in line at times stretched for three-quarters of a mile. Christophe Cardinal Pierre, apostolic nuncio to the United States, addressed the audience afterwards.

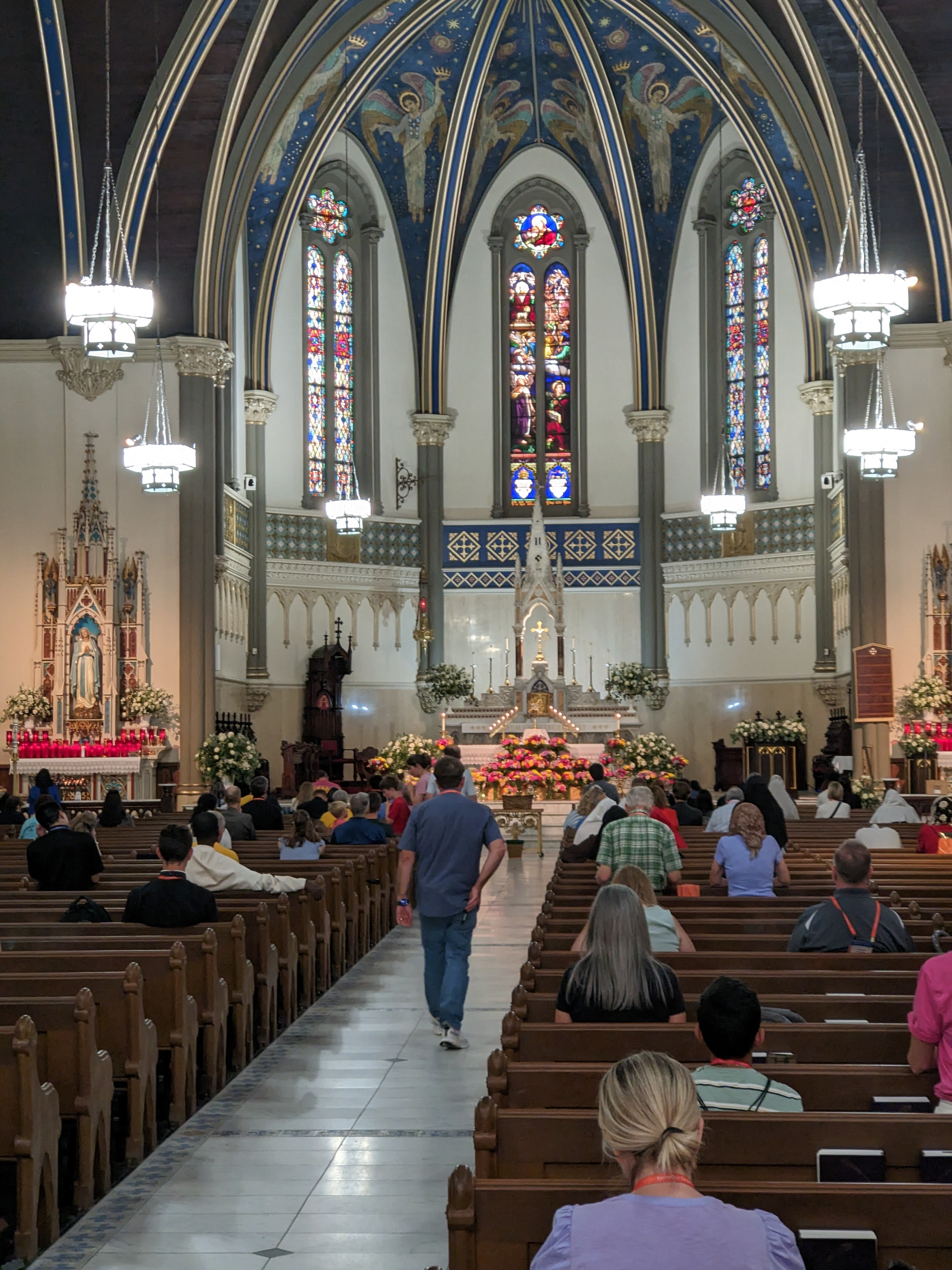
Eucharistic adoration at St. John the Evangelist Church in Indianapolis

A perpetual adoration chapel for the event was located at St. John the Evangelist Catholic Church, across the street from the convention center, from 9am on July 17 until 9am on the July 21.

=== July 18 ===
The second day included youth, Spanish, and Extraordinary Form Masses as well as a Byzantine Divine Liturgy celebrated by Bohdan Danylo. At the main opening Mass, Timothy Cardinal Dolan preached on the need for the sacrifice of the Mass to be central to the lives of Christians. There were dozens of breakout sessions in the morning and afternoon, including a message given by Monsignor James Shea. A performance of Bernadette de Lourdes, the Musical was given in the evening. Luis Cardinal Tagle, papal envoy to the congress, celebrated a special Mass for Filipino Catholics at SS. Peter & Paul Cathedral.

The evening keynote speakers were Fr. Mike Schmitz and Mother Olga of the Sacred Heart. Schmitz's keynote entitled "The Greatest Love Story," delivered to 50,000 people, emphasized the need for repentance in order to have revival. He went on to talk about how the Eucharist is more important than merely the Real Presence, but culminates in the sacrificial nature of the Mass. Mother Olga's keynote talked about the healing power of the Eucharist. After testimonies by Lila Rose and the parents of Michelle Duppong, the evening ended with adoration led by Bishop William Byrne of the Diocese of Springfield in Massachusetts.

=== July 19 ===
Masses in English, Vietnamese, Latin, and Spanish were celebrated; Bishop Robert Mark Pipta, Eparch of Parma, celebrated a Byzantine Hierarchical Vigil Divine Liturgy in the afternoon at St. Athanasius Byzantine Church.

Morning session speakers included Tony Meléndez, Mary Healy, Patrick Madrid, and bishops Gustavo García-Siller, Joseph A. Espaillat, and Andrew Cozzens. Afternoon breakout session topics included Priestly Eucharistic Identity by Bishop Robert Barron, gender dysphoria, and women.

Evening keynotes were given by Sr. Josephine Garrett, CSFN and Fr. Boniface Hicks, OSB of St. Vincent Archabbey. Fr. Boniface's presentation concerned healing from brokenness, and Sr. Josephine Garrett spoke about the important of repentance in the process of healing. Prior to the keynotes, Costa Rican former professional tennis player Paula Umaña spoke of the healing she attributes to prayers and the Blessed Virgin Mary.

On both July 18 and 19, there were opportunities from noon to 6:30 pm to pack a goal of 360,000 meals for those in need.

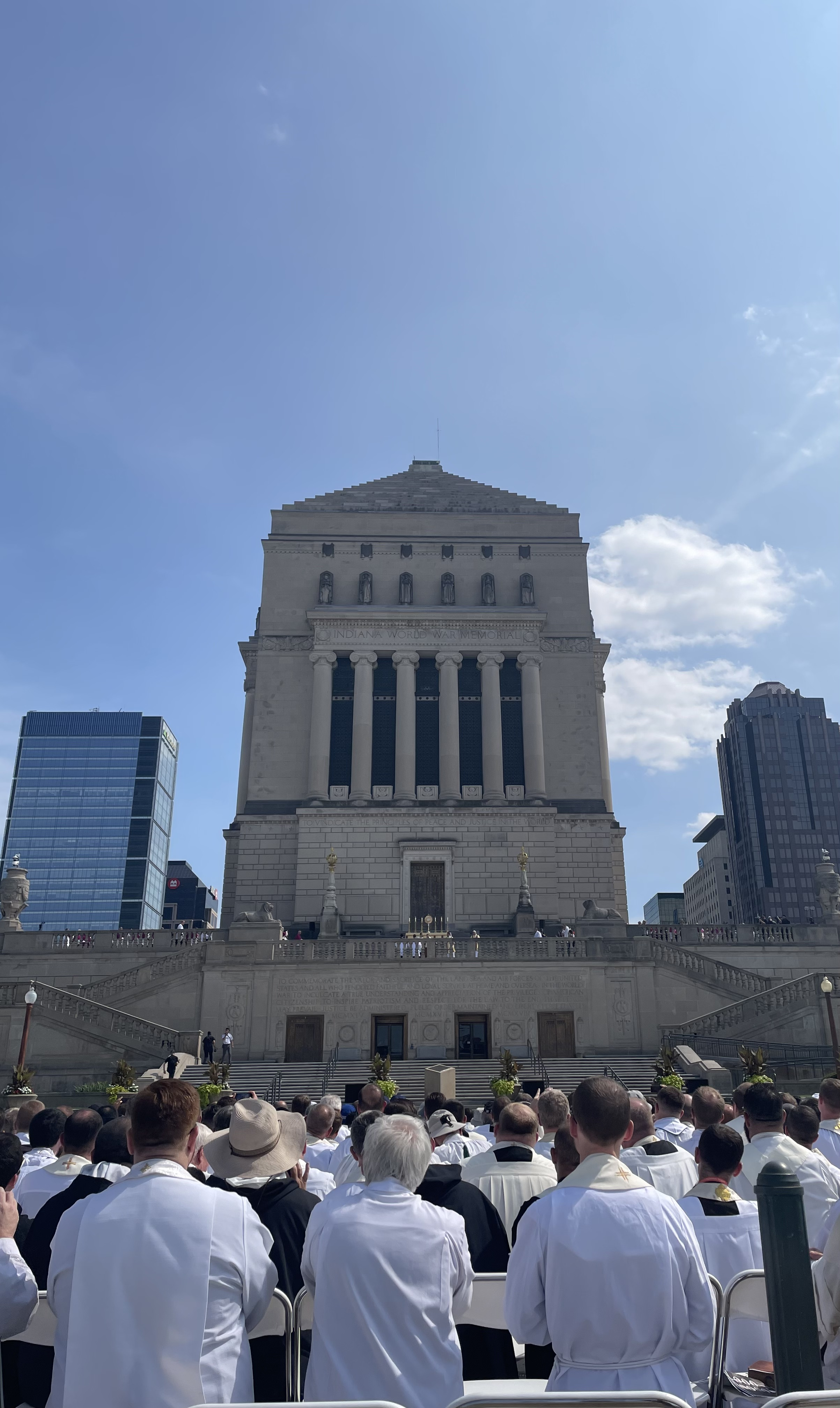
Adoration of the Eucharist at the Indiana World War Memorial

=== July 20 ===
On July 20, the main liturgy held at Lucas Oil Stadium was a Syro-Malabar Holy Qurbana celebrated by Bishop Joy Alappatt and Archbishop Borys Gudziak. In the late afternoon, a Eucharistic procession travelled through downtown Indianapolis from the Lucas Oil Stadium to the Indiana World War Memorial, with the final benediction offered by Bishop Andrew Cozzens. Around 900 priests, 500 deacons, 550 seminarians, and 900 religious sisters walked in the procession, with around 40,000 to 50,000 laity lining the streets.

Keynote speakers for the evening were Bishop Robert Barron, Gloria Purvis, Tim Glemkowski, and Jonathan Roumie. The evening closed with adoration with worship music led by Matt Maher.

=== July 21 ===
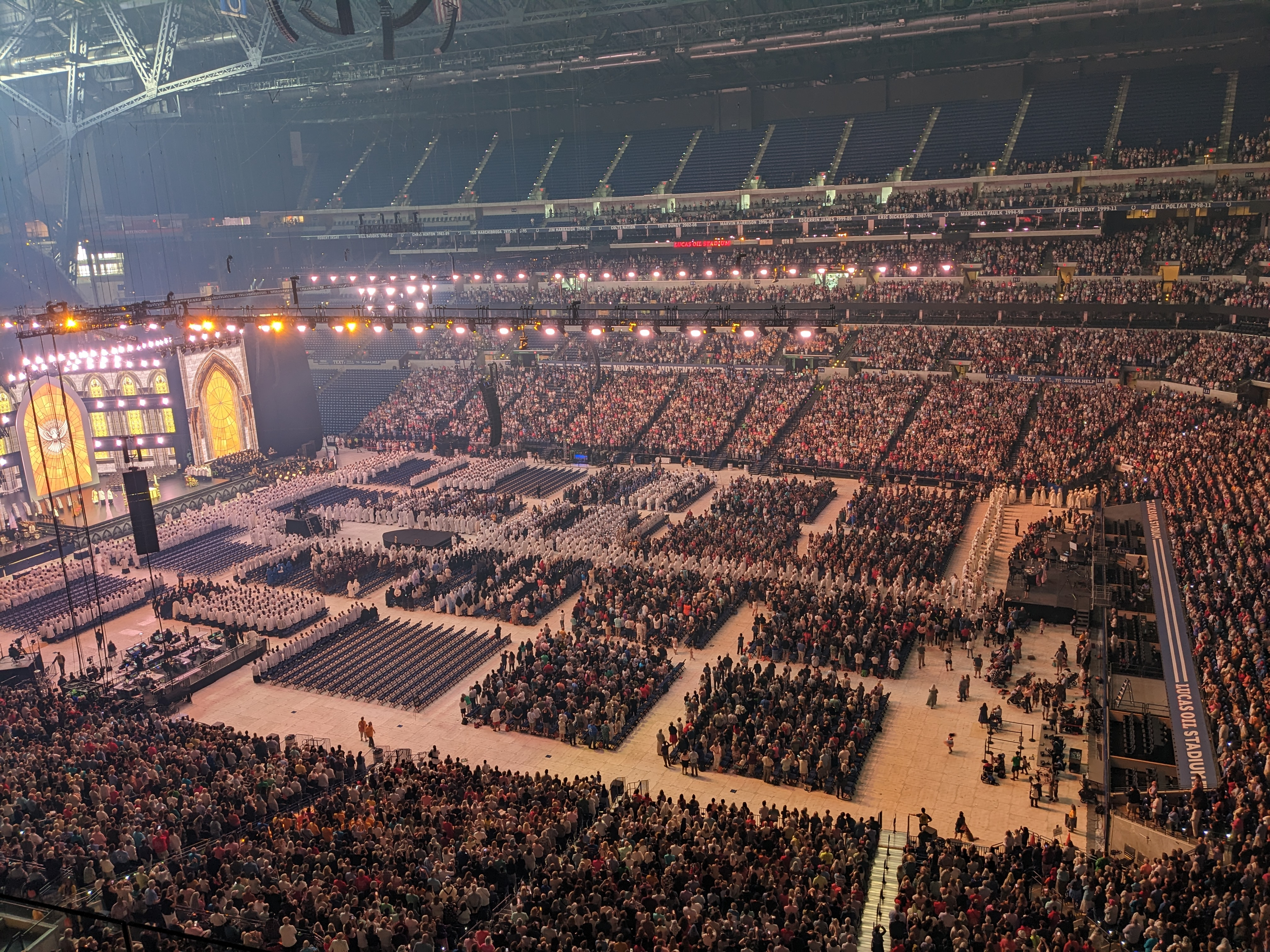
Closing Mass of the congress at Lucas Oil Stadium

Cardinal Luis Tagle, the papal delegate for the congress, celebrated the closing Mass at Lucas Oil Stadium. He preached on the need for missionary zeal, and expressed the wishes of the Holy Father that the congress would bear much fruit in the Church and society the United States. With over 1,600 seminarians, priests, bishops, and cardinals, the opening procession for the Mass lasted 25 minutes. Approximately 50,000 people were in attendance.

== Post-Congress ==
Bishop Andrew Cozzens announced at the end of the 2024 Congress that there were preliminary plans for the next congress to be held in 2033, 2,000 years after Jesus' crucifixion, although the option for an earlier date was left open. In February 2025, at a meeting of Catholic business executives associated with Legatus, a 2029 Congress was announced by Jason Shanks, the president of the NEC.

Plans were also announced for a eucharistic pilgrimage to begin in Indianapolis in the spring of 2025, with its conclusion in Los Angeles on the Solemnity of the Most Holy Body and Blood of Christ on June 22, 2025.

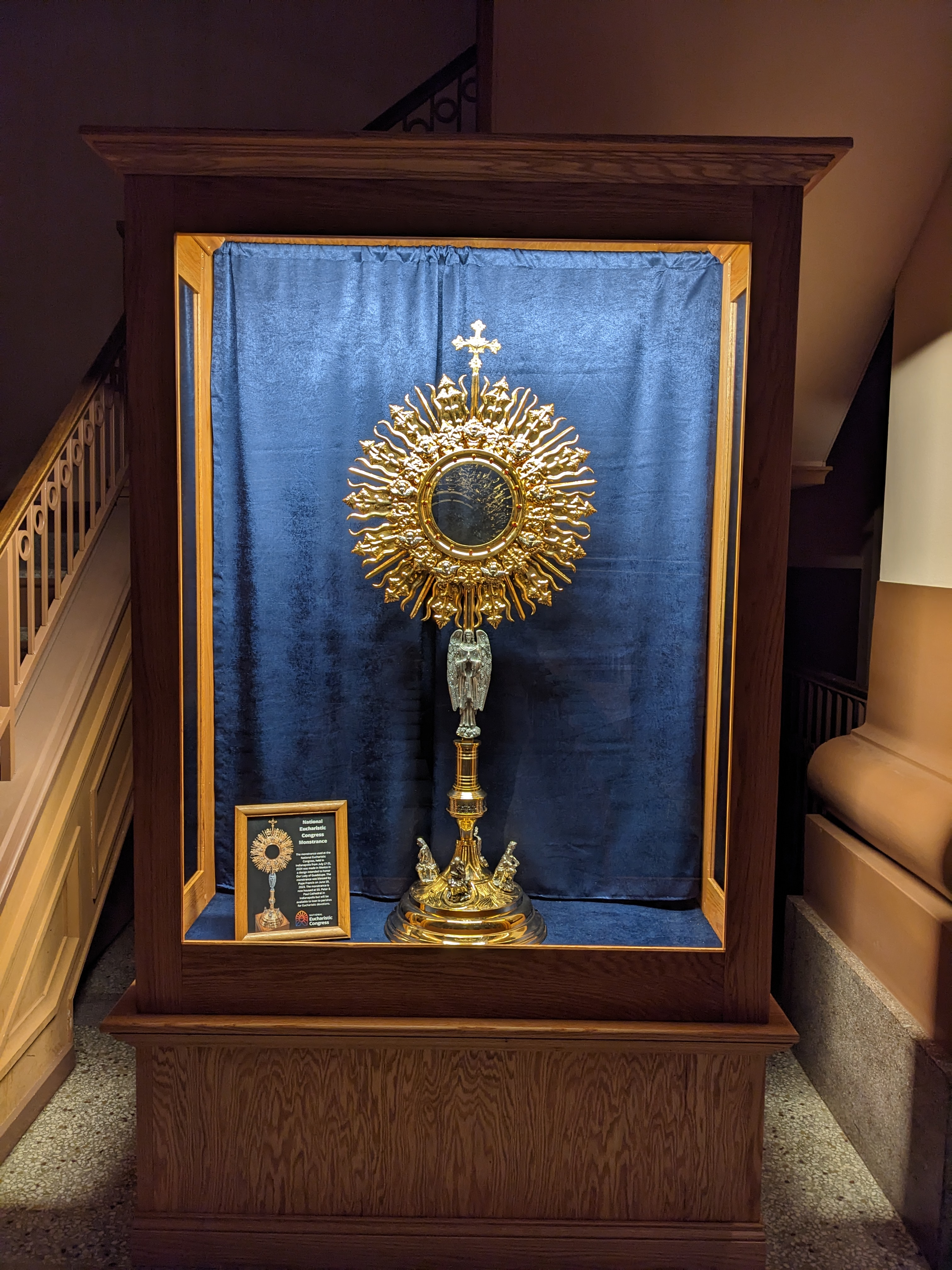
Display case housing the monstrance used at the 10th National Eucharistic Congress at Saints Peter & Paul Cathedral in Indianapolis

A few larger items from the National Eucharistic Congress remained in the Archdiocese of Indianapolis after the conclusion of the congress. The monstrance used for the eucharistic procession on July 20 is located at Saints Peter & Paul Cathedral in Indianapolis. The organ used for the Congress liturgies in Lucas Oil Stadium is now located at St. Mary Catholic Church in North Vernon, Indiana.

Two sculptures created by Timothy Paul Schmalz for the congress also remain in Indianapolis. The large crucifix statue titled This is My Body is located on the campus of Marian University. Another sculpture titled Be Welcoming is located outside St. John the Evangelist Church in Indianapolis. The National Eucharistic Congress was one of the largest gatherings held in Indianapolis to date, with hotel occupancy during the congress at the highest rate in the city's history.
