= Meppen, Illinois =

- Unincorporated community
- Location within Illinois Location within the United States
- Coordinates: 38°59′49″N 90°36′17″W
- Country: United States
- State: Illinois
- County: Calhoun
- Elevation: 456 ft (139 m)
- Time zone: UTC-6 (Central (CST))
  - Summer (DST): UTC-5 (CDT)
- Area code: 618
- GNIS feature ID: 413413

Meppen is an unincorporated community in Calhoun County, Illinois, United States. Meppen is north of Brussels. St. Joseph's Cemetery is located in Meppen.

== History ==
The community was named after the city of Meppen in the Northwest of Germany.

== Notable person ==
- Roman Catholic Bishop Victor Hermann Balke was born in Meppen.
