= Lawrence Alexander Glenn =

American prelate

His Eminence, The Most Reverend Lawrence Alexander Glenn
- Bishop of Crookston
- Church: Roman Catholic Church
- See: Diocese of Crookston
- Predecessor: Francis Joseph Schenk
- Successor: Kenneth Joseph Povish
- Other posts: Auxiliary Bishop of Duluth; 1956 to 1960

Orders
- Ordination: June 11, 1927 by Austin Dowling
- Consecration: September 12, 1956 by Amleto Giovanni Cicognani

Personal details
- Born: August 25, 1900 Bellingham, Washington, US
- Died: January 26, 1985 (aged 84) Vatican City
- Motto: In veritate et caritate (In truth and charity)

Laurence Alexander Glenn (August 25, 1900 – January 26, 1985) was an American prelate of the Catholic Church. He served as an auxiliary bishop of the Diocese of Duluth in Minnesota between 1956 and 1960 and bishop of the Diocese of Crookston, in Minnesota from 1960 to 1970.

== Biography ==
=== Early life ===
Lawrence Glenn was born in Bellingham, Washington, on August 25, 1900. He was ordained a priest in St. Paul, Minnesota, for the Archdiocese of Saint Paul by Archbishop Austin Dowling on June 11, 1927.

=== Auxiliary Bishop of Duluth ===
On July 13, 1956, Glen was appointed auxiliary bishop of Duluth by Pope Pius XII. On September 12, 1956, Glenn received his episcopal consecration at the College of St. Scholastica in Duluth, Minnesota, by Cardinal Amleto Giovanni Cicognani.

=== Bishop of Crookston ===
On June 27, 1960, Glenn was appointed as the fourth bishop of Crookston by Pope John XXIII. On July 24, 1970, Pope Paul VI accepted Glenn's resignation as bishop of Crookston. Lawrence Glenn died in Vatican City on January 26, 1985, at age 84.

Catholic Church titles
| Preceded by Francis Joseph Schenk | Bishop of Crookston; 1960–1970 | Succeeded by Kenneth Joseph Povish |
