= John Hubert Peschges =

His Eminence, The Most Reverend John Hubert Peschges
- Bishop of Crookston
- Church: Catholic Church
- See: Diocese of Crookston

Orders
- Ordination: April 15, 1905 by Joseph Bernard Cotter
- Consecration: November 9, 1938 by Francis Martin Kelly

Personal details
- Born: May 11, 1881 West Newton, Minnesota, US
- Died: October 30, 1944 (aged 63) Crookston, Minnesota, US

John Hubert Peschges (May 11, 1881 – October 30, 1944) was a prelate of the Catholic Church. He served as the second bishop of the Diocese of Crookston in Minnesota from 1938 until his death in 1944.

== Biography ==
John Peschges was born in West Newton, Minnesota on May 11, 1881. He was ordained a priest by Bishop Joseph Cotter for the Diocese of Winona on April 15, 1905.

On August 30, 1938, Pope Pius XI appointed Peschges bishop of the Crookston Diocese; he was consecrated by Bishop Francis Kelly on November 9, 1938. Peschges established the Confraternity of Christian Doctrine, religious courses for rural youth, and organizations for agricultural development.

John Peschges died in Crookston on October 30, 1944.

Catholic Church titles
Preceded by Timothy J. Corbett	Bishop of Crookston; 1938–1944	Succeeded by Francis Joseph Schenk
