= Francis Joseph Schenk =

American prelate

His Eminence, The Most Reverend Francis Joseph Schenk
- Bishop of Duluth
- Church: Catholic Church
- See: Diocese of Duluth
- Predecessor: John Hubert Peschges
- Successor: Lawrence Alexander Glenn
- Other post: Bishop of Crookston

Orders
- Ordination: June 13, 1926 by Austin Dowling
- Consecration: May 24, 1945 by John Gregory Murray

Personal details
- Born: April 1, 1901 Superior, Wisconsin, US
- Died: October 28, 1969 (aged 68) Duluth, Minnesota, US
- Education: College of St. Thomas; St. Paul Seminary; Catholic University of America
- Motto: Humilitas et caritas (Humility and charity)

Styles of Francis Joseph Schenk
- Reference style: The Most Reverend
- Spoken style: Your Excellency
- Religious style: Monsignor
- Posthumous style: none

Francis Joseph Schenk (April 1, 1901 – October 28, 1969) was an American prelate of the Catholic Church. He served as bishop of the Diocese of Crookston in Minnesota (1945–1960) and bishop of the Diocese of Duluth in Minnesota (1960–1969).

== Biography ==
=== Early life ===
Francis Schenk was born on April 1, 1901, in Superior, Wisconsin, to Nicholas and Frances Mary (née Fischer) Schenk. He attended St. Thomas Academy then in St. Paul, Minnesota, from 1915 to 1918, and earned a Bachelor of Arts degree from the College of St. Thomas in St. Paul in 1922. He then studied for the priesthood at St. Paul Seminary, receiving a Bachelor of Sacred Theology degree in 1926.

=== Priesthood ===
Schenk was ordained a priest in St. Paul by Archbishop Austin Dowling for the Archdiocese of St. Paul on June 13, 1926. He continued his studies at the Catholic University of America in Washington, D.C., where he earned a doctorate in canon law in 1928. Following his return to Minnesota, he served as secretary to Archbishop Austin Dowling from 1928 to 1930. Schenk then served as vice-chancellor of the archdiocese (1930–1934) and as a professor at St. Paul Seminary (1934–1942). From 1942 to 1945, he served as vicar general of the archdiocese and rector of the Cathedral of St. Paul.

=== Bishop of Crookston ===
On March 10, 1945, Schenk was appointed the third bishop of the Diocese of Crookston by Pope Pius XII. He received his episcopal consecration on May 24, 1945, from Archbishop John Murray, with Bishops Thomas Welch and Aloisius Muench serving as co-consecrators. During his tenure in Crookston, Schenk established over 30 new churches, founded Our Northland Diocese newspaper, and organized diocesan offices of the Catholic Social Service Agency and the Catholic Youth Organization. He also founded summer boarding schools for the children of the thousands of Mexican migrant workers who worked in the diocese.

=== Bishop of Duluth ===
Following the death of Bishop Welch, Schenk was appointed the fourth bishop of Duluth by Pope John XXIII on January 27, 1960. Between 1962 and 1965, he attended all four sessions of the Second Vatican Council in Rome.

=== Retirement and legacy ===
On April 30, 1969, Pope Paul VI accepted Schenk's resignation as bishop of Duluth. Francis Schenk died in Duluth on October 28, 1969, at age 68.

== Notes ==
Catholic Church titles
Preceded by John Hubert Peschges	Bishop of Crookston; 1945–1960	Succeeded by Lawrence Alexander Glenn
Preceded by Thomas Anthony Welch	Bishop of Duluth; 1960–1969	Succeeded by Paul Francis Anderson
