= Victor Herman Balke =

Catholic bishop

His Excellency, The Most Reverend Victor Herman Balke
- Bishop Emeritus of Crookston
- Church: Roman Catholic Church
- Diocese: Crookston
- Appointed: July 7, 1976
- Installed: September 2, 1976
- Retired: September 28, 2007
- Predecessor: Kenneth Joseph Povish
- Successor: Michael Joseph Hoeppner

Orders
- Ordination: May 24, 1958 by William Aloysius O'Connor
- Consecration: September 2, 1976 by John Roach, Joseph Alphonse McNicholas, and William Aloysius O'Connor

Personal details
- Born: 29 September 1931 (age 94) Meppen, Illinois
- Motto: Bless the Lord my soul

Styles of Victor Herman Balke
- Reference style: His Excellency; The Most Reverend
- Spoken style: Your Excellency
- Religious style: Bishop

Victor Herman Balke (September 29, 1931) is a prelate of the Roman Catholic Church who served as bishop of the Diocese of Crookston in Minnesota from 1976 to 2007.

== Biography ==
=== Early life ===
Born on September 29, 1931, in Meppen, Illinois (in Calhoun County), Victor Balke's parents were Elizabeth Knese and Bernard Balke Sr. He attended St. Joseph Grade School in Meppen as well as the Monterey Grade School. Balke graduated from Hardin County High School in 1949 and entered seminary in September 1949.

=== Priesthood ===
Balke was ordained into the priesthood in Springfield, Illinois, on May 24, 1958, by Bishop William A. O’Connor for the Diocese of Springfield in Illinois.

Following his ordination, Balke served as assistant pastor at the Cathedral of the Immaculate Conception Parish in Springfield for four years and was chaplain at St. Joseph Home for the Aged in Springfield. Later, he was named procurator, and then rector of the diocesan Seminary of the Immaculate Conception in Springfield, Illinois. He served on the matrimonial tribunal as synodal judge and defender of the bond. He was also chair of the diocesan Commission on Ecumenism and secretary-treasurer of the priests’ council.

=== Bishop of Crookston ===
Balke was appointed as the sixth bishop of Crookston by Pope Paul VI on July 3, 1976. He was consecrated in Crookston by Archbishop John Roach on September 2, 1976.

After reaching his 75th birthday, the mandatory retirement age for bishops, Balke submitted his letter of resignation as bishop of Crookston to Pope Benedict XVI. The pope accepted Balke's resignation on September 28, 2007. Balke remained as apostolic administrator of the diocese until Reverend Michael Hoeppner was installed as its new bishop on November 30, 2007.

== See also ==
- Catholic Church hierarchy
- Catholic Church in the United States
- Historical list of the Catholic bishops of the United States
- List of Catholic bishops of the United States
- Lists of patriarchs, archbishops, and bishops

== Episcopal succession ==
Catholic Church titles
Preceded by Kenneth Joseph Povish	Bishop of Crookston; September 2, 1976 – September 28, 2007	Succeeded by Michael Joseph Hoeppner
