= West Newton Township, Nicollet County, Minnesota =

West Newton Township, Minnesota
- Township
- Location within the state of Minnesota West Newton Township, Minnesota (the United States)
- Coordinates: 44°25′22″N 94°33′20″W
- Country: United States
- State: Minnesota
- County: Nicollet

Area
  - Total: 38.2 sq mi (99.0 km^{2})
  - Land: 37.7 sq mi (97.6 km^{2})
  - Water: 0.54 sq mi (1.4 km^{2})
- Elevation: 1,007 ft (307 m)

Population (2000)
  - Total: 517
  - Density: 14/sq mi (5.3/km^{2})
- Time zone: UTC-6 (Central (CST))
  - Summer (DST): UTC-5 (CDT)
- FIPS code: 27-69556
- GNIS feature ID: 0665968

West Newton Township is a township in Nicollet County, Minnesota, United States. West Newton was named primarily for the steamboat, the West Newton, which made the trip from Fort Snelling to Fort Ridgely in 1853. "This was the first steamer that had ascended the Minnesota river any distance above the mouth of the Blue Earth." The population was 517 at the 2000 census. The unincorporated community of St. George is located within the township.

West Newton Township was organized in 1858.

== Geography ==
According to the United States Census Bureau, the township has a total area of 38.2 square miles (99.0 km^{2}), of which 37.7 square miles (97.5 km^{2}) is land and 0.6 square mile (1.5 km^{2}) (1.47%) is water.

The ghost town of West Newton is located within section 30 of the township.

== Demographics ==
As of the census of 2000, there were 517 people, 180 households, and 145 families residing in the township. The population density was 13.7 people per square mile (5.3/km^{2}). There were 187 housing units at an average density of 5.0/sq mi (1.9/km^{2}). The racial makeup of the township was 99.81% White and 0.19% African American. Hispanic or Latino of any race were 0.19% of the population.

There were 180 households, out of which 38.3% had children under the age of 18 living with them, 73.3% were married couples living together, 3.3% had a female householder with no husband present, and 19.4% were non-families. 17.2% of all households were made up of individuals, and 6.1% had someone living alone who was 65 years of age or older. The average household size was 2.87 and the average family size was 3.27.

In the township the population was spread out, with 28.6% under the age of 18, 7.0% from 18 to 24, 26.1% from 25 to 44, 28.4% from 45 to 64, and 9.9% who were 65 years of age or older. The median age was 39 years. For every 100 females, there were 102.0 males. For every 100 females age 18 and over, there were 110.9 males.

The median income for a household in the township was $50,313, and the median income for a family was $55,000. Males had a median income of $35,865 versus $19,479 for females. The per capita income for the township was $20,533. About 2.8% of families and 4.6% of the population were below the poverty line, including 4.0% of those under age 18 and none of those age 65 or over.
