= Harkin's General Store =

- Alexander Harkin Store
- U.S. National Register of Historic Places
- Minnesota State Register of Historic Places
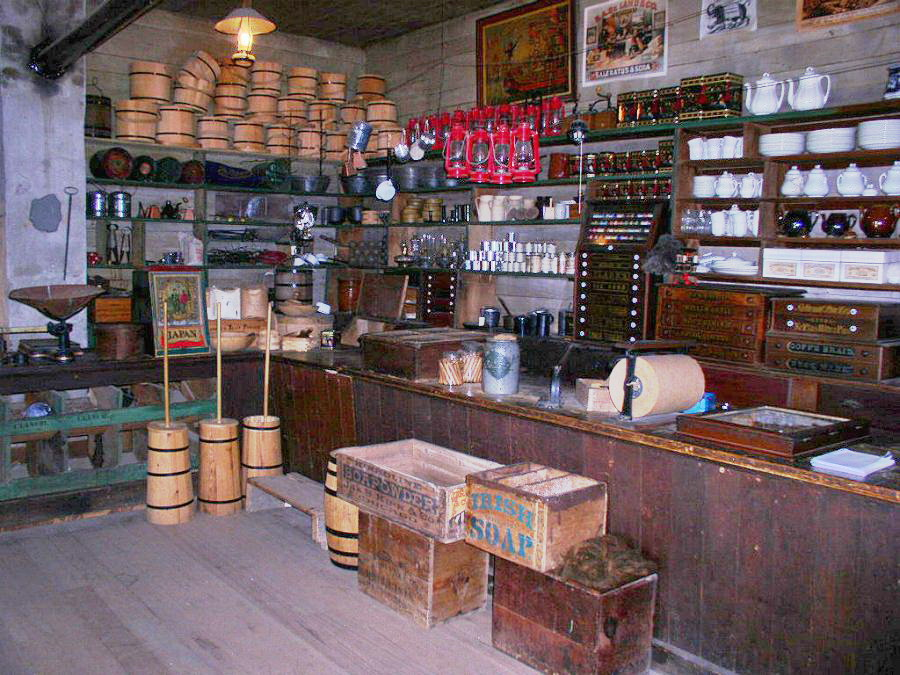
- Interior of Harkin's General Store

- Location within Minnesota Location within the United States
- Nearest city: New Ulm, Minnesota
- Coordinates: 44°23′13″N 94°35′56″W
- Built: 1871
- NRHP reference No.: 73000989
- Added to NRHP: June 04, 1973

Harkin's General Store is all that remains of West Newton, in Nicollet County, Minnesota, United States. Alexander Harkin opened the store as combination general store and post office in 1867 in the growing town of West Newton. The town fell into decline after four years of locust swarms devastated southern Minnesota, and the railroad extended away from West Newton. The store closed in 1901.

Most of the stock was left when the store was closed and abandoned, and remains today as a museum currently managed by the Minnesota Historical Society.
