= West Newton, Minnesota =

Ghost town in West Newton Township, Minnesota, US

Coordinates: 44.386°N 94.596°W

West Newton is a ghost town in section 30 of West Newton Township in Nicollet County, Minnesota, United States, along the Minnesota River, near New Ulm.

== History ==
West Newton was named in part to honor James Newton, an early settler who emigrated from Kentucky, and partly to honor the steamboat West Newton, which was built in 1852 and sank at Alma, Wisconsin, in September 1853. The community had a post office from 1862 until 1910. Harkin's General Store is listed on the National Register of Historic Places.

== Notable people ==
- John Hubert Peschges, second Roman Catholic Bishop of the Diocese of Crookston
