= Catholic Family News =

Traditionalist Catholic monthly newspaper

- December 2006 front page
- Type: Monthly newspaper
- Format: tabloid
- Owner(s): Catholic Family Ministries, Inc.
- Editor-in-chief: Brian McCall
- Managing editor: Matt Gaspers
- Founded: 1994; 32 years ago
- Political alignment: Traditional Catholic
- Language: English
- Headquarters: 1151 Sheridan Dr. Tonawanda, NY
- ISSN: 1084-5682
- OCLC number: 33088874
- Website: www.catholicfamilynews.org

Catholic Family News (CFN) was a Traditionalist Catholic monthly publication of Catholic Family Ministries. It has announced that its December, 2025 issue will be its last issue.

The Southern Poverty Law Center classified it as a hate group for their adherence to integralism and the alleged Anti-Masonry, Anti-Communism, antisemitism and other conspiracy theories.

== History ==
Founded in 1994, CFN was run for many years by John Vennari (1958-2017). Vennari served as both editor and publisher of CFN. He was succeeded as managing editor by Matt Gaspers. Brian McCall became editor-in-chief in 2018.

Former Disney actor Murray Rundus joined CFN as Production Manager in 2023.

== Editorial views ==
An associate and collaborator of Nicholas Gruner, Vennari was a frequent contributor to Gruner's Fatima Crusader. Catholic Family News has a close relationship with Marcel Lefebvre's Society of Saint Pius X (SSPX). Vennari's funeral service, at his request, was conducted by members of SSPX. The SSPX publishing house, Angelus Press, is a CFN advertiser and CFN editor Brian McCall has appeared at conferences sponsored by Angelus Press. In June 2018, shortly after becoming editor-in-chief, McCall interviewed Niklaus Pfluger, First General Assistant of SSPX.

In April 2019, McCall was one of nineteen original signatories to an "open letter" accusing Pope Francis of heresy.

The paper also includes devotional materials, and articles on historic Roman Catholic teachings and persons, as well as about the history and martyrology of the Eastern Catholic Churches. Articles have appeared on Sister Annella Zervas, O.S.B., Blessed Theodore Romzha, Mother Agnes Hart, and Father Leo Heinrichs, O.F.M.
