= Timothy J. Corbett =

American Catholic clergyman

His Eminence, The Most Reverend Timothy J. Corbett
- Bishop of Crookston; Titular Bishop of Vita
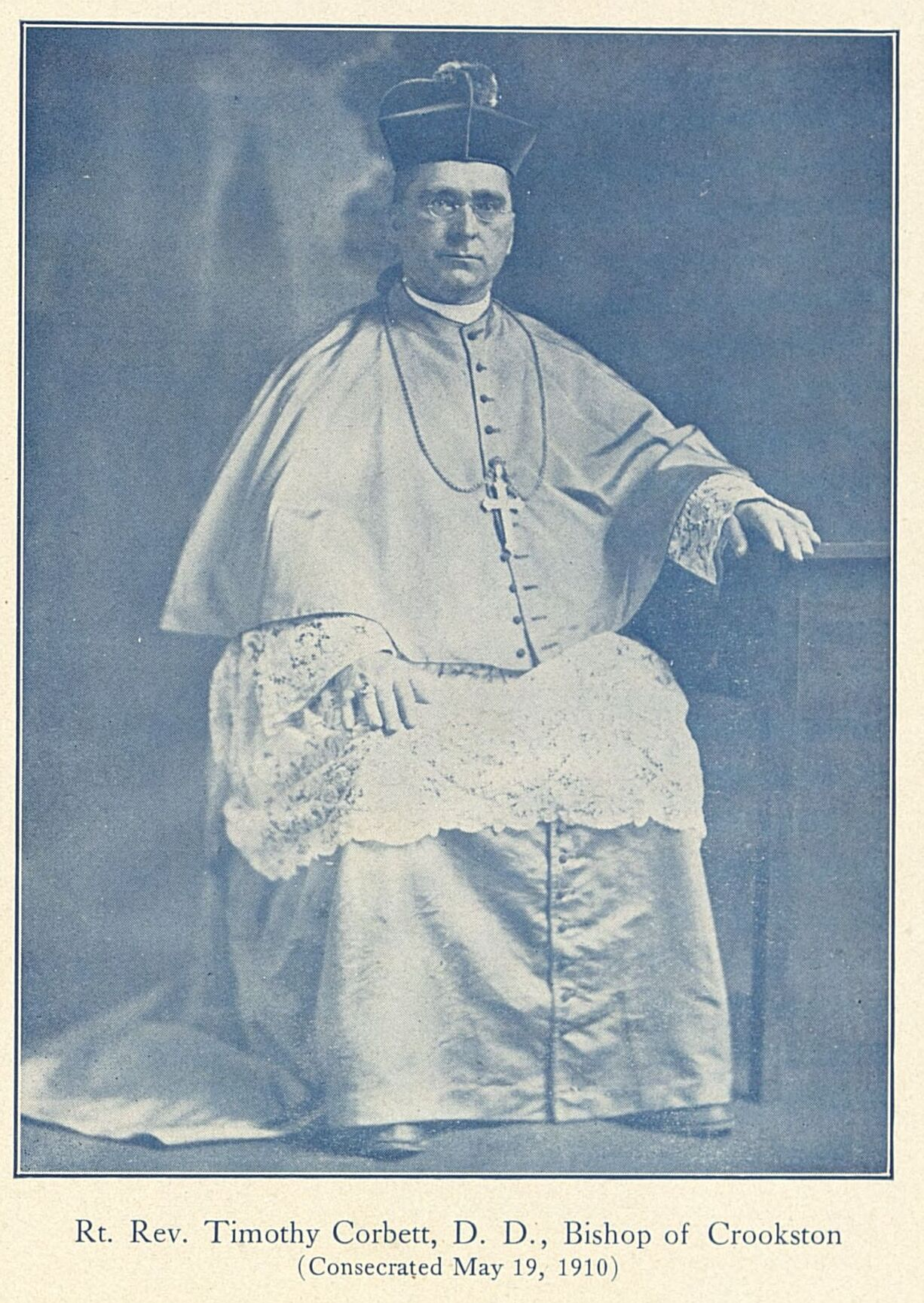
- Corbett, circa 1911
- Church: Roman Catholic Church
- See: Diocese of Crookston
- Elected: May 19, 1910 to June 25, 1938
- Successor: John Hubert Peschges

Orders
- Ordination: June 12, 1886 by John Joseph Williams
- Consecration: May 19, 1910 by John Ireland

Personal details
- Born: June 10, 1858 Mendota, Minnesota, US
- Died: July 20, 1939 (aged 81) Crookston, Minnesota, US
- Education: Grand Seminary of Montreal; St. John's Seminary
- Motto: Veritas pax justitia (Truth, peace, justice)

Timothy J. Corbett (June 10, 1858 – July 20, 1939) was an American prelate of the Catholic Church. He served as bishop of Crookston in Minnesota from 1910 to 1938.

== Biography ==
=== Early life ===
Timothy Corbett was born on June 10, 1858, in Mendota, Minnesota, and raised in Minneapolis. He was privately educated by Reverend James McGolrick, who sent him to study at the lower seminary of Meximieux in France in 1876. In 1880, Corbett enrolled at the Grand Seminary of Montreal in Montreal, Quebec. He completed his studies at St. John's Seminary in Boston, Massachusetts.

=== Priesthood ===
Corbett was ordained to the priesthood in Boston by Archbishop John Williams for the Archdiocese of Saint Paul on June 12, 1886. With the establishment of the Diocese of Duluth in 1889, Corbett was named rector of the Sacred Heart Cathedral in Duluth, Minnesota. He also served as chancellor of the new diocese.

=== Bishop of Crookston ===
On April 9, 1910, Corbett was appointed the first bishop of the newly erected Diocese of Crookston by Pope Pius X. He received his episcopal consecration at Saint Paul Seminary on May 19, 1910, from Archbishop John Ireland, with Bishops James McGolrick and James Trobec serving as co-consecrators. During his 28-year tenure, Corbett established over 50 churches and 12 schools through soliciting funds.

=== Retirement and legacy ===
On June 25, 1938, Corbett's resignation as bishop of Crookston was accepted by Pope Pius XI, who appointed him titular bishop of Vita. Timothy Corbett died on July 20, 1939, in Crookston at age 81.

Catholic Church titles
Preceded by -	Bishop of Crookston; 1910–1938	Succeeded by John Hubert Peschges
