= Diocese of Crookston =

Latin Catholic jurisdiction in the US

Coordinates: 47°46′27″N 96°36′29″W

Diocese of Crookston Diœcesis Crookstoniensis
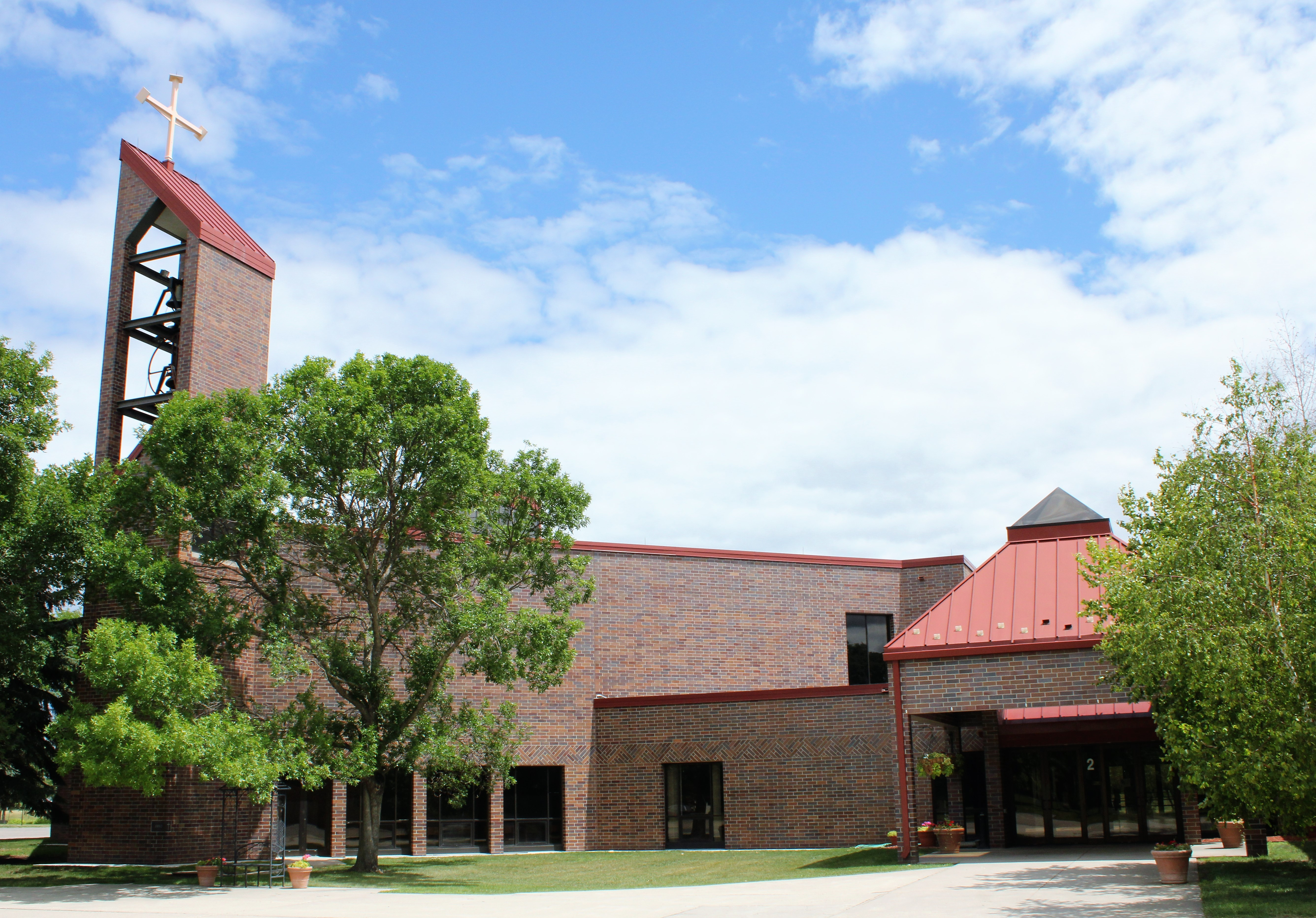
- Cathedral of the Immaculate Conception

- Coat of arms

Location
- Country: United States
- Territory: 14 counties in northwestern Minnesota
- Ecclesiastical province: Saint Paul and Minneapolis

Statistics
- Area: 17,210 sq mi (44,600 km^{2})
- Population: Total; Catholics: (as of 2006); 250,941; 35,780 (14.3%)
- Parishes: 67

Information
- Denomination: Catholic
- Sui iuris church: Latin Church
- Rite: Roman Rite
- Established: December 31, 1909
- Cathedral: Cathedral of the Immaculate Conception
- Patron saint: Immaculate Conception

Current leadership
- Pope: Leo XIV
- Bishop: Andrew H. Cozzens
- Metropolitan Archbishop: Bernard Hebda
- Bishops emeritus: Victor Hermann Balke; Michael Joseph Hoeppner

Map

Website
- crookston.org

The Diocese of Crookston (Latin: Diœcesis Crookstoniensis) is a diocese of the Catholic Church in northwestern Minnesota in the United States. It is a suffragan diocese in the ecclesiastical province of the metropolitan Archdiocese of St. Paul and Minneapolis. Its mother church is the Cathedral of the Immaculate Conception in Crookston. As of 2026, the bishop is Andrew Cozzens.

== Territory ==
The Diocese of Crookston comprises 14 counties in Minnesota: Kittson, Roseau, Lake of the Woods, Marshall, Polk, Red Lake, Pennington, Clearwater, Beltrami, Norman, Mahnomen, Hubbard, Clay and Becker.

== History ==
The first Catholic priest to serve in present-day Minnesota was Jean-Pierre Aulneau, a French missionary at Fort Saint Charles near Penasse. He was killed by a Sioux war party in 1736. The Minnesota area went through several Catholic jurisdictions before the creation of the Diocese of Crookston:

- Diocese of Saint Louis (1826 to 1837)
- Diocese of Dubuque (1837 to 1850)
- Diocese of Saint Paul (1850 to 1879)

St. Mary's Mission at Red Lake was established in 1858 on the Red Lake Reservation to serve the Ojibwe/Chippewa people in the region. In 1902, the Sisters of Saint Benedict from Duluth opened St. Vincent's Hospital in Crookston.

=== 1900 to 1960 ===
The Diocese of Crookston was erected on December 31, 1909, by Pope Pius X with territory taken from the Archdiocese of Saint Paul. The pope named Timothy J. Corbett of Saint Paul as the first bishop of Crookston. During his 28-year tenure, Corbett established over 50 churches and 12 schools through soliciting funds. In 1913, he dedicated the first Cathedral of the Immaculate Conception in Crookston. In 1920, the Sisters of Saint Benedict opened a motherhouse in Crookston, establishing themselves as a separate order. Corbett resigned as bishop of Crookston in 1938.

Pope Pius XI named John Peschges of the Diocese of Winona to be the second bishop of Crookston in 1938. Peschges established the Confraternity of Christian Doctrine, a program of religious courses for rural youth, in the diocese and founded other organizations for agricultural development.

After Peschges died in 1944, Pope Pius XII appointed Monsignor Francis Schenk of Saint Paul to succeed him the next year. During his tenure in Crookston, Schenk established over 30 new churches, founded Our Northland Diocese newspaper, and organized diocesan offices of the Catholic Social Service Agency and the Catholic Youth Organization. He also founded summer boarding schools for children of the thousands of Mexican migrant workers who worked in the diocese. Schenk was named bishop of the Diocese of Duluth in 1960.

=== 1960 to 2007 ===
The next bishop of Crookston was Lawrence Glenn of Duluth, appointed by Pope John XXIII in 1960. Glenn retired as bishop ten years later. To succeed Glenn, Pope Paul VI named Kenneth Povish of the Diocese of Saginaw in 1970. During his five-year tenure, Povish implemented the liturgical reforms of the Second Vatican Council of the early 1960s. These included establishing parish councils in each parish and a pastoral council for the diocese. He also supported liturgical reform and the ecumenical movement.

Povish became bishop of the Diocese of Lansing in 1975. Paul VI replaced him in 1976 in Crookston with Victor Balke from the Diocese of Springfield in Illinois. In 1990, Balke dedicated the current Cathedral of the Immaculate Conception. He retired as bishop of Crookston in 2007.

=== 2007 to present ===
Pope Benedict XVI appointed Monsignor Michael Hoeppner of the Diocese of Winona as the next bishop of Crookston in 2007. Following a Vatican investigation of Hoeppner for coercing a sexual abuse victim, Pope Francis ordered his resignation as the bishop of Crookston. The pope accepted it on April 13, 2021.In 2021, Pope Francis named Auxiliary Bishop Andrew Cozzens of Saint Paul and Minneapolis as the next bishop of Crookston.

The diocese opened the cause for the canonization of Anna Zervas, known by her religious name of Mary Annella, in 2025. A member of the Benedictine Order in St. Joseph, Minnesota, Zervas died in 1926. Soon after her death, people began reporting intercessions from her to the church.

=== Sex abuse ===
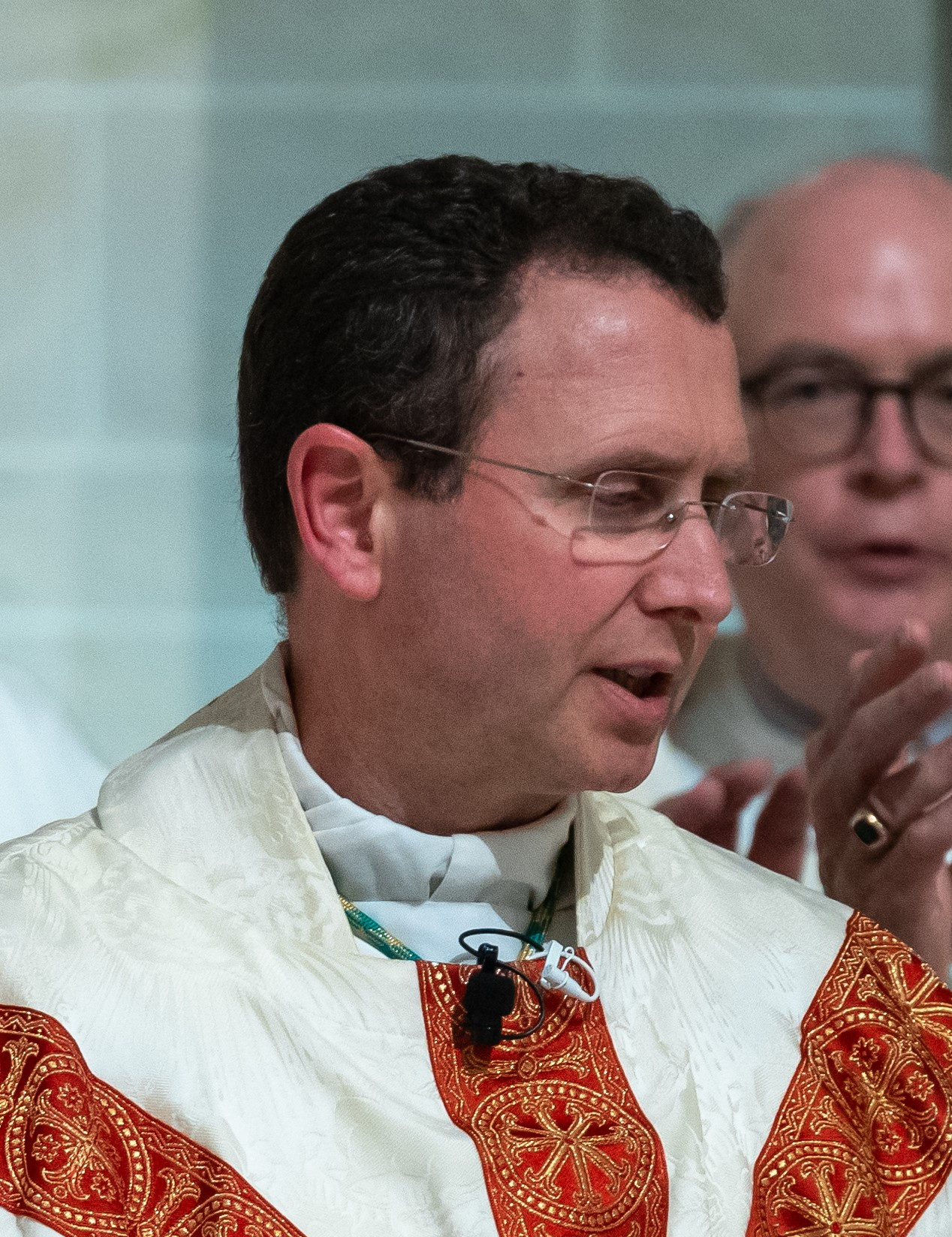
Bishop Cozzens (2022)

In 2006, a teenage girl accused the priest Joseph Palanivel Jeyapaul of raping and sodomizing her on many occasions in Greenbush when she was age 14 in 2004 and 2005. He arrived in the diocese as a visiting priest from India in 2004, but returned home in 2005 to visit a sick relative. Bishop Balke then revoked permission for Jeyapaul to return to Crookston. The girl sued the diocese in 2009. The diocese soon received a similar accusation against him from another woman. In November 2014, the United States extradited Jeyapaul from India to face sexual assault charges in Minnesota. Jeyapaul pleaded guilty to sexual assault in May 2015 and was sentenced to one year in prison, followed by deportation to India.

In 2011, Ronald Vasek, a former diaconate candidate, reported to the diocese that Roger Grundhaus, a diocesan priest, had sexually abused him when he was a teenager during a trip to Ohio in 1971. In October 2015, Bishop Hoeppner asked Vasek to sign a letter recanting his accusations against Grundhaus, which he did. In May 2017, Vasek sued Hoeppner on ground of coercion, the first such lawsuit filed against a Catholic bishop in the United States. In September 2017, Vasek, the diocese and Hoeppner reached a financial settlement. In September 2019, Archbishop Bernard Hebda of St. Paul and Minneapolis began an investigation into Hoeppner's actions, the first investigation of an American bishop for failing to the follow the sexual abuse procedures in the 2019 papal document Vos estis lux mundi. Hoeppner resigned in 2021.

In July 2019, the diocese announced a $5 million settlement with 15 alleged victims of sexual abuse by diocesan clergy.

== Bishops ==
1. Timothy J. Corbett (1910–38)
2. John Hubert Peschges (1938–44)
3. Francis Joseph Schenk (1945–60), appointed Bishop of Duluth
4. Lawrence Alexander Glenn (1960–70)
5. Kenneth Joseph Povish (1970–75), appointed Bishop of Lansing
6. Victor Hermann Balke (1976–2007)
7. Michael Joseph Hoeppner (2007–2021)
8. Andrew H. Cozzens (2021–present)

== Education ==
As of 2025, Diocese of Crookston has eight elementary schools and one high school, Sacred Heart High School in East Grand Forks.
