= Andrew Cozzens =

American Catholic bishop

The Most Reverend Andrew Cozzens
- Bishop of Crookston
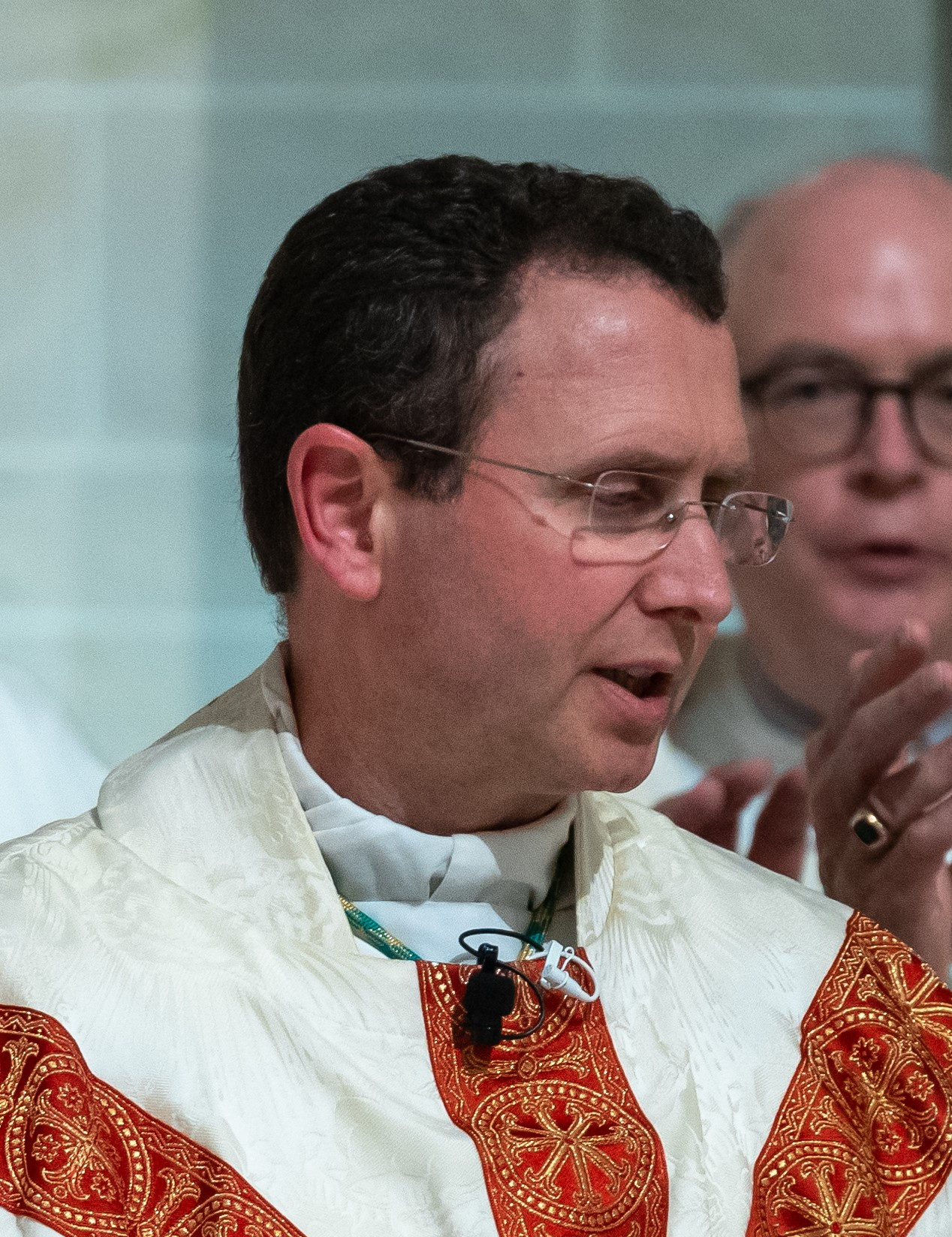
- Cozzens in 2022
- Church: Catholic Church
- Diocese: Crookston
- Appointed: October 18, 2021
- Installed: December 6, 2021
- Predecessor: Michael Joseph Hoeppner
- Previous post: Auxiliary Bishop of Saint Paul and Minneapolis and Titular Bishop of Bisica (2013-2021)

Orders
- Ordination: May 31, 1997 by Harry J. Flynn
- Consecration: December 9, 2013 by John Clayton Nienstedt, Harry J. Flynn, and Paul Sirba

Personal details
- Born: August 3, 1968 (age 57) Denver, Colorado
- Motto: Praebe nobis cor tuum (Give us your heart)

Styles of Andrew Harmon Cozzens
- Azure, a St. Andrew’s cross Or charged at center with Sacred Heart of Jesus of Gules, bordered with threefold cord of Or, in chief mountains Azure to pale Azure, from base wavy field of seven of Azure on Argent, to dexter a garb of Immaculate Heart of Mary of Gules with roses Argent, to sinister a garb of Pure Heart of St. Joseph of Gules with lily Argent.
- Reference style: His Excellency; The Most Reverend
- Spoken style: Your Excellency
- Religious style: Bishop

Andrew Harmon Cozzens (born August 3, 1968) is an American Catholic prelate who has served as Bishop of Crookston since 2021. He previously served as an auxiliary bishop for the Archdiocese of Saint Paul and Minneapolis from 2013 to 2021.

== Early life ==
Andrew Cozzens was born on August 3, 1968, in Denver, Colorado, to Jack and Judy Cozzens. After graduating from high school, Cozzens entered Benedictine College in Atchison, Kansas, in 1987. While in college, Cozzens helped found an anti-abortion student group and a charismatic prayer group. In 1990, Cozzens was arrested several times for blocking access to facilities that provided abortion services for women, at one point spending ten days in jail.

After finishing at Benedictine, he spent time traveling across the United States serving as a missionary for NET Ministries. In 1992, he joined Companions of Christ in St. Paul, Minnesota, and worked leading bible study groups for college students. Cozzens entered the Saint Paul Seminary School of Divinity in St. Paul in 1993.

== Priesthood ==
Cozzens was ordained a deacon of the Archdiocese of Saint Paul and Minneapolis at St. Mary's Chapel in Saint Paul Seminary by Bishop Lawrence Welsh on November 23, 1996, and a priest on May 31, 1997, by Archbishop Harry J. Flynn. After his 1997 ordination, the archdiocese assigned Cozzens as an associate pastor first at the Cathedral of Saint Paul in St. Paul (1997 to 2000) and then at Divine Mercy in Faribault, Minnesota (2000 to 2002).

In 2003, Cozzens traveled to Rome to attend the Pontifical University of St. Thomas Aquinas, where he earned a Licentiate of Sacred Theology that same year. Cozzens earned his Doctorate of Sacred Theology from St. Thomas in 2006 with a dissertation entitled Imago Vivens Iesu Christi Sponsi Ecclesiæ: The Priest as a Living Image of Jesus Christ, Bridegroom of the Church, through the Evangelical Counsels.

=== Assistant professor ===
After returning from Rome, Cozzens was appointed as an assistant professor of sacramental theology and director of liturgy at the Saint Paul Seminary.

== Auxiliary Bishop of Saint Paul and Minneapolis ==
Cozzens was appointed titular bishop of Bisica and as an auxiliary bishop of Saint Paul and Minneapolis on October 11, 2013, by Pope Francis. He was consecrated a bishop at the Cathedral of Saint Paul on December 9, 2013, by Archbishop John Nienstedt, with Flynn and Bishop Paul Sirba acting as co-consecrators.

Cozzens was part of an archdiocesan team that in 2014 investigated allegations of misconduct on the part of Nienstedt. Cozzens in 2022 remarked on the investigation:

"It was doomed to fail. We did not have enough objectivity or experience with such investigations. Nor did we have authority to act. Throughout our efforts, we did not know where we could turn for assistance, because there was no meaningful structure to address allegations against bishops."

=== Eucharistic revival ===
At the June 2021 meeting of the United States Conference of Catholic Bishops, Cozzens, as chair of the Evangelization Committee, announced a nationwide Eucharistic Revival to begin in 2022. He said that the revival would focus on small local units such as families. The revival would be organized on the parish, diocesan, and national levels. Cozzens said that the goal of the revival was to foster new and existing devotion to the eucharist.

== Bishop of Crookston ==
On October 18, 2021, Pope Francis named Cozzens as bishop of Crookston. He was installed there on December 6, 2021.

In response to the sexual abuse allegations surrounding former Cardinal Theodore McCarrick, Cozzens in 2022 advocated the establishment of a national review board, composed of clerics and lay members, to investigate allegations of misconduct against American bishops. Cozzens serves as the chair of the board of the National Eucharistic Congress.

Cozzens was the board chair of the organizing committee of the 10th National Eucharistic Congress and led the opening and closing benediction.

=== Statement on 2024 Olympics ===
In July 2024, Cozzens joined other Catholic bishops in condemning a controversial scene in the opening ceremonies of the 2024 Paris Olympics. The performance appeared to recreate Leonardo da Vinci's Last Supper painting, with drag queens portraying the apostles and a DJ as Jesus.

Catholic Church titles
Preceded by -	Auxiliary Bishop of Saint Paul and Minneapolis; 2013–2021	Succeeded by -
Preceded by Michael Joseph Hoeppner	Bishop of Crookston; 2021–present	Succeeded by incumbent
