= Immaculate Heart of Mary Seminary (Winona, Minnesota) =

Roman Catholic college seminary

- Latin: Seminarii Immaculati Cordis Mariæ
- Motto: Ecce Quam Bonum
- Motto in English: Behold How Good
- Type: Diocesan, Roman Catholic seminary
- Established: 1948
- Endowment: Created 1989; Incorporated 1991
- Location: 750 Terrace Heights Winona, MN 55987, Winona, Minnesota, United States
- Sponsoring Diocese: Diocese of Winona-Rochester
- Website: www.ihmseminary.org

Immaculate Heart of Mary (IHM) Seminary is a Roman Catholic college seminary for men in Winona, Minnesota, in the United States that is sponsored by the Diocese of Winona-Rochester.

Located adjacent to Saint Mary's University of Minnesota, IHM has provided college-level seminary training since 1948. Seminarians come primary from dioceses in the Midwestern United States to live at IHM and take classes from Saint Mary's. As of 2024, Bishop Robert E. Barron is the president of the IHM advisory board.

On completion of their course work, seminarians at IHM receive a Bachelor of Arts degree in philosophy.

== History ==
=== 1912 to 1951 ===
In 1912, Bishop Patrick Heffron of Winona founded Saint Mary's College in Winona. Its mission was providing a college education for seminarians and male lay people.The diocese in 1943 transferred operation of Saint Mary's to the Brothers of the Christian Schools (De La Salle Brothers).

Bishop Leo Bintz of Winona decided that the seminarians attending Saint Mary's needed their own seminary residence. He opened IHM in 1947. The first group of seminarians moved into IHM that fall and started classes at Saint Mary's. Their teachers included Reverend George Speltz, a future bishop of the Diocese of St. Cloud, and Reverend William Magee. IHM was officially founded and canonically erected on July 16, 1948, with Speltz as its first rector. That first year, IHM had an enrollment of twenty-five students. Its first graduate was Paul Halloran in 1949. IHM opened its first dormitory, Kelly Hall, in 1951.

=== 1951 to 1973 ===
IHM in 1951 began construction of Mary Hall (now called the convent or guesthouse). It was needed as a residence for the Dominican Sisters who provided housekeeping and other services for IHM; It was completed in 1954. Saint Leo the Great Hall was opened in 1961. In 1974, IHM established the Fitzgerald Retreat Center in Leo Hall for the use of diocesan priests.

In 1963, Fitzgerald named Monsignor Joseph McGinnis as the second rector of IHM. During the 1966–1967 academic year, IHM reached its peak total enrollment, with 90 seminarians The third rector, Monsignor Roy Literski, was appointed by Fitzgerald in 1968. Bishop Loras Watters of Winona named Reverend Robert Brom in 1970 as rector. That same year, the School Sisters of Notre Dame assumed the duties of the Dominican Sisters at IHM.

=== 1973 to present ===
IHM celebrated its 25th anniversary in 1973 with an alumni gathering. During 1986–1987, IHM was studied under the Papal Seminary Study. The SJV Chapel was renovated again in 1986. In June 1988, a 40th anniversary alumni reunion was held at IHM. In 1989, the IHM Seminary Endowment fund was created.

Beginning in 1994, IHM and the priest faculty and staff began all sacramental ministry at Saint Mary's College, which was renamed a university in 1995. The second Papal Seminary Study was undertaken in the fall of 2005 and minor renovations of Kelly Hall were completed between 2002 and 2008 In August 2006, IHM broke ground on the Pope John Paul II Memorial Garden.

In 2016, IHM began a major renovation of Kelly Hall. The resident seminarians were relocated to a dormitory at Saint Mary's during the construction. IHM in 2018 built a four-story addition to connect Kelly Hall and Leo Hall. This addition created study and community rooms on each of the residence floors.

== Faculty ==
As of 2025, the following clerics are IHM staffers:

- Very Reverend Jason Kern - rector, appointed by Bishop Robert Barron in 2025
- Very Reverend Martin T. Schaefer – vice-rector and dean of formation.
- Reverend Matthew J. Fasnacht – director of spiritual life.
- Reverend Matthew Wagner - assistant dean of formation.

== Buildings ==
=== Kelly Hall ===
Kelly Hall is the original seminary building at IHM. It houses the main student residence, guest suites, seminary offices, and the SJV Chapel.

In 1950, Bishop Edward Fitzgerald of Winona began planning Kelly Hall, naming it in honor of Bishop Francis Martin Kelly, the third bishop of Winona. The De La Salle Brothers donated land to IHM for the new building. Fitzgerald broke ground on Kelly Hall on May 1, 1950, and Binz, then coadjutor archbishop of the Archdiocese of Dubuque, laid the cornerstone on June 15, 1950. Students moved into Kelly Hall in the spring of 1951.

=== Saint Leo the Great Hall ===
Saint Leo the Great Hall (Leo Hall) houses the secondary student residence (primarily for Propaedeutic seminarians), guest rooms and the Sedes Sapientiæ Chapel. Leo Hall was built in 1961 and named after Leo Binz. Leo Hall was blessed by the Apostolic Delegate Archbishop Egidio Vagnozzi, in 1962, with Binz in attendance at the ceremony.

== Chapels ==
=== Saint John Vianney Chapel ===
The Saint John Vianney Chapel (SJV Chapel), named after John Vianney, is located in Kelly Hall. It is the main chapel of IHM and the eucharist is reserved there. The chapel offers daily mass and adoration of the eucharist. The seminarian pray Lauds and vespers in common in the chapel.

Fitzgerald dedicated the altar in the SJV Chapel on April 22, 1951, and Speltz celebrated the first mass there on March 2, 1952. IHM remodeled the chapel in 1970 in accordance with liturgical changes from the Second Vatican Council.

- The stained-glass windows in the SJV Chapel depict several saints and the gifts of the Holy Spirit.
- The stained-glass windows in the chapel sanctuary depict the archangels Michael, Gabriel, and Raphael.

=== Sedes Sapientiæ Chapel ===
The Sedes Sapientiæ Chapel is located in Leo Hall. It is a smaller devotional chapel that is used as the primary chapel for the Propaedeutic seminarians, as welll as devotions, private prayer and masses for small groups. Seminarians often meet in small groups at this chapel to pray the rosary or the Liturgy of the Hours. The eucharist is reserved in this chapel.

The chapel is named for Mary, mother of Jesus, under the title of Our Lady, Seat of Wisdom. Its stained-glass windows depict Mary, Sedes Sapientiæ, and the seven sacraments. The Sedes Sapientiæ Chapel was dedicated by Bishop Bernard Harrington on Oct. 23, 2003.

== Pope John Paul II Memorial Garden ==
The Pope John II Memorial Garden is a multi-acre garden located in front of Kelly hall. It is designed for seminarians and the general public to use for prayer and quiet relaxation. It is also the site of outdoor masses. The memorial garden is shaped like a Celtic cross, mirroring the cross on the IHM bell tower.

After the 2005 death of Pope John Paul II, the IHM rector decided to create a memorial garden to honor him. As John Paul II was devoted to the stations of the cross, IHM designed the garden to center around them. IHM broke ground for the memorial garden in August 2006. The stations, designed by American artist Lynn Kircher, were installed in November 2006. A sculpture of the burial shroud of Christ was placed in the memorial garden in 2007, along with the fountain and the grotto. The memorial garden opened in the summer of 2007

=== Stations of the cross ===
The memorial garden contains the traditional 14 stations of the cross along with two extra stations were added off the main path. These two extra stations are Jesus in the Garden of Gethsemane and the Resurrection of Jesus.

=== Grotto and altar ===
Set in local limestone, the outdoor grotto and altar provide an area for outdoor gatherings and mass The grotto is dedicated to Mary, mother of Jesus, with statues of Our Lady and Our Lady of Guadalupe, and provides space for votive candles and private prayer.

=== Shroud of Christ ===
Located in the center of the garden is the empty tomb of Christ, with a life-sized solid bronze burial shroud, designed by Kircher. Located throughout the center of the garden, cast bronze birds perch on the outdoor works of art.

=== Fountain ===
The New Life fountain is located next to the empty tomb. The fountain pushes water up through a 5-foot-high (1.5 m) limestone boulder. The fountain is meant to remind visitors of the bible account of Moses bringing water from a rock when the Israelites were traveling through the wilderness.

== Course study ==
The curriculum at IHM is designed to proved a Bachelor of Arts degree in philosophy to its students as part of their early formation for the priesthood. Most of its incoming students do not have any college degree. IHM also requires its students to take courses in theology and Latin. Students can create a double major through Saint Mary's University so long as they meet the basic requirements for the philosophy major.

As of 2024, students must take courses in the following areas of study to fulfill the philosophy requirements:

- Logic
- Thales through Aristotle
- Moral theory
- Augustine through Ockham
- Bacon through Hegel
- Kierkegaard through Wittgenstein
- Epistemology
- Metaphysics
- Thomas Aquinas

== Seminary motto and crest ==
The official motto of IHM is the Latin text of Psalm 133:1 in the Old Testament: Ecce quam bonum et quam iucundum habitare fratres, fratres in unum (Behold how good and how splendid where brothers dwell as one.) The Latin motto is often shortened to simply Ecce Quam Bonum (Behold How Good) as seen on the seminary crest.

The current IHM crest was designed by the ninth rector, Father James Steffes in 2002. The base of the crest is the red shield, symbolizing both the enlightening guidance of the Holy Spirit and the courage needed to respond to God's call of discernment. At the top of the shield is a flur-de-lis, a symbol of Mary as well as of Joseph, the guardian of Jesus and disciples dedicated to Him. At its center, the crest holds Mary's mystical rose, often portrayed with five petals, in white within a blue diamond. Both the diamond and color white are symbols of virgins, and blue is the traditional color of Mary. Within the mystical rose is the Immaculate Heart of our Heavenly Queen.

In 2019 the seminary began updating branding. This led to a new logo being used for official correspondence instead of the traditional crest. With the appointment of Fr. Jason Kern as rector in 2025, the seminary returned to using the crest and discontinued the new logo.

== Dioceses served ==
As of 2024, IHM was serving the following dioceses:

- Archdiocese of Milwaukee
- Diocese of Crookston
- Diocese of Gary
- Roman Catholic Diocese of Green Bay
- Diocese of Madison
- Diocese of Peoria
- Diocese of Rapid City
- Diocese of Saint Cloud
- Diocese of Winona-Rochester
- Diocese of Sioux City
- Diocese of La Crosse
- Diocese of Reykjavík in Iceland
