= George Henry Speltz =

American prelate

His Excellency. The Most Reverend George Henry Speltz
- Bishop of St. Cloud
- See: Diocese of St. Cloud
- Installed: January 31, 1968
- Term ended: January 13, 1987
- Predecessor: Peter William Bartholome
- Successor: Jerome Hanus
- Other posts: Auxiliary Bishop of Winona (1963–1966); Coadjutor Bishop of St. Cloud (1966–1968)

Orders
- Ordination: June 2, 1940
- Consecration: March 25, 1963

Personal details
- Born: May 29, 1912 Altura, Minnesota, US
- Died: February 1, 2004 (aged 91) St. Cloud, Minnesota, US
- Denomination: Catholic Church
- Coat of arms

George Henry Speltz (May 29, 1912 – February 1, 2004) was an American prelate of the Catholic Church. He served as an auxiliary bishop of the Diocese of Winona in Minnesota (1963–1966) and as bishop of the Diocese of St. Cloud in Minnesota (1968–1987).

== Biography ==
=== Early life ===
George Speltz was born in Altura, Minnesota, one of seven children of Henry and Josephine (née Jung) Speltz. He attended Holy Trinity High School in Rollingstone, Minnesota, and then studied at St. Mary's College in Winona, Minnesota, where he earned a Bachelor of Science degree in 1932. Speltz continued his studies at St. Paul Seminary in St. Paul.

=== Priesthood ===
Speltz was ordained to the priesthood by Bishop Francis Kelly on June 2, 1940. He then served as assistant pastor of St. John's Parish and superintendent of Loretto High School in Caledonia, Minnesota, until 1941. In 1944, he earned a Doctor of Philosophy degree in economics from the Catholic University of America in Washington, D.C. His thesis was entitled: "Decentralization and the Social Obligations of the Land".

Returning to Minnesota, Speltz served as vice-chancellor of the Diocese of Winona (1944–1947) and superintendent of diocesan schools (1945–1949). In 1946, he was named pastor of St. Mary's Church in Minneiska and a professor at St. Mary's College in Winona. He served as the first rector of Immaculate Heart of Mary Seminary in Winona from 1948 to 1963.

=== Auxiliary Bishop of Winona ===
On February 12, 1963, Speltz was appointed auxiliary bishop of Winona and titular bishop of Claneus by Pope John XXIII. He received his episcopal consecration on March 25, 1963, from Bishop Edward Fitzgerald, with Bishops Peter Bartholome and Frederick Freking serving as co-consecrators, at the Cathedral of the Sacred Heart. In addition to his episcopal duties, he served as pastor of St. Mary's Parish in Winona from 1963 to 1966. He also attended the last three sessions of the Second Vatican Council in Rome (1963–65).

=== Coadjutor Bishop and Bishop of Saint Cloud ===
On April 6, 1966, Speltz was appointed coadjutor bishop of the Diocese of St. Cloud by Pope Paul VI. His installation took place on the following June 7. He succeeded Bishop Peter Bartholome as the sixth Bishop of St. Cloud on January 31, 1968. Speltz was president of the National Catholic Rural Life Conference from 1970 to 1972. In 1984, he initiated a ban to deny church weddings to couples who live together before they marry, unless they agreed to live apart before their wedding; he said cohabitation "calls into question fundamental moral values that have long been central to the Christian tradition: the sacred character of sex and of the Christian family."

=== Retirement and legacy ===
On January 13, 1987, Pope John Paul II accepted Speltz's resignation for health reasons as bishop of the Diocese of Saint Cloud.George Speltz died at St. Benedict Senior Community in St. Cloud on February 1, 2004, at age 91.

Catholic Church titles
Preceded by Peter William Bartholome	Bishop of St. Cloud; 1968–1987	Succeeded by Jerome Hanus
