= Loras =

Loras can refer to:

- Loras College, a college in Iowa
- Loras Thomas Lane, an American prelate
- Loras Joseph Watters, an American bishop
- Loras Tyrell, a fictional character in A Song of Ice and Fire
