= Co-Cathedral of St. John the Evangelist (Rochester, Minnesota) =

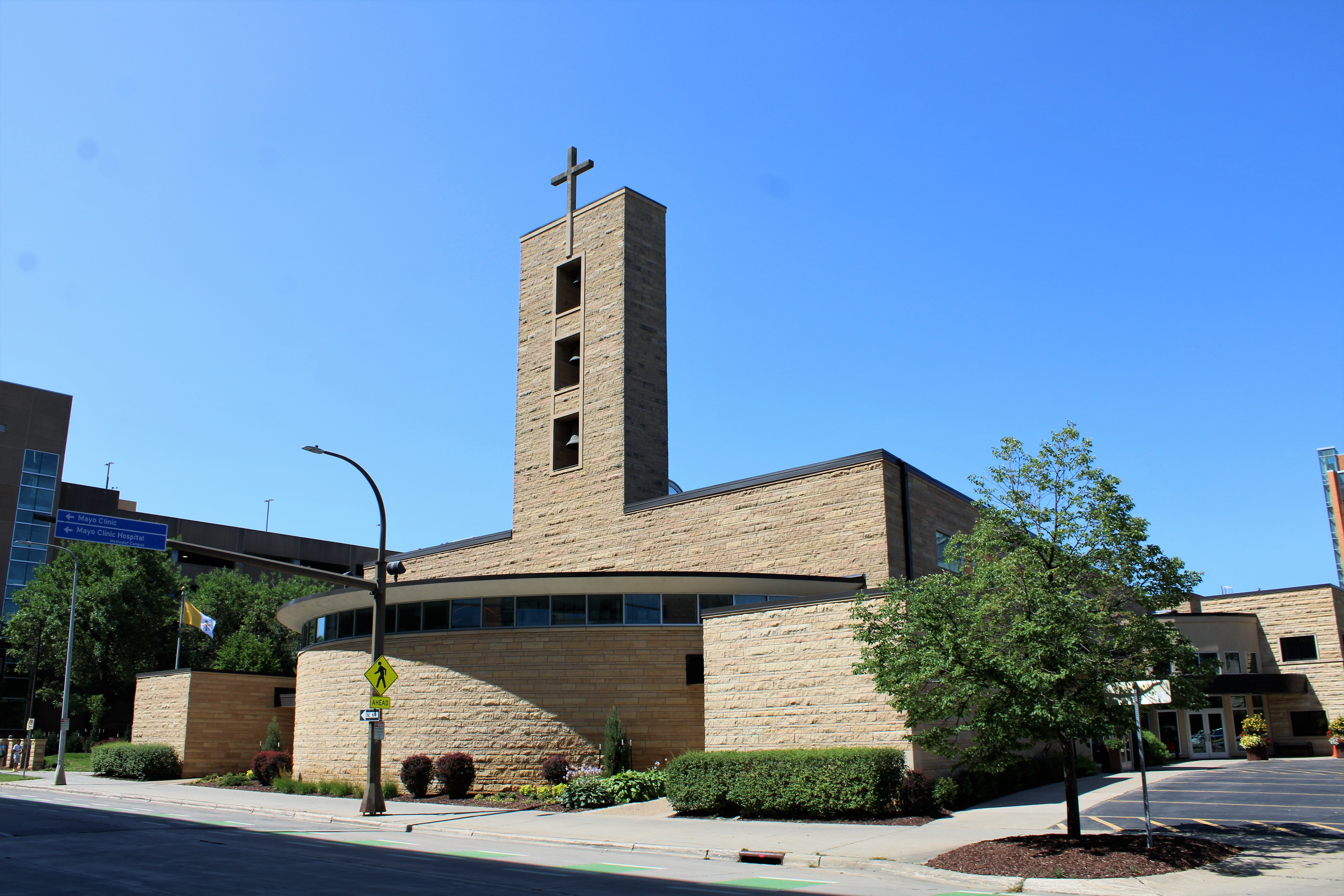
- Co-Cathedral of St. John the Evangelist

- Location within Minnesota Location within the United States
- 44°01′23″N 92°28′07″W
- Location: 11 4th Ave. SW; Rochester, Minnesota
- Country: United States
- Denomination: Roman Catholic Church
- Website: www.sj.org

History
- Status: Co-cathedral/Parish
- Dedicated: 1987

Architecture
- Architect: Edward F. Wirtz
- Style: Modern
- Groundbreaking: 1955
- Completed: 1957

Specifications
- Capacity: 1,200

Administration
- Diocese: Winona-Rochester

Clergy
- Bishop: Most Rev. Robert Barron
- Rector: Msgr. Gerald Mahon

The Co-Cathedral of St. John the Evangelist is a cathedral of the Catholic Church in Rochester, Minnesota, in the United States. It is the co-cathedral and a parish church of the Diocese of Winona-Rochester. The second cathedral in the diocese is the Cathedral of the Sacred Heart in Winona, Minnesota.

== History ==
=== St. John the Evangelist Churches ===
The predecessors to the Co-Cathedral of St. John the Evangelist were three parish churches of the same name. The St. John the Evangelist Parish was established by the priest James Morris in 1863. It was the first Catholic parish in Rochester. At that time, Rochester was part of the Diocese of St. Paul.

The first St. John the Evangelist Church was completed in 1872 and dedicated by Bishop Thomas Grace of St. Paul. By the beginning of the 20th century, the parish needed a new church. The groundbreaking for the second St. John the Evangelist church was in 1900; it was completed in 1905. Faced with a growing school enrollment, the parish in 1913 opened a grade school, a girls' high school and a boys' high school on the church campus.

During the early 1950s, the parish began planning for a new church, hiring the architect Edward F. Wirtz of New Ulm, Minnesota. Construction began in 1955 and was finished in 1957. The parish began the first major renovation of the church in 2001. The worship space was moved to allow parishioners better visibility of the sanctuary during masses. In addition, the parish added a chapel to the structure. The former gymnasium was renovated into a gathering place and a fellowship area. The church was rededicated in 2002.The diocese in 2015 sent an inquiry to the Congregation for Bishops at the Vatican, asking about establishing a co-cathedral in Rochester.

=== Co-Cathedral of St. John the Evangelist ===
On March 27, 2018, Pope Francis replaced the Diocese of Winona with the Diocese of Winona-Rochester, reflected the economic and population growth of Rochester. He designate St. John the Evangelist Church as the Co-Cathedral of St. John the Evangelist.The ceremony elevating the co-cathedral was held on June 24, 2018.

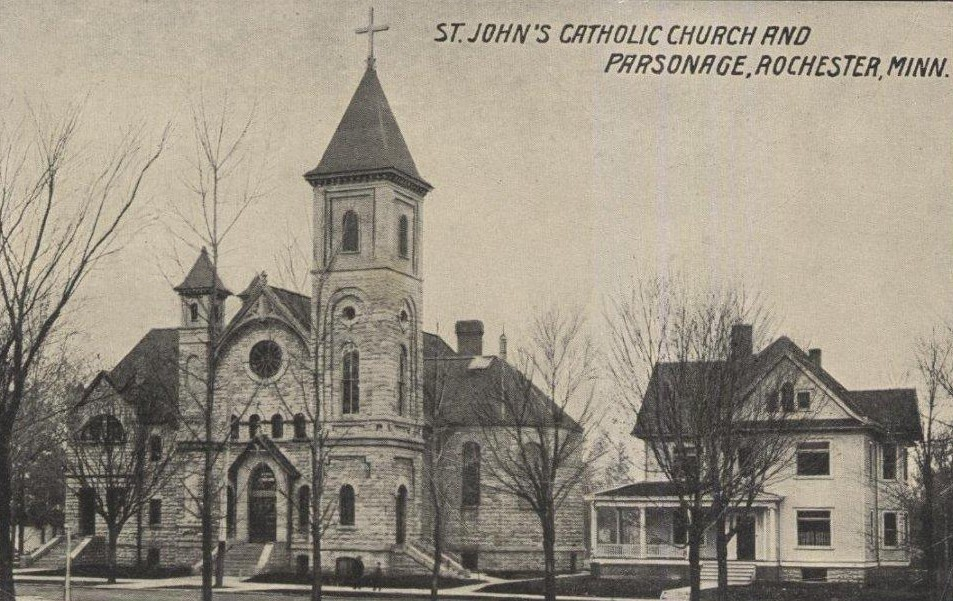
Postcard image of the 1905 church (1907)

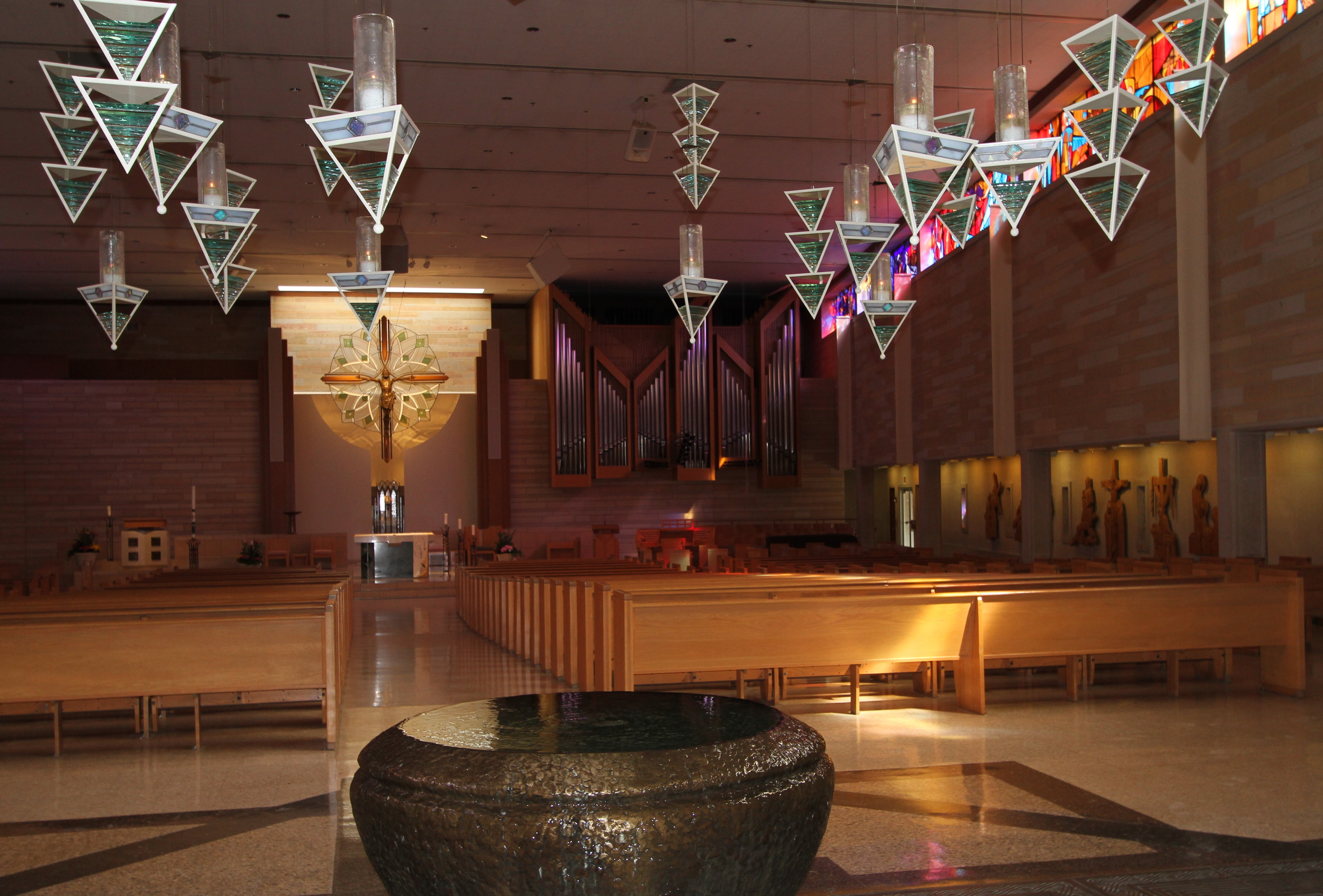
Baptismal font (2018)

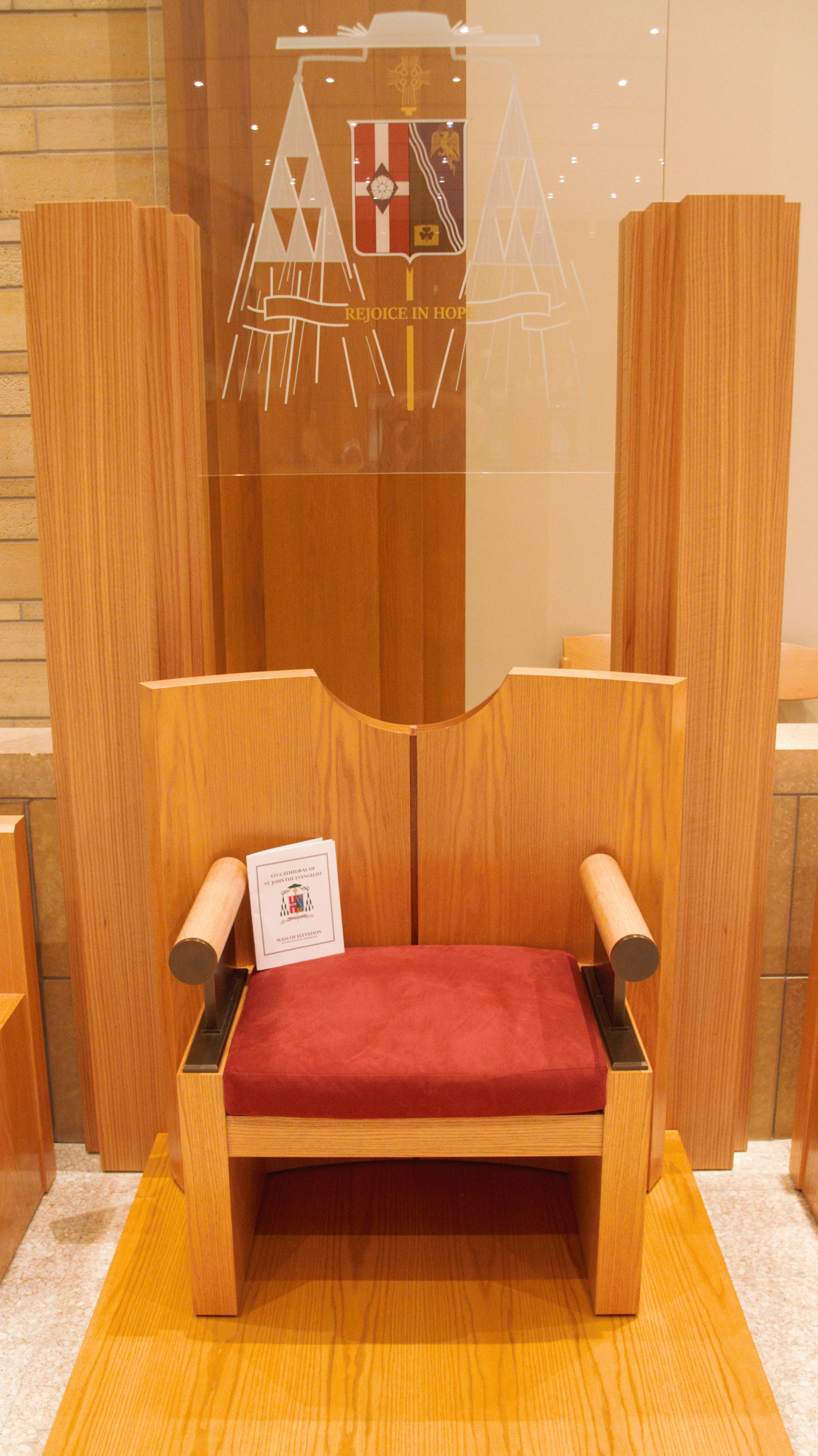
Cathedra (2018)

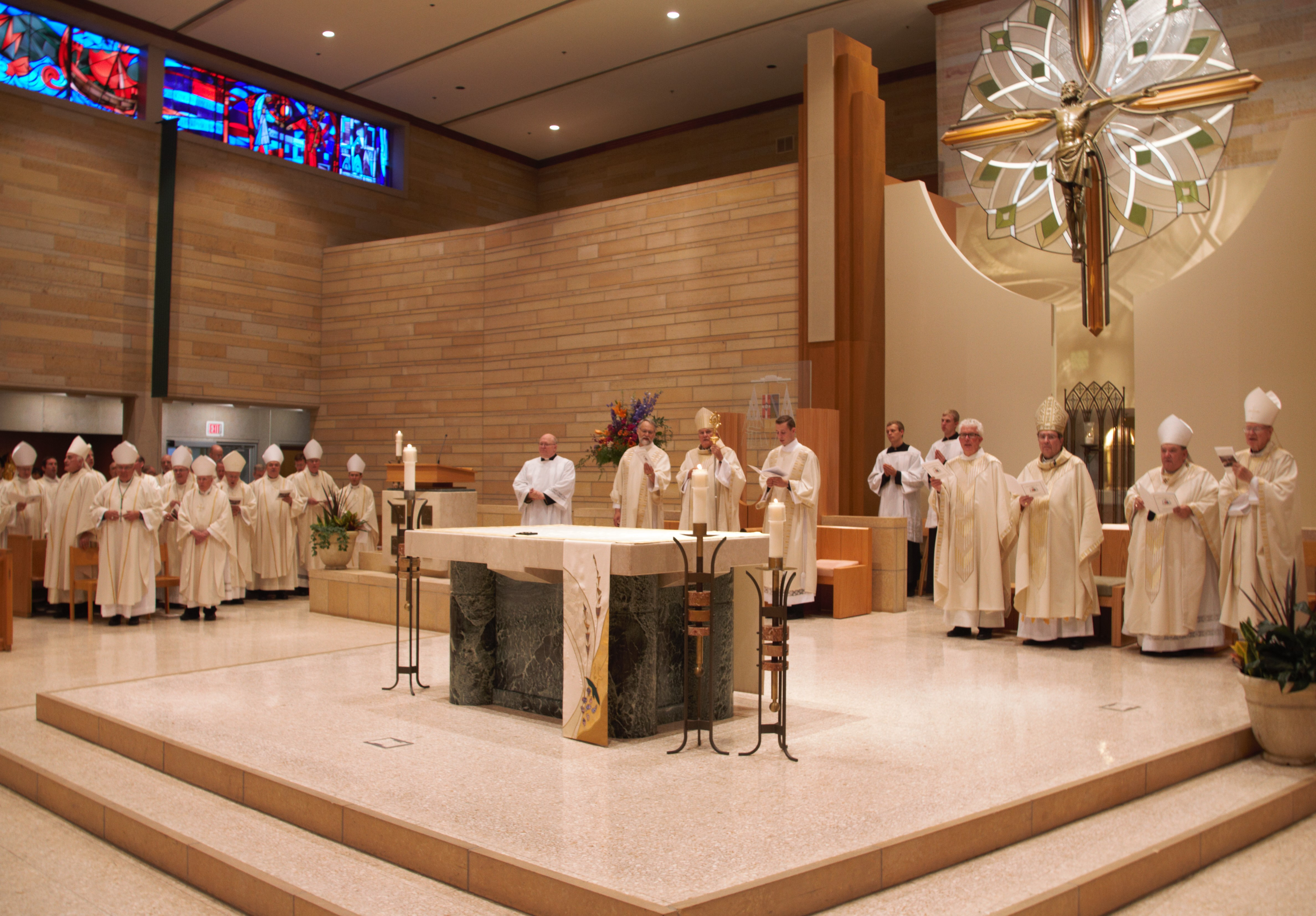
Mass of elevation of St. John the Evangelist (2018)

== Description ==
The Modern structure features an exterior composed of Mankato stone and a seating capacity of 1,200.

== See also ==
- List of Catholic cathedrals in the United States
- List of cathedrals in the United States
