= John George Vlazny =

American prelate of the Catholic Church (1937–2025)

His Excellency, The Most Reverend John George Vlazny
- Archbishop of Portland in Oregon
- Archdiocese: Portland in Oregon
- Appointed: October 28, 1997
- Installed: December 19, 1997
- Retired: January 29, 2013
- Predecessor: Francis George
- Successor: Alexander King Sample
- Previous posts: Bishop of Winona (1987–1997); Auxiliary Bishop of Chicago and Titular Bishop of Stagnum (1983–1987)

Orders
- Ordination: December 20, 1961 by Martin John O’Connor
- Consecration: December 13, 1983 by Joseph Bernardin, Alfred Leo Abramowicz, and Nevin William Hayes

Personal details
- Born: February 22, 1937 Chicago, Illinois, U.S.
- Died: May 23, 2025 (aged 88) Beaverton, Oregon, U.S.
- Education: Pontifical Gregorian University; University of Michigan; Loyola University Chicago
- Motto: Go and make disciples

Styles of John George Vlazny
- Reference style: The Most Reverend
- Spoken style: Your Excellency
- Religious style: Archbishop
- Posthumous style: not applicable

Ordination history of John George Vlazny
History
Episcopal consecration
- Consecrated by: Joseph Bernardin
- Date: December 13, 1983
Episcopal succession
Bishops consecrated by John George Vlazny as principal consecrator
- Robert F. Vasa: January 26, 2000
- Liam Cary: May 18, 2012

John George Vlazny (February 22, 1937 – May 23, 2025) was an American prelate of the Roman Catholic Church who served as the tenth archbishop of the Archdiocese of Portland in Oregon from 1997 to 2013. He was an auxiliary bishop of the Archdiocese of Chicago in Illinois from 1983 to 1987 and bishop of the Diocese of Winona in Minnesota from 1987 to 1997.

== Biography ==
=== Early life ===
Vlazny was born on February 22, 1937, in Chicago, Illinois, to John and Marie (née Brezina) Vlazny, who were of Czech ancestry. His father was originally married to the sister of Vlazny's mother, Hattie Brezina, who died when their daughter, Marcella, was 13. In addition to his half-sister, John Vlazny had a younger sister, Marion. His father, who died from cancer when Vlazny was 18, owned a pharmacy in a three-story building at the corner of 18th and Throop Streets.

Vlazny received his early education at the parochial school of St. Gall Church in Chicago After attending Archbishop Quigley Preparatory Seminary in Chicago, he studied at St. Mary of the Lake Seminary in Mundelein, Illinois where he earned a Bachelor of Arts degree in 1958.

Vlazny continued his studies in Rome, where he attended the Pontifical North American College and the Pontifical Gregorian University. He earned a Bachelor of Sacred Theology in 1960 and a Licentiate of Sacred Theology in 1962.

=== Priesthood ===
On December 20, 1961, Vlazny was ordained to the priesthood for the Archdiocese of Chicago by Archbishop Martin J. O'Connor in Rome at St. Peter's Basilica.

Following his return to Chicago, Vlazny served on the faculty of Quigley Preparatory North in Chicago from 1963 to 1979. He was also dean of studies at Quigley North from 1969 to 1979.

In addition to his academic duties, Vlazny served as an associate pastor at St. Paul of the Cross Parish in Park Ridge, Illinois, from 1962 to 1963. He then served at St. Clement Parish in Lincoln Park, Illinois, from 1963 to 1968, and earned a Master of Arts degree in the classics from the University of Michigan in 1967. Vlazny became an associate pastor at St. Aloysius Parish in the Wicker Park section of Chicago in 1968, and served as its pastor from 1979 to 1981. During this time, one of his seminarian assistants would go on to become Bishop Robert Barron. In 1972, Vlazny earned a Master of Education degree in school administration from Loyola University Chicago.

From 1976 to 1977, Vlazny was president of the Presbyteral Senate for the archdiocese. He also served as a diocesan consultor and member of the Diocesan Clergy Personnel Board. He was appointed rector of Niles College Seminary in 1981.

=== Auxiliary Bishop of Chicago ===
On October 18, 1983, Pope John Paul II appointed Vlazny as an auxiliary bishop of Chicago and Titular Bishop of Stagnum. He received his episcopal consecration on December 13, 1983, from Cardinal Joseph Bernardin, with Bishops Alfred Abramowicz and Nevin Hayes serving as co-consecrators, at Holy Name Cathedral in Chicago. He took as his episcopal motto: "Go and Make Disciples" (Matthew 28:19).

As an auxiliary bishop, Vlazny served as episcopal vicar for Lake County, Illinois and the northwestern part of Cook County, Illinois. He also worked closely with the Office of the Hispanic Apostolate.

=== Bishop of Winona ===
On May 19, 1987, John Paul II appointed Vlazny as the sixth bishop of Winona. He was installed and consecrated on July 29, 1987. During his tenure, Vlazny increased the involvement of the laity, decentralized the diocesan staff, and created the Offices of Youth and Family Life. He also started the tradition of the "Harvest Mass," an annual outdoor liturgy celebrated on a farm in the diocese.

As a member of the United States Conference of Catholic Bishops, Vlazny was elected chair of the Committee on Evangelization in 1993. In 1994, he asked Catholics to consider ending gambling as a source of revenue for parishes and schools.

=== Archbishop of Portland in Oregon ===
On October 28, 1997, John Paul II appointed Vlazny as the tenth archbishop of Portland in Oregon. He was installed and consecrated on December 19, 1997, succeeding Archbishop Francis George.

On October 10, 2000, the archdiocese settled a lawsuit by 22 men who had been sexually abused as altar servers by Reverend Maurice Grammond. The victims lived in Portland, Seaside, Oregon and in Oakridge, Oregon. Vlazny issued a statement of apology that was delivered in masses throughout the archdiocese.

In July 2004, the archdiocese became the first American diocese to file Chapter 11 bankruptcy in response to the Catholic sex abuse cases. Vlazny described his actions by saying, "This is not an effort to avoid responsibility. It is, in fact, the only way I can assure that other claimants can be offered fair compensation."

In January 2010, Vlazny defended his loan of money to Reverend Angel Armando Perez to cover his legal expenses, Perez had been indicted in Marion County, Oregon, on first-degree sexual abuse and abuse of a child in the display of sexually explicit conduct. While condemning Perez's alleged criminal actions. Vlazny expressed a need to help a fellow priest.

In April 2010, Vlazny called for parishioners to cancel their subscriptions to The Oregonian, declaring it guilty of "Catholic bashing." The newspaper's editors, he said, "arrogantly scolded the church for its past failures in handling this matter of child sexual abuse." The newspaper had run an editorial, an editorial cartoon and a syndicated column by E.J. Dionne on how the church had dealt with sexual abuse crime.

On January 29, 2013, Pope Benedict XVI announced the acceptance of Vlazny's resignation as archbishop of Portland and named Bishop Alexander Sample to succeed him.

=== Death ===
Vlazny died at his home in Beaverton, Oregon, on May 23, 2025, at the age of 88.

== Viewpoints ==
=== Euthanasia ===
An opponent of assisted suicide, Vlazny supported the unsuccessful repeal of the Oregon Death with Dignity Act, saying,

Many have expressed a dread about what will happen when the power over life and death may be put into the hands of a society that is driven by economics, expedience and efficiency, a society that flees from suffering, weakness or limitations of any kind.

In 1998, when the first legal assisted suicide occurred in Oregon, Vlazny declared that the death "can only bring anguish to those who have resisted the public policy initiatives that changed the law in Oregon."

=== Abortion ===
During the 2004 U.S. presidential election, Vlazny said Catholic politicians who supported abortion rights, such as Democratic presidential nominee Senator John Kerry, should refrain from receiving communion.

== See also ==
- Catholic Church hierarchy
- Catholic Church in the United States
- Historical list of the Catholic bishops of the United States
- List of Catholic bishops of the United States
- Lists of patriarchs, archbishops, and bishops

Catholic Church titles
Preceded by Francis George	Archbishop of Portland in Oregon; 1997–2013	Succeeded by Alexander King Sample
Preceded by Loras Joseph Watters	Bishop of Winona; 1987–1997	Succeeded by Bernard Joseph Harrington
Preceded by Felixberto Camacho Flores	Titular Bishop of Stagnum; 1983–1987	Succeeded by Curtis J. Guillory
Preceded by -	Auxiliary Bishop of Chicago; 1983–1987	Succeeded by -
