= Diocese of Winona–Rochester =

Ecclesiastical territory of the Catholic Church in southern Minnesota, United States

Coordinates: 44°02′52″N 91°38′25″W

Diocese of Winona–Rochester Dioecesis Vinonaënsis–Roffensis
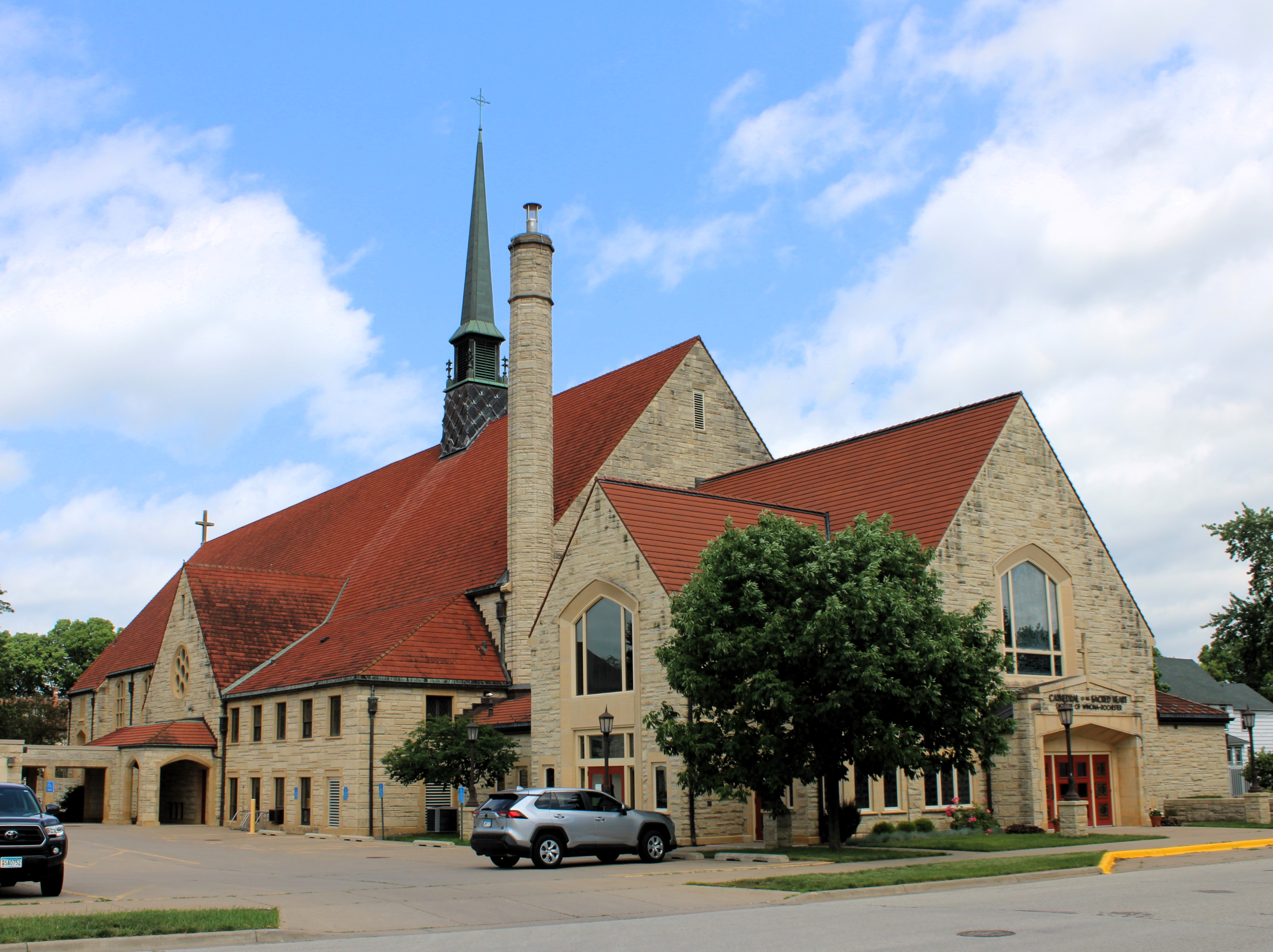
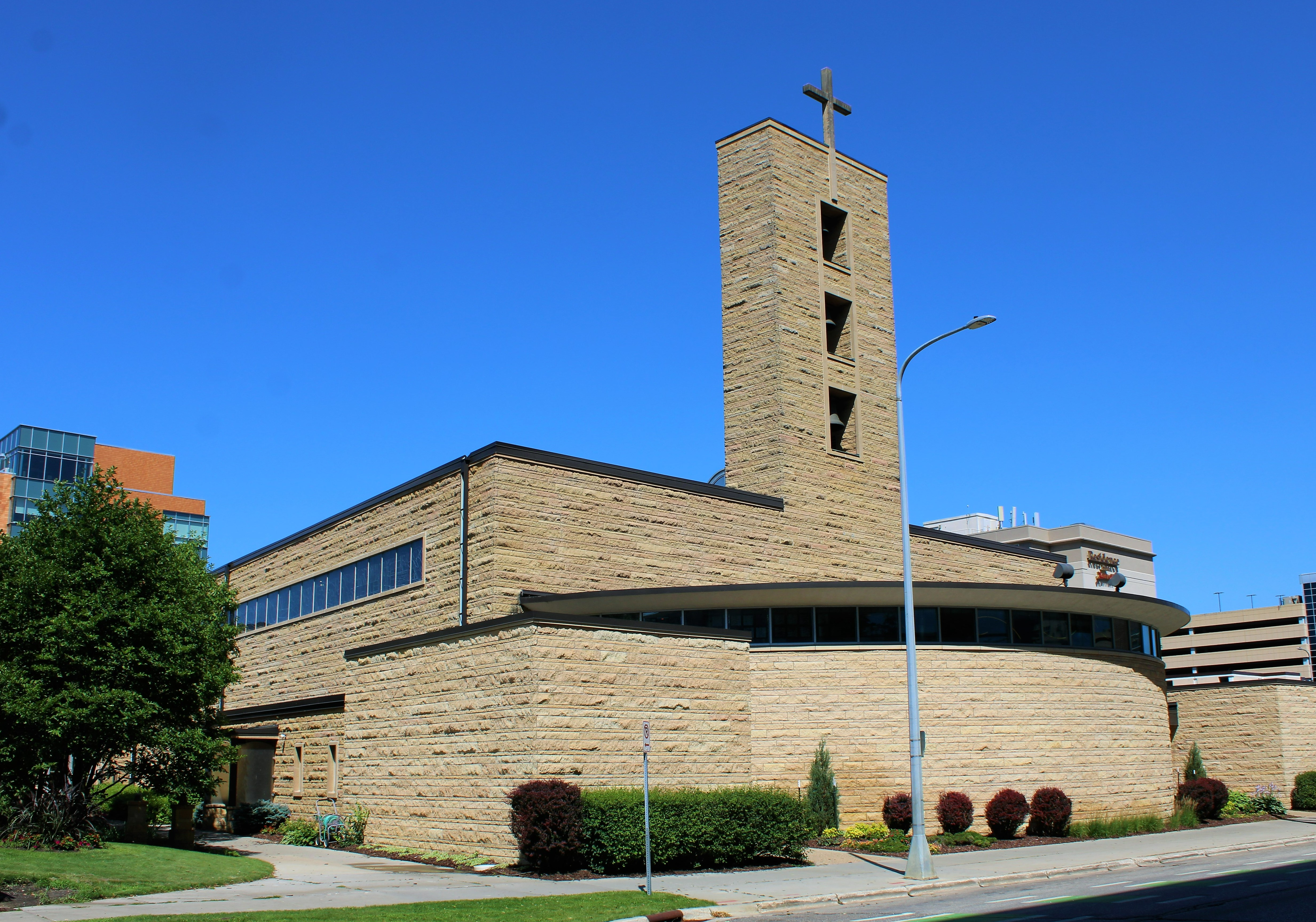
- Cathedral of the Sacred Heart Co-Cathedral of St. John the Evangelist

- Coat of arms

Location
- Country: United States
- Territory: 20 counties across southern Minnesota
- Ecclesiastical province: Saint Paul and Minneapolis

Statistics
- Area: 12,282 sq mi (31,810 km^{2})
- Population: Total; Catholics: (as of 2023); 607,741; 114,255 (18.8%)
- Parishes: 98

Information
- Denomination: Catholic
- Sui iuris church: Latin Church
- Rite: Roman Rite
- Established: November 26, 1889 (136 years ago)
- Cathedral: Cathedral of the Sacred Heart (Winona)
- Co-cathedral: Co-Cathedral of St. John the Evangelist (Rochester)
- Patron saint: Blessed Virgin Mary

Current leadership
- Pope: Leo XIV
- Bishop: Robert Barron
- Metropolitan Archbishop: Bernard Hebda
- Bishops emeritus: John Michael Quinn

Map

Website
- dowr.org

The Diocese of Winona–Rochester (Latin: Dioecesis Vinonaënsis-Roffensis) is a diocese of the Catholic Church in Southern Minnesota in the United States. It is a suffragan diocese in the ecclesiastical province of the metropolitan Archdiocese of Saint Paul and Minneapolis. The mother church is the Cathedral of the Sacred Heart in Winona, with the Co-Cathedral of St. John the Evangelist located in Rochester.

== Territory ==
The Diocese of Winona–Rochester includes the following twenty counties: Blue Earth, Cottonwood, Dodge, Faribault, Fillmore, Freeborn, Houston, Jackson, Martin, Mower, Murray, Nobles, Olmsted, Pipestone, Rock, Steele, Wabasha, Waseca, Watonwan, and Winona.

Within Minnesota, the diocese is bordered to the north by the Archdiocese of Saint Paul and Minneapolis and the Diocese of New Ulm.

== History ==
=== 1826 to 1889 ===
Southern Minnesota area went through several Catholic jurisdictions before the Vatican erected the Diocese of Winona:

- Diocese of Saint Louis (1826 to 1837)
- Diocese of Dubuque (1837 to 1850)
- Diocese of Saint Paul (1850 to 1875)

The first Mass in the present-day diocese was celebrated in 1840 by Lucien Galtier along the Mississippi River in Wabasha. As large numbers of Catholic Irish, German, Czech and Polish immigrants started settling in the region, the diocese sent more missionary priests to minister to them.

In Mankato, the first parish, Saint Peter and Paul, was organized in 1854. The first parish in Winona, St. Thomas, was established in 1857. In 1863, the first Catholic church in Rochester, St. John the Evangelist, was opened. In 1877, Coadjutor Bishop John Ireland of Saint Paul purchased over 100,000 acres (40,000 ha) of land in the Winona area. Ireland then recruited poor Catholic Irish and German farmers to buy the land and settle there, giving them favorable repayment terms.

In 1882, the Sisters of Saint Francis built a new hospital in Rochester and asked Doctors William James Mayo and Charles Mayo to be the medical staff. This was the start of the Mayo Clinic.

=== 1889 to 1928 ===
Pope Leo XIII erected the Diocese of Winona on November 26, 1889. He appointed Joseph Cotter from Saint Paul as the first bishop of Winona. When Cotter became bishop, the new diocese included 45 priests, eight churches, 15 parochial schools, and two hospitals. Approximately 38,000 Catholics resided in the diocese. Cotter died in 1909. By the time of his death, the diocese had a Catholic population of over 49,000 with 91 priests, 116 churches, and 29 parochial schools with 4,700 students.

In 1910, Patrick Heffron of St. Paul was made bishop of Winona. He presided at the opening ceremonies of Cotter High School in Winona in 1911. He also founded St. Mary's College, a men's college in Winona, in 1912. It is today St Mary's University of Minnesota.

In 1915, Heffron was shot twice by Laurence M. Lesches while celebrating a private mass. Heffron survived the shooting; Lesches was committed to a mental hospital for life. Heffron died in 1927.

=== 1928 to 1987 ===
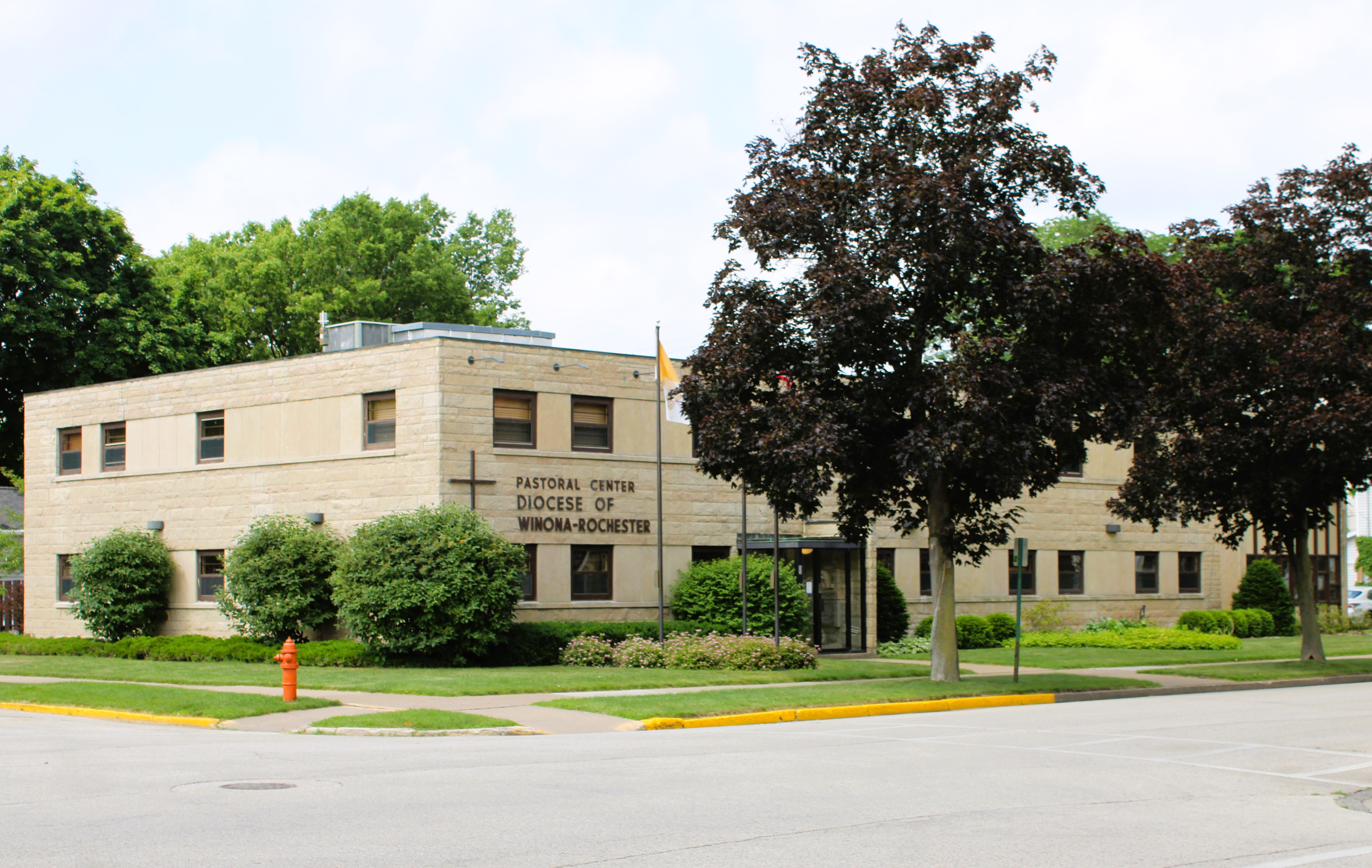
Diocesan pastoral center, Winona, Minnesota (2024)

Auxiliary Bishop Francis Kelly of Winona became the next bishop in 1928. After 21 years as bishop, Kelley retired in 1949. Pope Pius XII then appointed Auxiliary Bishop Edward Fitzgerald of Dubuque to replace him. Fitzgerald oversaw construction of the Cathedral of the Sacred Heart, a seminary, and several churches in the diocese. He attended the four sessions of the Second Vatican Council between 1962 and 1965, and subsequently began implementing the council's reforms in the diocese.

After Fitzgerald retired in 1969, Auxiliary Bishop Loras Watters of Dubuque was made the next bishop of Winona. He promulgated the document "The Church in the Diocese of Winona," which described the local church and the roles of the clergy, religious, and the laity. He initiated the pastoral council, which provided a pastoral leadership role for the laity. Watters retired in 1986.

=== 1987 to 2010 ===
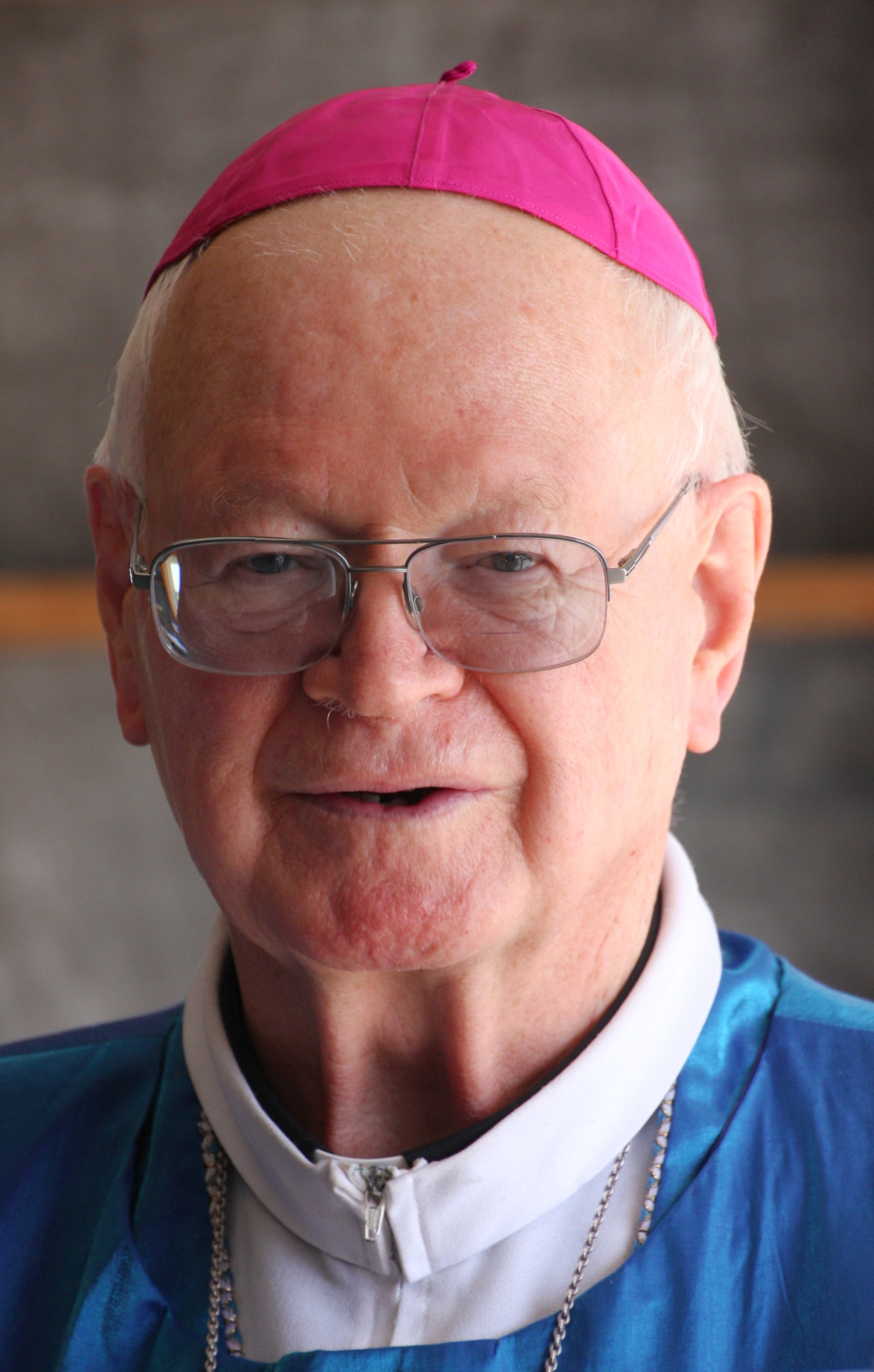
Bishop Harrington (2017)

Auxiliary Bishop John Vlazny from the Archdiocese of Chicago succeeded Watters in 1987. In 1994, Vlazny asked Catholics in the diocese to consider ending gambling as a source of revenue for parishes and schools. Vlazny became archbishop of the Archdiocese of Portland in Oregon in 1997.

The next bishop of Winona was Auxiliary Bishop Bernard Harrington from the Archdiocese of Detroit, appointed by John Paul II in 1997. In 2008, Harrington commented on the plans of Kathy Redig, a Catholic woman in the diocese, to undergo a simulated priestly ordination. Harrington said that Redig would, in effect, be "self-excommunicating" herself from the Catholic Church by this action. That same year Auxiliary Bishop John M. Quinn of the Archdiocese of Detroit was named coadjutor bishop in Winona.

=== 2010 to present ===
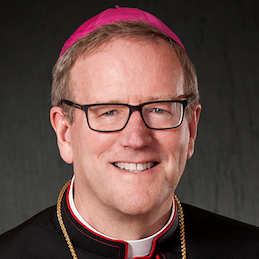
Bishop Barron (2018)

When Harrington retired later in 2008, Quinn succeeded him as bishop. In March 2018, the Vatican renamed the Diocese of Winona as the Diocese of Winona–Rochester. In December 2018, the diocese filed for Chapter 11 Bankruptcy due to the financial burden caused by the 121 sex abuse lawsuits involving the diocese and fourteen priests. As part of its bankruptcy filing, the diocese agreed to not file objections to more plaintiffs being added to the lawsuits up to April 8, 2019. Quinn retired in 2022.

As of 2023, the current bishop of Winona–Rochester is Robert Barron, formerly an auxiliary bishop of the Archdiocese of Los Angeles. He was appointed by Pope Francis in 2022. In November 2022, Barron announced that the diocese was moving its headquarters from Winona to Rochester and was building a new pastoral center there.

=== Sex abuse cases ===
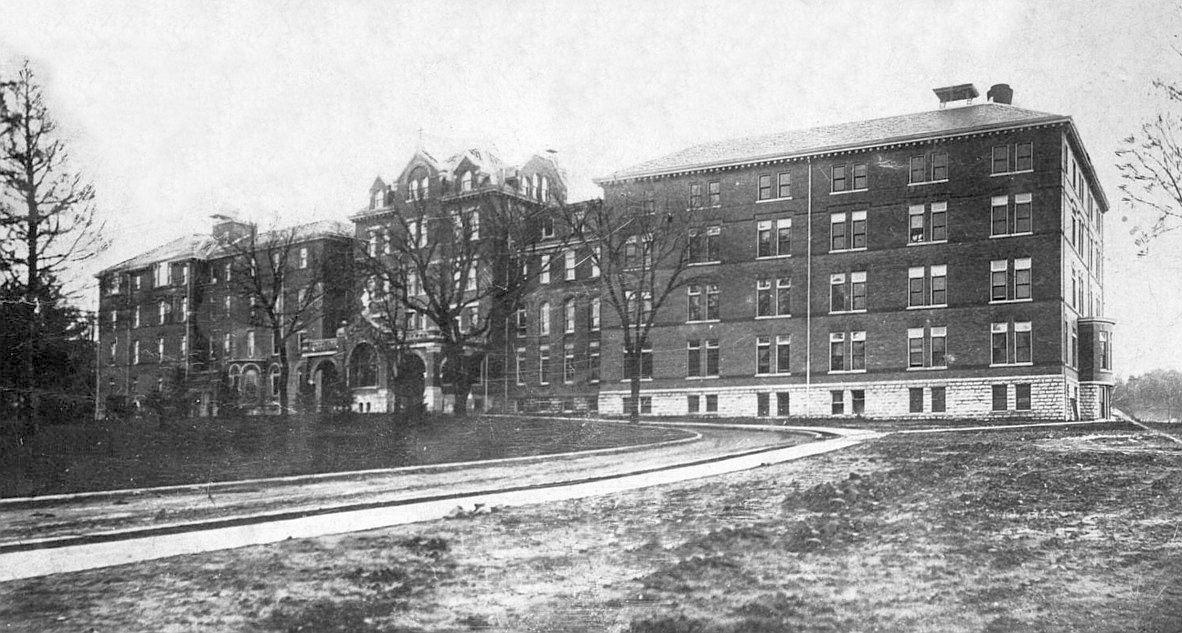
St. Mary's Hospital, Rochester, Minnesota (1910), predecessor of the Mayo Clinic

In 1984, court documents revealed that Thomas Adamson had been accused of sexual misconduct ten years earlier. In response, Bishop Watters had sent the priest to a private psychiatric hospital in Connecticut without contacting the police. When Adamson finished treatment, Archbishop John Roach of Saint Paul-Minneapolis allowed him in 1976 to transfer to the archdiocese. By 1984, the archdiocese was being sued by a local couple who claimed that Adamson had sexually abused their son, Gregory Riedle. Adamson confessed his crimes in 2014, but was never prosecuted due to the statute of limitations.

The diocese in 2013 published a list of fourteen priests credibly accused of sexual abuse of minors. In September 2018, the Minnesota Court of Appeals dismissed an appeal from the diocese to block lawsuits for past cases of sex abuse. In February 2021, the diocese reached a $21.5 million financial settlement with 145 victims of sexual abuse by diocesan clergy as a part of its 2018 bankruptcy filing.

In 2022, police arrested Ubaldo Roque Huerta of Rushmore on charges of criminal sexual conduct. The priest had been drinking with a friend at Huerta's house when he sexually abused them. The diocese commented that it had suspended Huerta from ministry in three years prior, in 2019, and had petitioned the Vatican to laicize him.

== Bishops ==
=== Bishops of Winona ===
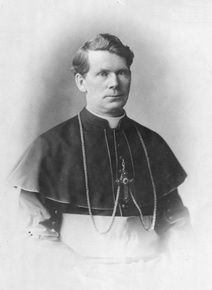
Bishop Heffron (pre-1927)

1. Joseph Bernard Cotter (1889–1909)
2. Patrick Richard Heffron (1910–1927)
3. Francis Martin Kelly (1928–1949)
4. Edward Aloysius Fitzgerald (1949–1969)
5. Loras Joseph Watters (1969–1986)
6. John George Vlazny (1987–1997), appointed Archbishop of Portland in Oregon
7. Bernard Joseph Harrington (1998–2009)
8. John M. Quinn (2009–2018), second see added in Rochester, name of diocese changed to Winona–Rochester

=== Bishops of Winona–Rochester ===
1. John M. Quinn (2018–2022)
2. Robert E. Barron (2022–present)

=== Coadjutor bishop ===
- Leo Binz (1942–1949), appointed coadjutor archbishop and Archbishop of Dubuque and later Archbishop of Saint Paul and Minneapolis

=== Auxiliary bishop ===
- George Henry Speltz (1963–1966), appointed coadjutor bishop and later Bishop of Saint Cloud

=== Other diocesan priests who became bishops ===
- Robert Henry Brom, appointed Bishop of Duluth in 1983 and later Bishop of San Diego
- Frederick William Freking, appointed Bishop of Salina in 1957 and later Bishop of La Crosse
- Michael Joseph Hoeppner, appointed Bishop of Crookston in 2007
- John Hubert Peschges, appointed Bishop of Crookston in 1938

== Education ==
=== Superintendents of schools ===
Name	Tenure
George Henry Speltz	1945–1949
Thomas Adamson	1963–1964
James David Habiger	1964–1980
Joseph Marie Kasel	1976–1982
Dominic J. Kennedy	1984–1988
Marsha Stenzel	2011–2015; 2022–present

=== High schools ===
- Cotter High School – Winona
- Lourdes High School – Rochester
- Loyola Catholic School – Mankato
- Pacelli High School – Austin

=== College ===
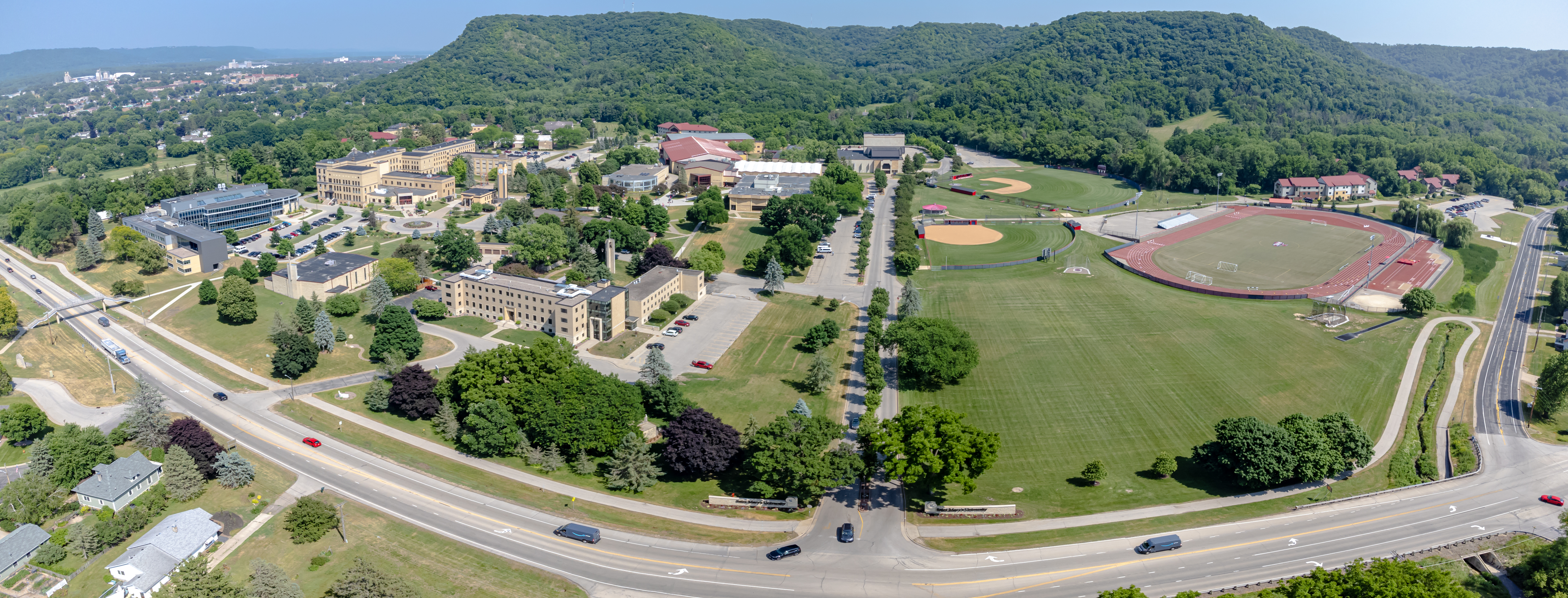
St. Mary's University of Minnesota, Winona, Minnesota (2023)

St. Mary's University of Minnesota– Winona

=== Seminaries ===
Immaculate Heart of Mary Seminary – Winona

== Arms ==
Coat of arms of Diocese of Winona–Rochester
Notes Arms was designed and adopted when the diocese was erected Adopted 1889 Escutcheon The arms of the diocese are composed of a rose on a diamond, supported by a cross Symbolism The Indian name "Winona" can be translated "fairest daughter of the tribe" – a name which for Catholics describes Mary. Her "mystical rose" thus appears on a diamond (symbol of virgins), supported by the cross.
