= Grace Ping =

American long-distance runner (born 2003)

Personal information
- Nationality: American
- Born: July 7, 2003 (age 23)
- Education: Cotter High School; Desert Vista High School; Oklahoma State University
- Height: 5 ft 9 in (175 cm)

Achievements and titles
- Personal bests: All per athlete's World Athletics profile.: 3000 m: 9:35.52i (Fayetteville 2025); 2 miles: 10:28.66 (Greensboro 2016); 5000 m: 16:25.63 (Portland 2017); 10,000 m: 34:17.38 (Palo Alto 2025)

Grace Ping (born July 7, 2003) is an American long-distance runner. Between the ages of 11 and 13, she set six age-group world records between the 2 mile and 5000 meter distances.

As a seventh grader in 2015, Ping won a Minnesota high school cross-country invitational meet and "became a sort of folk hero" from this.

== Career ==
As a seventh grader, Ping was allowed to compete for Cotter High School in her hometown of Winona, Minnesota. In 2015, she won a Minnesota high school cross-country invitational meet in a time of 18:12.47 for the 5 kilometer distance.

In 2016, at the New Balance High School Nationals, she set the girls' age-12 world record in the 5000 meters and two mile distances, with times of 16:44.80 and 10:28.66 respectively. In the 5000 meters, she finished second behind a 19-year-old Weini Kelati. Later that year, her family temporarily moved to Utah, returning to Minnesota afterwards.

In March 2017, at the San Francisco State Distance Carnival, Ping won the 5000 meters in a time of 16:26.83, setting a new girls' age-13 world record. In June 2017, running against professionals at the Portland Track Festival, Ping improved her girls' age-13 world record in the 5000 meters to 16:25.63.

In 2019, her family moved to Arizona, where Ping and her sister Lauren attended Desert Vista High School. They led the high school team to an Arizona state championship that year. In December 2019, due to an injury, Ping placed 30th in the Foot Locker Cross Country Championship, and 27th in the Nike Cross Nationals.

In November 2020, Grace and Lauren led the Desert Vista High School to a second Arizona state cross country championship and, by virtual race, to win the Nike-sponsored national championship. The Desert Vista head coach was their mother Megan, with their father Ryan as an assistant coach. In December 2020, Ping committed to attend Oklahoma State University.

Since 2025, Ping is a graduate student at Duke University.
