= Cotter High School (Winona, Minnesota) =

Private school in Minnesota, United States

Cotter Schools

Location
- 1115 West Broadway Street; Winona, (Winona County), Minnesota 55987; United States
- 44°3′11″N 91°39′59″W

Information
- Type: Private, Coeducational
- Religious affiliation: Roman Catholic
- Established: 1911
- Founder: Bishop Patrick Heffron
- President: Mary Eileen Fitch
- Principal: Dave Forney
- Teaching staff: 32
- Grades: Preschool–12
- Enrollment: 414 (2023)
  - Grade 7: 60
  - Grade 8: 80
  - Grade 9: 75
  - Grade 10: 67
  - Grade 11: 57
  - Grade 12: 75
- Student to teacher ratio: 13:1
- Colors: Royal Blue and White
- Slogan: "Veritatem Vereantur" (Let Them Respect the Truth)
- Fight song: Illinois Loyalty
- Athletics conference: Three Rivers Conference
- Mascot: Rowdy
- Team name: Ramblers
- Rival: Rochester Lourdes High School, Caledonia High School
- Accreditation: North Central Association of Colleges and Schools
- Website: http://www.cotterschools.org/

Cotter Schools is located in Winona, Minnesota, and is the sole Roman Catholic school in the city. Educational opportunities begin as early as 6 weeks old and continue through Grade 12. Boarding is available for students in grades 7–12. The school opened its doors on September 5, 1911, as the "Cotter School for Boys" with 11 students. Cotter, named for the diocese's first bishop, Bishop Joseph Bernard Cotter, was a boys school directed by the Christian Brothers of Saint John Baptist de La Salle. In 1952, the Brothers turned the operation of the school over to the diocese and Cotter became co-educational with the combining of the Cathedral Girls High School. In 1953 a new Cotter building was erected and in 1962 an addition was added. In 1992, with help from an endowment from the Hiawatha Education Foundation, the school moved to its current location on the campus of the former College of Saint Teresa, allowing it to add a boarding school component.

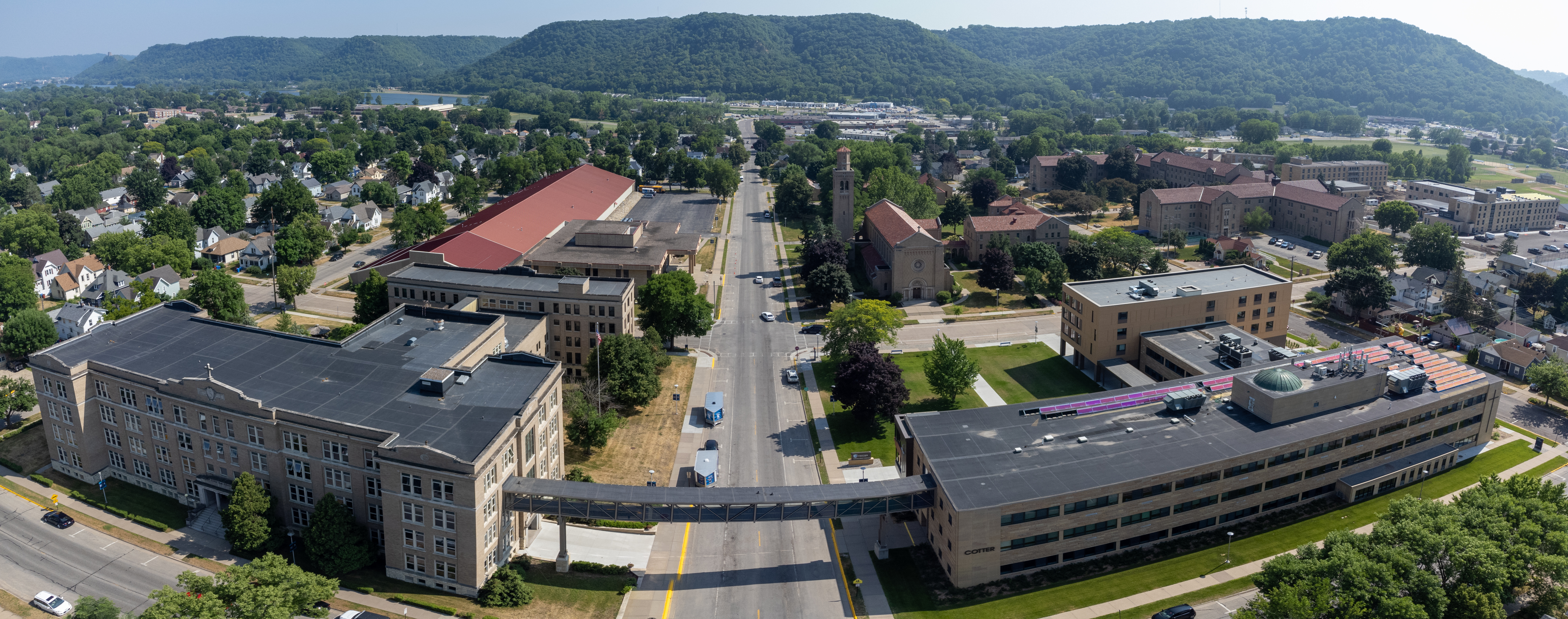
Cotter High School in Winona

== Cotter Family ==
The term "Cotter Family" refers to all the students, teachers, parents, administrators, alumni, volunteers and church members affiliated with the school. Many of these members are in several groups. Roughly 50% of the faculty are alumni. Roughly 25-50%, depending on the year, of the student body are children of alumni, some third and fourth generations. In 1993, local businessmen, headed by Bob Kierlin of Fastenal, started an endowment fund of several million dollars granting the school a technological make-over and allowing it to move to the Saint Teresa campus.

== 2021 Expansion ==
On July 1, 2021, Cotter Schools began offering educational opportunities for students from ages 16 months through 12th grade. In 2023 Cotter relocated the elementary school from St. Stans to the brand new St Lukes Elementary serving grades K-6 on the St Teresa Campus, putting grades K-12 on one campus.

Campuses include:

- Main Square Campus: Montessori 16 months – 6 years
- St. Mary's Campus: 6 months – Kindergarten
- St. Teresa's Campus K-12 Includes the following Buildings
- St. Lukes Elementary: Grades K-6
- St. Teresa's Hall : Grades 7–8
- St. Joseph Hall : Grades 9–12

== Notable alumni ==
- Mike Leaf (class of 1979) – College basketball coach at Winona State University.
- Grace Ping (class of 2020) – Runner at Oklahoma State University.
