= Joseph Bernard Cotter =

American prelate

His Excellency, The Right Reverend Joseph Bernard Cotter
- Bishop of Winona
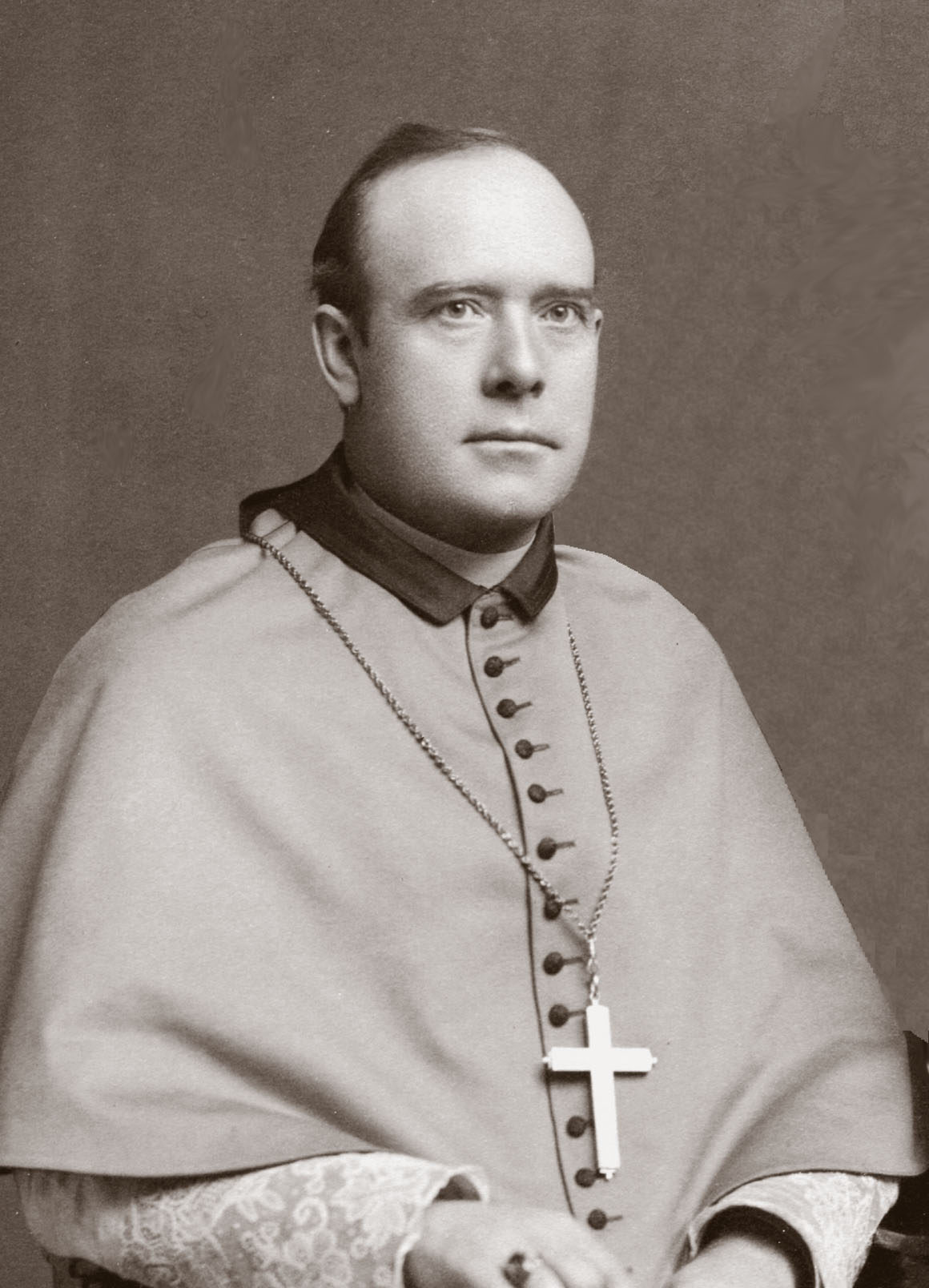
- See: Diocese of Winona
- Appointed: November 15, 1889
- Successor: Patrick Richard Heffron

Orders
- Ordination: May 21, 1870 by Thomas Grace
- Consecration: December 27, 1889 by John Ireland

Personal details
- Born: November 19, 1844 Liverpool, England
- Died: June 27, 1909 (aged 64) Winona, Minnesota, United States
- Education: St. Francis de Sales Seminary; St. Vincent College; St. John's University
- Motto: Fides lux mundo salus patriae (Faith is the light of the world, the salvation of the country)

Joseph Bernard Cotter (November 19, 1844 – June 27, 1909) was an English-born prelate of the Roman Catholic Church. He served as the first bishop of the new Diocese of Winona in Minnesota from 1889 to 1909.

== Biography ==
=== Early life ===
Joseph Cotter was born on November 19, 1844, in Liverpool, England, the son of Lawrence Cotter and Ann (Perrin) Cotter. His father was a native of Ross Castle, County Kerry, in Ireland. His mother was born in Liverpool. In 1849, the Cotter family immigrated to the United States, settling for a short time in New York. They later moved to Cleveland, Ohio. Ann Cotter died during their residence in Cleveland. In 1855, Lawrence Cotter moved the family to St. Paul, Minnesota.

Cotter received his elementary education at private academies in Cleveland and Fremont, Ohio. Bishop Thomas Grace decided to sponsor Cotter's preparation for the priesthood, sending him to St. Francis de Sales Seminary in St. Francis, Wisconsin, in September 1864. The following year, Cotter was sent to St. Vincent College in Latrobe, Pennsylvania, for three years of study.

In 1868, the archdiocese sent Cotter to study was recalled to Minnesota and became a student of theology in St. John's University in Collegeville, Minnesota. In the cathedral, on May 3, 1871, Bishop Grace conferred on him the minor orders. On Sunday, May 7, he received sub-deaconship.

=== Priesthood ===
On May 21, 1871, Cotter was ordained to the priesthood for the Diocese of St. Paul in St. Paul, Minnesota, by Bishop Grace.Cotter celebrated his first mass on the feast of Pentecost at St. Mary Parish in Minneapolis.

=== Bishop of Winona ===
On November 15, 1889, Pope Leo XIII appointed Cotter the first bishop of the new Diocese of Winona. On December 27, 1889, he was consecrated at the Cathedral of Saint Paul in St. Paul by Archbishop John Ireland. In his sermon, Ireland drew upon the meaning of the Dakota word Winona, "eldest daughter", referring to the city as the first-born daughter of what was now the Archdiocese of St. Paul.

Cotter's appearances in the diocese often turned into public celebrations, honoring his elevation to bishop. When he traveled to Wabasha, Minnesota, for a confirmation class, he was greeted by a crowd at the station and a parade of over 800 people accompanied him to the church for the service. A week later, he visited Rochester, Minnesota, and spent much of the day with area clergy. He visited the academy, the new hospital, and the mental hospital. In the evening, the bishop and his clergy were honored by the school children of Rochester. He thanked the children for the lesson their program gave him and remarked that he was not surprised to find so much culture in Rochester, calling the city one of the gems in the crown of the diocese.

In the next few months, Cotter traveled throughout southern Minnesota, greeting the people in his new diocese. His travels took him across the state from the Mississippi River to the South Dakota border. When Cotter became bishop, the new diocese included 45 priests, eight churches, 15 parochial schools, and two hospitals. Approximately 38,000 Catholics resided in the diocese.

Cotter was a strong supporter of the national Temperance Movement. He travelled throughout the United States delivering sermons and lectures of on the evils of alcohol consumption. He was said to have received 69,000 pledges from people promising to give up alcohol. He was elected president of the National Union of Father Matthew Societies, a national umbrella temperance group.

By the turn of the century, the Diocese of Winona was securely established and its bishop was recognized as a civic, as well as religious, leader. Both the church and the community had celebrated Cotter's silver jubilee as a priest in 1896 with addresses and receptions. Cotter said that credit for the expansion of the church was due to the priests and lay people who had worked with him.

Before long, Cotter's health, which had been frail since surgery several years earlier, began to fail. Physicians diagnosed a heart condition, but the bishop maintained his heavy schedule of confirmations, dedications, and other official ceremonies. In early 1909, following his physicians' advice, he traveled to Atlantic City, New Jersey, to rest in a milder climate. As his condition worsened, Cotter returned home to Winona, lingering for a few months.

=== Death and legacy ===
On Sunday, June 27, 1909, Cotter died at his home in Winona at age 64. A newspaper editorial mourning Bishop Cotter's death pointed out that "he left behind him a monument...the Diocese of Winona." By the time of his death, the diocese consisted of 90 priests; 135 parishes, missions, or chapels; 30 parochial schools; three hospitals; and an orphanage. In 1909, there were approximately 49,000 Catholics in the diocese.

Almost 30 years after Cotter's death, Reverend John Sherman of Winona wrote,

"His memory lives in the respect and affection of a devoted people... He was a genuine ambassador of Christ and the good he did lives after him."

Cotter High School in Winona was named in his memory.

== Episcopal succession ==
Catholic Church titles
Preceded by new	Bishop of Winona; 1889–1909	Succeeded by Patrick Richard Heffron
