= Edward Aloysius Fitzgerald =

Roman Catholic bishop (1893–1972)

His Excellency, The Most Reverend Edward Aloysius Fitzgerald DD, LLD
- Bishop of Winona; Titular Bishop of Cantanus
- Church: Catholic Church
- See: Diocese of Winona
- Appointed: October 20, 1949
- Term ended: January 8, 1969
- Predecessor: Francis Martin Kelly
- Successor: Loras Joseph Watters
- Previous posts: Auxiliary Bishop of Dubuque (1946 to 1949)

Orders
- Ordination: June 7, 1941 by James Keane
- Consecration: August 26, 1965 by Henry Rohlman

Personal details
- Born: February 13, 1893 Cresco, Iowa, US
- Died: March 30, 1972 (aged 79) Winona, Minnesota, US
- Education: Grand Seminary of Montreal; University of Chicago; University of Minnesota
- Motto: Fiat voluntas tua (Thy will be done)

Edward Aloysius Fitzgerald (February 13, 1893 – March 30, 1972) was an American bishop of the Catholic Church. He served as an auxiliary bishop in the Archdiocese of Dubuque in Iowa from 1946 to 1949, and as the fourth bishop of Winona in Minnesota from 1949 to 1969.

== Biography ==
=== Early life ===
Edward Fitzgerald was born on February 13, 1893, in Cresco, Iowa, to Edward and Emma (née Daly) Fitzgerald. He was educated at Assumption High School in Cresco, then attended St. Joseph College in Dubuque. After graduating from St. Joseph in 1913, Fitzgerald decided to become a priest. Fitzgerald studied at the Grand Seminary of Montreal in Montreal, Quebec, where he earned Bachelor of Sacred Theology and a Bachelor of Canon Law degrees.

=== Priesthood ===
Fitzgerald was ordained a priest in Dubuque for the Archdiocese of Dubuque by Archbishop James Keane on July 25, 1916. He took post-graduate studies at the University of Chicago in Chicago, Illinois, and the University of Minnesota in Minneapolis, Minnesota

Fitzgerald served on the faculty of Loras College in Dubuque for 25 years, also serving as registrar and dean of studies. In 1938, he received an honorary degree from Loyola University Chicago in recognition for his work in organizing Catholic colleges. During his time at Loras, Fitzgerald filled a number of chaplaincies in the Dubuque area. He was appointed a pastor at Sacred Heart Parish in Osage, Iowa, in 1941 and at St. Joseph Parish in Elkader, Iowa, in 1946.

=== Auxiliary Bishop of Dubuque ===
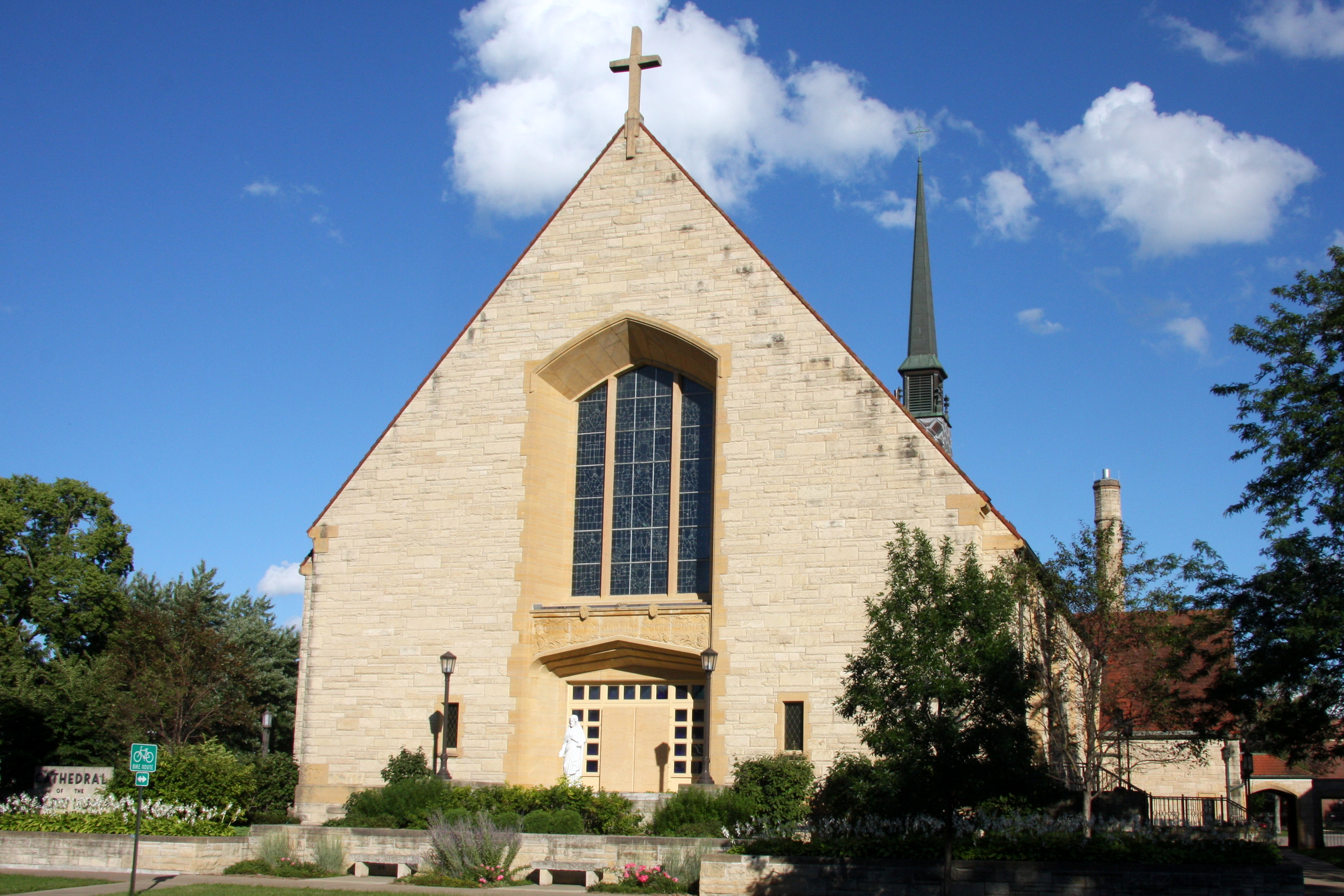
Cathedral of the Sacred Heart, Winona, Minnesota (2014)

On August 3, 1946, Pope Pius XII appointed Fitzgerald as titular bishop of Cantanus and auxiliary bishop of Dubuque. He was consecrated on September 12, 1946, by Archbishop Henry Rohlman in St. Raphael's Cathedral in Dubuque. Bishop Louis Kucera of Lincoln and Coadjutor Bishop Leo Binz of Winona served as the co-consecrators. The sermon was delivered by Archbishop Edward Howard of Portland in Oregon, who was himself a native of Cresco. Fitzgerald was the first auxiliary bishop of the Dubuque archdiocese.

=== Bishop of Winona ===
On October 20, 1949, Pius XII appointed Fitzgerald as bishop of Winona . He became known as "the building bishop" for his oversight of the construction of the Cathedral of the Sacred Heart in Winona a seminary, and several churches in the diocese. He attended all four sessions of the Second Vatican Council in Rome between 1962 and 1965, and subsequently implemented the Council's reforms in the diocese, including introducing English into the mass.

=== Later life and death ===
Fitzgerald retired as bishop of Winona on January 8, 1969. On March 30, 1972, Fitzgerald died in the Cathedral of the Sacred Heart during the Holy Thursday liturgy. He was buried in St. Mary's Cemetery in Winona.

Catholic Church titles
| Preceded by Francis Martin Kelly | Bishop of Winona; 1949–1969 | Succeeded by Loras Joseph Watters |
