= Loras Joseph Watters =

American bishop (1915–2009)

His Excellency, The Most Reverend Loras Joseph Watters Ph.D., DD
- Bishop of Winona; Titular Bishop of Fidoloma
- Church: Roman Catholic Church
- See: Diocese of Winona
- Appointed: January 8, 1969
- Installed: March 13, 1969
- Term ended: October 14, 1986
- Predecessor: Edward Aloysius Fitzgerald
- Successor: John George Vlazny
- Other post: Titular Bishop of Fidoloma
- Previous post: Auxiliary Bishop of Dubuque

Orders
- Ordination: June 7, 1941 by Francis Beckman
- Consecration: August 26, 1965 by Egidio Vagnozzi

Personal details
- Born: October 14, 1915 Dubuque, Iowa, US
- Died: March 30, 2009 (aged 93) Winona, Minnesota, US
- Education: Catholic University of America; Pontifical Gregorian University
- Motto: Dominus Lux Mea (Lord, my light)

Loras Joseph Watters (October 14, 1915 – March 30, 2009) was an American bishop of the Catholic Church. He served as an auxiliary bishop in the Archdiocese of Dubuque in Iowa from 1965 to 1969, and as the fifth bishop of Winona in Minnesota from 1969 to 1986.

== Biography ==
=== Early life ===
Loras Watters was born on October 14, 1915, in Dubuque, Iowa, the son of Martin and Carolyn (Sisler) Watters. He was a sick child at birth; he and his mother spent an extended period of time in the hospital. He received his first name from the sister who baptized him in the hospital, Sr. Loras, "much to his mother's chagrin." Watters received his early education at St. Raphael's Cathedral School in Dubuque and Loras Academy in Dubugue. He completed his undergraduate degree at Columbia College in Dubuque.

Watters resided at the Pontifical North American College in Rome while studying at the Pontifical Gregorian University before World War II closed both institutions. He completed his studies at the Theological College at The Catholic University of America in Washington, D.C.

=== Priesthood ===
Watters was ordained a priest for the Archdiocese of Dubuque on June 7, 1941, by Archbishop Francis Beckman in St. Raphael's Cathedral. He served as the assistant pastor at St. Martin's Parish in Cascade, Iowa, from 1941 to 1944. He then served on the faculty of Loras Academy in Dubuque from 1944 to 1946.

Watters returned to Catholic University for post-graduate work before returning to Loras Academy briefly as principal. He then returned to Catholic University where he earned a doctorate in education. Upon returning to Dubuque he served on the faculty of Loras College in the Education Department from 1954 to 1956.

Watters returned to Rome in 1956 where he served as spiritual director at the Pontifical North American College until 1960. He was named a papal chamberlain by Pope Pius XII and then a domestic prelate by Pope John XXIII during these years. After he returned to Iowa, Watters became the director of the North American Martyrs Retreat House in Cedar Falls.

=== Auxiliary Bishop of Dubuque ===
Watters was appointed titular bishop of Fidoloma and auxiliary bishop of Dubuque by Pope Paul VI on June 21, 1965. He was consecrated a bishop by Archbishop Egidio Vagnozzi on August 26, 1965, in St. Raphael's Cathedral. Archbishop James Byrne and Bishop James Casey were the co-consecrators. Watters attended the fourth session on the Second Vatican Council in Rome. During his time as auxiliary bishop, Waters served as the vicar general of the archdiocese, superintendent of schools for the archdiocese and as pastor of Nativity Parish in Dubuque.

=== Bishop of Winona ===
On January 8, 1969, Paul VI appointed Watters as the fifth bishop of Winona; he was installed on March 13, 1969. Watters led the diocese in the years after Vatican II. He promulgated the document, "The Church in the Diocese of Winona," which described the local Catholic church and the roles of the clergy, religious, and the laity. He initiated the diocesan pastoral council, which provided a pastoral leadership role for the laity in the diocese. From 1972 to 1974, Watters served as chair of the Bishops' Committee on Priestly Formation for the National Conference of Catholic Bishops.

Watters led the diocese in a spiritual renewal program called RENEW beginning in 1984, which encouraged the laity to participate in the life of their parish. This emphasis on the role of lay people helped in the years Watters was the bishop and after he resigned as the number of priests in diocese declined. He also established the diocesan tribunal, the Diocesan Finance Office, and reorganized the diocese into deaneries. During his years as bishop, he resided in a three-room apartment at the diocesan pastoral center.

=== Retirement and legacy ===
Watters remained as bishop of Winona until his retirement on his 71st birthday in 1986. He initially moved to St. Mary's College in Winona where he taught part-time and served as chaplain to the Brothers. He moved briefly to Pacific Grove, California, to be near his sisters before returning to Winona in 2003 and resided at Callista Court at St. Anne's Extended Healthcare.

Loras Watters died in Winona on March 30, 2009, at age 93. His funeral was held in the Cathedral of the Sacred Heart and he was buried in St. Mary's Cemetery in Winona.

== Episcopal succession ==
Catholic Church titles
Preceded by Edward Aloysius Fitzgerald	Bishop of Winona; 1969–1986	Succeeded by John George Vlazny
