= Cathedral of the Sacred Heart (Winona, Minnesota) =

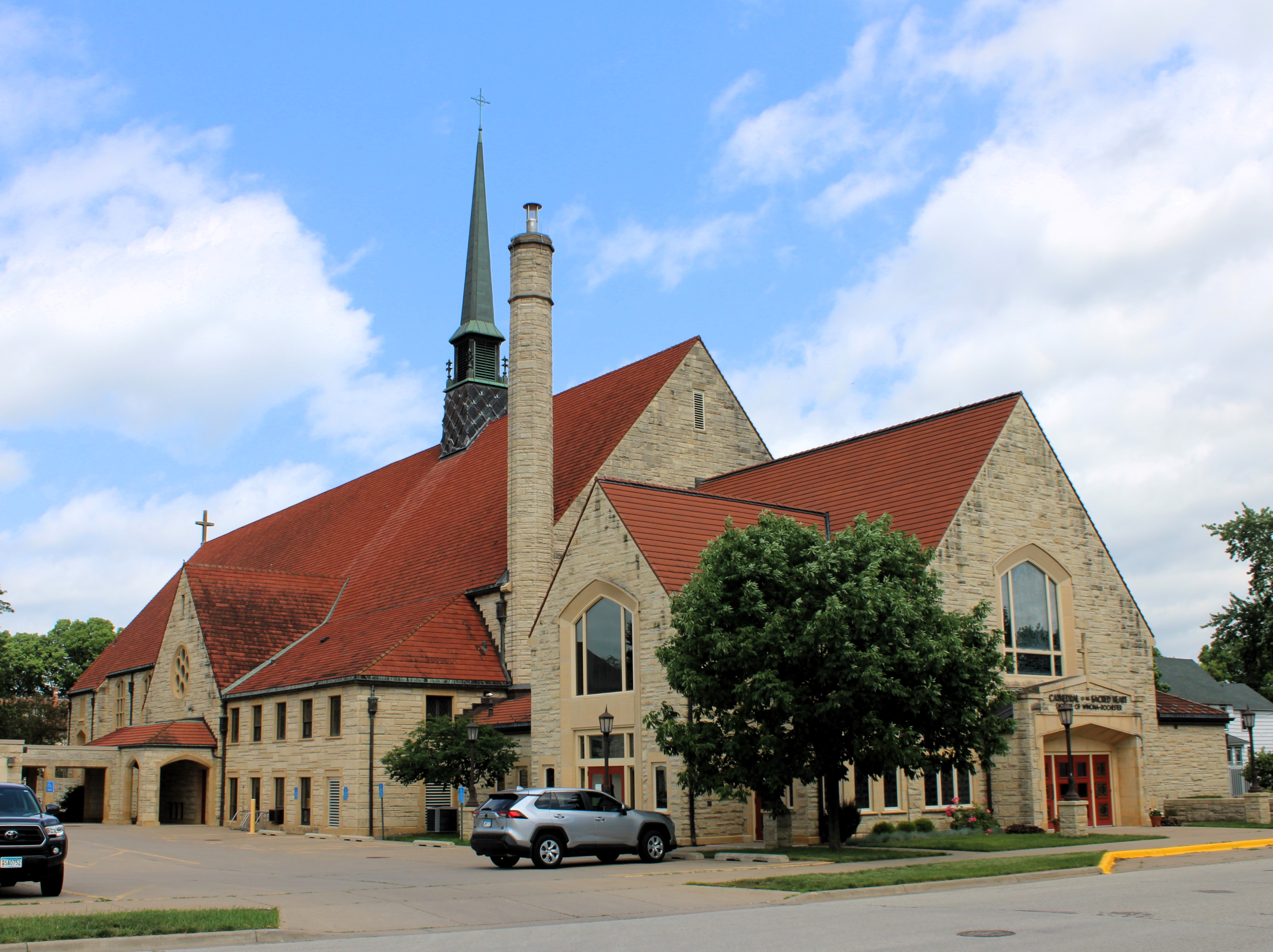
- The cathedral in 2024

- Location within Minnesota Location within the United States
- 44°02′54″N 91°38′22″W
- Location: 360 Main St. Winona, Minnesota
- Country: United States
- Denomination: Roman Catholic
- Website: www.cascwinona.org

History
- Status: Cathedral
- Founded: 1952
- Dedication: Sacred Heart of Jesus

Architecture
- Style: Gothic Revival
- Completed: 1952

Specifications
- Materials: Limestone

Administration
- Diocese: Winona-Rochester

Clergy
- Bishop: Most Rev. Robert Barron
- Rector: Fr. Mark McNea

The Cathedral of the Sacred Heart is the mother church of the Roman Catholic Diocese of Winona-Rochester. The cathedral is located in Winona, Minnesota, United States, on Minnesota State Highway 43 near downtown.

== History ==
Sacred Heart parish was established in 1952. It was a merger between St. Thomas and St. Joseph parishes, whose facilities stood four blocks apart.

The Pro-Cathedral of St. Thomas was established as the city's first parish in 1857. Minnesota's first bishop, the Rt. Rev. Joseph Cretin, had celebrated the first recorded Mass in town the previous year and sent the Rev. Thomas Murray to organize the parish. St. Thomas parish had two church buildings in its history, the second of which was completed in the early 1870s. It became the pro-cathedral when the Diocese of Winona was established in 1889 and its pastor, the Rev. Joseph Cotter, was named the first bishop of Winona.

St. Joseph parish was established in 1862 to serve the spiritual needs of Winona's German Catholics. It also had two church buildings in its history, the second of which was completed in the early 1880s.

As the diocese grew, it was determined that St. Thomas was not an adequate facility for a cathedral. A fund drive to build a new cathedral was initiated in 1944. On June 15, 1950, the Holy See approved the petition to merge the two parishes. At the time of their merger St. Thomas had about 600 households and St. Joseph had more than 300. The parish was established in 1952 when the present cathedral was completed. Sacred Heart and St. Casimir parishes have subsequently been clustered. St. Casimir's was founded in 1905 from St. Stanislaus Kostka parish.

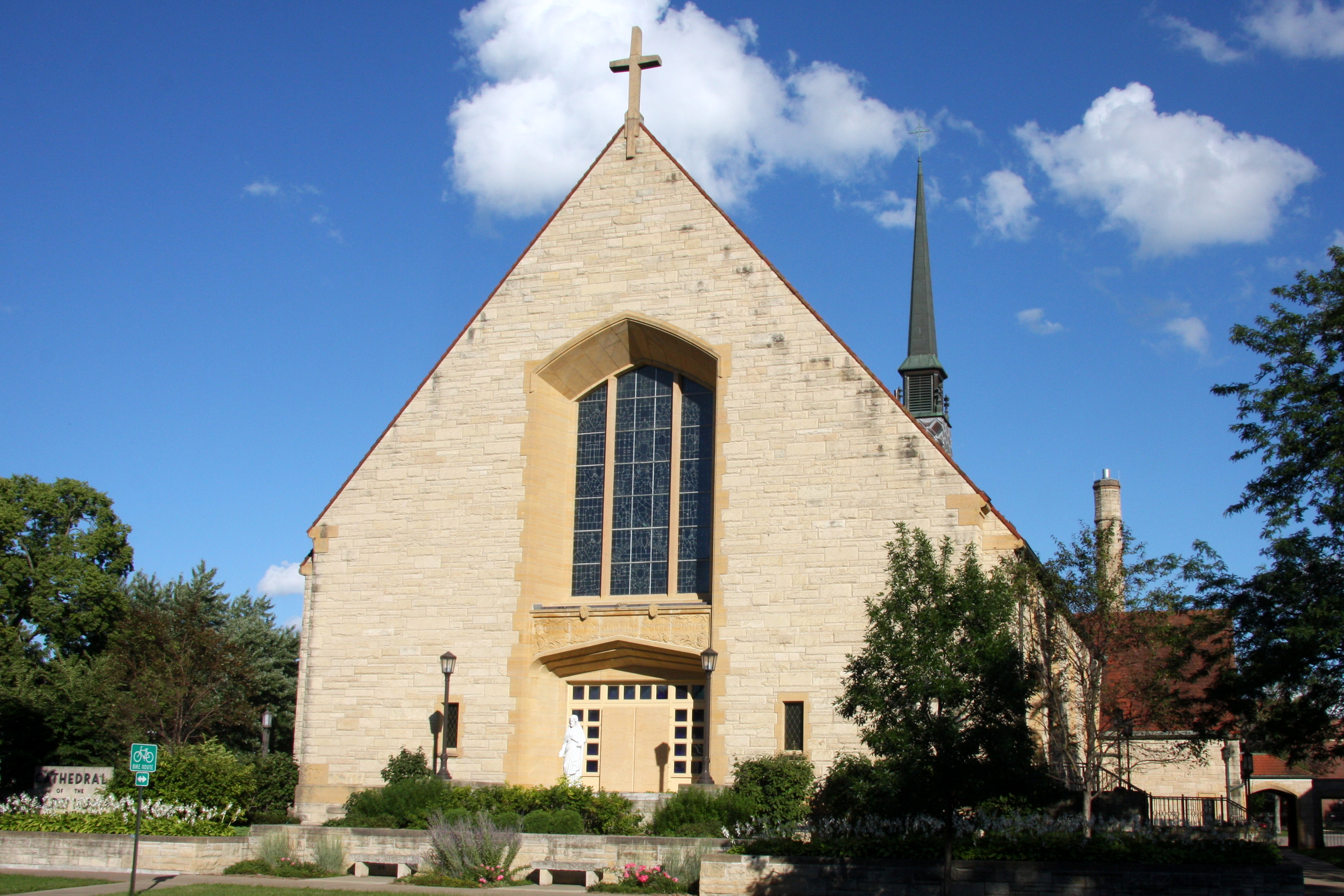
Original main facade

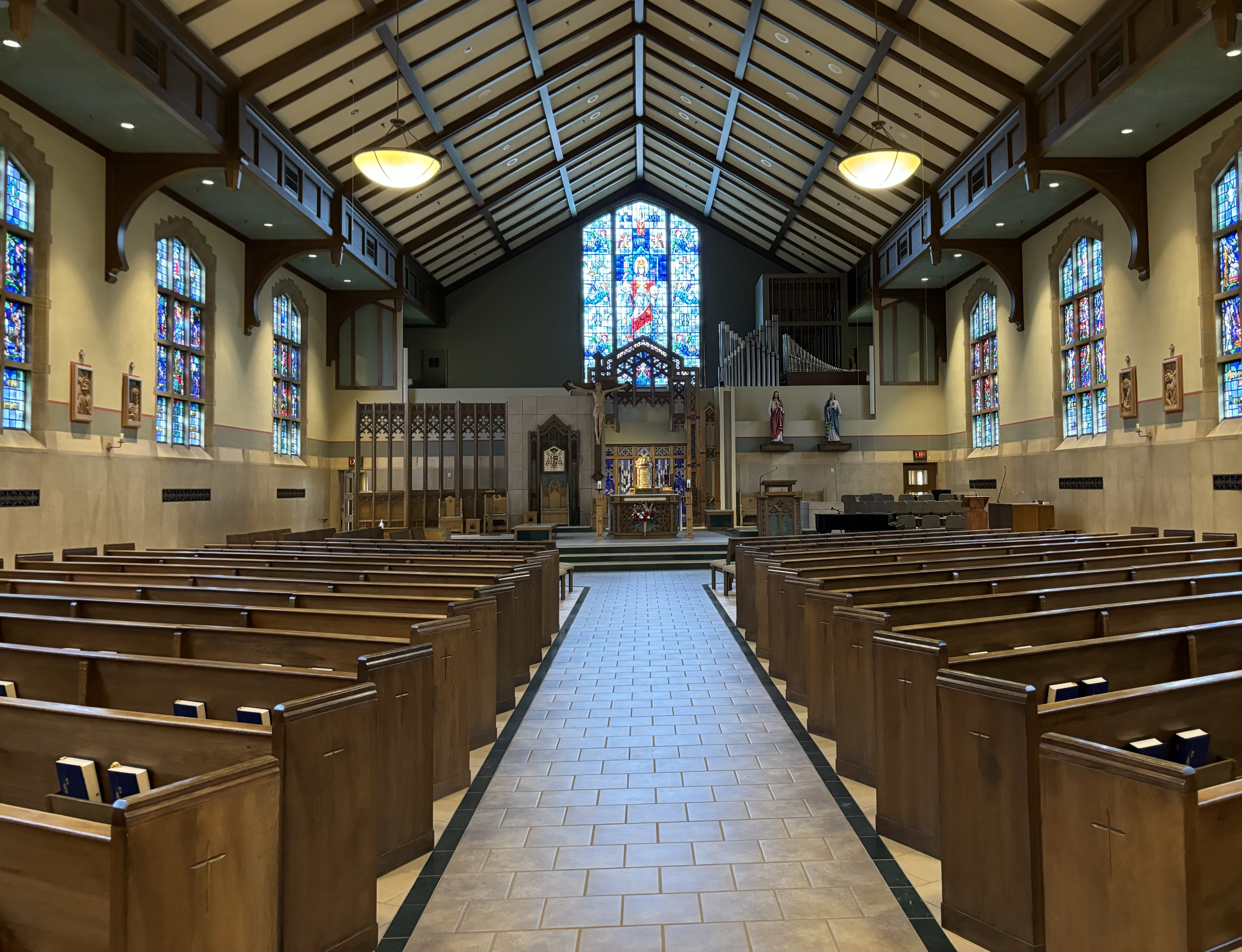
View up the nave toward the altar

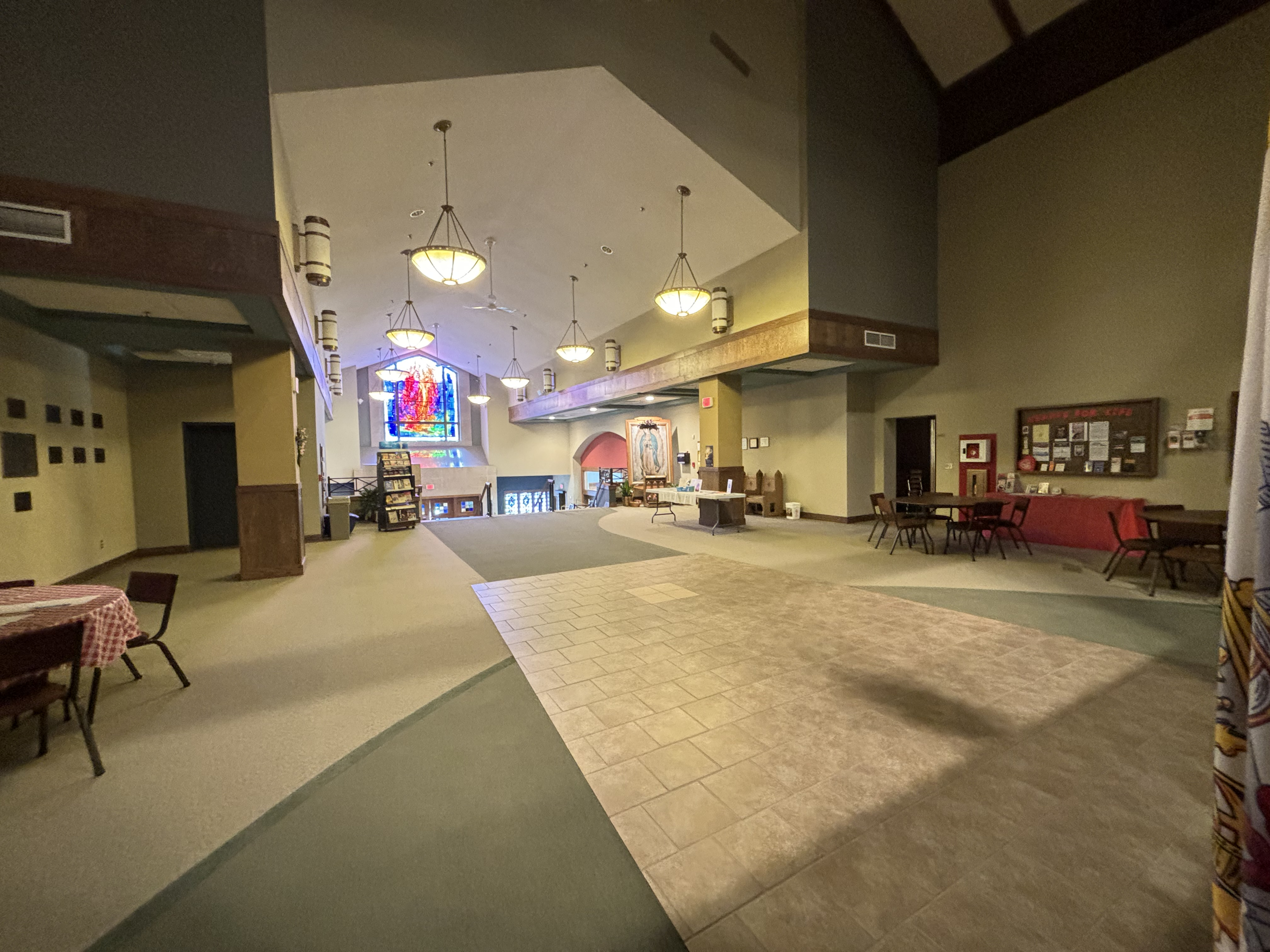
Gathering Space

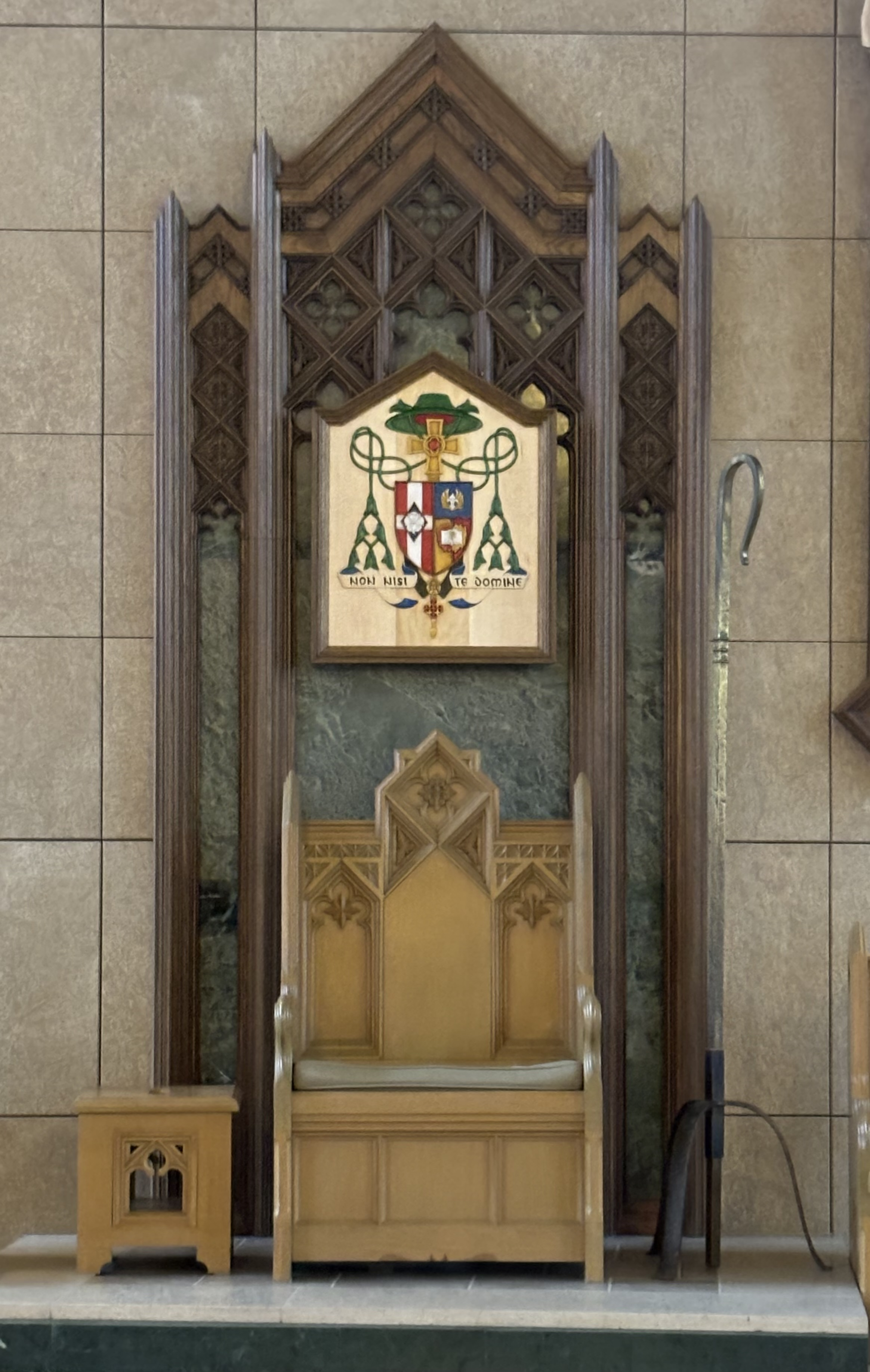
Cathedra

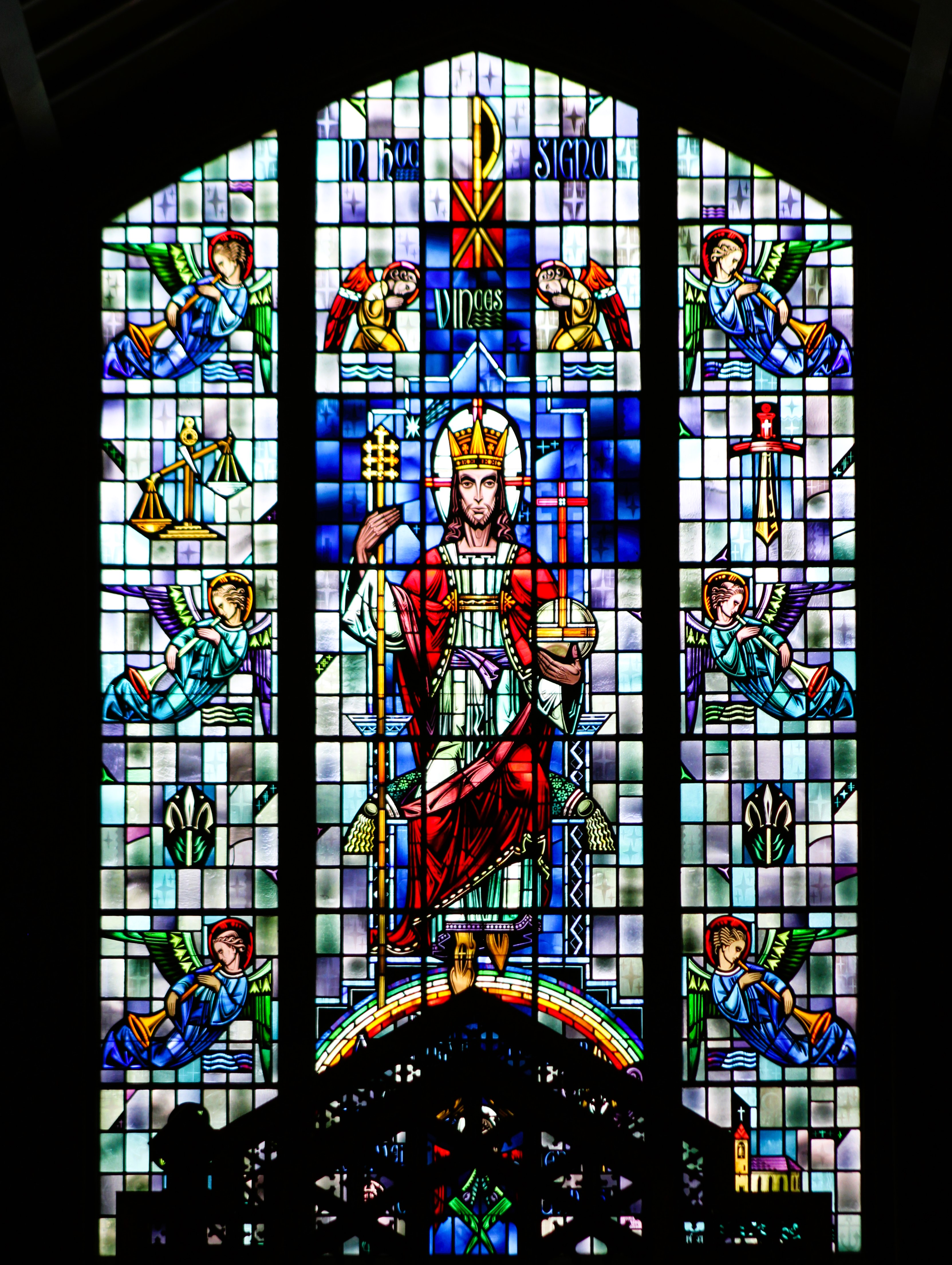
Stained glass window in the gallery

== See also ==
- List of Catholic cathedrals in the United States
- List of cathedrals in the United States
- List of Catholic churches in the United States
