= Robert Barron =

American Catholic prelate, scholar and evangelist (born 1959)

The Most Reverend Robert Barron
- Bishop of Winona–Rochester
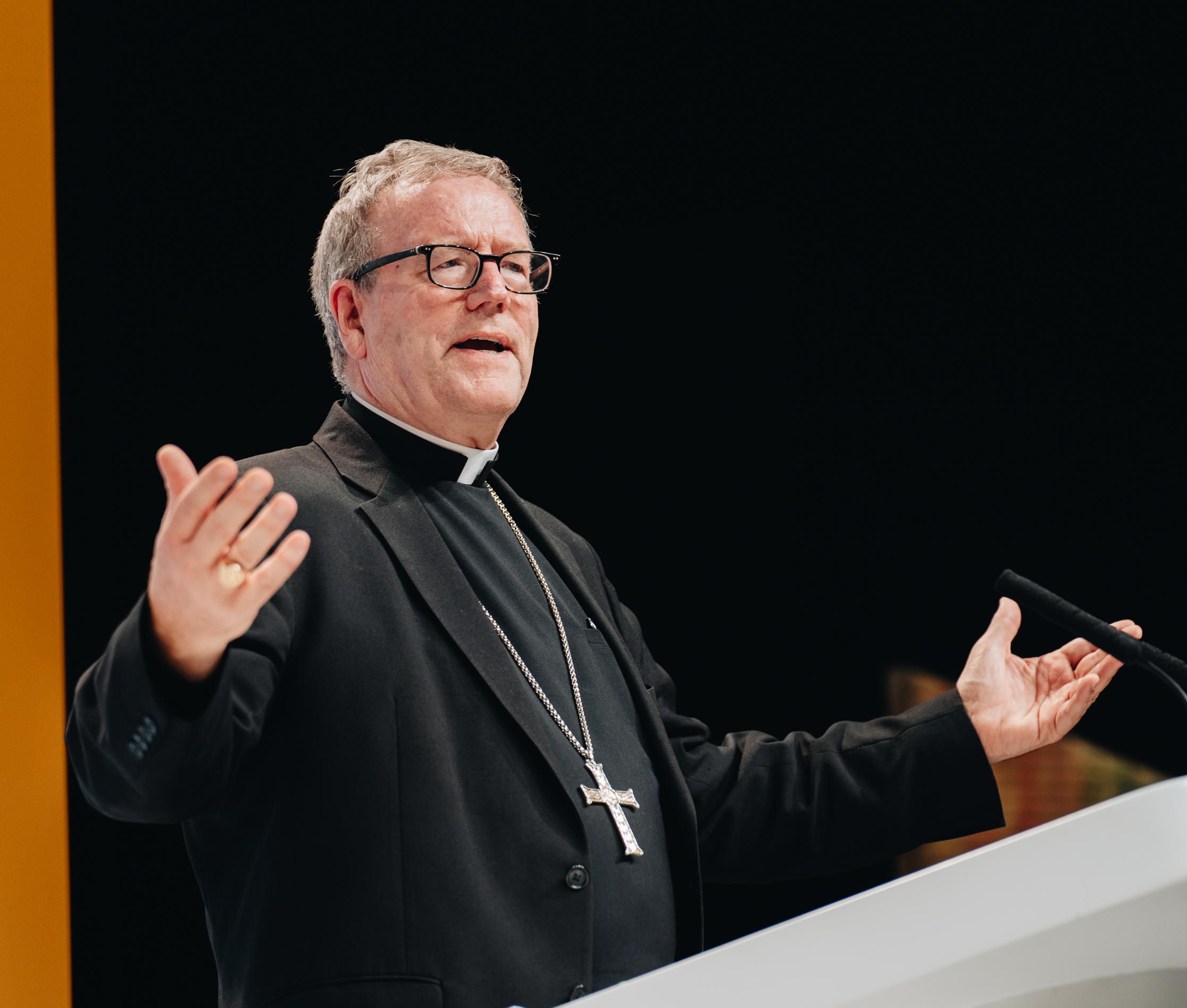
- Barron in 2023
- Church: Catholic
- Diocese: Winona–Rochester
- Appointed: June 2, 2022
- Installed: July 29, 2022
- Predecessor: John M. Quinn
- Previous posts: Auxiliary Bishop of Los Angeles and Titular Bishop of Macriana in Mauretania (2015–2022); President–Rector of University of St. Mary of the Lake/Mundelein Seminary (2012–15)

Orders
- Ordination: May 24, 1986 by Joseph Bernardin
- Consecration: September 8, 2015 by José Horacio Gómez, Blase J. Cupich, and Joseph Martin Sartoris

Personal details
- Born: Robert Emmet Barron; November 19, 1959 (age 67) Chicago, Illinois, U.S.
- Education: Catholic University of America (BA, MA); University of St. Mary of the Lake (STL); Institut Catholique de Paris (STD)
- Motto: Non nisi te Domine (Latin for 'Nothing but you, Lord')
- Awards: List of awards

Philosophical work
- Era: Contemporary philosophy
- Region: Western philosophy
- School: Thomism; Nouvelle theologie Virtue ethics
- Main interests: Systematic theology; Ethics
- Styles
- Reference style: His Excellency; The Most Reverend
- Spoken style: Your Excellency
- Religious style: Bishop

Ordination history
History
Priestly ordination
- Ordained by: Joseph Bernardin
Episcopal consecration
- Principal consecrator: José Horacio Gómez
- Co-consecrators: Blase J. Cupich, Joseph M. Sartoris

Robert Emmet Patrick Barron (born November 19, 1959) is an American Catholic theologian who has served as bishop of the Diocese of Winona–Rochester since 2022. He served as rector at Mundelein Seminary from 2012 to 2015 and as auxiliary bishop for the Archdiocese of Los Angeles from 2015 to 2022. He has published on theology and spirituality, and is the founder of Word on Fire.

Barron was the host of Catholicism, a documentary TV series that aired on PBS. His social media following has earned him the monikers "bishop of Catholic social media" and the "bishop of the Internet". His 2016 film series, Catholicism: The Pivotal Players, was syndicated for national television in the United States.

Barron is a religion correspondent and commentator for NBC and Fox News.

== Life and clerical career ==
=== Early life ===
Robert Emmet Barron was born on November 19, 1959, in Chicago, Illinois. He is of Irish descent. He spent his childhood first in Detroit, then in the Chicago suburb of Western Springs. His mother was a homemaker, and his father, who died in 1987, was a national sales manager for John Sexton & Company, a national food distributor. He has a sister, Pat Callahan, a teacher at Lyons Township High School in the Chicago western suburbs, and a brother, John Barron, who was the Sun-Times Media Group's publisher.

Barron started reading the works of Thomas Aquinas when he was a freshman at Fenwick High School, a private Dominican high school. He transferred to Benet Academy, a private Benedictine high school, where he graduated in 1977.

Barron attended the University of Notre Dame in South Bend, Indiana, for a year before transferring to Mundelein Seminary in Mundelein, Illinois. One year later, he was accepted as a Basselin Scholar at the School of Theology of the Catholic University of America in Washington, D.C., where he earned a Bachelor of Philosophy degree in 1981 and a Master of Philosophy degree in 1982; his master's thesis was on the political philosophy of Karl Marx. Barron earned a Licentiate of Sacred Theology from Mundelein Seminary in 1986.

=== Priesthood ===
Barron was ordained to the priesthood for the Archdiocese of Chicago on May 24, 1986, by Cardinal Joseph Bernardin.

After serving as an associate pastor of St. Paul of the Cross Catholic Parish in Park Ridge, Illinois, from 1986 to 1989, he was sent to France and earned a Doctor of Sacred Theology at the Institut Catholique de Paris in 1992. His dissertation was titled "Creation as Discipleship: A Study of the De potentia of Thomas Aquinas in Light of the Dogmatik of Paul Tillich".

In addition to his native English, Barron is fluent in French, Spanish, German, and Latin. He is a proponent of Hans Urs von Balthasar's "dare we hope" theology, declaring there is "objective ground" for a "hope that all men may be saved".

From 1992 until 2015, Barron was a professor of systematic theology at University of St. Mary of the Lake, where he was also named the inaugural Francis Cardinal George Professor of Faith and Culture in 2008. He also served as president-rector from 2012 to 2015.

Barron lectured extensively in the United States and internationally, including the Pontifical North American College and the Pontifical University of St. Thomas Aquinas in Rome. In 2000, Barron launched Word on Fire Catholic Ministries, a non-profit organization, that supports his evangelistic endeavors. Word on Fire programs, featuring Barron, have been broadcast regularly on WGN America, EWTN, Telecare, Relevant Radio and the Word on Fire YouTube channel. Barron's Word on Fire website offers daily blogs, articles, commentaries and over ten years of weekly sermon podcasts.

In 2002, Barron was a visiting professor at the University of Notre Dame and at the Pontifical University of St. Thomas Aquinas in 2007. He was also twice scholar-in-residence at the Pontifical North American College, in 2007 and 2010.

=== Auxiliary Bishop of Los Angeles ===
Coat of arms as Auxiliary Bishop of Los Angeles

On July 21, 2015, Pope Francis appointed Barron an auxiliary bishop in the Archdiocese of Los Angeles and titular bishop of Macriana in Mauritania. Archbishop José Horacio Gómez noted that Barron's media talent and rapport with young people, as well as his outreach to other faiths would be good for the archdiocese. Archbishop Cupich, of Chicago, said Barron would be of great benefit to the LA archdiocese.

On September 8, 2015, Barron received his episcopal consecration at the Cathedral of Our Lady of the Angels from Archbishop José H. Gomez. That same month, Barron started a weekly podcast called The Word on Fire Show.

=== Bishop of Winona–Rochester ===
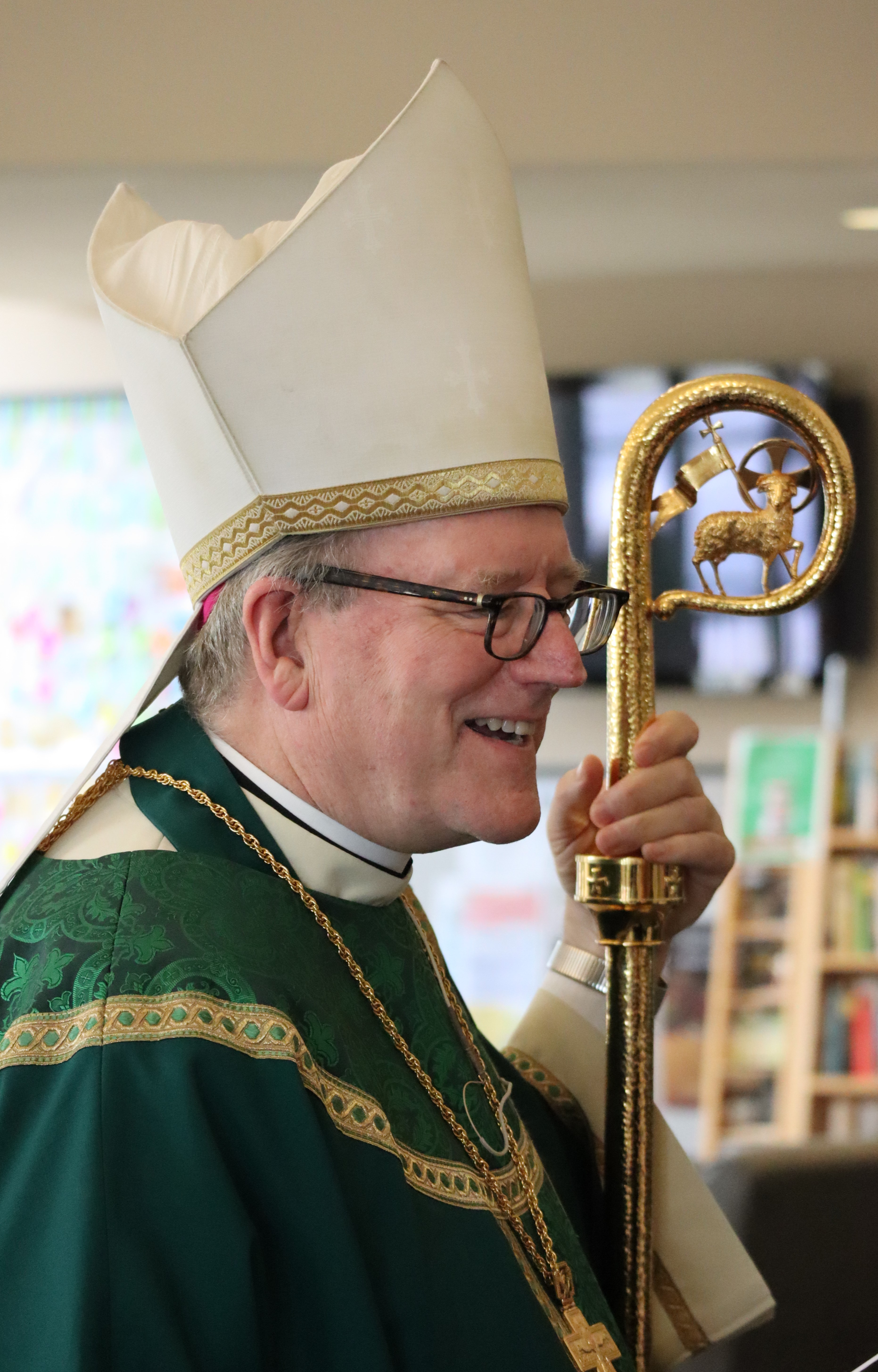
Bishop Barron in Minnesota in 2023

On June 2, 2022, Pope Francis appointed Barron as the ninth bishop of the Diocese of Winona–Rochester, in southern Minnesota. His installation there took place on July 29, 2022, at the Co-Cathedral of St. John the Evangelist in Rochester, Minnesota.

=== Religious Liberty Commission ===
On May 1, 2025, it was announced the Barron would serve on the Trump Administration's newly created Religious Liberty Commission. The commission is tasked with delivering a report on the state of religious liberty in the US. The same day, other members of the panel were announced, including clerics like Cardinal Timothy Dolan.

== Media career ==
Barron lectures extensively in the United States and internationally and he has published numerous books, essays, and DVD programs. He is a frequent commentator for The Chicago Tribune, NBC Nightly News, Fox News Channel, Our Sunday Visitor, the Catholic Herald (London, UK) and The Catholic New World.

=== Internet ===
Barron's website hosts daily blog posts, weekly articles and video commentaries, and an audio archive of over 500 homilies.

=== Videos ===
Barron has produced over 1,000 online video commentaries, which have attracted over 84 million views. His weekly productions include Sunday sermons and brief theological reviews of contemporary culture, including movies, books, music, and current events.

=== Television ===
Barron's videos are aired on CatholicTV, EWTN, Telecare, NET TV, and Salt + Light Television. He created a 10-part documentary, Catholicism, filmed in 16 countries, which aired on public television in the United States beginning in 2011. A sequel was released in September 2013, titled Catholicism: The New Evangelization.

In October 2010, Barron premiered a half-hour television show, Word on Fire with Father Barron, on WGN America on Sundays. Barron is the first priest since Archbishop Fulton Sheen in the 1950s to have a regular national program on a commercial television network.

=== Radio/podcast ===
Barron produces a weekly podcast on faith and culture titled The Word on Fire Show. His weekly homilies and podcasts air on radio stations around the United States.

Barron has appeared on other podcasts, including those of Jordan Peterson, Lex Fridman, Ben Shapiro, Michael Knowles, Theo Von, and Tucker Carlson.

== Presentations ==
In 2017, Barron delivered the thirtieth Erasmus Lecture titled Evangelizing the Nones, organized by First Things magazine and the Institute on Religion and Public Life. In his lecture, Barron addressed the growing rise of religious disaffiliation among younger generations, often referred to as the “nones.” He argued that the Church must respond through a renewed commitment to intellectual evangelization, beauty, and moral witness, drawing from the Catholic intellectual tradition to reengage a skeptical modern audience.

Barron has been invited to speak about religion at the headquarters of Amazon, Facebook, and Google. He has keynoted several conferences and events over the world, including the 2016 World Youth Day and the 2015 World Meeting of Families.

== Works ==
=== Books ===
- A Study of the De potentia of Thomas Aquinas in Light of the Dogmatik of Paul Tillich (1993)
- Thomas Aquinas: Spiritual Master (1996)
- And Now I See: A Theology of Transformation (1998)
- Heaven in Stone and Glass (2000)
- The Strangest Way: Walking the Christian Path (2002)
- Bridging the Great Divide: Musings of a Post-Liberal, Post-Conservative, Evangelical Catholic (2004)
- The Priority of Christ: Toward a Post-Liberal Catholicism (2007)
- Word on Fire: Proclaiming the Power of Christ (2008)
- Eucharist (2008)
- Catholicism: A Journey to the Heart of the Faith (2011)
- New King for a New Kingdom (2012)
- The New Evangelization and the New Media (2014)
- Seeds of the Word: Finding God in the Culture (2015)
- 2 Samuel. Brazos Theological Commentary on the Bible (2015)
- Exploring Catholic Theology: Essays on God, Liturgy, and Evangelization (2015)
- El Misterio de Dios - Guia de Studio (The Mystery of God Study Guide) (by Robert Barron and Trent Horn) (2015)
- Vibrant Paradoxes: The Both/And of Catholicism (2016)
- To Light a Fire on the Earth: Proclaiming the Gospel in a Secular Age (2017)
- Arguing Religion: A Bishop Speaks at Facebook and Google (2018)
- Letter to a Suffering Church: A Bishop Speaks on the Sexual Abuse Crisis (2019)
- Centered: The Spirituality of Word on Fire (2020)
- The Pivotal Players: 12 Heroes Who Shaped the Church and Changed the World (2020)
- Renewing Our Hope: Essays for the New Evangelization (2020)
- The Rosary with Bishop Robert Barron (2021)
- Light from Light: A Theological Reflection on the Nicene Creed (2021)
- Proclaiming the Power of Christ: Classic Sermons (2021)
- Redeeming the Time: Gospel Perspectives on the Challenges of the Hour (2022)
- The Great Story of Israel: Election, Freedom, Holiness (2022)
- This is My Body: A Call to Eucharistic Revival (2023)
- Come Lord Jesus: Timeless Homilies for Advent and Christmas (2023)
- 2023 Advent Gospel Reflections (2023)
- 2024 Lenten Gospel Reflections (2024)
- An Introduction to Prayer (2024)
- 2025 Lenten Gospel Reflections (2025)

=== DVDs ===
- Untold Blessings The Three Paths of Holiness (2005)
- Conversion (2006)
- Faith Clips (2007)
- Seven Deadly Sins, Seven Lively Virtues (2007)
- Eucharist (2009)
- Catholicism (2011)
- Catholicism: The New Evangelization (2013)
- Priest, Prophet, King (2014)
- The Mystery of God (2015)
- Catholicism: The Pivotal Players Volume I (2016)
- David the King (2017)
- The Mass (2018)
- Catholicism: The Pivotal Players St. Augustine & St. Benedict (2018)
- Catholicism: The Pivotal Players Fulton Sheen & Flannery O'Connor (2019)
- The Sacraments (2020)
- The Creed (2021)

== Distinctions ==
=== Orders ===
- Holy See:
  - Order of the Holy Sepulchre

=== Honorary academic awards ===
- 2025: Doctor of Public Service, Honoris Causa Catholic University of America
- 2023: Doctor of Public Service, Honoris Causa Hillsdale College
- 2022: Doctor of Humane Letters, Honoris Causa Benedictine College
- 2019: Doctor of Theology, Honoris Causa Pontifical University of St. Thomas Aquinas
- 2018: Doctor of Humane Letters, Honoris Causa Assumption College
- 2017: Doctor of Divinity, Honoris Causa Saint Anselm College
- 2016: Doctor of Sacred Theology, Honoris Causa Dominican House of Studies
- 2013: Doctor of Religious Education, Honoris Causa Providence College
- 2012: Doctor of Humanities, Honoris Causa Lewis University

=== Awards ===
- 2025: Josef-Pieper-Preis (Germany)
- 2015: Fisher's Net Award for Best Overall and for Best Social Media Presence
- 2012: Relevant Radio Christ Brings Hope Award
- 2003: Catholic Press Association Book Award: The Strangest Way: Walking the Christian Path
- 1998: Catholic Press Association Journalism Award: Best Article - Clergy, Religious, "The Uncanny God"
- 1997: Catholic Press Association Book Award: Thomas Aquinas: Spiritual Master
- 1995: Catholic Press Association Journalism Award: Best Article - Professional and Special Interest, "Priest as Bearer of the Mystery"

== See also ==
- Catholic Church hierarchy
- Catholic Church in the United States
- Historical list of the Catholic bishops of the United States
- List of Catholic bishops of the United States
- Lists of patriarchs, archbishops, and bishops

Catholic Church titles
Preceded by John M. Quinn	Bishop of Winona-Rochester; July 29, 2022–present	Incumbent
Preceded by Laurent Marie Bernard Dognin	— TITULAR — Bishop of Macriana in Mauretania; September 8, 2015–July 29, 2022	
Academic offices
Preceded by Dennis J. Lyle	President-Rector of University of Saint Mary of the Lake; Mundelein Seminary; 2012–2015	Succeeded by John Kartje
