= Joseph Buh =

Slovenian-American Catholic priest (1833–1922)

Servant of God, Monsignor Joseph Buh
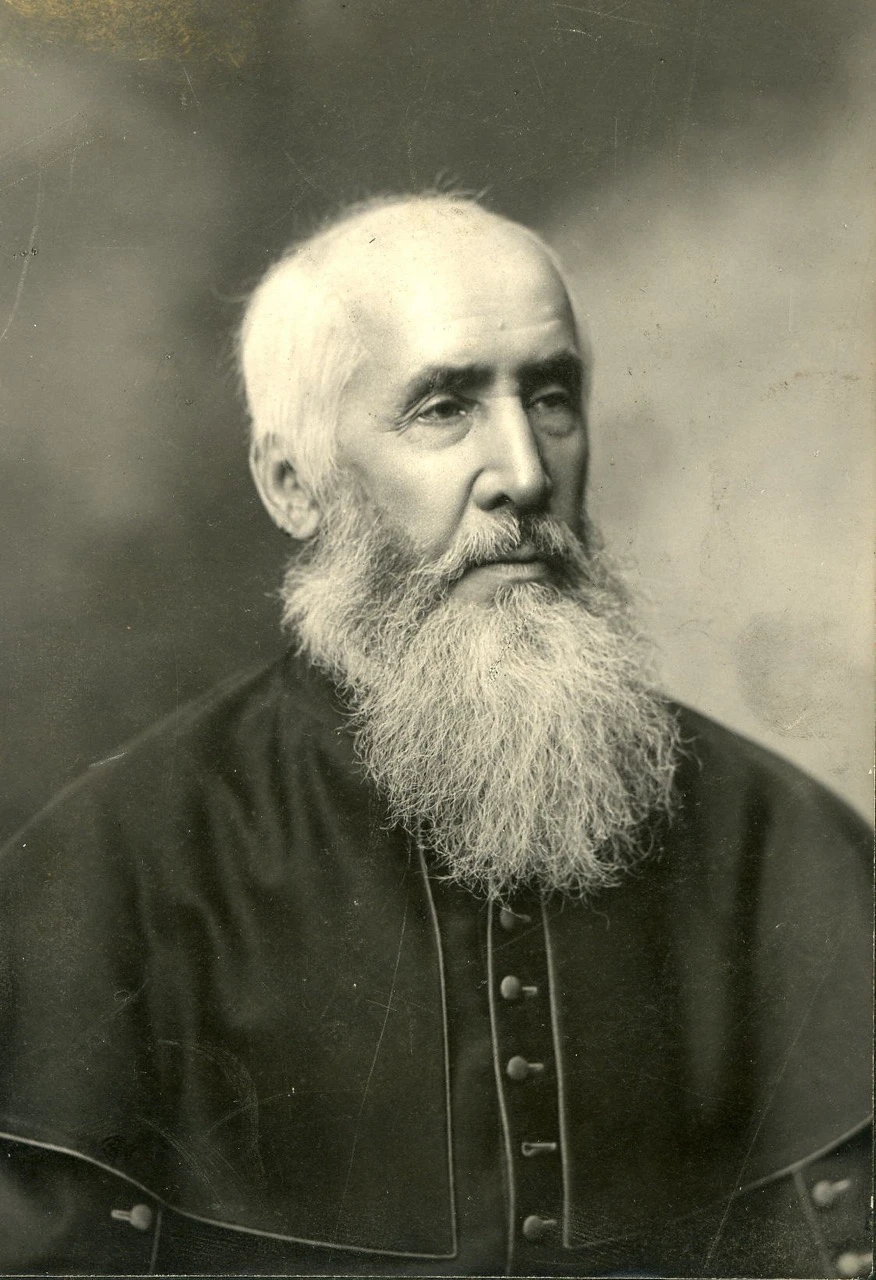
- Church: Catholic Church
- Diocese: Duluth

Orders
- Ordination: 1858

Personal details
- Born: Joseph Francis Buh; March 17, 1833 Sadobie, Austrian Empire
- Died: February 2, 1922 (aged 88) Duluth, Minnesota, U.S.
- Buried: Cathedral of Our Lady of the Rosary, Duluth

Joseph Francis Buh (/buː/ BOO, Slovene: Jožef Frančišek Buh; March 17, 1833 – February 2, 1922) was a Slovene Catholic priest ordained in 1858 who arrived as a missionary in Minnesota in 1864. While he originally arrived in Minnesota to minister to the Slovene population, Buh began to minister to the indigenous Ojibwe population. He helped found over 50 parishes in the area, earning him the title "Patriarch of the Diocese of Duluth".

After Buh's death in 1922, a cult of devotion developed. Interest in opening a cause for canonization was renewed in the 2020s. Efforts were approved by the United States Conference of Catholic Bishops in 2026.

== Early life ==
Joseph Francis Buh was born in Sadobie, Carniola, Austria (modern day Zadobje, Slovenia) to Mathias Buch and Maria Buch (née Koshier) and baptized Joseph Buch on March 17, 1833, in Lučine. He was ordained to the priesthood in 1858, at the age of 25, in Ljubljana. He served as a priest in the Municipality of Loški Potok for two years before being transferred to Radeče. After expressing an interest in missionary work, Buh was contacted by Francis Xavier Pierz about the possibility. They embarked at Le Havre, France on April 10, 1864, for New York. Frederick Katzer and James Trobec were on the same ship.

== Missionary work ==
Buh arrived in St. Paul in April 1864 and settled in Crow Wing County. Not long after, he moved to Belle Prairie and began working among the indigenous people as a missionary. Within several months, Buh learned Ojibwe. He eventually settled in Perham. The Vicariate of Northern Minnesota was established in 1875, and the Diocese of Duluth was established from that territory in 1889. Buh, at the time ministering to Slovenes in Northern Minnesota, was called upon by Bishop James McGolrick to be his vicar general. Together with another Slovene priest, Francis X. Bajec, he established a miner's union. He made two trips back to Europe as a priest, first in 1870 which included a visit to the Holy Land and the second in 1883 for his silver jubilee. On both occasions, he returned with missionary seminarians.

Buh was fond of working with Native Americans, and spoke out for their well-being. He was given names by the Chippewa: "Little Book" (Ojibwe: Masinaigans) and "Long Beard" (Ojibwe: Meshidong). He was the first to hold Catholic religious services at White Earth.

In 1888, he took up residence in Tower, Minnesota. During his time in residence there, he built churches in Two Harbors, Ely, and Virginia.

Buh helped establish over 50 parishes in the Diocese of Duluth. In 1899, he was named a Domestic Prelate of His Holiness by Pope Leo XIII. A ceremony conferring the title took place at the former Cathedral (Church) of the Sacred Heart, 201 W. 4th St., Duluth (1894-1985), on December 27, attended by Archbishop John Ireland, Bishop Joseph Bernard Cotter, Bishop John Shanley and Bishop James Trobec.

== Death ==
Buh died on February 2, 1922, at St. Mary's Hospital in Duluth after having fallen ill several days prior and receiving Last Rites on February 1. He was interred at Calvary Cemetery in Duluth. At his funeral Mass, Bishop Timothy McNicholas stated he had an "extraordinary zeal" and that "no journey on foot, no distance by horseback was too long or too trying provided a soul was to be helped at the journey's end"; McNicholas went on to call him a "saintly priest", a "hunter of souls", and "fisher of men".

== Legacy ==
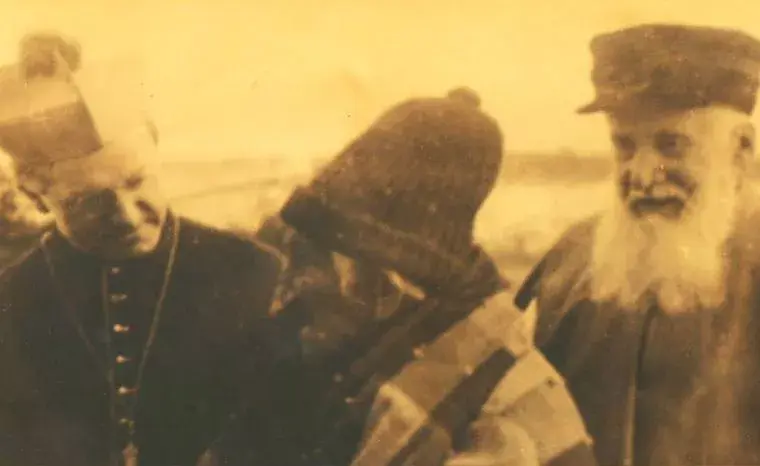
Bishop Timothy McNicholas, Gah-Be-Nah-Quor-Yarca, and Buh

After his death, holy cards with a picture of Buh and containing clippings from a shirt of his were distributed by religious sisters. While there were signs of devotion to him, no formal cause for canonization was initiated at that time. Buh Township in Morrison County, Minnesota, was named after him.

In the fall of 2023, the bishop of Duluth, Daniel Felton, began discussing a cause for canonization for Buh with local clergy. His body was exhumed on July 25, 2024, and reinterred in the Cathedral of Our Lady of the Rosary in Duluth on June 10, 2025. Canonization efforts were approved by the United States Conference of Catholic Bishops in 2026. His cause was formally opened on September 22, 2026, at a Mass at the diocesan cathedral. He now has the title Servant of God.
