= Thomas Anthony Welch =

American prelate

His Eminence, The Most Reverend Thomas Anthony Welch
- Bishop of Duluth
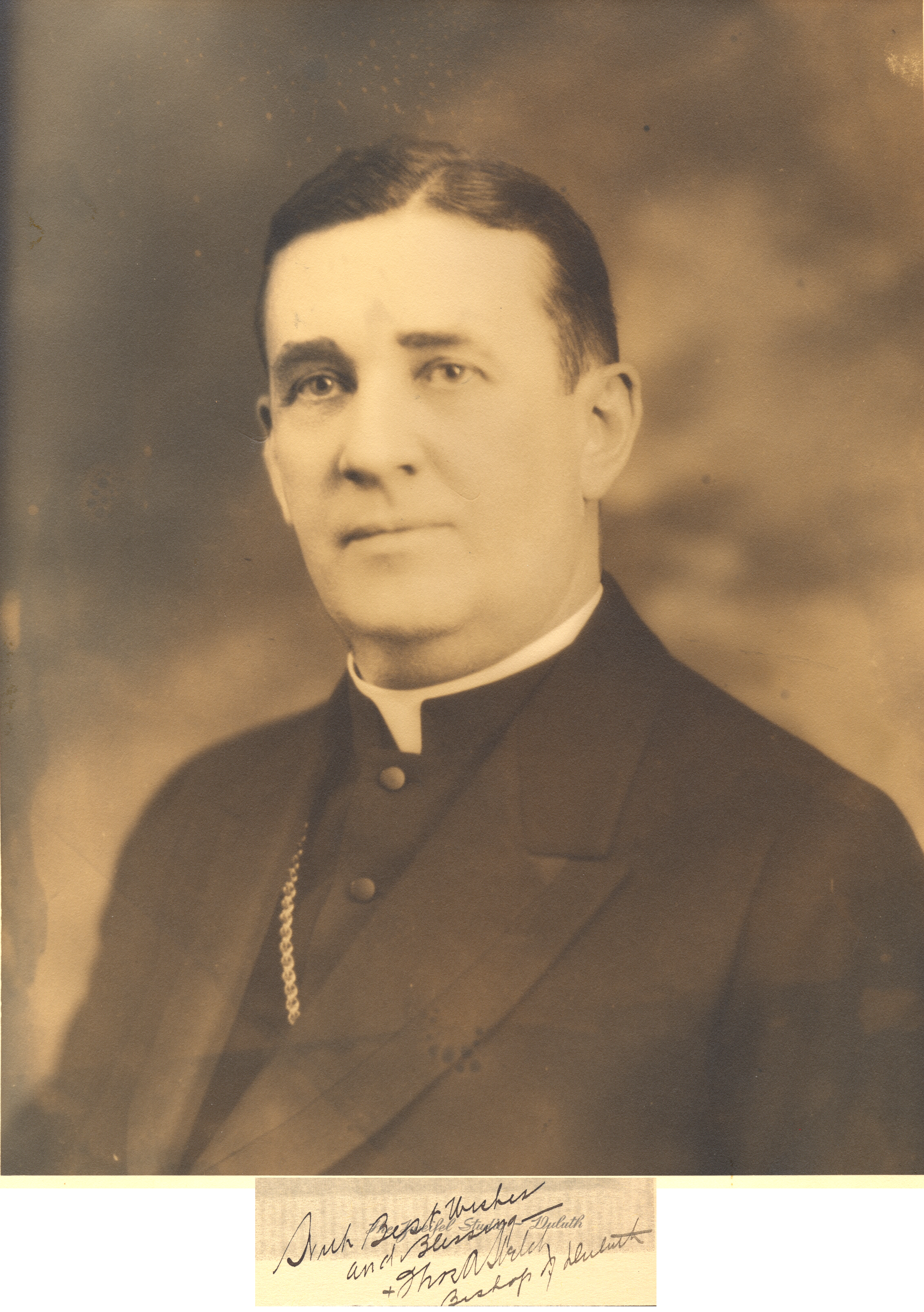
- Church: Roman Catholic Church
- See: Diocese of Duluth
- Predecessor: John T. McNicholas
- Successor: Francis Joseph Schenk

Orders
- Ordination: June 11, 1909 by John Ireland
- Consecration: February 3, 1926 by Austin Dowling

Personal details
- Born: November 2, 1884 Faribault, Minnesota, US
- Died: September 9, 1959 (aged 74) Duluth, Minnesota, US
- Education: College of St. Thomas; St. Paul Seminary
- Motto: Vigilemus cum Christo (Let us watch with Christ)

Thomas Anthony Welch (November 2, 1884 – September 9, 1959) was an American prelate of the Roman Catholic Church. He served as bishop of Duluth in Minnesota from 1926 until his death in 1959.

== Biography ==
=== Early life ===
Thomas Welch was born on November 2, 1884, in Faribault, Minnesota, to Thomas J. and Ellen (née Deasy) Welch. He studied at College of St. Thomas and St. Paul Seminary, both in St. Paul, Minnesota. He was ordained to the priesthood at the Cathedral of Saint Paul in St. Paul, Minnesota, for the Archdiocese of St. Paul and Minneapolis on June 11, 1909.

Welch served as secretary to Archbishop John Ireland (1909–1918) and to his successor, Archbishop Austin Dowling (1919–1922). He also served as chancellor (1918–1923) and vicar general of the archdiocese. The Vatican named Welch as a domestic prelate in February 1924.

=== Bishop of Duluth ===
On December 17, 1925, Welch was appointed the third bishop of Duluth by Pope Pius XI. He received his episcopal consecration at the Cathedral of Saint Paul on February 3, 1926, from Archbishop Dowling, with Bishops James O'Reilly and Joseph Busch serving as co-consecrators. During his 33-year tenure, Welch remedied the financial crisis in the diocese and also constructed the Cathedral of Our Lady of the Rosary in Duluth.

Thomas Welch died in Duluth on September 8, 1959, at age 74.

Catholic Church titles
Preceded by John T. McNicholas	Bishop of Duluth; 1925–1959	Succeeded by Francis Joseph Schenk
