= Paul Sirba =

American Roman Catholic prelate (1960–2019)

His Excellency, The Most Reverend Paul David Sirba
- Bishop of Duluth
- Archdiocese: Saint Paul and Minneapolis
- Diocese: Duluth
- Appointed: October 19, 2009
- Installed: December 14, 2009
- Predecessor: Dennis Schnurr
- Successor: Daniel Felton

Orders
- Ordination: May 31, 1986 by John Robert Roach
- Consecration: December 14, 2009 by John Clayton Nienstedt, Peter F. Christensen, and Lee A. Piché

Personal details
- Born: September 2, 1960 Minneapolis, Minnesota, United States
- Died: December 1, 2019 (aged 59) Duluth, Minnesota, United States
- Education: University of St. Thomas; Saint Paul Seminary; Notre Dame Institute for Catechetics
- Motto: Fiat voluntas tua (Thy will be done)

Styles of Paul David Sirba
- Reference style: His Excellency; The Most Reverend
- Spoken style: Your Excellency
- Religious style: Bishop

Paul David Sirba (September 2, 1960 – December 1, 2019) was an American prelate of the Roman Catholic Church who served as bishop of the Diocese of Duluth in Minnesota from 2009 until his death in 2019

== Early life and education ==
Paul Sirba was born on September 2, 1960, in Minneapolis, Minnesota. He attended Nativity of Mary Catholic School in Bloomington, Minnesota, and later graduated from the Academy of Holy Angels in Richfield, Minnesota. Sirba then went to University of St. Thomas in St. Paul. He completed his studies at the Saint Paul Seminary in St. Paul, Minnesota and at the Notre Dame Institute for Catechetics in Alexandria, Virginia.

== Priesthood ==
Sirba was ordained a priest at the Cathedral of Saint Paul in St. Paul on May 31, 1986, by Archbishop John Robert Roach for the Archdiocese of Saint Paul and Minneapolis. After his ordination, the archdiocese assigned Sirba as assistant pastor at Saint Olaf Parish in Minneapolis. In 1990, he was transferred to serve at Saint John the Baptist Parish in Savage, Minnesota, for one year.

Sirba was named spiritual director of the Saint Paul Seminary School of Divinity, holding that position until 2000. In 2001, he was named pastor of the Maternity of Mary Parish in St. Paul. Sirba left Maternity of Mary to become director of spiritual formation at Saint Paul school in 2006. He was named vicar general and moderator of the curia for the archdiocese in June 2009.

== Bishop of Duluth ==
On October 15, 2009, Pope Benedict XVI appointed Sirba as bishop of Duluth succeeding Bishop Dennis Schnurr. Sirba was consecrated at the Duluth Entertainment Convention Center in Duluth on December 14, 2009, by Archbishop John Nienstedt.

On December 1, 2019, Sirba was preparing to celebrate mass at St. Rose Church in Proctor, Minnesota, when he suffered a cardiac arrest. He died in Duluth that same day at age 59 at a local hospital.

== See also ==
- Catholic Church hierarchy
- Catholic Church in the United States
- Historical list of the Catholic bishops of the United States
- List of the Catholic bishops of the United States
- Lists of patriarchs, archbishops, and bishops

Catholic Church titles
Preceded by Dennis Schnurr	Bishop of Duluth; 2009–2019	Succeeded by Daniel John Felton
