= Buh Township, Morrison County, Minnesota =

Buh Township, Minnesota
- Township
- Location within the state of Minnesota Buh Township, Minnesota (the United States)
- Coordinates: 46°2′4″N 94°8′25″W
- Country: United States
- State: Minnesota
- County: Morrison

Area
  - Total: 35.9 sq mi (92.9 km^{2})
  - Land: 35.8 sq mi (92.8 km^{2})
  - Water: 0.039 sq mi (0.1 km^{2})
- Elevation: 1,180 ft (360 m)

Population (2000)
  - Total: 572
  - Density: 16/sq mi (6.2/km^{2})
- Time zone: UTC-6 (Central (CST))
  - Summer (DST): UTC-5 (CDT)
- FIPS code: 27-08506
- GNIS feature ID: 0663698

Buh Township is a township in Morrison County, Minnesota, United States. The population was 572 at the 2000 census.

== History ==
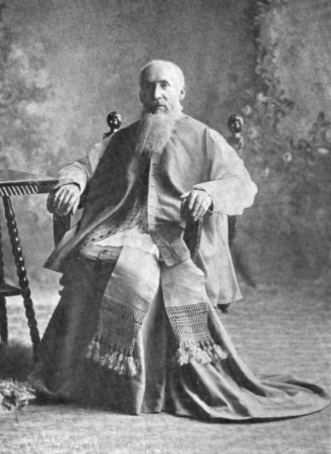
Joseph Francis Buh

Buh Township was organized in 1894, and named for Joseph Francis Buh, a Roman Catholic priest who worked in the area.

== Geography ==
According to the United States Census Bureau, the township has a total area of 35.9 square miles (93 km^{2}), of which 35.8 square miles (93 km^{2}) is land and 0.1 square miles (0.26 km^{2}) (0.14%) is water.

== Demographics ==
There were 179 households, out of which 45.8% had children under the age of 18 living with them, 71.5% were married couples living together, 4.5% had a female householder with no husband present, and 20.7% were non-families. 17.3% of all households were made up of individuals, and 6.7% had someone living alone who was 65 years of age or older. The average household size was 3.15 and the average family size was 3.64.

In the township the population was spread out, with 31.6% under the age of 18, 9.4% from 18 to 24, 28.7% from 25 to 44, 21.5% from 45 to 64, and 8.7% who were 65 years of age or older. The median age was 33 years. For every 100 females, there were 115.0 males. For every 100 females age 18 and over, there were 116.0 males.

The median income for a household in the township was $33,036, and the median income for a family was $39,688. Males had a median income of $26,389 versus $16,719 for females. The per capita income for the township was $13,168. About 11.7% of families and 14.1% of the population were below the poverty line, including 15.4% of those under age 18 and 12.0% of those age 65 or over.
