= Endion station =

Railway station in Minnesota, US

- Duluth Missabe and Iron Range Depot (Endion)
- U.S. National Register of Historic Places
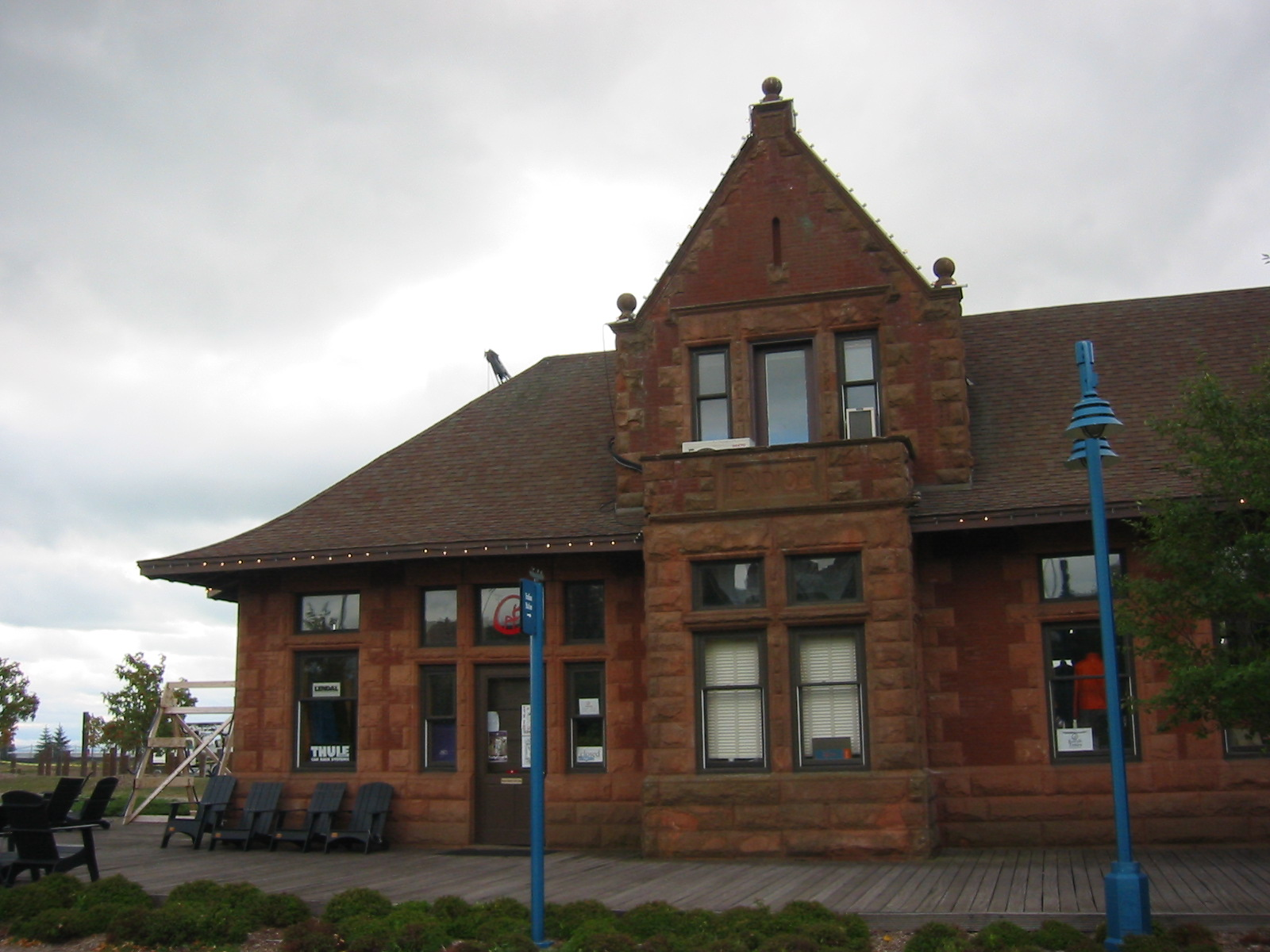
- Endion station viewed from the north

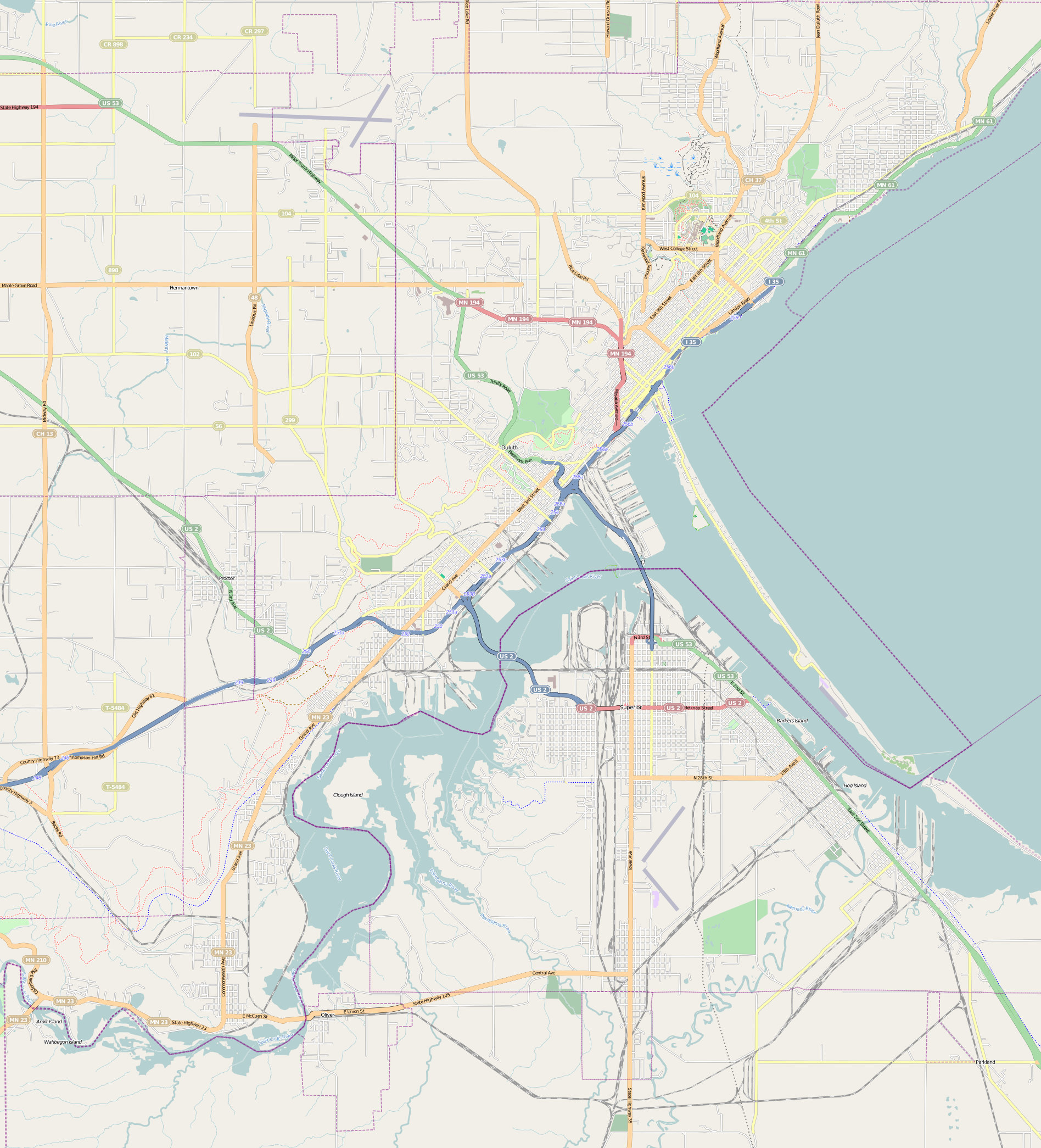
- Location within Duluth Location within Minnesota Location within the United States
- Location: 100 Lake Place, Duluth, Minnesota
- Coordinates: 46°47′10.8″N 92°5′42.5″W
- Area: Less than one acre
- Built: 1899
- Architect: I. Vernon Hill
- Architectural style: Richardsonian Romanesque
- NRHP reference No.: 75002088
- Added to NRHP: April 16, 1975

Endion station is a former train station in Duluth, Minnesota, United States. It was built in 1899 to serve the Endion neighborhood but was relocated to Canal Park in 1986 to make way for expansion of Interstate 35. Passenger service through the station had ceased in 1961 and freight service in 1978.

The building was listed on the National Register of Historic Places in 1975 under the name Duluth Missabe and Iron Range Depot (Endion) for its local significance in the themes of architecture and transportation. It was nominated for its status as one of Duluth's few surviving small passenger depots and as a seminal work of local architect I. Vernon Hill.

== History ==
The Duluth and Iron Range Railroad (later the Duluth, Missabe and Iron Range Railway) began transporting passengers between Duluth and Two Harbors, Minnesota, in 1886. The railroad was an essential link between small communities on the North Shore of Lake Superior. The line's first stop outside of downtown Duluth was at Endion. Endion was originally an independent town north of Duluth, but by the end of the nineteenth century it had been absorbed by the growing city.

In 1899 the railroad commissioned the architectural firm of Tenbusch & Hill to design a small passenger depot for the Endion station. The building was completed in 1899 at a cost of $10,000 (equivalent to $387,000 in 2025). It originally sat only 100 feet (30 m) from the shore of Lake Superior, at 1504 South Street. The depot's design called for a foundation and trim of Kettle River sandstone, red brick body, and slate roof. The depot's design is a variation on the Richardsonian Romanesque style popular in the 1880s and 1890s, marked by rounded arches, deeply recessed windows, and heavy stonework, However its small scale is less imposing than larger Richardsonian Romanesque buildings.

In its heyday, the Duluth, Missabe and Iron Range depot at Endion was a busy station. Six trains arrived and departed each day. Some took suburban residents to and from downtown Duluth for work. Others transported passengers and freight up the North Shore. The Duluth, Missabe and Iron Range railroad service, including the vital Endion station depot, was critical in the growth of Duluth's East End. In the second half of the twentieth century, however, passenger rail service declined significantly. The last passenger train left Endion station on July 15, 1961. The railroad continued to use the depot for freight service until 1978.

== Reuse and preservation ==
The Endion station was listed on the National Register of Historic Places in 1975. By the 1970s, the small depot was the last of its kind in Duluth. The depot was also architecturally significant. The building is designed with projecting gables that form a transept. Its architect, I. Vernon Hill, went on to have a distinctive impact on the architecture of Duluth in the early 20th century, using the projecting gables as a trademark. The depot's beauty, lakeside location, and link to the railroad history of Duluth made its preservation a priority.

After its closure in 1978 the building was vacant. Duluth architect Edward Schafer purchased, restored, and renovated the depot for use as an office in 1980. In 1986 the building was threatened by the planned expansion of Interstate 35. However, since the building was important as a piece of architecture and a part of Duluth's railroad history, the building was saved. State and local officials decided to move the depot. In June 1986 the depot was removed from its original foundation and moved to a new home in Duluth's Canal Park at a cost of nearly $400,000 (equivalent to $1,174,863 in 2025).

After its move, the depot hosted a variety of commercial and municipal programs. The city of Duluth sold the depot in 2012. In July 2014 the Endion Station Public House opened in the building, but it has closed as of March 2019. In November 2019, Rod Raymond, owner of Fitger's Brewhouse, remodeled the building into a five-bedroom hotel.

== See also ==
- National Register of Historic Places listings in St. Louis County, Minnesota
