= Daniel Felton =

American Catholic bishop

His Excellency, The Most Reverend Daniel John Felton
- Bishop of Duluth
- Diocese: Duluth
- Appointed: April 7, 2021
- Installed: May 20, 2021
- Predecessor: Paul Sirba

Orders
- Ordination: June 13, 1981 by Aloysius John Wycislo
- Consecration: May 20, 2021 by Bernard Hebda, Thomas Paprocki, and David L. Ricken

Personal details
- Born: February 5, 1955 (age 71) Portsmouth, Virginia, US
- Education: St. Norbert College; St. John's University; Pontifical Gregorian University
- Motto: Believe in the good news

Styles of Daniel John Felton
- Reference style: His Excellency; The Most Reverend
- Spoken style: Your Excellency
- Religious style: Bishop

Daniel John Felton (born February 5, 1955) is an American Catholic prelate who has served as Bishop of Duluth in Minnesota since 2021.

== Biography ==
=== Early life ===
Daniel Felton was born on February 5, 1955, in Portsmouth, Virginia, to Carol and Ken Felton. He has four younger siblings. Felton went to grade school at St. Edward School in Mackville, Wisconsin, then attended Appleton West High School in Appleton, Wisconsin.

After graduating from high school, Felton entered St. Norbert College in DePere, Wisconsin, where he received a Bachelor of Arts degree in psychology and religious studies in 1977. Having decided to become a priest, Felton enrolled in St. John's University in St. Joseph, Minnesota; he was granted a Master of Theology degree in 1981.

=== Priesthood ===
On June 13, 1981, Felton was ordained to the priesthood for the Diocese of Green Bay by Bishop Aloysius Wycislo at Saint Francis Xavier Cathedral in Green Bay. After his 1981 ordination, the diocese assigned Felton as an associate pastor at Blessed Holy Innocents Parish in Manitowoc, Wisconsin.

Felton left Blessed Holy Innocents in 1985 to take a position in New York City as director of affiliate affairs for the Catholic Telecommunications Network of America. The network in 1987 appointed Felton as its correspondent in Rome. While in Rome, he pursued a Master of Social Communications degree and a Licentiate of Sacred Theology in dogmatic theology from the Pontifical Gregorian University in 1990.Felton returned to Wisconsin in 1990 to serve as pastor at the following parishes:

- St. Raphael in Oshkosh (1990 to 2004)
- St. Francis of Assisi in Manitowoc (2004–2011)
- Three parishes in Mackville, Greenville, and Freedom (2011 to 2014)

In June 2014, Bishop David L. Ricken appointed Felton as vicar general and moderator of the curia for the diocese.

=== Bishop of Duluth ===
Pope Francis appointed Felton as bishop of Duluth on April 7, 2021. On May 20, 2021, Felton was consecrated by Archbishop Bernard Hebda, with Bishops David Ricken and Thomas Paprocki serving as co-consecrators.

In August 2024, Felton launched an initiative for the canonization of Monsignor Joseph Buh. Ordained in 1858, Buh founded over 50 parishes in the diocese and worked extensively with the poor and Native American peoples.

== See also ==
- Catholic Church hierarchy
- Catholic Church in the United States
- Historical list of the Catholic bishops of the United States
- List of Catholic bishops of the United States
- Lists of patriarchs, archbishops, and bishops

== Episcopal succession ==
Catholic Church titles
Preceded by Paul Sirba	Bishop of Duluth; 2021-Present	Succeeded by Incumbent
