= Zadobje =

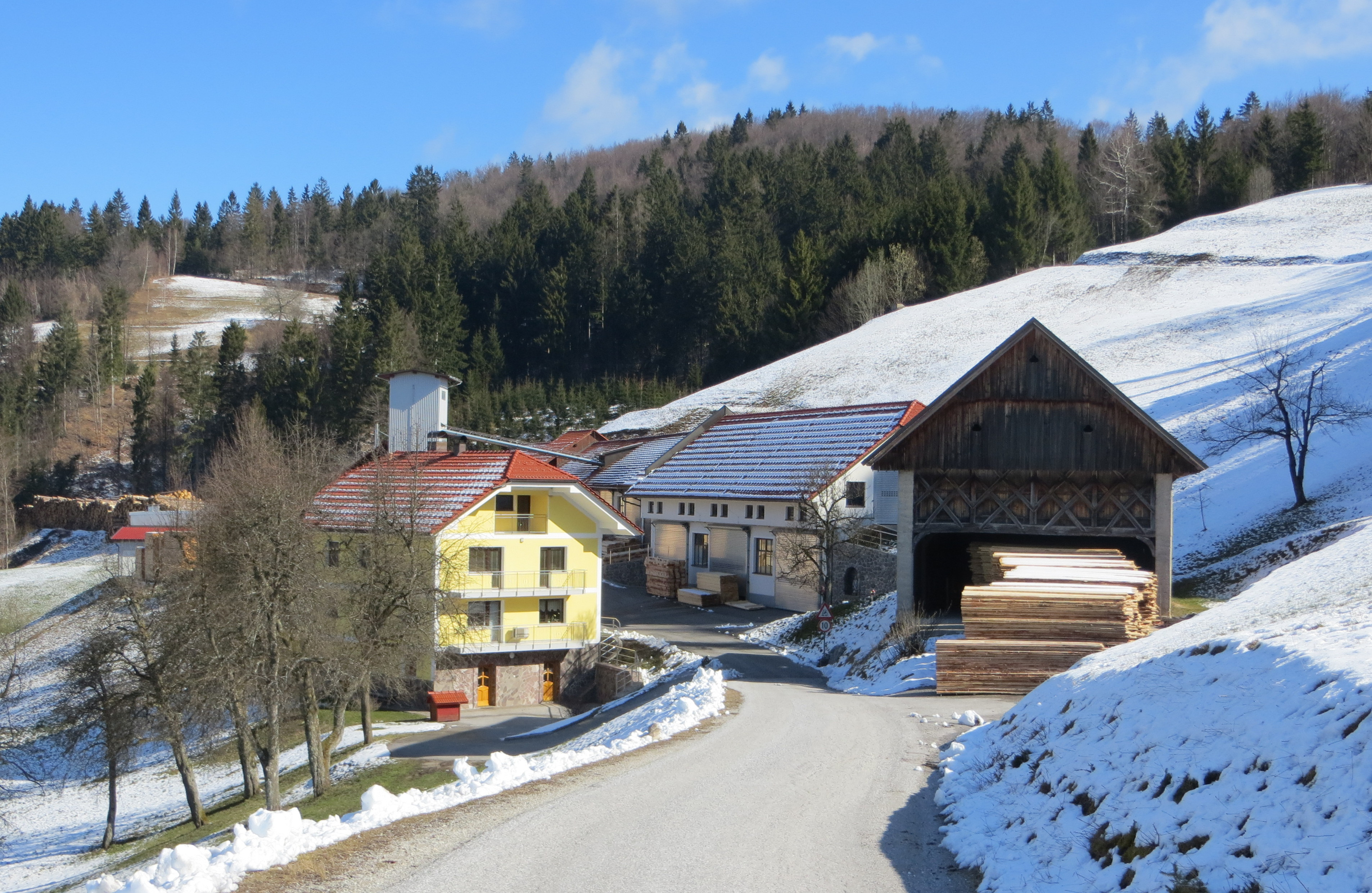

- Location in Slovenia
- Coordinates: 46°4′45.06″N 14°11′16.95″E
- Country: Slovenia
- Traditional region: Upper Carniola
- Statistical region: Upper Carniola
- Municipality: Gorenja Vas–Poljane

Area
  - Total: 3.29 km^{2} (1.27 sq mi)
- Elevation: 718.8 m (2,358 ft)

Population (2020)
  - Total: 58
  - Density: 18/km^{2} (46/sq mi)

Zadobje (pronounced [zaˈdoːbjɛ]; German: Sadobie) is a dispersed settlement in the hills southeast of Gorenja Vas in the Municipality of Gorenja Vas–Poljane in the Upper Carniola region of Slovenia.

== Notable people ==
Notable people that lived or were born in Zadobje include:

- Joseph Buh (1833–1922), Catholic missionary in North America
- Anton Dolinar (1847–1930), Catholic priest and composer
