= Cathedral of Our Lady of the Rosary (Duluth, Minnesota) =

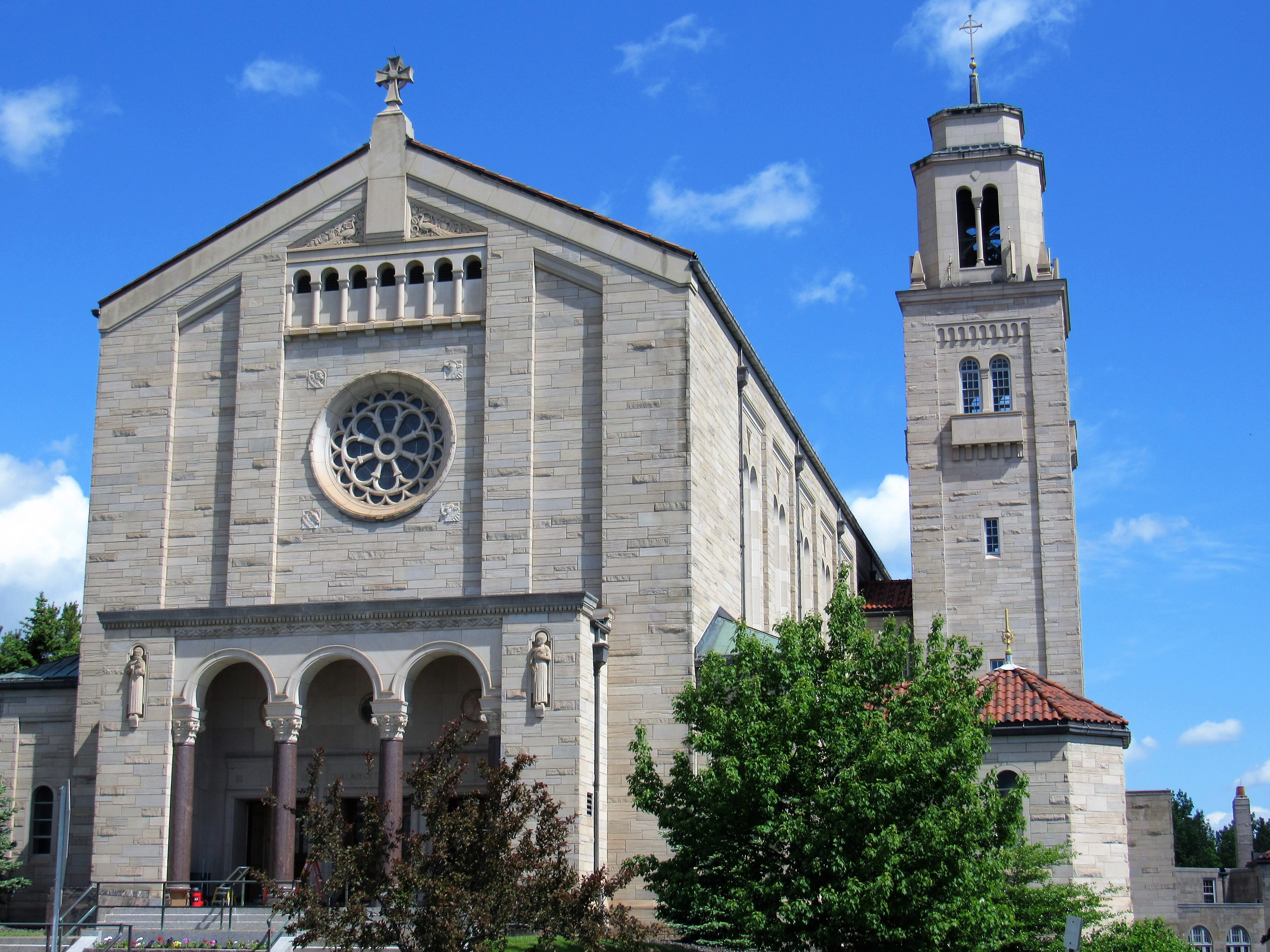

- Location in Minnesota
- 46°48′59″N 92°04′06″W
- Location: 2801 East 4th Street; Duluth, Minnesota
- Country: United States
- Denomination: Roman Catholic Church
- Website: www.duluthcathedral.com

History
- Status: Cathedral
- Founded: 1923

Architecture
- Style: Italianate
- Completed: 1957

Specifications
- Materials: Stone

Administration
- Diocese: Duluth

Clergy
- Bishop: Most Rev. Daniel John Felton
- Rector: Very Rev. Seth Gogolin

The Cathedral of Our Lady of the Rosary, also known simply as the Cathedral of Our Lady, is a Catholic cathedral located in Duluth, Minnesota, United States. It is the seat of the Diocese of Duluth. The present Italianate cathedral was completed in 1957 and replaced the former Sacred Heart Cathedral, which is now a music center.

== See also ==
- List of Catholic cathedrals in the United States
- List of cathedrals in the United States
