= I. Vernon Hill =

American architect

I. Vernon Hill (May 9, 1872 – February 25, 1904) was an English American architect. His designs shaped the developing city of Duluth, Minnesota, at the turn of the 20th century. Although his career lasted less than a decade, his building designs played a central role in defining the architectural landscape of the city.

== Early life ==
Isaac Vernon Hill was born in Stanton under Bardon, England, on May 9, 1872. He immigrated to the United States with his family and settled in Duluth, Minnesota, when he was sixteen. In 1891, Hill began working as a bookkeeper with the Lakeside Land Company. By 1894 he was working for the company as a draftsman.

== Architectural career ==
By 1896, Hill entered into his first architectural partnership with Wallace Wellbanks. Although the partnership lasted only a year, it launched Hill into the Duluth architectural sphere. After parting with Wellbanks, Hill practiced alone until he joined Gerhard Tenbusch in 1899 to create the firm Tenbusch and Hill. While partners with Tenbusch, Hill developed his personal architectural style. The 1899 design for the Endion station displays the projecting gables for which Hill would become famous.

As Tenbusch's partner, Hill designed a home for Duluth druggist Arthur P. Cook in 1900. Hill's design for Cook's Colonial Revival house, situated on a rocky lot on what is now Skyline Parkway, called for stone from the site to construct the walls, stairs, and terraces. The combination of rocky lot and native stone, overlooking Lake Superior, makes the Cook house one of Duluth's most recognizable homes.

In 1902, Hill ended his partnership with Tenbusch and joined William T. Bray in architectural practice. While partners with Bray, Hill designed several distinctive structures. In 1902 he designed the Crosby House, a two-story Viennese Art Nouveau masterpiece. That year Hill also designed a house for his own family. The I. Vernon and Cora Hill House was completed in 1902. The house, a sweeping Tudor Revival structure with gables and a curving buttress, served as a home for Hill and his family for less than two years. Nevertheless, it is often recognized as Hill's greatest architectural endeavor.

During the years of his partnership with Bray, I. Vernon Hill designed several other architecturally notable homes. He also worked with Bray to design the red-brick Sacred Heart School building at Duluth's Sacred Heart Cathedral. However, by the end of 1903, I. Vernon Hill was gravely ill. He moved with his family to California in the hopes that the warm climate might aid his recovery. Hill did not recover. He died of pneumonia on February 25, 1904, at the age of 31.

== Legacy ==
In the years since his death, Hill's designs for the Endion Depot and the Sacred Heart Cathedral School have both been recognized as architectural landmarks and listed on the National Register of Historic Places. His work is preserved and displayed in the notable residences he crafted for Duluth residents at the turn of the 20th century. Although I. Vernon Hill's architectural career was cut short by his premature death, his legacy lives on in the groundbreaking Duluth architecture that he designed.

== See also ==
- List of British architects
- List of American architects
