= James McGolrick =

Irish-born American prelate

His Excellency, The Right Reverend James McGolrick
- Bishop of Duluth
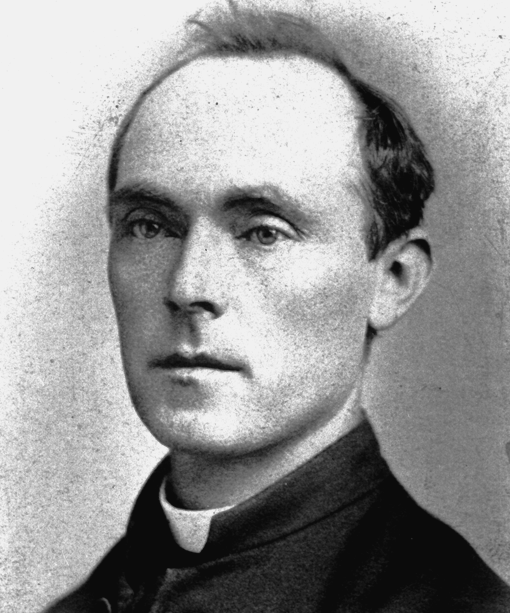
- Church: Catholic Church
- Diocese: Diocese of Duluth
- Appointed: November 29, 1889
- Term ended: January 23, 1918 (his death)
- Predecessor: Office established
- Successor: John T. McNicholas

Orders
- Ordination: June 11, 1867 by David Moriarty
- Consecration: December 27, 1889 by John Ireland

Personal details
- Born: May 1, 1841 Borrisokane, County Tipperary, Ireland
- Died: January 23, 1918 (aged 76) Duluth, Minnesota, U.S.
- Education: All Hallows College
- Motto: Adveniat regnum tuum (Let your kingdom come)

James McGolrick (May 1, 1841 – January 23, 1918) was an Irish-born American prelate of the Catholic Church. He was the first bishop of the Diocese of Duluth in Minnesota, serving from 1889 until his death.

== Biography ==
=== Early life ===
James McGolrick was born on May 1, 1841, in Borrisokane, County Tipperary, to Felix and Bridget (née Henry) McGolrick. Two brothers, William and Henry, also became priests, while two sisters, Bridget and Elizabeth, joined the Sisters of St. Joseph. He began his studies for the priesthood at the seminary of the Diocese of Achonry in Ballaghaderreen.

In 1860, the American bishop Thomas Grace wrote to All Hallows College, Dublin, to recruit seminarians for the Diocese of Saint Paul in Minnesota. McGolrick entered All Hallows in September 1860, his tuition paid by Grace.

=== Priesthood ===
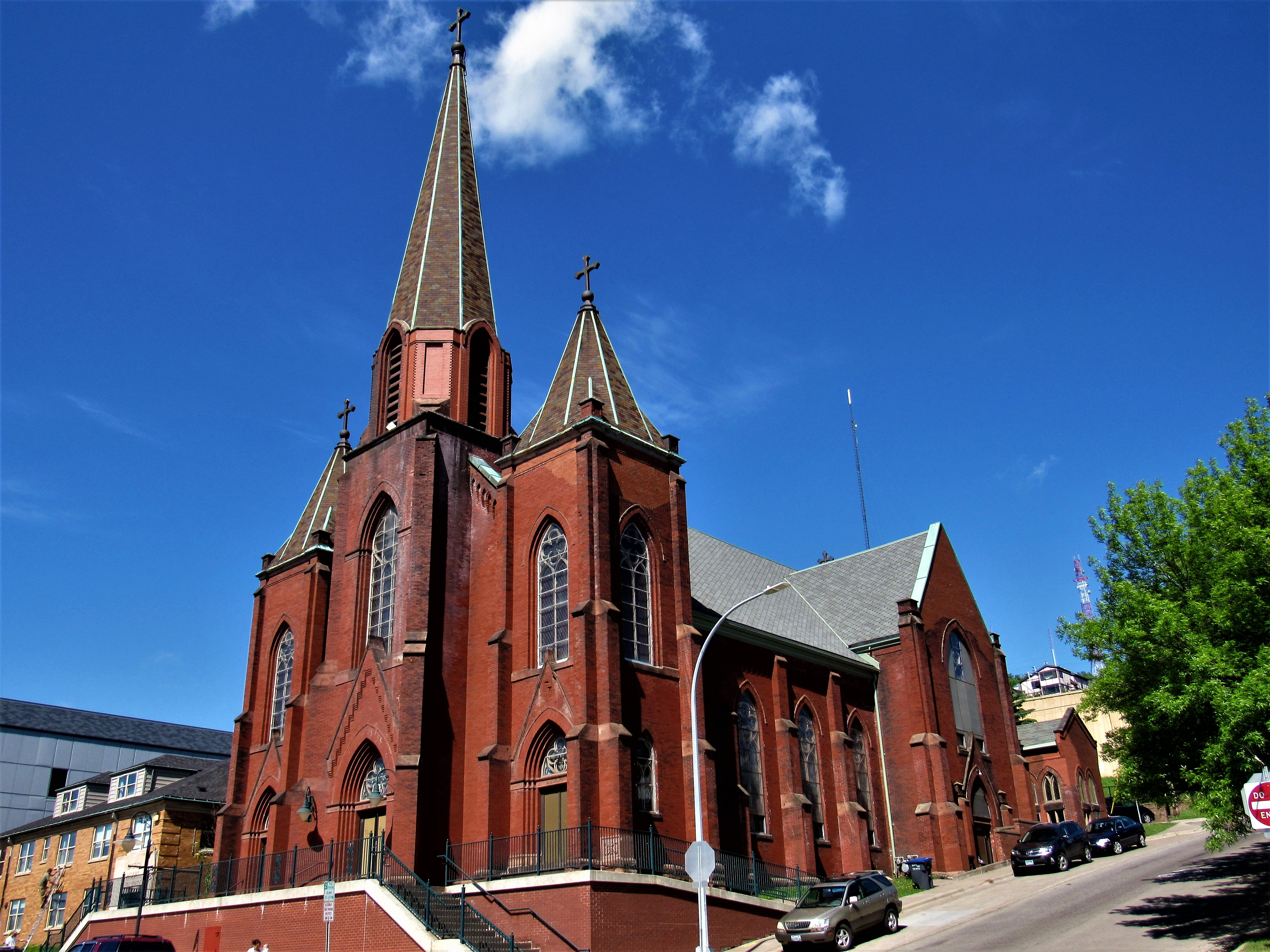
Former Sacred Heart Cathedral, Duluth, Minnesota (2017)

McGolrick was ordained a priest in Ireland for the Diocese of Saint Paul on June 11, 1867, by Bishop David Moriarty.

McGolrick arrived in Saint Paul in August 1867, and his first assignment was as an assistant pastor to Reverend John Ireland (later archbishop of Saint Paul) at the Cathedral of Saint Paul. In October 1868, McGolrick was tasked by Grace to organize a new parish in Minneapolis, Minnesota, for Catholics west of the Mississippi River. He opened the Immaculate Conception Parish that year and served as pastor there until 1889. The original wood-frame building was later replaced by a stone church, with the cornerstone laid in July 1871 followed by a solemn dedication in January 1873.

During his pastorate at Immaculate Conception, McGolrick founded several societies, including a chapter of the Total Abstinence Society that was credited with reforming many people in Minneapolis. He also established the Minneapolis Catholic Orphan Asylum in 1878 and was a trustee of the Minnesota Academy of Science.

=== Bishop of Duluth ===
On November 29, 1889, McGolrick was appointed the first bishop of the newly erected Diocese of Duluth by Pope Leo XIII. He received his episcopal consecration on December 27, 1869, from Archbishop Ireland, with Bishops Grace and Martin Marty serving as co-consecrators, at the Cathedral of Saint Paul.

At the time of McGolrick's arrival in Duluth in January 1890, the young diocese contained 22 priests, 32 churches, ten stations, five parochial schools, and a Catholic population of a little over 20,000. By the time of his death in 1918, there were 59 priests, 42 churches with resident pastors, 46 missions with churches, 35 stations, 11 parochial schools, and a Catholic population of almost 60,000. After a fire destroyed the cathedral in 1892, McGolrick laid the cornerstone for the new Sacred Heart Cathedral in 1894 and dedicated it two years later. He also founded St. Mary's Hospital in Duluth in 1898 and St. James Orphanage in Duluth in 1910.

McGolrick celebrated his silver jubilee as a bishop in 1914 and his golden jubilee as priest in 1917. In civic affairs, he served on Duluth's library board and park board.

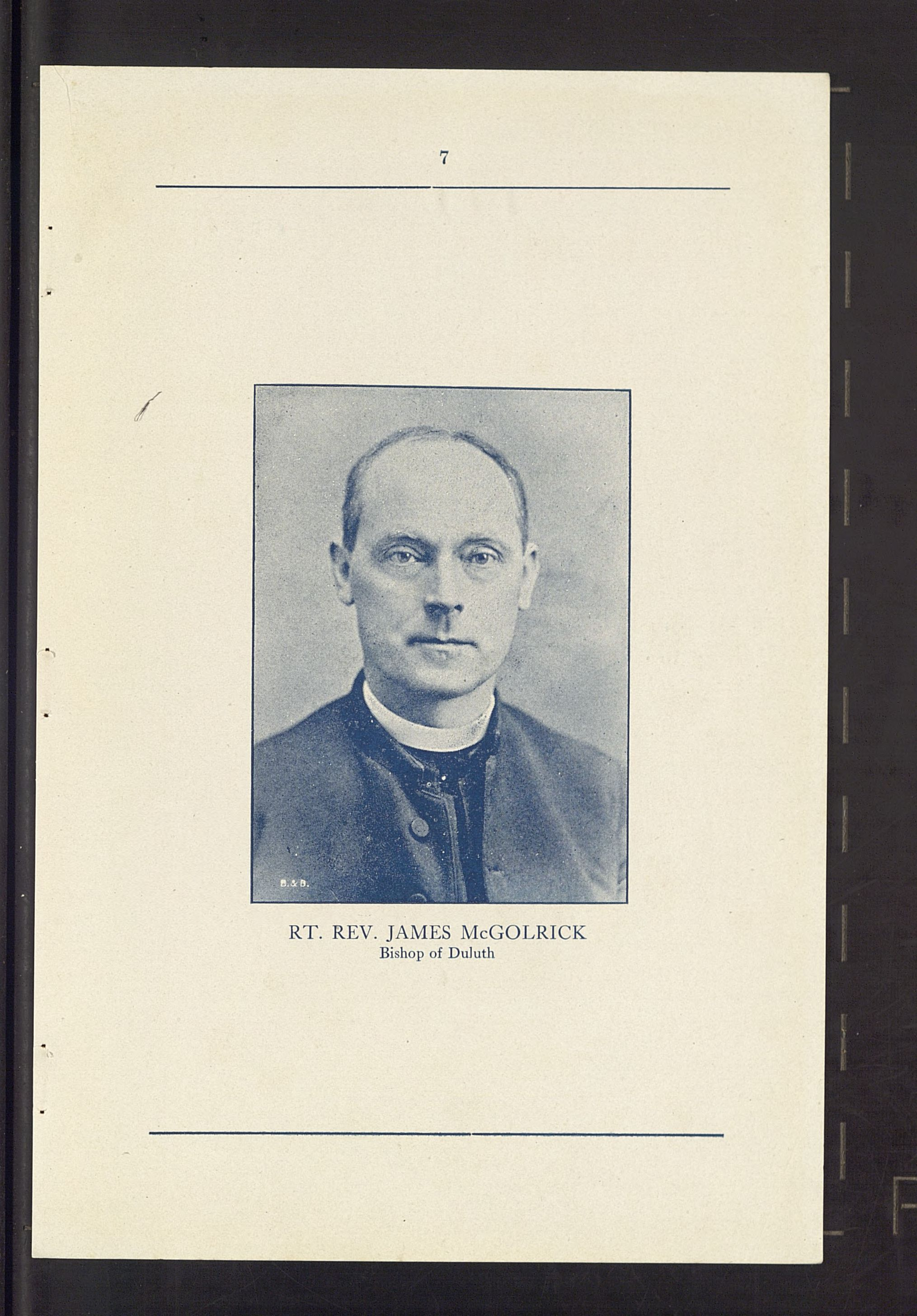
Rt. Rev. James McGolrick, Bishop of Duluth, from A Combined Souvenir, History and Decennial Financial Statement of the Church of Our Lady of the Rosary, Detroit, Minnesota.

=== Death and legacy ===
McGolrick died from what was termed acute indigestion in Duluth on January 23, 1918, aged 76.

Catholic Church titles
Preceded by None	Bishop of Duluth; 1889–1918	Succeeded by John T. McNicholas
