= Paul Francis Anderson =

American prelate

His Excellency, The Most Reverend Paul Francis Anderson
- Bishop of Duluth
- Church: Roman Catholic Church
- See: Diocese of Duluth
- Predecessor: Francis Joseph Schenk
- Successor: Robert Henry Brom

Orders
- Ordination: January 6, 1943 by Richard Cushing
- Consecration: October 17, 1968 by Lambert Anthony Hoch

Personal details
- Born: April 20, 1917 Boston, Massachusetts, US
- Died: January 4, 1987 (aged 69) Rochester, Minnesota, US
- Education: Boston College; St. John's Seminary
- Motto: To proclaim the infinite riches of Christ

Paul Francis Anderson (April 20, 1917 – January 4, 1987) was an American prelate of the Roman Catholic Church. He served as coadjutor bishop and bishop of Duluth in Minnesota (1968–1982) and as an auxiliary bishop of Sioux Falls in South Dakota (1982–1987).

== Biography ==
=== Early life ===
Paul Anderson was born on April 20, 1917, in Roslindale, a neighborhood in Boston, Massachusetts, to Philip and Mary Elizabeth Anderson. His father lost his job during the 1919 Boston Police Strike and later became a motorman on the Boston Elevated Railway. After graduating from Winthrop High School in Winthrop, Massachusetts, in 1935, Anderson enrolled at Boston College. However, after deciding to become a priest, he transferred to St. John's Seminary in Boston.

=== Priesthood ===
Anderson was ordained to the priesthood for the Archdiocese of Boston by Bishop Richard Cushing in Boston on January 6, 1943. After his ordination, the archdiocese assigned Anderson as a curate at Our Lady Comforter of the Afflicted Parish in Waltham.

In 1946, the archdiocese allowed Anderson to serve in the Diocese of Sioux Falls in South Dakota. The diocese then assigned Anderson as a curate at Sacred Heart Parish in Aberdeen, St. Martin Parish in Huron, and Holy Cross Parish in Ipswich, all in South Dakota. From 1947 to 1959, he served as administrator of St. Catherine Parish in Oldham, South Dakota. During his tenure in Oldham, he built a new church after the original structure was destroyed in a fire. He later served as pastor of St. Patrick Parish in Montrose (1959–1962), St. Mary Parish in Salem (1962–65), and St. Martin Parish in Huron (1965–1969), all in South Dakota. During his pastoral work, he became active in the Christian Family Movement.

=== Coadjutor Bishop and Bishop of Duluth ===
On July 19, 1968, Anderson was appointed coadjutor bishop of Duluth and titular bishop of Polinianum by Pope Paul VI to assist Bishop Francis Joseph Schenk. Anderson received his episcopal consecration on October 17, 1968, from Bishop Lambert Anthony Hoch, with Schenk and Bishop Thomas Joseph Riley serving as co-consecrators.

When Schenk retired, Anderson succeeded him as the fifth bishop of Duluth on April 30, 1969. During his 13-year tenure, he earned a reputation as an advocate for progressive causes, and worked to implement the reforms of the Second Vatican Council of the early 1960s. He organized five regional pastoral councils, encouraged charismatic services, and improved Catholic relations with Protestants and Jews. He privately believed in the ordination of women, and appointed one of the first laywomen to serve on a diocesan matrimonial court.

=== Auxiliary Bishop of Sioux Falls ===
On August 17, 1982, Anderson resigned as bishop of Duluth; he was appointed the first auxiliary bishop of Sioux Falls by Pope John Paul II. As an auxiliary bishop, he served as diocesan vicar for spiritual renewal.

Anderson died from complications following cancer surgery at St. Mary's Hospital in Rochester, Minnesota, at age 69.

Catholic Church titles
Preceded by Francis Joseph Schenk	Bishop of Duluth; 1969–1982	Succeeded by Robert Henry Brom
