= John T. McNicholas =

20th-century American Catholic archbishop

His Excellency, The Most Reverend John Timothy McNicholas O.P.
- Archbishop of Cincinnati
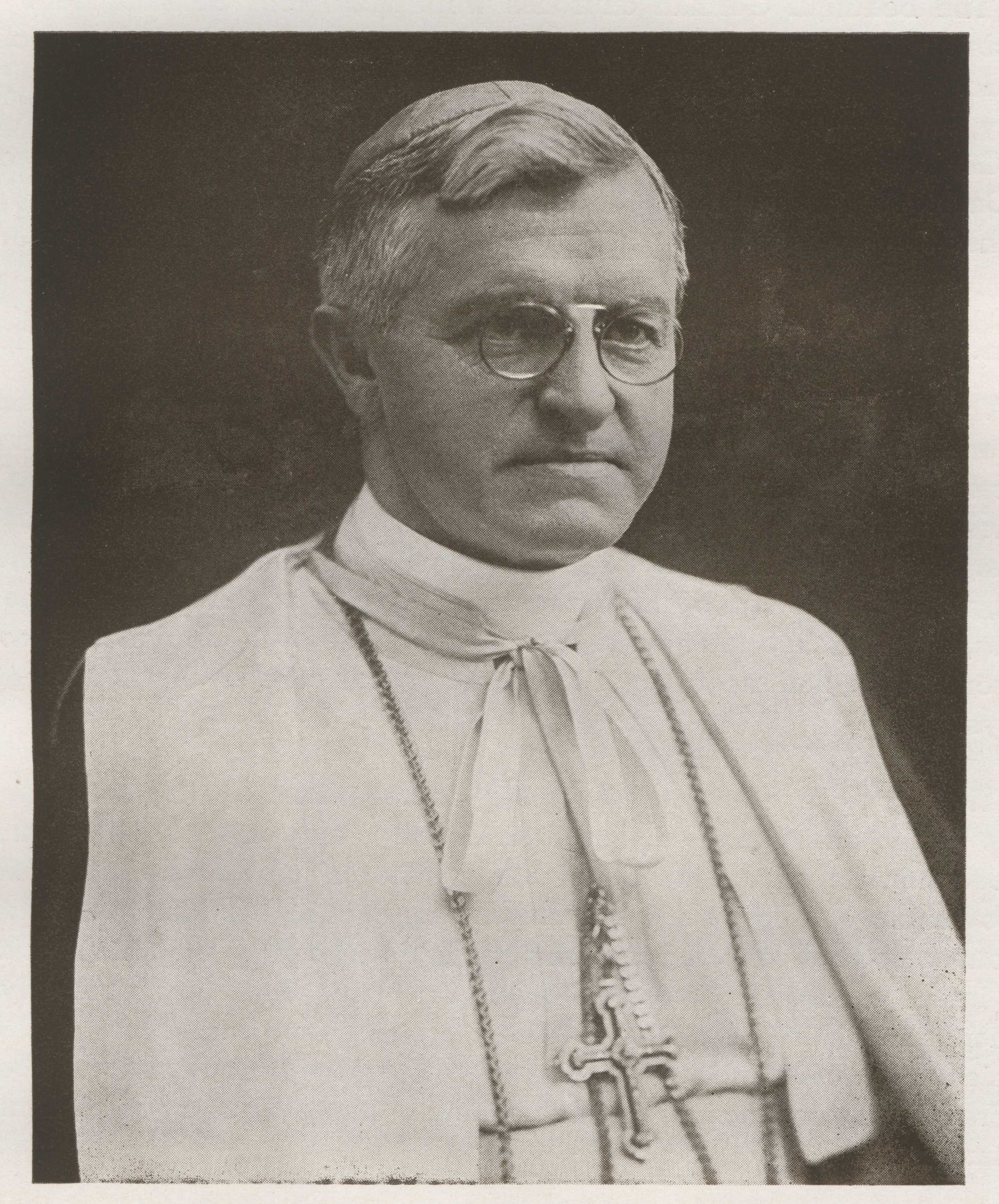
- See: Archdiocese of Cincinnati
- Installed: August 12, 1925
- Term ended: April 22, 1950
- Predecessor: Henry K. Moeller
- Successor: Karl Joseph Alter
- Other post: Bishop of Duluth (1918–1925)

Orders
- Ordination: October 10, 1901
- Consecration: September 8, 1918

Personal details
- Born: December 15, 1877 Kiltimagh, County Mayo, Ireland
- Died: April 22, 1950 (aged 72) Peter G. Thomson House, Cincinnati, Ohio
- Buried: Gate of Heaven Catholic Cemetery, Montgomery, Ohio, U.S.
- Denomination: Roman Catholic Church
- Coat of arms

John Timothy McNicholas, O.P. (December 15, 1877 – April 22, 1950) was an Irish-born American Catholic prelate who served as Archbishop of Cincinnati from 1925 to 1950. He previously served as Bishop of Duluth from 1918 to 1925. McNicholas was a member of the Dominican Order.

== Biography ==
=== Early life and education ===
Timothy McNicholas was born in Kiltimagh, County Mayo, the youngest of eight children of Patrick J. and Mary (née Mullany) McNicholas. In 1881, he and his family emigrated to the United States, where they settled in Chester, Pennsylvania. He received his early education at Immaculate Heart of Mary School in Chester, and then attended St. Joseph's Preparatory College in Philadelphia.

In 1894, at age 17, McNicholas entered the Order of Friars Preachers (more commonly known as the Dominicans) at St. Rose Priory in Springfield, Kentucky. He continued his studies at St. Joseph Priory in Somerset, Ohio.

=== Priesthood ===
McNicholas was ordained to the priesthood at St. Joseph Priory by Bishop Henry K. Moeller on October 10, 1901. Following his ordination, the Dominicans sent McNicholas to Rome to study at their studium at the Basilica Santa Maria sopra Minerva. He obtained a Doctor of Sacred Theology degree from there in 1904.

McNicholas returned to Ohio later in 1904 and was appointed master of novices at St. Joseph Priory. The following year, the Dominicans sent him to Immaculate Conception College in Washington, D.C., where he served as regent of studies and professor of philosophy, theology, and canon law. He contributed a number of articles to the Catholic Encyclopedia.

In 1909, McNicholas was appointed the national director of the Holy Name Society, headquartered in New York City. He also served as the first editor of the Holy Name Journal and as pastor of St. Catherine of Siena Parish in Manhattan He returned to Rome in 1917 to become an assistant to the master of the Order of Preachers and a professor of theology and canon law at the Pontifical University of St. Thomas Aquinas.

=== Bishop of Duluth ===
On July 18, 1918, McNicholas was appointed the second bishop of Duluth by Pope Benedict XV. He received his episcopal consecration in Rome at the Santa Maria sopra Minerva on September 8, 1918, from Cardinal Tommaso Pio Boggiani, with Archbishop Bonaventura Cerretti and Bishop Hermann Esser serving as co-consecrators. His installation took place in Duluth on November 15, 1918. The Vatican raised McNicholas to the rank of an assistant at the pontifical throne in 1923.

=== Archbishop of Cincinnati ===
In May 1925, Pope Pius XI named McNicholas as bishop of the Archdiocese of Indianapolis. He was succeeding Bishop Joseph Chartrand, whom the pope appointed as archbishop of Cincinnati. However, Chartrand rejected his appointment. Instead, Pius XI appointed McNicholas as the fourth archbishop of Cincinnati on July 8, 1925. His installation took place at St. Peter in Chains Cathedral in Cincinnati on August 12, 1925.

The 1928 U.S. presidential election featured New York Governor Al Smith as the first Catholic presidential candidate in American history. Some people raised concerns that, as president, Smith would take orders from church leaders in Rome. McNicholas declared. "We, as American Catholics, owe no civil allegiance to the Vatican State." Smith lost the election to US Secretary of Commerce Herbert Hoover.

After the conversion of 70 African-Americans in the archdiocese to Catholicism, McNicholas said,

"I earnestly ask all our colored citizens to consider the position of the Catholic Church, to study her teachings, to realize that her ceremonials, her processions, her music, are full of a profound meaning which, if understood, could not fail to stir the deepest emotion of the colored race."

During his tenure as archbishop, McNicholas raised the level of Catholic education at all levels throughout the archdiocese and the country. He served as president-general of the National Catholic Education Association (1946–1950) and national chairman of the Catholic Student Mission Crusade. He held a 13-year membership on the Episcopal Committee for Confraternity of Christian Doctrine. McNicholas also served on the board of Catholic University of America. Between 1945 and 1950, he held five terms as chair of the Administration Board of the National Catholic Welfare Conference (NCWC). In 1948, Pope Pius XII wrote to McNicholas, as NCWC chair, urging the United States Government to accept European displaced persons as immigrants. The letter, later quoted in the 1952 Vatican document Exsul Familia on the rights of refugees, declares that such refugees sometimes have a right in natural law to be admitted to rich countries:

"The sovereignty of the State, although it must be respected, cannot be exaggerated to the point that access to this land is, for inadequate or unjustified reasons, denied to needy and decent people from other nations, provided of course, that the public wealth, considered very carefully, does not forbid this."

=== Death and legacy ===
On April 22, 1950, at age 72, John McNicholas died from a heart attack at his residence in the College Hill neighborhood of Cincinnati.Archbishop McNicholas High School in Cincinnati was named in his honor.

== Viewpoints ==
=== Denunciation of Nazism ===
In 1938, McNicholas condemned the persecution of Jews in Nazi Germany and elsewhere, declaring that the German treatment of Jews "deserves the condemnation of all right-thinking men" and was "irrational and inhuman." He also denounced the policies of the "madman Hitler" and said that there was "little essential difference between his brand of fascism and the Bolshevism of Stalin." That same year, McNicholas issued a pastoral letter in which he wrote,

"Governments that have no fixed standards of morality, and consequently no moral sense, can scarcely settle the question of war on moral grounds for Christians ... who see and know the injustice of practically all wars in our modern pagan world. There is the very practical question for informed Christians who acknowledge the supreme dominion of God ... Will such Christians in our country form a mighty league of conscientious non-combatants?"

=== Ecumenism ===
In 1931, McNicholas joined clergymen of various faiths in participating "The Church in the Air", a CBS radio program. However, he strongly prohibited Catholics from his archdiocese from participating in non-Catholic religious ceremonies, saying,

"The Catholic Church cannot give the impression that one religion is as good as another or that she must strive with those of other faiths for a common denominator in religion."

=== Media morality ===
In response to Archbishop Amleto Giovanni Cicognani's call for a movement to counteract the influence of "salacious cinema", McNicholas in 1933 founded the Catholic Legion of Decency (later renamed the National Legion of Decency) . The organization, which claimed at its high point a membership of 22,000,000, sought to influence decency standards in filmmaking and boycott films that it deemed offensive to Catholic teaching.

=== Social justice ===
During the Great Depression of the 1930s, McNicholas advocated "conscription of excess wealth" as "wholly in harmony with the principles of Christian social justice" and named extreme concentration of wealth as one of the "crimes of the country". He also said the state could not place on charity the full burden of caring for the unemployed.

Catholic Church titles
| Preceded by James McGolrick | Bishop of Duluth; 1918–1925 | Succeeded by Thomas Anthony Welch |
| Preceded by Henry K. Moeller | Archbishop of Cincinnati; 1925–1950 | Succeeded by Karl Joseph Alter |
