= Catholic Telecommunications Network of America =

American television network

Catholic Telecommunications Network of America (CTNA) was an American Catholic television network that existed from 1982 to 1994. It was sponsored by the National Conference of Catholic Bishops, which spent $30 million on the network. The network's failure has been explained by its being "unable to adapt quickly to its environment". It has been called "a mistake the church doesn't want to repeat". Its competitor, EWTN, which also started up in the early 1980s, went on to become reportedly "the world's largest religious media network". While EWTN distributed its programming directly to cable headends in similar fashion to the Christian Broadcasting Network and all other evangelical networks of the time, CTNA was designed differently, which challenged its growth and success. It was organized to distribute religious programming and communication services to each network-affiliated diocese in the US. In doing so, it recognized the role and authority of the local Ordinary (bishop), identifying him as the gatekeeper of that programming. The bishop then decided and approved which programs would be placed on local cable and broadcast TV stations throughout the diocese based on the religious needs of the faithful. In addition to distributing religious programming, both "live" and recorded, the network also incorporated email and audio programming via the satellite's subcarriers.
