= Roman Catholic Diocese of Duluth =

Latin Catholic jurisdiction in US

Coordinates: 46°47′13″N 92°05′53″W

Diocese of Duluth Dioecesis Duluthensis
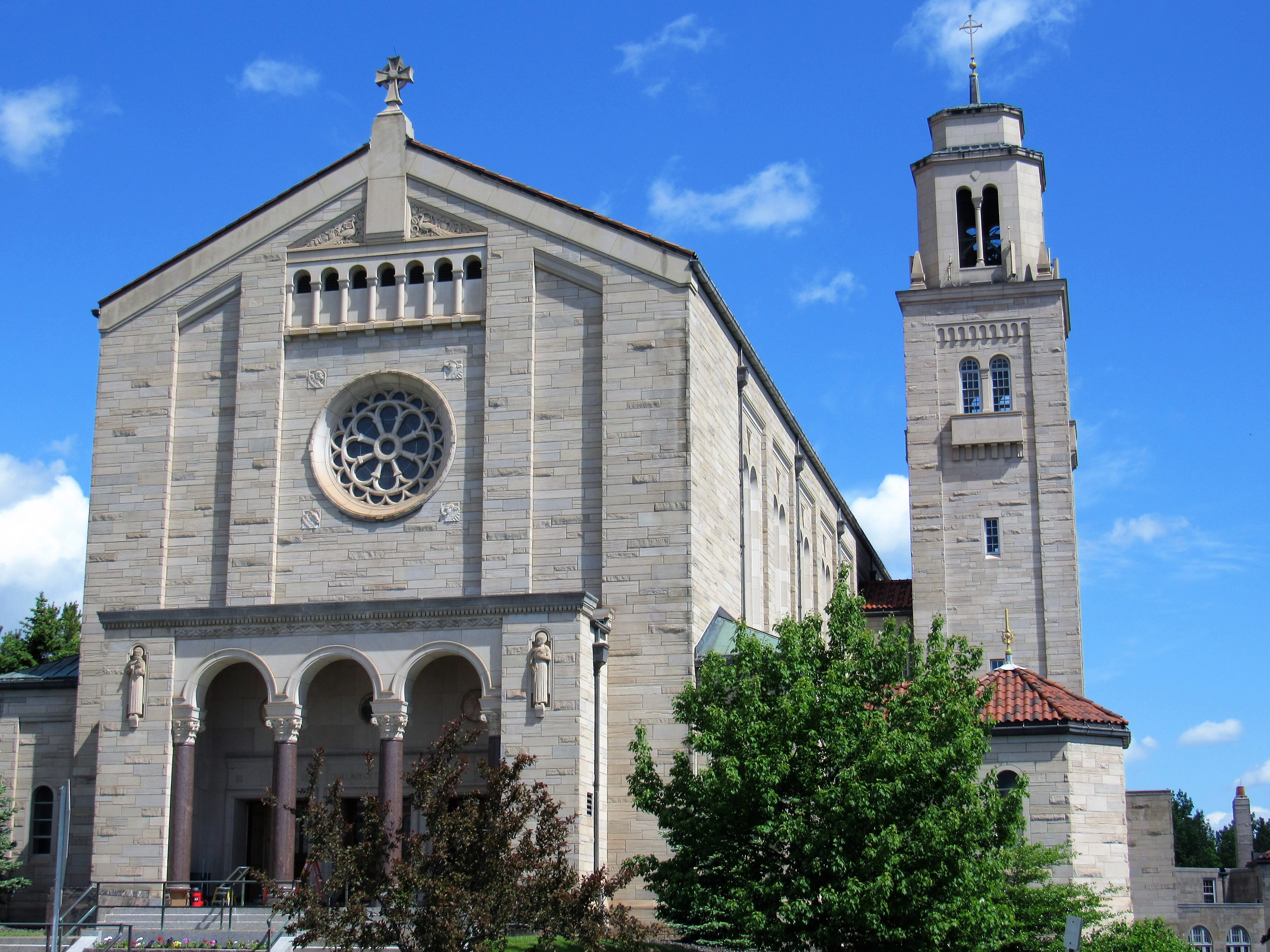
- Cathedral of Our Lady of the Rosary

- Coat of arms

Location
- Country: United States
- Territory: 10 counties in northeastern Minnesota
- Ecclesiastical province: Saint Paul and Minneapolis

Statistics
- Area: 22,354 sq mi (57,900 km^{2})
- Population: Total; Catholics: (as of 2016); 447,568; 53,046 (11.9%)
- Parishes: 74

Information
- Denomination: Catholic
- Sui iuris church: Latin Church
- Rite: Roman Rite
- Established: October 3, 1889 (137 years ago)
- Cathedral: Cathedral of Our Lady of the Rosary
- Patron saint: Our Lady of the Holy Rosary
- Secular priests: 71 (diocesan); 3 (Religious Orders); 57 Permanent Deacons

Current leadership
- Pope: Leo XIV
- Bishop: Daniel John Felton
- Metropolitan Archbishop: Bernard Hebda

Map

Website
- dioceseduluth.org

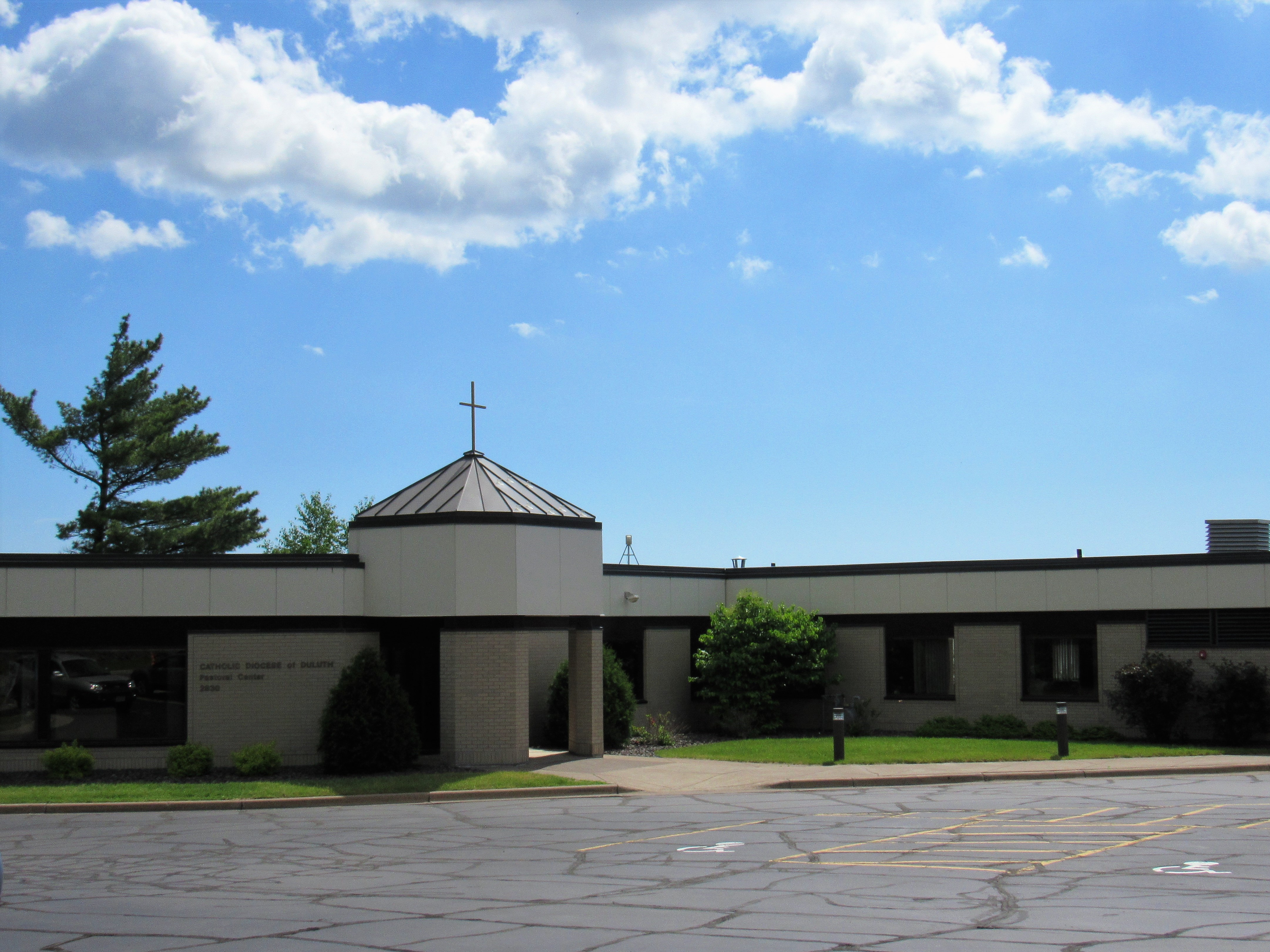
Diocesan Pastoral Center (2017)

The Diocese of Duluth (Latin: Dioecesis Duluthensis) is a diocese of the Catholic Church in northeastern Minnesota in the United States. The mother church is the Cathedral of Our Lady of the Rosary in Duluth.

== Territory ==
The Diocese of Duluth includes Aitkin, Carlton, Cass, Cook, Crow Wing, Itasca, Koochiching, Lake, Pine and St. Louis Counties. As of 2023, the diocese had a Catholic population of approximately 41,000 in 70 parishes.

== History ==
During the 17th and 18th centuries, French Catholic missionaries passed through the Duluth area accompanying voyageurs on their explorations of the Upper Great Lakes. Frederick Baraga established missions during the 1830s at Grand Portage and Fond du Lac.

The northeastern Minnesota area went through several Catholic jurisdictions before the Vatican erected the Diocese of Crookston:

- Diocese of Saint Louis (1826 to 1837)
- Diocese of Dubuque (1837 to 1850)
- Diocese of Saint Paul (1850 to 1875)
- Vicariate Apostolic of Northern Minnesota (1875 to 1889)

=== 1889 to 1925 ===
The Diocese of Duluth was erected on October 3, 1889, by Pope Leo XIII. Its territory was taken from the Vicariate Apostolic of Northern Minnesota. The pope appointed James McGolrick of the Diocese of Saint Paul as the first bishop of Duluth.

At the time of McGolrick's arrival in Duluth in January 1890, the new diocese contained 22 priests, 32 churches, ten stations, five parochial schools, and a Catholic population over 20,000. After a fire destroyed the cathedral in 1892, McGolrick laid the cornerstone for the new Sacred Heart Cathedral in 1894 and dedicated it two years later. He founded St. Mary's Hospital in Duluth in 1898 and St. James Orphanage in 1910.

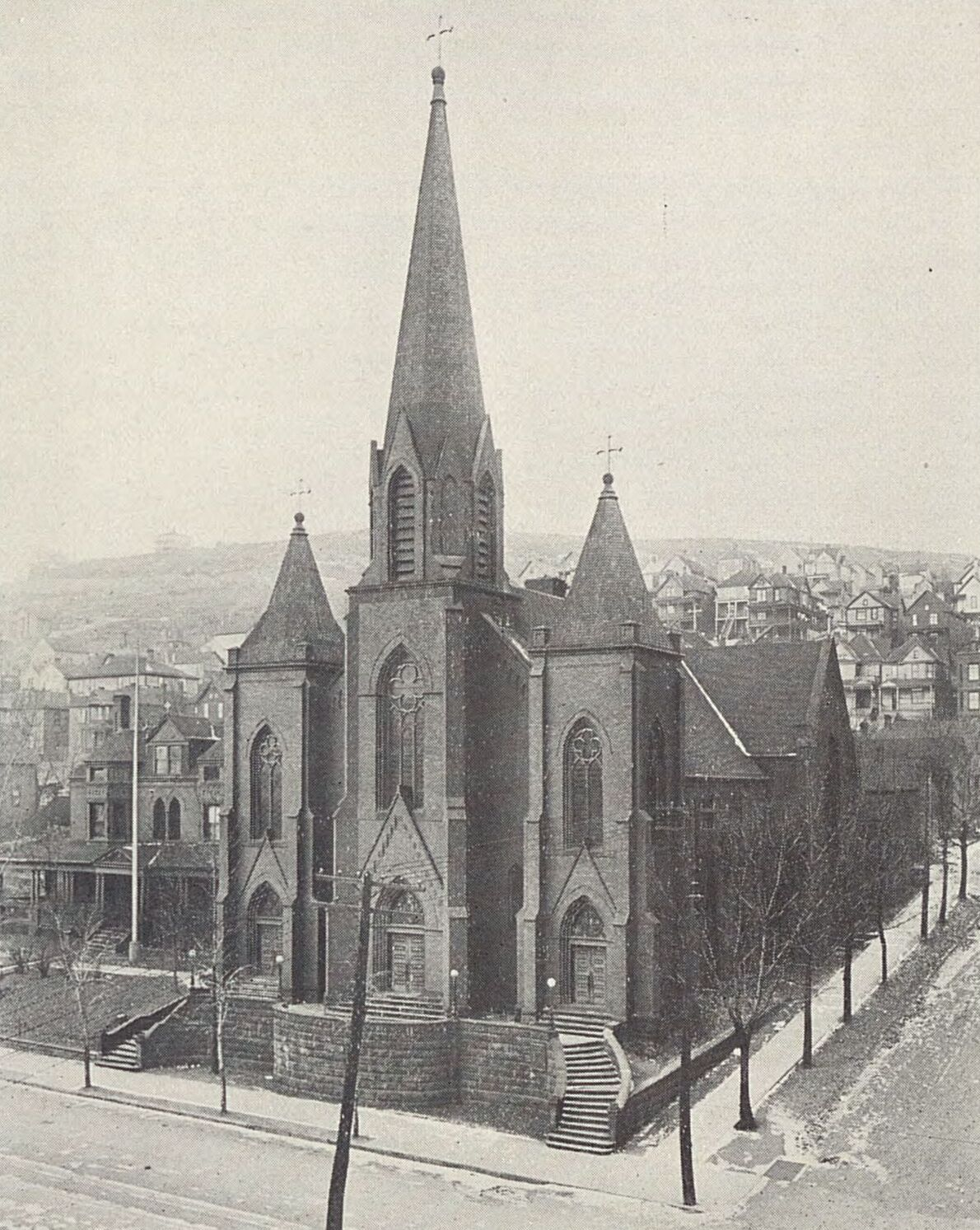
Sacred Heart Cathedral, Duluth, Minnesota

By the time of McGolrick's death in 1918, the diocese had 59 priests, 42 churches with resident pastors, 46 missions with churches, 35 stations, 11 parochial schools, and a Catholic population of almost 60,000. To replace McGolrick, Pope Benedict XV named John T. McNicholas. After several years in Duluth, McNicholas became archbishop of the Archdiocese of Cincinnati in 1925.

=== 1925 to 1982 ===
The third bishop of Duluth was Monsignor Thomas Welch of Saint Paul, named in 1925 by Pope Pius XI. During his 33-year tenure, Welch resolved the financial crisis in the diocese and also constructed the Cathedral of Our Lady of the Rosary. Welch died in 1959.

Following Welch's death, Bishop Francis Schenk of the Diocese of Crookston was appointed bishop of Duluth by Pope John XXIII in 1960. In 1968, Paul Anderson of the Archdiocese of Boston was appointed coadjutor bishop in Duluth to assist Schenk by Pope Paul VI. When Schenk retired the next year, Anderson automatically succeeded him as bishop of Duluth.

During his 13-year tenure, Anderson earned a reputation as an advocate for progressive causes, and worked to implement the reforms of the Second Vatican Council. He organized five regional pastoral councils, encouraged charismatic services, and improved Catholic relations with Protestants and Jews. He privately believed in the ordination of women, and appointed one of the first laywomen to serve on a diocesan matrimonial court. Anderson was appointed as an auxiliary bishop of the Diocese of Sioux Falls in 1982.

=== 1982 to present ===
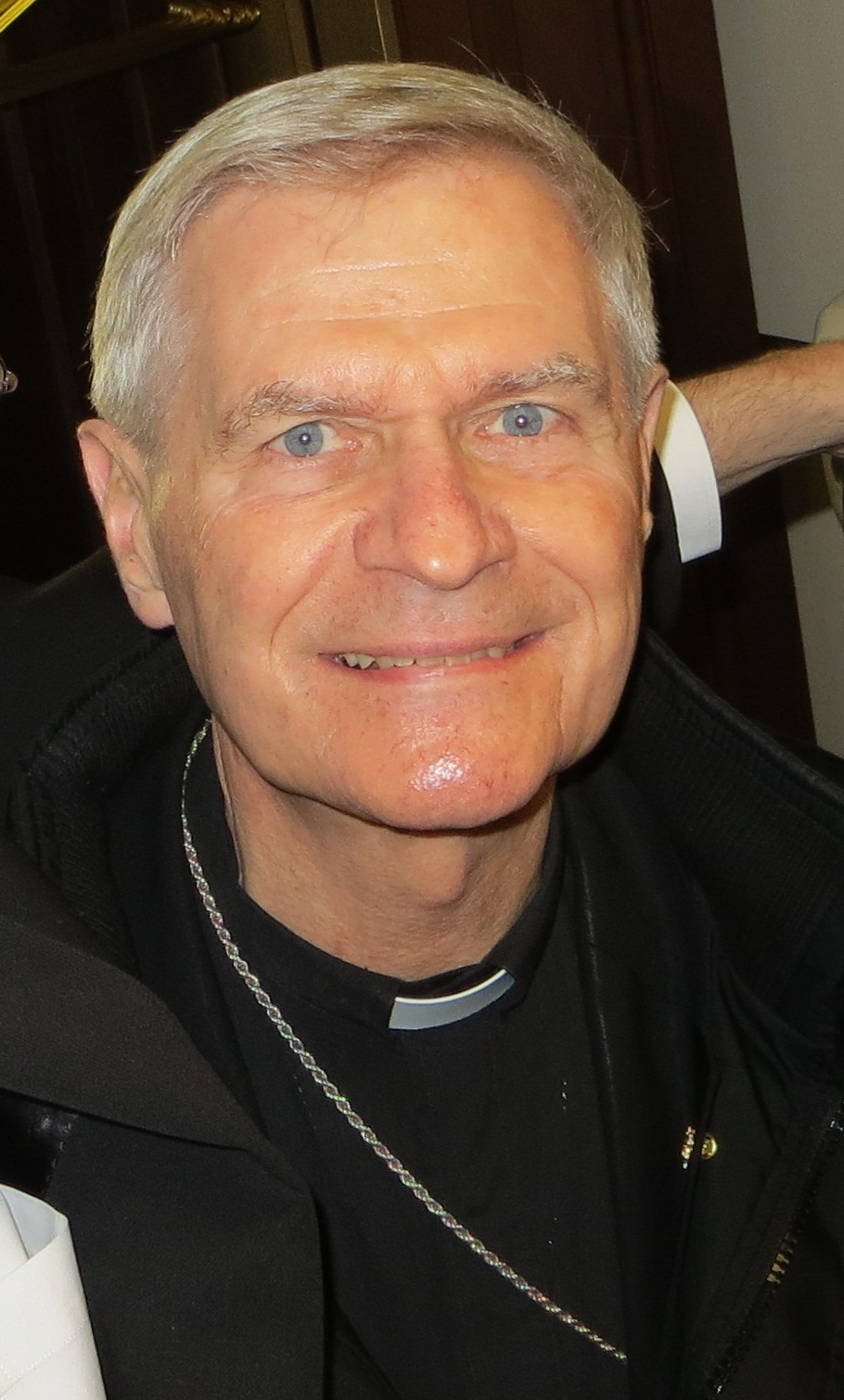
Archbishop Schweitz (2013)

Robert Brom was the next bishop of Duluth, beginning in 1983. The pope moved Brom in 1989 to the Diocese of San Diego to serve there as coadjutor bishop. Roger Schwietz replaced him. In 2000, Schwietz became coadjutor archbishop for the Archdiocese of Anchorage.

Dennis Schnurr was the next bishop of Duluth, named in 2001. Seven years later, he became coadjutor archbishop of the Archdiocese of Cincinnati. Schnurr was followed in Duluth by Paul Sirba in 2009. The diocese filed for Chapter 11 bankruptcy protection in 2015 to allow for a settlement of sexual abuse lawsuits. Sirba died in 2019.

In June 2020, Michel Mulloy became the next bishop of Duluth. However, before his consecration in October, the Diocese of Rapid City removed Mulloy from ministry, having receiving an allegation of sexual abuse of a minor in the 1980s. Mulloy resigned his appointment as bishop in September 2020. In March 2023, the Vatican determined that it could not prove the allegation against Mulloy; however, he was not returned to public ministry.

The current bishop of Duluth, as of 2021, is Daniel Felton.

=== Sex abuse ===
In 2013, the diocese released a list of 17 priests with credible accusations of sexual abuse. More names were added to the list in 2022.

In November 2015, a jury awarded $8 million in damages against the diocese and a religious order. The plaintiff had alleged being sexually abused as a 15 year old altar boy by James Fitzgerald, a diocesan priest, in 1978. In December 2015, the diocese filed for Chapter 11 bankruptcy protection. It took this action after facing the Fitzgerald verdict, six other lawsuits and 12 additional claims stemming from child sexual abuse cases.

The diocese in 2017 released a statement about Louis Brouillard, a priest from the Archdiocese of Agana in Guam. In the 1970s, the archdiocese received accusations of sexual abuse of minors against Brouillard. Despite the accusations in Guam, the diocese in 1981 had allowed Brouillard to move to Pine City and assist at the local parish. By 1984, diocese officials had become suspicious that Brouillard was sexually abusing a boy from Guam who was sharing his residence and revoked Brouillard's appointment. Brouillard in 2017 admitted to abusing 20 boys.

In May 2019, the Diocese of Duluth agreed to pay $40 million to 125 plaintiffs who were the alleged victims of sexual abuse by 37 diocesan priests.

== Bishops ==
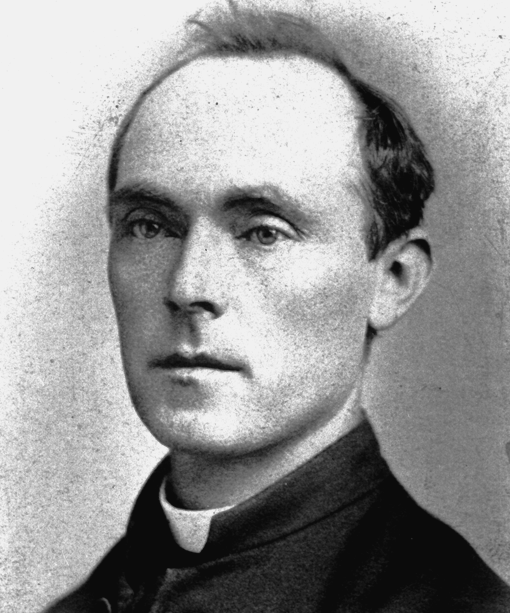
Bishop McGolrick (1868)

=== Bishops of Duluth ===
1. James McGolrick (1889–1918)
2. John Timothy McNicholas, O.P. (1918–1925), appointed Archbishop of Cincinnati
3. Thomas Anthony Welch (1925–1959)
4. Francis Joseph Schenk (1960–1969)
5. Paul Francis Anderson (1969–1982), appointed Auxiliary Bishop of Sioux Falls
6. Robert Henry Brom (1983–1989), appointed Coadjutor Bishop and later Bishop of San Diego
7. Roger Lawrence Schwietz, O.M.I. (1989–2000), appointed Coadjutor Archbishop and later Archbishop of Anchorage
8. Dennis Marion Schnurr (2001–2008), appointed Coadjutor Archbishop and later Archbishop of Cincinnati
9. Paul Sirba (2009–2019)
10. Daniel John Felton (2021–present)

=== Coadjutor bishop ===
Paul Francis Anderson (1968–1969)

=== Auxiliary bishop ===
Lawrence Alexander Glenn (1956–1960), appointed Bishop of Crookston

=== Other diocesan priest who became bishop ===
Peter Michael Muhich, appointed Bishop of Rapid City in 2020

== Education ==
As of 2025, the Diocese of Duluth had nine elementary schools and one high school, Stella Maris Junior/Senior High School.
