= Sacred Heart Cathedral, Sacred Heart School and Christian Brothers Home =

Historic church in Minnesota, United States

- U.S. National Register of Historic Places
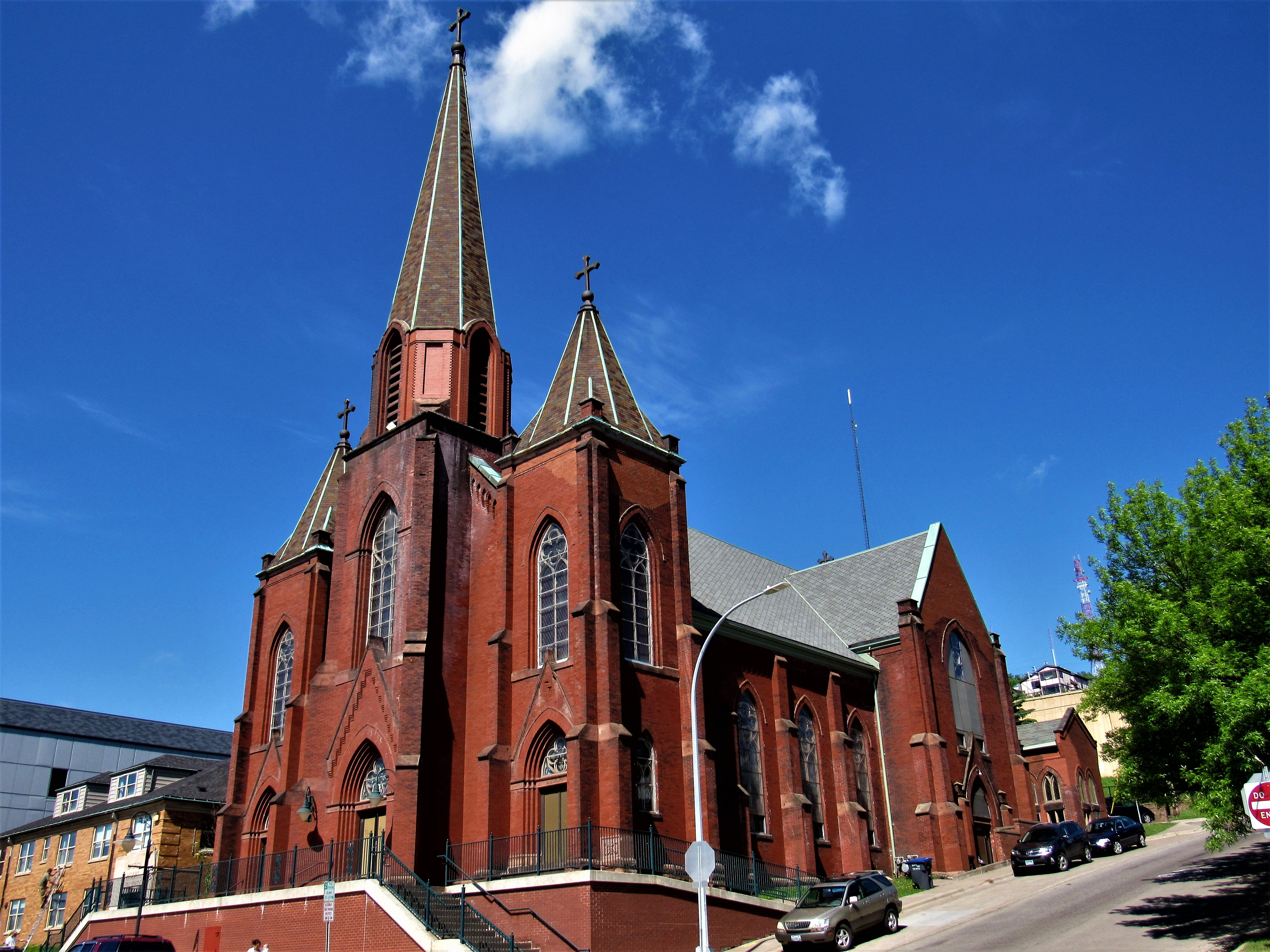
- Sacred Heart Cathedral viewed from the east

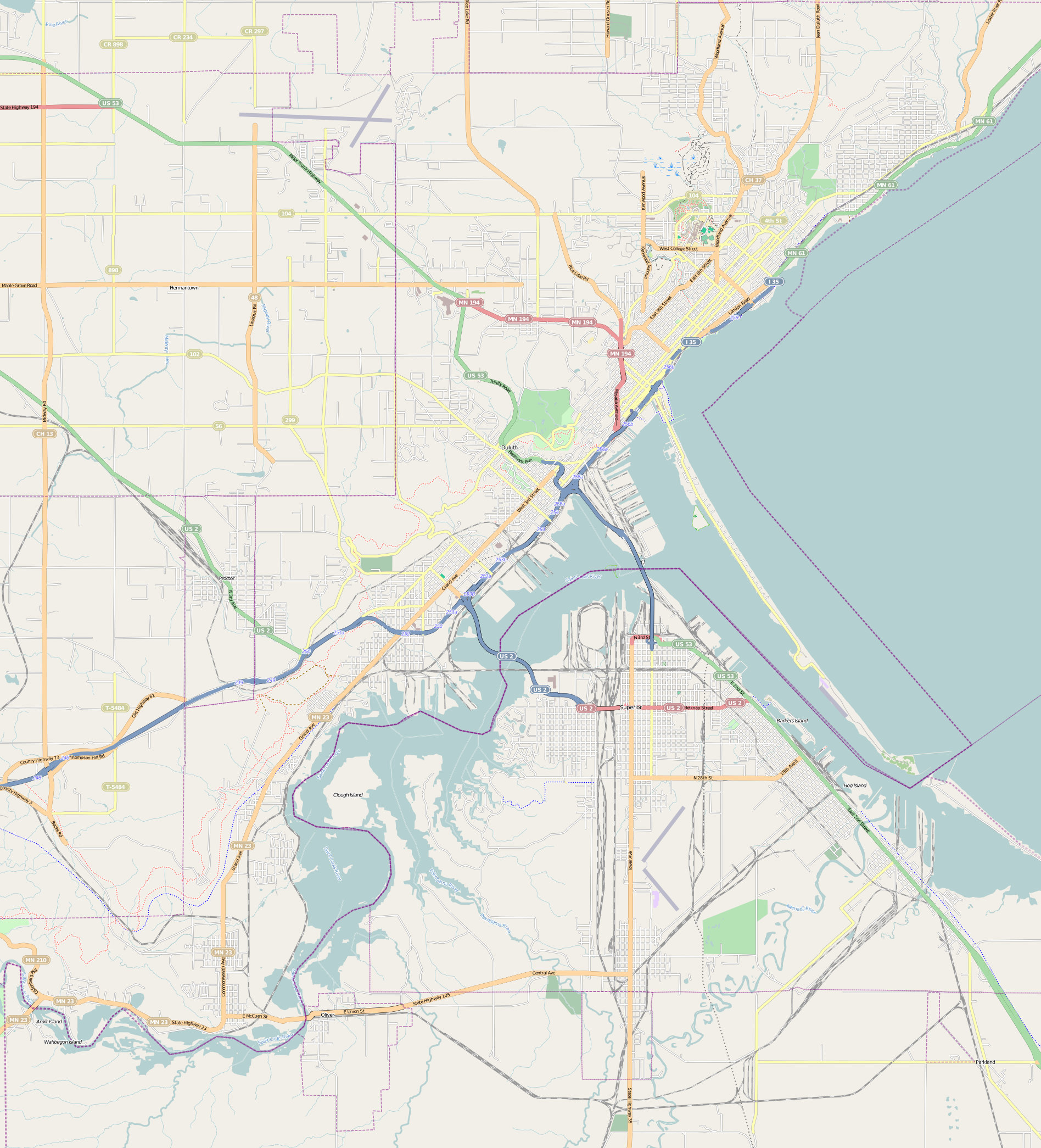
- Location within Duluth Location within Minnesota Location within the United States
- Location: 206 and 211 W. 4th Street, 315 N. 2nd Avenue W., Duluth, Minnesota
- Coordinates: 46°47′15″N 92°6′19″W
- Area: 2 acres (0.81 ha)
- Built: 1894–96 (cathedral), 1904 (school), 1907 (home)
- Architect: Gearhard A. Tenbusch (cathedral), William T. Bray & I. Vernon Hill (school), Bray & Carl E. Nystrom (home)
- Architectural style: Late Gothic Revival (cathedral), American Craftsman/Gothic (school & home)
- NRHP reference No.: 86001382 (original), 05000446 (increase)

Significant dates
- Added to NRHP: June 26, 1986
- Boundary increase: May 19, 2005

Sacred Heart Cathedral, Sacred Heart School and Christian Brothers Home comprise a former Roman Catholic diocesan complex in the Central Hillside neighborhood of Duluth, Minnesota, United States. Sacred Heart Cathedral was built from 1894 to 1896 and served as the seat of the Roman Catholic Diocese of Duluth until 1957, after which it became a parish church. Sacred Heart School was built in 1904 and the Christian Brothers Home—a monastic residence for the school faculty—was built in 1907.

In 1985 the diocese merged the parish into another and sold off the Sacred Heart buildings. The cathedral is now the Sacred Heart Music Center, a performance and event venue. The school has been repurposed as the Damiano Center, an ecumenical provider of social services. The monastery is now Alicia's Place, which offers Section 8 housing for homeless women.

The cathedral and school were listed on the National Register of Historic Places in 1986. In 2005 the listing was expanded to include the Christian Brothers Home. The complex was listed for its state-level significance in the themes of architecture and religion. It was nominated for its exemplary Late Gothic Revival cathedral designed by local architect Gearhard A. Tenbusch and for representing the historical seat of authority of the Diocese of Duluth and its educational efforts.

== History ==
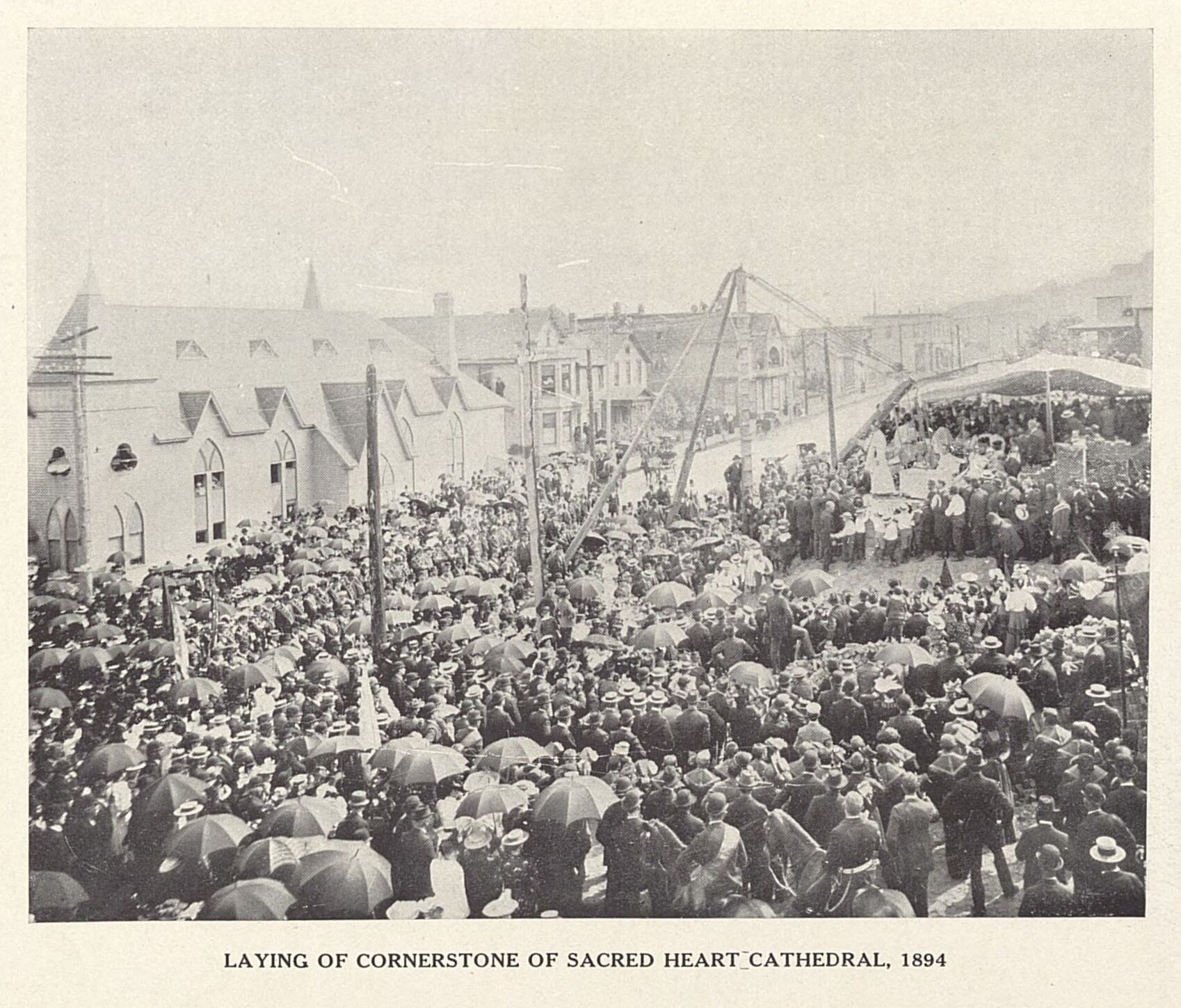
Laying of cornerstone of Sacred Heart Cathedral, 1894, from History of the Diocese of Duluth, Duluth, Minnesota.

The buildings belonged to the first Roman Catholic parish in Duluth, founded by Rev. John Chebul in 1870. The parish originally occupied a small wooden building, but it burned down in 1892. A new building was started in 1894 and completed in 1896. A 1,493-pipe pipe organ (Opus 664) was installed in 1898, built by Felgemaker Organ Company, of Erie, Pennsylvania. The organ has been listed by the Organ Historical Society for its "exceptional historic merit, worthy of preservation."

In 1985 the Diocese of Duluth announced that the congregation would be merging with the congregation of nearby St. Mary, Star of the Sea, and that the building would be closed. Joan M. (White) Connolly, who had started playing the Sacred Heart organ in 1930 when she was a sophomore in high school, wanted to preserve the building and keep the organ in its original space. She recruited volunteers, and bought the church from the diocese for $1. The church building now serves as a performance space for live music, and is also a venue for weddings, receptions, meetings, and other potential uses.

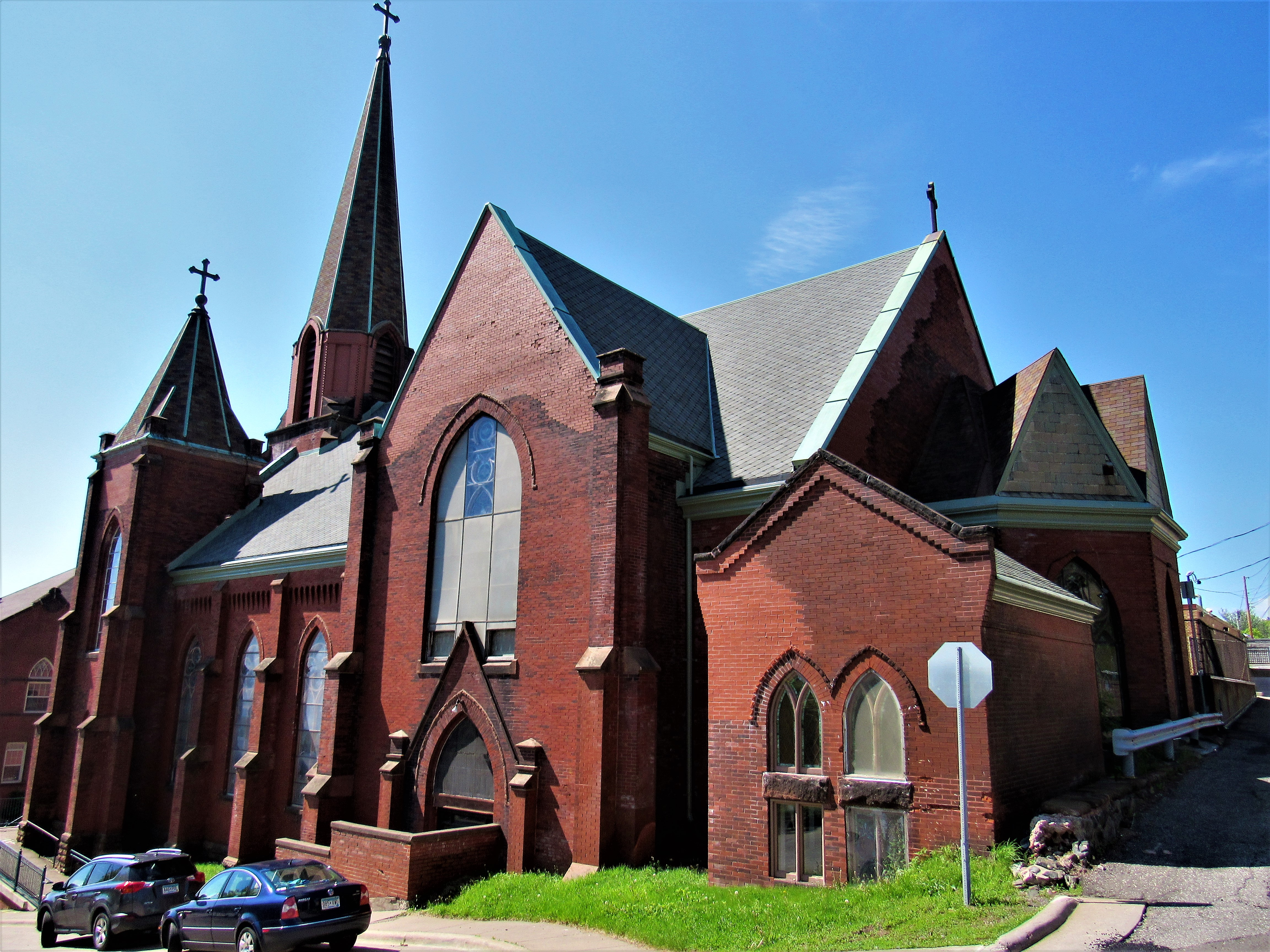
Former cathedral from the north

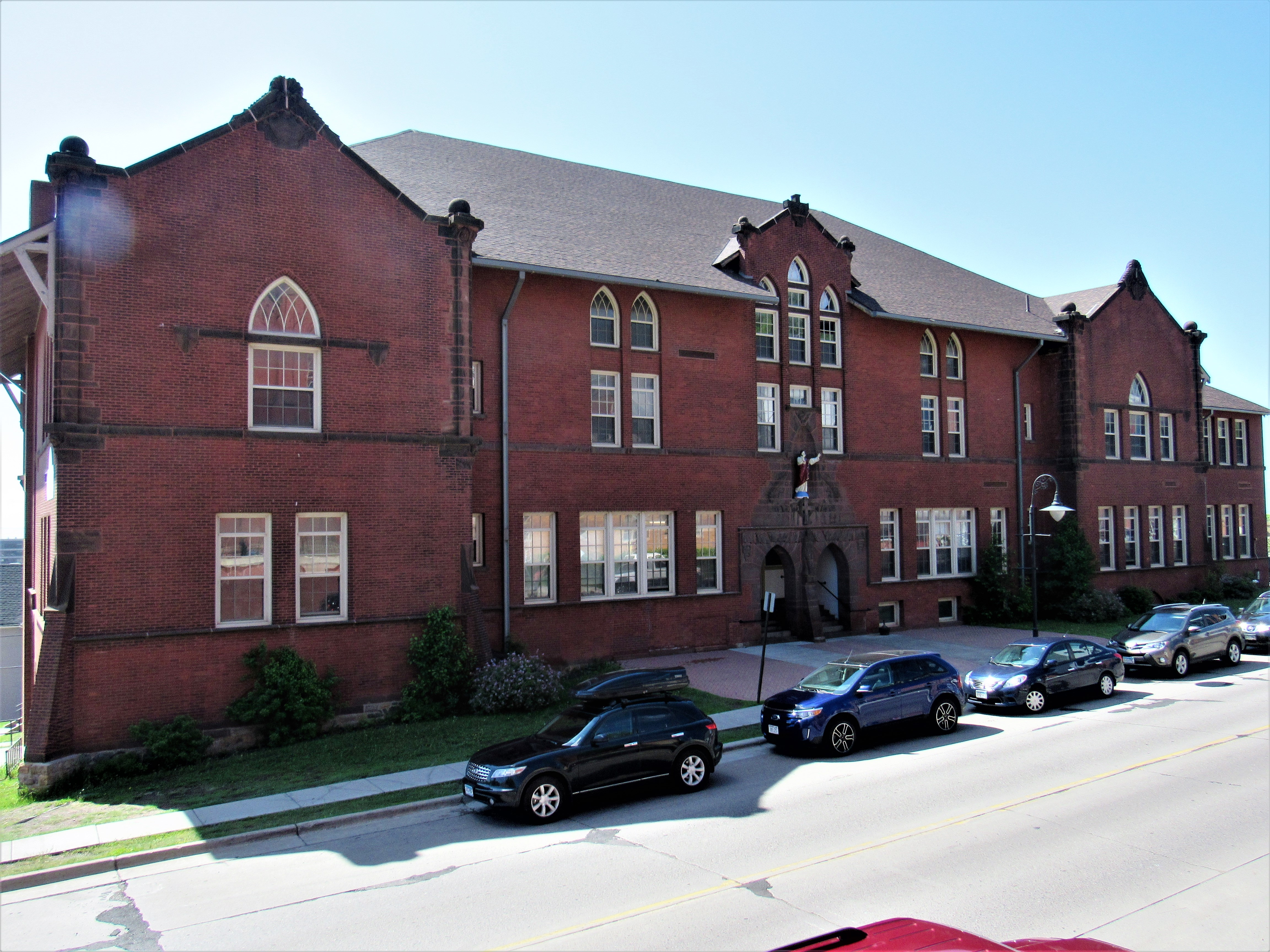
Sacred Heart School from the north

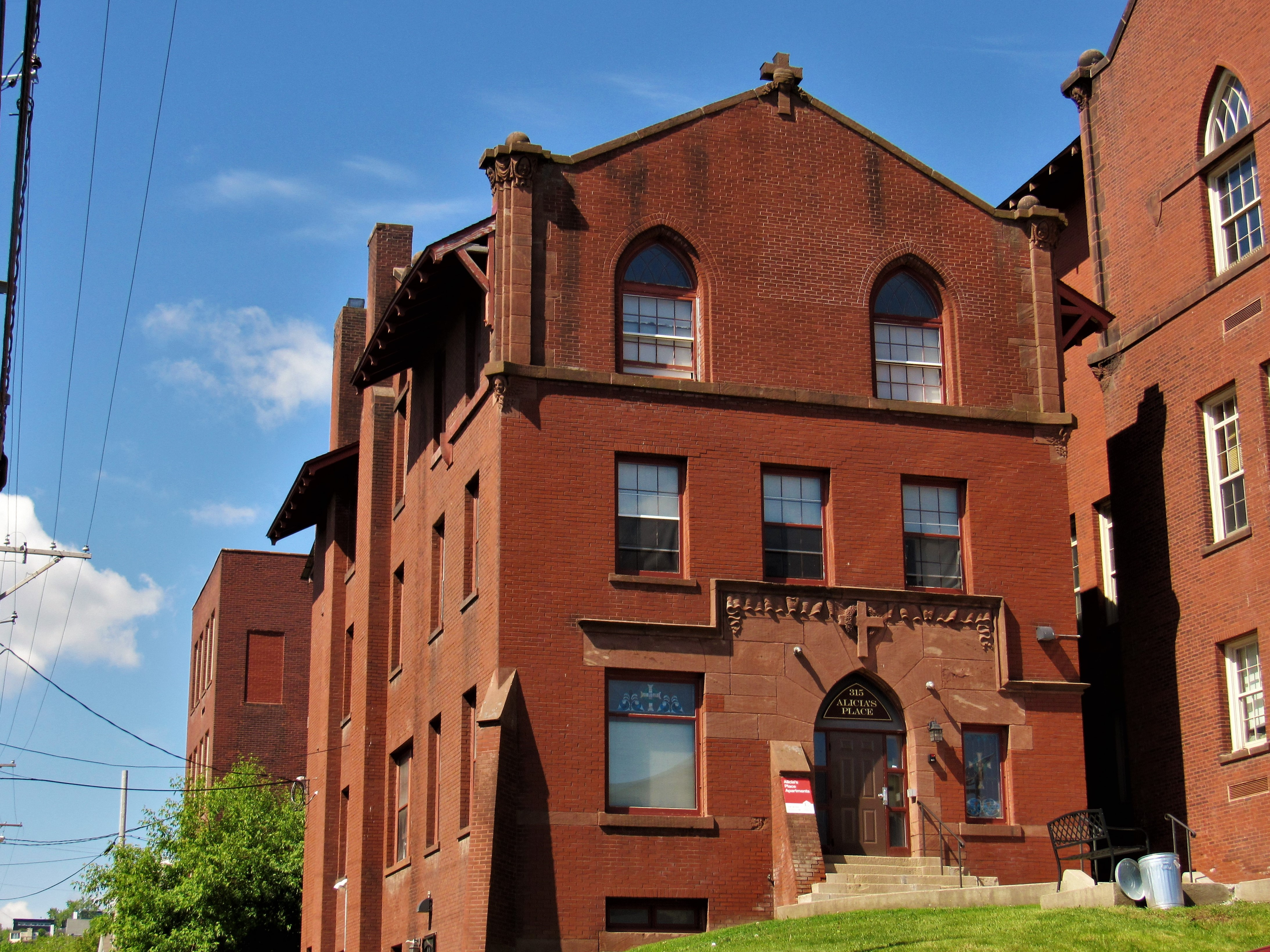
The Christian Brothers Home from the east

== See also ==
- List of Catholic cathedrals in the United States
- National Register of Historic Places listings in St. Louis County, Minnesota
